= Symphony No. 1 (Dvořák) =

1865 composition in C minor

- by Antonín Dvořák
- Key: C minor
- Catalogue: B. 9
- Composed: 1865
- Published: 1961
- Movements: 4

The Symphony No. 1 in C minor, B. 9, subtitled The Bells of Zlonice (Czech: Zlonické zvony), was composed by Antonín Dvořák during February and March 1865. It is written in the early Romantic style, inspired by the works of Ludwig van Beethoven and Felix Mendelssohn. Dvořák never heard or revised the symphony, because the completed work was lost during his lifetime. It premiered in 1936.

== History of the work ==
Dvořák submitted the score for a competition in Germany, but never saw it again, and always believed it was destroyed or irretrievably lost. He later included the work in a list of early compositions he claimed to have destroyed.

However, in 1882, an unrelated person named Dr. Rudolf Dvořák, a 22-year-old Oriental scholar, came across the score in a second-hand bookshop in Leipzig, and bought it. At that time the composer Dvořák was not widely known: although he had written six symphonies, only one of them (No. 6) had been published and only three of them (Nos. 3, 5 and 6) had been performed. Rudolf Dvořák kept the score in his possession, telling nobody about it, not even the composer. He died 38 years later, in 1920, when it passed to his son. The son brought it to the attention of the musical world in 1923. Its authenticity was proven beyond doubt, but it did not receive its first performance until 4 October 1936 in Brno, and even then, in a somewhat edited form. The orchestra was conducted by Milan Sachs, who was a Czech but was most notable for his work in opera in Zagreb, Croatia (then part of Yugoslavia). Following the work's premiere, Hans Holländer wrote a review of the work. He noted that, although the writing was at times awkward, the orchestration was not. He noted that it seemed to be similar in style to Ludwig van Beethoven and Bedřich Smetana. The symphony was not published until 1961, and was the last of Dvořák's symphonies to be either performed or published. Unlike many other early compositions, Dvořák never had a chance to revise the symphony, and so it is "particularly interesting as a very early Dvořák orchestral score in pristine condition".

== Programmatic content ==
The title The Bells of Zlonice does not appear in the score, although Dvořák is reputed to have referred to it this way in later years. While some argue that there is no programmatic content, it has been noted that several passages sound much like bells. It was originally conceived as a three-movement work, and the Allegretto was added later. The 658-measure first movement, marked Maestoso — Allegro, is, in the original version, the longest movement of all his symphonic works, owing to a 278-measure repeated exposition section comprising 44 score pages, thereby requiring just under 19 minutes to perform uncut.

== Form ==
External audio
- Performed by the Berlin Philharmonic under Rafael Kubelík
- I. Maestoso - Allegro
- II. Adagio di molto
- III. Allegretto
- IV. Finale (Allegro animato)

The work is in four movements:

1. Maestoso – Allegro (C minor), 658 measures
2. Adagio di molto (A♭ major), 204 measures
3. Allegretto (Scherzo in C minor, Trio in E♭ major), 285 measures
4. Finale (Allegro animato) (C major), 831 measures

A typical performance of the work has a duration of about fifty minutes: the movements are approximately 19, 13, 9, and 12 minutes long, respectively.

== Instrumentation ==
The work is scored for two flutes (one doubling piccolo), two oboes (one doubling English horn), two clarinets, two bassoons, four horns, two trumpets, three trombones, timpani, and strings.

== Recordings ==
The C minor symphony has been recorded various times, but the first recording complete and uncut was made in 1966 by the London Symphony Orchestra under István Kertész as part of his complete Dvořák cycle for Decca/London. Other notable recordings have been by Witold Rowicki, also with the London Symphony (Philips, 1971); the Czech Philharmonic Orchestra under Václav Neumann (Supraphon, 1987), the Berlin Philharmonic under Rafael Kubelík (DG, 1973); and the Royal Scottish National Orchestra under Neeme Järvi (Chandos, 1987).

Year	Conductor	Orchestra	Label	Catalogue Number
1966	István Kertész	London Symphony Orchestra	Decca	4786459
1971	Witold Rowicki	London Symphony Orchestra	Philips	446527
1974	Václav Neumann	Czech Philharmonic	Supraphon	1101621/8
1979	Otmar Suitner	Staatskapelle Berlin	Brilliant Classics	96043
1992	Neeme Järvi	Royal Scottish National Orchestra	Chandos	8597
1993	Stephen Gunzenhauser	Bratislava Radio Symphony Orchestra	Naxos	8550266
1995	Zdeněk Mácal	Milwaukee Symphony Orchestra	Koss	1024
1997	Rafael Kubelík	Berlin Philharmonic Orchestra	Deutsche Grammophon	423120
Around 2005	Sir Colin Davis	London Symphony Orchestra	LSO Live	432678
2012	Jiří Bělohlávek	Czech Philharmonic Orchestra	Decca	4786757
2015	Karel Mark Chichon	Deutsche Radio Philharmonie Saarbrücken Kaiserslautern	SWR Music	93330
2016	Marek Štryncl	Musica Florea	Arta	F10215
2016	Libor Pešek	Royal Liverpool Philharmonic Orchestra	Warner Classics	9029597506
2017	Marcus Bosch	Staatsphilharmonie Nürnberg	Coviello	COV91718
