= Barbora Řeháčková =

Czech jazz singer (born 1979)

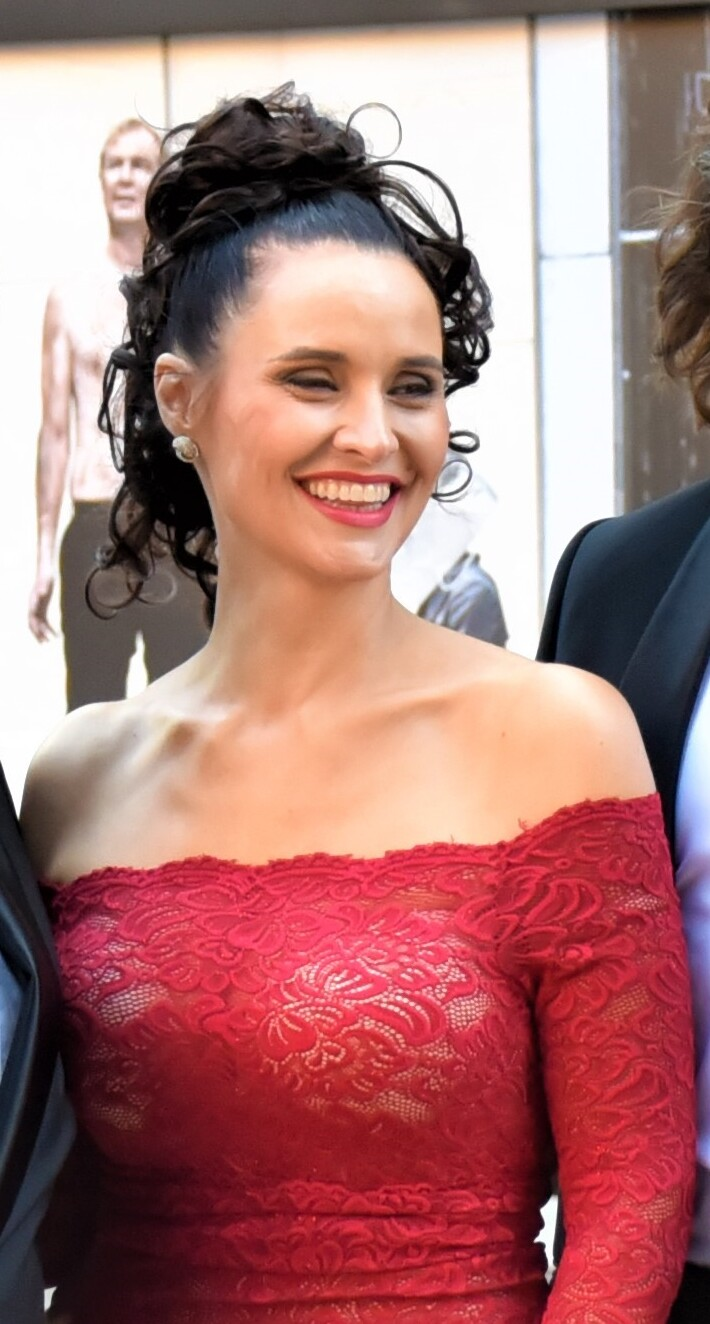
- Řeháčková in 2019

Background information
- Also known as: Barbora Mindrinu, Barbora Swinx
- Born: 1979 (age 46–47); Jičín, Czechia
- Genres: Jazz, operatic pop
- Occupation: Singer
- Years active: 1999–present
- Member of: Barbora Swinx Boys; Il Bohemo

Barbora Řeháčková (born 1979) is a Czech jazz and operatic pop singer. As of 2026, she has released two solo albums, and she performs both with her own group, Barbora Swinx Boys, as well as the vocal quartet Il Bohemo.

== Career ==
As a young girl, Barbora Řeháčková sang and danced in the Jičín folk dance group Jičíňáček, performing around Europe. In 1999, she graduated from the Teplice conservatory in violin and went on to play with the local philharmonic for three years. She subsequently developed an interest in jazz singing and toured with Czech jazz musicians, both nationally and internationally. In 2000, she toured the United Kingdom with the Czech National Symphony Orchestra, under the musical direction of Paul Freeman and Libor Pešek. From 2008 until 2011, she sang in Greece, under the stage name Barbora Mindrinu. In 2010, she released her debut album, Close to You, under her assumed name.

After returning home, she adopted the stage name Barbora Swinx. As of 2019, she performed with her own group, Barbora Swinx Boys, at venues including Prague's Reduta Jazz Club.

In 2018, Řeháčková joined the operatic pop vocal quartet Il Bohemo. Formed in 2013 by National Theatre singer Zdeněk Plech under the name Il Boemo, the group also includes Igor Loškár and Pavel Švingr.

== Discography ==
- Close to You (as Barbora Mindrinu) (2010)
- Colors of Love (as Barbora Swinx) (2015)
