= Rafael Kubelík =

Czech conductor and composer (1914–1996)

Raphael Kubelik
- Raphael Kubelik conducting (photo with dedication)
- Born: Rafael Jeroným Kubelík
- Occupation: conductor

Rafael Jeroným Kubelík, KBE (29 June 1914 – 11 August 1996) was a Czech conductor and composer.

The son of a distinguished violinist, Jan Kubelík, he was trained in Prague and made his debut with the Czech Philharmonic Orchestra at the age of 19. Having managed to maintain a career in Czechoslovakia under the Nazi occupation, he refused to work under what he considered a "second tyranny" after the Communist Czechoslovak coup d'état of 1948, and took refuge in Britain. He became a Swiss citizen in 1967.

Kubelík was music director of the Chicago Symphony Orchestra (1950–53), musical director of The Royal Opera, Covent Garden (1955–58). In 1957, he conducted and recorded the world premiere of Berlioz's Les Troyens. From 1961 to 1979, he was music director of the Bavarian Radio Symphony Orchestra, and was a frequent guest conductor for leading orchestras in Europe and America.

As a composer, Kubelík wrote in a neo-romantic idiom. His works include five operas, three symphonies, chamber music, choral works, and songs.

== Life and career ==
=== Early life ===
Kubelík was born in Býchory, Bohemia, Austria-Hungary, today's Czech Republic, the day after Archduke Ferdinand's assassination that triggered the First World War. He was the sixth child of the Bohemian violinist Jan Kubelík, whom the younger Kubelík described as "a kind of god to me". His mother was a Hungarian countess, Anna Julie Marie Széll von Bessenyö. Kubelík studied the violin with his father, and entered the Prague Conservatory at the age of 14, studying violin, piano, composition, and conducting. He graduated from the conservatory in 1933, at the age of 19; at his graduation concert he played a Paganini concerto and a composition of his own for violin and orchestra. Kubelík was also an accomplished pianist, and served as his father's accompanist on a tour of the United States in 1935.

=== Brno ===
In 1939, Kubelík became music director of the Brno Opera, a position he held until the Nazis shut the company down in November 1941. The Nazis allowed the Czech Philharmonic to continue operating; Kubelík, who had first conducted the orchestra when he was 19, became its principal conductor. In 1943 he married the Czech violinist Ludmilla Bertlová, with whom he had one son whom they named Martin Jiri Jan Josef Frantisek Radovan Andrij Paul.

In 1944, after various incidents, including one in which he declined to greet the Nazi Reichsprotektor Karl Hermann Frank with a Hitler salute, along with his refusal to conduct Wagner during the War, Kubelík "deemed it advisable to disappear from Prague and to spend a few months undercover in the countryside so as not to fall into the clutches of the SS or Gestapo". Kubelík conducted the orchestra's first post-war concert in May 1945. In 1946, he helped found the Prague Spring Festival, and conducted its opening concert on 12 May that year.

In July 1946, Kubelík began a three-month conducting tour of Australia as a guest artist for the Australian Broadcasting Commission, travelling with his wife and two-year-old son. He returned for a second tour in 1949, leading to offers to stay as chief conductor of the Melbourne Symphony Orchestra, which he refused. He would not appear in Australia again until 1958.

=== Defection ===
After the Communist coup of February 1948, Kubelík left Czechoslovakia, vowing not to return until the country was liberated. "I had lived through one form of bestial tyranny, Nazism," he told an interviewer, "As a matter of principle I was not going to live through another." He defected during a trip to Britain, where he had flown to conduct Mozart's Don Giovanni with the Glyndebourne company at the Edinburgh Festival. He had been engaged on the recommendation of Bruno Walter, whom Kubelík had assisted in this work at the 1937 Salzburg Festival. Kubelík told his wife of his decision to defect as their plane left Czechoslovakia.

In 1953, the Communist government convicted the couple in absentia of "taking illicit leave" abroad. In 1956, the regime invited him back "with promises of freedom to do anything I wanted," said Kubelík, but he refused the invitation. In a 1957 letter to The Times, Kubelík said he would seriously consider returning only when all the country's political prisoners were freed and all émigrés were given as much freedom as he would have possessed. He was invited back by the regime in 1966 but again refused; in 1968, after the Prague Spring had been ended by the Soviet invasion, he organised an international boycott, in which many of the major classical artists of the West participated.

=== Chicago, Covent Garden and Munich ===
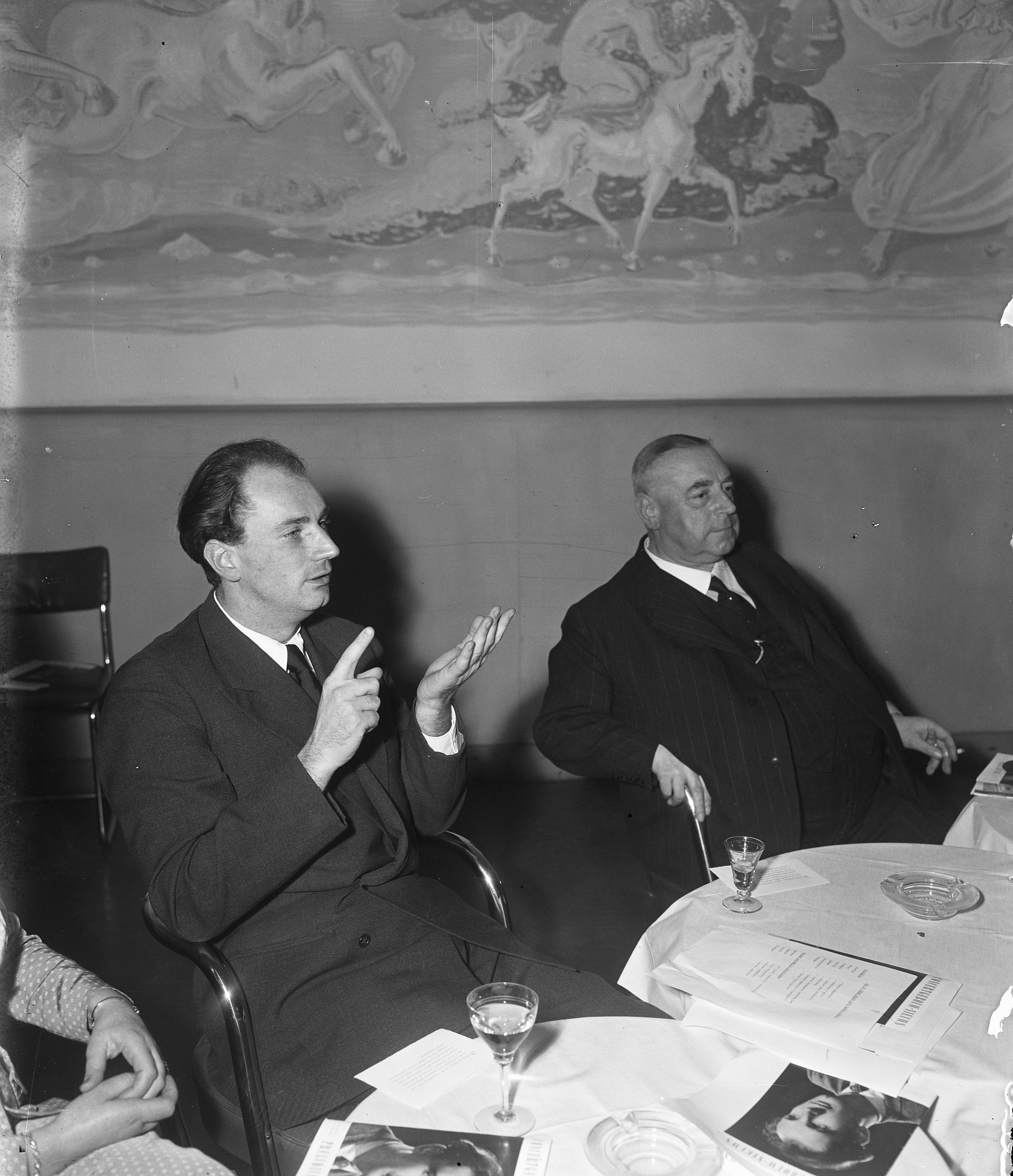
Rafael Kubelík (Amsterdam, 1950)

In 1950, Kubelík became music director of the Chicago Symphony Orchestra, choosing the position over an offer from the BBC to succeed Sir Adrian Boult as chief conductor of the BBC Symphony Orchestra. He left the post in 1953. Some hold that he was "hounded out of the [Chicago] job" (to quote Time magazine) by the "savage attacks" (to quote the New Grove Dictionary of Music and Musicians) of the Chicago Tribune music critic Claudia Cassidy. But Chicago Sun-Times music critic Robert C. Marsh argued in 1972 that it was the Chicago Symphony trustees who were behind the departure. Their foremost complaint, and that of Cassidy as well, was that Kubelík introduced too many contemporary works (about 70) to the orchestra; there were also objections to his demanding exhaustive rehearsals and discharge of principal players. Many recordings made by Kubelík in Chicago for Mercury Records are available on CD, and have received critical praise. Kubeliki's landmark recording of Pictures at an Exhibition with the CSO on Mercury led New York Times music critic Howard Taubman to observe that listening to it was like "being in the living presence of the orchestra," and Mercury began releasing their classical recordings under the "Living Presence" series name.

After leaving Chicago, Kubelík toured the US with the Concertgebouw Orchestra, and, in the words of Lionel Salter in the Grove Dictionary, "had a brilliant success with Janáček's Kát'a Kabanová at Sadler's Wells in London in 1954". Kubelík became musical director of The Royal Opera, Covent Garden, from 1955 to 1958. Among his achievements there was, in 1957, the first practically complete production in any opera house of Berlioz's Les Troyens. Although Covent Garden sought to renew his contract, he chose to leave, partly because of a campaign by Sir Thomas Beecham against the engagement of foreign artists at Covent Garden. In 1961 Kubelík accepted the position of music director of the Bavarian Radio Symphony Orchestra (BRSO) in Munich. He remained with the BRSO until 1979, when he retired. Salter considers this 18-year association the high point of Kubelík's career, both artistically and professionally.

In 1961 Ludmilla Kubelík died after a car crash. Also in 1961, he premiered the concerto performance version of Schoenberg's Jakobsleiter-Fragment in Vienna, with the Cologne Radio Symphony Orchestra and choir.

In 1963 Kubelík married the Australian soprano Elsie Morison (1924–2016), whom he had met while at Covent Garden. In 1967 he became a Swiss citizen, and began an association with the Lucerne Festival, in addition to his work with the BRSO.

In 1971, Göran Gentele, the new general manager of the Metropolitan Opera, New York, asked Kubelík to accept the position of music director. Kubelík accepted partly because of his strong artistic relationship with Gentele. The first production he conducted as the Met's music director was Les Troyens. The death of Gentele in a road accident in 1972 undermined Kubelík's reasons for working at the opera house. He had prior conducting commitments away from the Met in his first season there, which diverted his attention. He resigned from the Met in 1974, after only six months in the post.

In his post-Czechoslovak career, Kubelík worked with the Berlin Philharmonic, Boston Symphony, Chicago Symphony, Cleveland, Israel Philharmonic, London Symphony, New York Philharmonic, Vienna Philharmonic and Royal Concertgebouw orchestras, among others. His final concert was with the Czech Philharmonic.

=== Last years ===
In 1985, ill-health (notably severe arthritis in his back) caused Kubelík to retire from full-time conducting, but the fall of Communism in his native land led him to accept an invitation to return in 1990 to conduct the Czech Philharmonic at the festival he had founded, the Prague Spring Festival. He recorded Smetana's Má Vlast live with the Czech Philharmonic for Supraphon, his fifth recording of the piece. He also recorded the Mozart "Prague" Symphony and Dvořák's "New World" Symphony at the festival. During the rehearsal of the "New World," he told the Czech Philharmonic, "It is my joy to hear this. I always wanted it to sound like this but never really found it with any other orchestra in the world. That eighth [note] is great!"

On October 18, 1991, Kubelík shared the podium with Sir Georg Solti and Daniel Barenboim and the Chicago Symphony Orchestra in a performance that re-created the orchestra's inaugural October 16 and 17, 1891, concerts. Kubelík led the final work on the program: Antonín Dvořák's Husitská Overture.

Kubelík died in 1996, aged 82, in Kastanienbaum, in the Canton of Lucerne, Switzerland. His ashes are interred next to the grave of his father in Slavín, Vyšehrad cemetery in Prague.

=== Compositions ===
Among Kubelík's compositions are five operas, three symphonies, three settings of the requiem, other choral works, many pieces of chamber music, and songs. Salter describes his musical style as "neo-romantic".

== Selected recordings ==
Kubelík recorded a large repertory, in many cases more than once per work. There are two complete recordings of his traversals of three major symphony cycles – those of Brahms, Schumann, and Beethoven. When Kubelík recorded his first complete Beethoven symphony cycle for Deutsche Grammophon, he employed nine different orchestras, one for each symphony. His complete cycle of Mahler's symphonies (recorded from 1967 to 1971 with the Bavarian Radio Symphony Orchestra) is highly regarded. Of his Mahler, Daniel Barenboim remarked, "I often thought I was missing something in Mahler until I listened to Kubelík. There is a lot more to be discovered in these pieces than just a generalized form of extrovert excitement. That is what Kubelík showed." Kubelík also left much-admired recordings of operas by Verdi (his Rigoletto was recorded at La Scala with Dietrich Fischer-Dieskau), Mozart, Janáček, Dvořák and others, including Wagner, whose music he had shunned during the war, but which he conducted in later years. His recordings of Die Meistersinger and Parsifal have been ranked the top choice by many critics, including BBC Radio 3's Building a Library programme.

Kubelík's complete discography is enormous, with music ranging from Malcolm Arnold to Jan Dismas Zelenka, with recordings both in the studio and in concert. In addition to complete cycles of Beethoven, Brahms, Dvořák, and Mahler, Kubelík made recordings of orchestral and operatic works by Bach, Mozart, Haydn, Tchaikovsky, Berlioz, Wagner, Verdi and many others, including modern composers.

In May 2018, Deutsche Grammophon released a 66-disc box-set of his complete recordings for the label.

Composer	Composition	Date	Orchestra	Recording
Berlioz	Les Troyens	1957	Coven Garden Opera Chorus, Coven Garden Orchestra	Testament
Bartók	Concerto for Orchestra	1974	Boston Symphony Orchestra	Deutsche Grammophon
Beethoven	Symphony No. 4	1975	Israel Philharmonic Orchestra	Deutsche Grammophon
Beethoven	Symphony No. 5	1973	Boston Symphony Orchestra	Deutsche Grammophon
Beethoven	Symphony No. 6 "Pastorale"	1973	Orchestre de Paris	Deutsche Grammophon
Beethoven	Symphony No. 7	1974	Wiener Philharmoniker	Deutsche Grammophon
Beethoven	Symphony No. 8	1975	The Cleveland Orchestra	Deutsche Grammophon
Beethoven	Symphony No. 9 "Choral"	1975	Symphonieorchester des Bayerischen Rundfunks	Deutsche Grammophon
Berg	Violin Concerto	1971	Symphonieorchester des Bayerischen Rundfunks	Deutsche Grammophon
Brahms	A German Requiem	1978	Symphonieorchester des Bayerischen Rundfunks	Audite
Bruckner	Symphony No. 3	1954	Royal Concertgebouw Orchestra	Radio Netherlands
Bruckner	Symphony No. 3	1985	Symphonieorchester des Bayerischen Rundfunks	Sony Classical
Bruckner	Symphony No. 8	1963	Symphonieorchester des Bayerischen Rundfunks	Orfeo
Bruckner	Symphony No. 8	1977	Symphonieorchester des Bayerischen Rundfunks	BR Klassik
Bruckner	Symphony No. 9	1985	Symphonieorchester des Bayerischen Rundfunks	Orfeo
Dresden	Dansflitsen	1954	Royal Concertgebouw Orchestra	Radio Netherlands
Dvořák	Symphonic Variations	1974	Symphonieorchester des Bayerischen Rundfunks	Deutsche Grammophon
Dvořák	My Home, Overture	1973-4	Symphonieorchester des Bayerischen Rundfunks	Deutsche Grammophon
Dvořák	Hussite Dramatic overture		Symphonieorchester des Bayerischen Rundfunks	Deutsche Grammophon
Dvořák	In Nature's Realm Concert Overture		Symphonieorchester des Bayerischen Rundfunks	Deutsche Grammophon
Dvořák	Carnival Concert Overture	1977	Symphonieorchester des Bayerischen Rundfunks	Deutsche Grammophon
Dvořák	Othello Concert Overture		Symphonieorchester des Bayerischen Rundfunks	Deutsche Grammophon
Dvořák	Scherzo capriccioso	1975	Symphonieorchester des Bayerischen Rundfunks	Deutsche Grammophon
Dvořák	Symphony No. 1	1973	Berliner Philharmoniker	Deutsche Grammophon
Dvořák	Symphony No. 2	1973	Berliner Philharmoniker	Deutsche Grammophon
Dvořák	Symphony No. 3	1973	Berliner Philharmoniker	Deutsche Grammophon
Dvořák	Symphony No. 4	1973	Berliner Philharmoniker	Deutsche Grammophon
Dvořák	Symphony No. 5	1973	Berliner Philharmoniker	Deutsche Grammophon
Dvořák	Symphony No. 6	1973	Berliner Philharmoniker	Deutsche Grammophon
Dvořák	Symphony No. 7	1950	Royal Concertgebouw Orchestra	Radio Netherlands
Dvořák	Symphony No. 7	1971	Berliner Philharmoniker	Deutsche Grammophon
Dvořák	Symphony No. 8	1966	Berliner Philharmoniker	Deutsche Grammophon
Dvořák	Symphony No. 9	1973	Berliner Philharmoniker	Deutsche Grammophon
Dvořák	The Noon Witch	1974	Symphonieorchester des Bayerischen Rundfunks	Deutsche Grammophon
Dvořák	The Water Goblin	1974	Symphonieorchester des Bayerischen Rundfunks	Deutsche Grammophon
Dvořák	The Wild Dove	1974	Symphonieorchester des Bayerischen Rundfunks	Deutsche Grammophon
Dvořák	The Wild Dove	1976	Symphonieorchester des Bayerischen Rundfunks	Deutsche Grammophon
Grieg	Piano Concerto	1964	Berliner Philharmoniker	Deutsche Grammophon
Hindemith	Chamber Music No. 5	1966	Symphonieorchester des Bayerischen Rundfunks	Bayerischer Rundfunk
Hindemith	Concerto Music, Op. 48	1963	Symphonieorchester des Bayerischen Rundfunks	Bayerischer Rundfunk
Hindemith	Der Schwanendreher	1968	Symphonieorchester des Bayerischen Rundfunks	Bayerischer Rundfunk
Janáček	Concertino	1970	Symphonieorchester des Bayerischen Rundfunks	Deutsche Grammophon
Janáček	The Diary of One Who Disappeared		Symphonieorchester des Bayerischen Rundfunks	Deutsche Grammophon
Janáček	Glagolitic Mass		Symphonieorchester des Bayerischen Rundfunks	Deutsche Grammophon
Janáček	Sinfonietta	1970	Symphonieorchester des Bayerischen Rundfunks	Deutsche Grammophon
Janáček	Taras Bulba	1951	Royal Concertgebouw Orchestra	Radio Netherlands
Janáček	Taras Bulba	1970	Symphonieorchester des Bayerischen Rundfunks	Deutsche Grammophon
Mahler	Symphony No. 1 "Titan"	1967	Symphonieorchester des Bayerischen Rundfunks	Deutsche Grammophon
Mahler	Symphony No. 1 "Titan"	1979	Symphonieorchester des Bayerischen Rundfunks	Bayerischer Rundfunk
Mahler	Symphony No. 2 "Resurrection"	1969	Symphonieorchester des Bayerischen Rundfunks	Deutsche Grammophon
Mahler	Symphony No. 2 "Resurrection"	1982	Symphonieorchester des Bayerischen Rundfunks	Bayerischer Rundfunk
Mahler	Symphony No. 3	1967	Symphonieorchester des Bayerischen Rundfunks	Deutsche Grammophon
Mahler	Symphony No. 4	1968	Symphonieorchester des Bayerischen Rundfunks	Deutsche Grammophon
Mahler	Symphony No. 5	1971	Symphonieorchester des Bayerischen Rundfunks	Deutsche Grammophon
Mahler	Symphony No. 5	1981	Symphonieorchester des Bayerischen Rundfunks	Bayerischer Rundfunk
Mahler	Symphony No. 6 "Tragic"	1968	Symphonieorchester des Bayerischen Rundfunks	Deutsche Grammophon
Mahler	Symphony No. 7	1970	Symphonieorchester des Bayerischen Rundfunks	Deutsche Grammophon
Mahler	Symphony No. 8 "Symphony of a Thousand"	1970	Symphonieorchester des Bayerischen Rundfunks	Deutsche Grammophon
Mahler	Symphony No. 9	1967	Symphonieorchester des Bayerischen Rundfunks	Deutsche Grammophon
Mahler	Symphony No. 10	1968	Symphonieorchester des Bayerischen Rundfunks	Deutsche Grammophon
Mendelssohn	Violin Concerto	1951	Royal Concertgebouw Orchestra	Radio Netherlands
Mozart	Eine kleine Nachtmusik	1962	Wiener Philharmoniker	EMI
Mozart	Mass No. 9 in B Flat major KV 275 (Missa brevis)	1973	Symphonieorchester des Bayerischen Rundfunks	Deutsche Grammophon
Mozart	Symphony No. 36 KV 425 "Linz"	1962	Wiener Philharmoniker	EMI
Rachmaninoff	Piano Concerto No. 2	1951	Royal Concertgebouw Orchestra	Radio Netherlands
Schoenberg	Piano Concerto	1972	Symphonieorchester des Bayerischen Rundfunks	Deutsche Grammophon
Schoenberg	Violin Concerto	1972	Symphonieorchester des Bayerischen Rundfunks	Deutsche Grammophon
Schubert	Symphony No. 9	1960	Royal Philharmonic Orchestra	EMI
Schumann	Symphonies	1979	Symphonieorchester des Bayerischen Rundfunks	CBS / Sony Classical
Schumann	Piano Concerto	1964	Berliner Philharmoniker	Deutsche Grammophon
Smetana	Má vlast	1971	Boston Symphony Orchestra	Deutsche Grammophon
Tansman	Music for Orchestra	1950	Royal Concertgebouw Orchestra	Radio Netherlands
Tchaikovsky	Symphony No. 4	1961	Wiener Philharmoniker	EMI
Verdi	Rigoletto	1964	Orchester del Teatro alla Scala	Deutsche Grammophon
Wagner	Lohengrin	1971	Symphonieorchester des Bayerischen Rundfunks	Deutsche Grammophon
Weber	Der Freischütz	1980	Symphonieorchester des Bayerischen Rundfunks	Decca
Weber	Oberon	1970	Symphonieorchester des Bayerischen Rundfunks	Deutsche Grammophon

== Bibliography ==
- Barenboim, Daniel (2002). A Life in Music. London: Arcade Pub. ISBN 1-55970-674-0.
- Freeman, John W. "Music First," Opera News, May 2007, pp. 42–45.
- Haltrecht, Montague (1975). The Quiet Showman – Sir David Webster and the Royal Opera House. London: Collins. ISBN 0-00-211163-2.
- Kennedy, Michael (1971). Barbirolli, Conductor Laureate: The Authorised Biography. London: MacGibbon and Key. ISBN 0-261-63336-8.
- Kenyon, Nicholas (1981). The BBC Symphony Orchestra – The First Fifty Years, 1930–1980. London: British Broadcasting Corporation. ISBN 0563176172.
- Rosenthal, Harold (1958). Two Centuries of Opera at Covent Garden. London: Putnam. OCLC 185327768.
- Scharf, Albert (2006). "Rafael Kubelík: His Life and Achievement". "The golden era" of Rafael Kubelik: the Munich years 1961–1985. Kassel: Bärenreiter. ISBN 3761819129.

Cultural offices
Preceded by Karl Rankl	Music Director, Royal Opera House, Covent Garden; 1955–1958	Succeeded by Georg Solti
Preceded by none	Music Director, Metropolitan Opera; 1973–1974	Succeeded by James Levine
