= István Kertész (conductor) =

Hungarian orchestral and operatic conductor

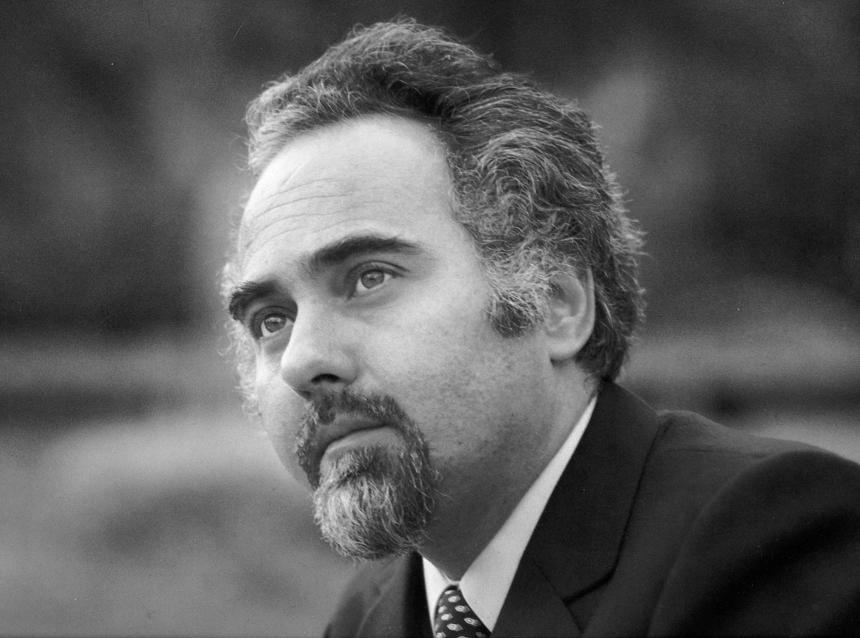
- Born: 28 August 1929; Budapest, Hungary
- Died: 16 April 1973 (aged 43); Near Herzliya, Israel
- Spouse: Edith Kertész-Gabry (m. 1951)
- Children: 3 (Gabor, Peter, and Katharine)

István Kertész (28 August 1929 – 16 April 1973) was a Hungarian orchestral and operatic conductor who led many of the world's orchestras, including the Cleveland, Chicago, Philadelphia, New York, Los Angeles, Pittsburgh, Detroit, San Francisco and Minnesota Orchestras in the United States, as well as the London Symphony, Vienna Philharmonic, Berlin Philharmonic, Royal Concertgebouw Orchestra, Israel Philharmonic, and L'Orchestre de la Suisse Romande.

Kertész's orchestral repertoire numbered over 450 works from all periods, and was matched by a repertoire of some sixty operas ranging from Mozart, Verdi, Puccini and Wagner to the more contemporary Prokofiev, Bartók, Britten, Kodály, Poulenc and Janáček. Kertész was part of a musical tradition that produced fellow Hungarian conductors Fritz Reiner, Antal Doráti, János Ferencsik, Eugene Ormandy, George Szell, János Fürst, Peter Erős, Ferenc Fricsay, and Georg Solti.

== Early life ==
=== Childhood ===
Kertész was born in Budapest, Hungary, in 1929, the first child of Margit Muresian and Miklós Kertész. His sister, Vera, was born four years later. Miklós Kertész, born in Szécsény, Hungary into a large Jewish family, was the director of a leather-works and died of appendicitis in 1938. Margit Muresian Kertész went to work to support her family. At an early age Kertész showed a great affinity for music, and began violin lessons. "When I was six and started music," he told a High Fidelity interviewer, "it was 1935 and cruel things were going on in Europe ... I found my 'exile' in music, practicing the piano, the fiddle, and writing little compositions."

=== World War II and the Holocaust ===
With the failure of Hungary's efforts to negotiate an armistice with the western Allies, German forces occupied Hungary on 19 March 1944. Aware of what was happening to Jews throughout Europe, the family went into hiding. Most of Kertész's extended family were deported to Auschwitz in July 1944 and did not survive the Holocaust.

At the insistence of his mother, and despite the wartime interruptions of air raids, deportations, starvation and invasions by both Germans and later, the Russians, István Kertész continued his musical studies. By the time he was twelve, Kertész began to study the piano and composition in addition to the violin. The young Kertész, along with his sister, took advantage of Budapest's rich cultural life and attended symphonic or operatic performances almost every evening. It was at this time that Kertész decided to become a conductor. After the war, he resumed his formal studies and attended the Kölcsey-Gymnasium where, in 1947, he graduated with honors.

That same year, István Kertész enrolled as a scholarship student at the Royal Academy of Music, now the Franz Liszt Academy of Music in Budapest, where he studied violin, piano and composition with Zoltán Kodály, Leó Weiner and Rezső Kókai. Developing his keen interest in conducting, Kertész became a student of János Ferencsik and László Somogyi. At the conservatory, Kertész also met his wife, the lyric soprano Edith Gancs, whom he married in 1951. She later changed her name to Edith Kertész-Gabry. The pair were part of a cohort of musicians. Musically, Kertész was most influenced by László Somogyi, Bruno Walter and Otto Klemperer, then the director of the Budapest Opera.

== Career ==
On 17 December 1948, István Kertész made his debut as a conductor with an all-Mozart programme.

=== Budapest ===
In 1953 Kertész was chosen as Chief Conductor of the Philharmonic Orchestra at Győr, a post that he held for two years. During this period he had the opportunity to develop a broad symphonic repertoire, leading the Budapest Opera Orchestra from 1955 to 1957, and working as an Assistant Professor of Conducting at the Franz Liszt Academy of Music. After the upheaval of the Hungarian Revolution, and with a young family in tow, Kertész left Hungary. Offered a fellowship to the Accademia Nazionale di Santa Cecilia in Rome, Kertész studied with Fernando Previtali while his wife, Edith Kertész-Gabry sang at the Bremen Opera. Kertész graduated with distinction, and was given the highest award of the Accademia, the "Premio d'Atri". Moreover, Previtali chose Kertész for his "Corso di Perfezionamento" for two successive seasons, during which Kertész conducted the Santa Cecilia Orchestra forty times.

After completing his studies in Rome, Kertész was engaged as a guest conductor of the Hamburg Symphony Orchestra and the Hamburg State Opera. Guest conducting there, as well as in Wiesbaden and Hanover, he conducted Fidelio and La bohème.

=== Augsburg Opera ===
In March 1960, Kertész was invited to become general music director of the Augsburg Opera—a post especially created for him. There he conducted performances of Mozart's The Magic Flute, Die Entführung aus dem Serail, Così fan tutte, and The Marriage of Figaro, earning himself a reputation as an interpreter of Mozart's work. He also conducted performances of Verdi's Rigoletto, Don Carlos, Otello and Falstaff, and Richard Strauss's Salome, Arabella, and Der Rosenkavalier. Invited to the Salzburg Festival, he conducted Die Entführung aus dem Serail in 1961, and The Magic Flute in 1963. During this time, he also gave the first of many performances at the Deutsche Oper Berlin, and conducted the Berlin Philharmonic, London Symphony Orchestra, Israel Philharmonic Orchestra, San Francisco Opera, North German Radio Symphony Orchestra, Hamburg Symphony, Munich Philharmonic, Bavarian Radio Symphony Orchestra, the Festival dei Due Mondi in Spoleto where he conducted Prokofiev's The Fiery Angel.

Kertész's earliest recordings include Beethoven's Symphony No. 2 and Symphony No. 4. Having already recorded for EMI/Columbia records, Kertész now signed an exclusive contract with Decca/London. His British debut was with the Royal Liverpool Philharmonic Orchestra in 1960. He made his US debut during the 1961–62 season, also beginning an association with the Israel Philharmonic Orchestra whom he guest-conducted at Tel Aviv's Mann Auditorium in March 1962. Eventually, Kertész conducted over 378 compositions with the Israel Philharmonic over an eleven-year period.

=== Cologne Opera ===
In 1964, Kertész received an appointment as the general music director of the Cologne Opera where he conducted the first German performance of Benjamin Britten's Billy Budd and Verdi's Stiffelio, as well as the Mozart operas La clemenza di Tito, Don Giovanni, Così fan tutte and The Magic Flute.

While he established a good rapport with the often critical Cologne audience, they were sometimes unhappy with his often fast tempi. His 1970 Aida, with Martina Arroyo in the title role, with one interval and some cuts, lasted under three hours.

=== London Symphony Orchestra ===
Retaining his previous position as director of the Cologne Opera, he also became principal conductor of the London Symphony Orchestra from 1965 to 1968, and made guest appearances at the Royal Opera House, Covent Garden. During his three years as principal conductor of the LSO, Kertész made recordings of the nine Dvořák symphonies, which included the first complete recording of the Symphony No. 1. The LSO dispensed with him when he sought control of all artistic matters; his contract was not renewed when it expired in 1968.

During this period in Kertész's career, in 1965 he recorded Bartók's Bluebeard's Castle with Christa Ludwig singing the role of Judith and Walter Berry in the title role. Kertész's interpretation of Bartók's difficult, brooding work is considered by many to be the benchmark performance of the opera; "the playing of the London Symphony Orchestra, and Kertész's instinctive shaping of the drama ... has never been surpassed."

Kertész was a frequent guest conductor of the Israel Philharmonic Orchestra, the Vienna Philharmonic, the Philadelphia Orchestra, the Chicago Symphony Orchestra, and numerous other orchestras. He was appointed principal conductor of the Bamberg Symphony in 1973. The Cleveland Orchestra unsuccessfully bid for his appointment as musical director the year before. In a poll, the Cleveland musicians had given 96 "first-choice" votes to Kertész as the replacement for George Szell, and only two for Lorin Maazel, Cleveland's eventual choice. In Chicago, Kertész conducted his first performance at the Ravinia Festival in July 1967; he was the Festival's principal conductor from 1970 to 1972.

== Death ==
On 16 April 1973, while on a concert tour, Kertész drowned while swimming off the coast of Israel at Herzliya. He had been recording Brahms's Variations on a Theme by Haydn, as well as the complete Brahms symphonies. After his death, and in tribute to him, the Vienna Philharmonic finished recording the Haydn Variations without a conductor.

Kertész was survived by his wife, operatic soprano Edith Kertész-Gabry, his children, Gábor, Péter, and Kathrin, his mother, Margit Muresian Kertész Halmos, and his sister, the graphic artist Vera Kertész.

== International orchestras ==
István Kertész served as principal and or guest conductor with the following orchestras: Bamberg Symphony Orchestra, Berlin Philharmonic, Chicago Symphony Orchestra, Cleveland Orchestra, Royal Concertgebouw Orchestra (Amsterdam), Detroit Symphony Orchestra, Gürzenich Orchestra (Cologne), Israel Philharmonic Orchestra, Japan Philharmonic Orchestra (Tokyo), London Symphony Orchestra, Los Angeles Philharmonic, Minnesota Orchestra, New Philharmonia Orchestra (London), Munich Philharmonic Orchestra, New York Philharmonic, Symphonieorchester des Bayerischen Rundfunks (Munich), Orquesta Nacional (Madrid), Orchestre Radio-Télévision (Paris), Orchestre de la Suisse Romande (Geneva), Philadelphia Orchestra, Pittsburgh Symphony Orchestra, Radio Symphony Orchestra (Berlin), Opera Orchestra of Santa Cecila (Rome), San Francisco Symphony, Symphonie Orchester des Norddeutschen Rundfunks (Hamburg), Royal Stockholm Philharmonic Orchestra, Tonhalle-Orchester (Zürich), Vienna Philharmonic Orchestra.

== Discography ==
His many recordings include the first complete recording of Mozart's La clemenza di Tito. He was also the first to record the complete Dvořák symphonies and his interpretations of them are still considered classics of their kind. Pianists Clifford Curzon, Hans Richter-Haaser, Vladimir Ashkenazy and Julius Katchen each made records with Kertész. He recorded Kodály's Psalmus Hungaricus and Peacock Variations.

- Bartók, Béla, Bluebeard's Castle (Ludwig, Berry), London Symphony Orchestra (1965), DECCA SET 311
- Bartók, Béla, Piano Concerto No. 3 in E, Sz. 119 (Katchen), London Symphony Orchestra (1965), DECCA SXL 6209
- Beethoven, Ludwig van
  - Coriolan Overture, Op. 62, Bamberg Symphony Orchestra (1961), ARIOLA/Bacc. ZK 7928
  - Egmont Overture, Op. 84, Bamberg Symphony Orchestra, DENON
  - Leonore Overture No. 3, Op. 72b, Bamberg Symphony Orchestra, DENON
- Beethoven, Ludwig van
  - Piano Concerto No. 3 in C minor, Op. 37, Bamberg Symphony Orchestra, OPERA EPK 3269
  - Piano Concerto No. 4 in G major, Op. 95 (Hans Richter-Haaser), Philharmonia Orchestra and Rondo No. 2 in G, Op. 51 (1961), COLUMBIA
- Beethoven, Ludwig van
  - Symphony No. 2 in D major, Op. 36, Bamberg Symphony Orchestra (1961), OPERA EPK S 91
  - Symphony No. 4 in B-flat major, Op. 60, Bamberg Symphony Orchestra (1961), DENON COGQ-1008
  - Symphony No. 7 in A major, Op. 92, Bamberg Symphony Orchestra (1964), OPERA
- Brahms,
  - Serenade No. 1 in D major, Op. 11, London Symphony Orchestra (1967), DECCA SXL 6340
  - Serenade No. 2 in A major, Op. 16, London Symphony Orchestra (1967), DECCA SXL 6368
- Brahms,
  - Symphony No. 1 in C minor, Op. 68, Vienna Philharmonic Orchestra (1973), DECCA SXL 6675
  - Symphony No. 2 in D major, Op. 73, Vienna Philharmonic Orchestra (1964), DECCA SXL 6172
  - Symphony No. 3 in F major, Op. 90, Vienna Philharmonic Orchestra (1973), DECCA SXL 6677
  - Symphony No. 4 in E minor, Op. 98, Vienna Philharmonic Orchestra (1972), DECCA SXL 6678
- Brahms, Variations on a Theme by Haydn, Op. 56, Vienna Philharmonic Orchestra (1973), DECCA SXL 6677
- Bruckner, Symphony No. 4 in E-flat major, "Romantic", London Symphony Orchestra (1965), DECCA SXL 6227
- Donizetti, Don Pasquale (Sciutti, Corena, Krause, Oncina), Vienna State Opera Orchestra and Choir (1964), DECCA SET 280/81
- Dvořák, Overtures:
  - In Nature's Realm, London Symphony Orchestra (1966), DECCA SXL 6348
  - Carneval, London Symphony Orchestra (1965), DECCA SXL 6348
  - Otello, London Symphony Orchestra (1965), DECCA SXL 6348
  - Scherzo Capriccioso London Symphony Orchestra (1963), DECCA SXL 6348
- Dvořák, Requiem, Op. 89 (Lorengar, Komlossy, Ilosfalvy, Krause), London Symphony Orchestra (1968), DECCA SET 416/7
- Dvořák, Serenade in D minor for Winds, Op. 44, London Symphony Orchestra (1968), DECCA SXL 6368
- Dvořák, Slavonic Dances Nos. 1, 3, 8, 9, 10, Israel Philharmonic Orchestra (1962), DECCA SXL 6024
- Dvořák, Symphonic Poems: Hussite, My Home, The Noonday Witch, The Water Goblin, London Symphony Orchestra, (1965, 1965, 1970, 1970 respectively) DECCA SXL 6543
- Dvořák, Symphonic Variations, London Symphony Orchestra (1970), DECCA SXL 6510
- Dvořák,
  - Symphony No. 1 in C minor, London Symphony Orchestra (1966), DECCA SXL 6288
  - Symphony No. 2 in B-flat major, London Symphony Orchestra (1966), DECCA SXL 6289
  - Symphony No. 3 in E-flat major, London Symphony Orchestra (1966), DECCA SXL 6290
  - Symphony No. 4 in D minor, London Symphony Orchestra (1966), DECCA SXL 6257
  - Symphony No. 5 in F major, London Symphony Orchestra (1965), DECCA SXL 6273
  - Symphony No. 6 in D major, London Symphony Orchestra (1965), DECCA SXL 6253
  - Symphony No. 7 in D minor, London Symphony Orchestra (1964), DECCA SXL 6115
  - Symphony No. 8 in G major, London Symphony Orchestra (1963), DECCA SXL 6044
  - Symphony No. 9 in E minor "From the New World" VPO DECCA r&i:61, SXL 2289
  - Symphony No. 9 in E minor "From the New World" London Symphony Orchestra (1966), DECCA SXL 6291
- Egk, Werner, Furchtlosigkeit und Wohlwollen, (Wunderlich) Bavarian Radio Symphony Orchestra & Chorus, Orfeo 510011
- Gershwin, George, Rhapsody in Blue (Katchen), London Symphony Orchestra (1968), DECCA SXL 6411
- Grieg, Piano Concerto in A minor (Katchen), Israel Philharmonic Orchestra (1962), DECCA SMD 1152
- Haydn
  - Symphony No. 45 in F-sharp minor, "Farewell" Bamberg Symphony Orchestra,
  - Symphony No. 104 in D major, "London" ARIOLA/Bacc. ZK 80051
- Kodály, Háry János, Edinburgh Festival Chorus and the London Symphony Orchestra (1968), DECCA SET 399/400
- Kodály
  - Háry János Suite
  - Dances of Galanta (Szönyi), London Symphony Orchestra (1964), DECCA SXL 6136
- Kodály, Psalmus Hungaricus, Op. 13, London Symphony Orchestra (1969/70), DECCA SXL 6497
- Kodály, Peacock Variations, London Symphony Orchestra (1969/70), DECCA
- Liszt
  - Piano Concerto No. 1 in E-flat major, S. 124
  - Piano Concerto No. 2 in A major (Karolyi), S. 125, Julian von Károlyi, Philharmonia Hungarica (1961), EMI C 047 - 50517
- Mozart, Così fan tutte, K. 588 (selections) (Popp, Fassbaender, Krause), Vienna Haydn Orchestra (1965), DECCA 433 066-2
- Mozart, Die Entführung aus dem Serail, (Wunderlich, Putz, Holm, Wolf, Wohlfahrt, Littasy), K.384, Salzburger Festspiele (1961), DECCA DK 11 560/1-2
- Mozart, Die Zauberflöte, K. 620 (Popp, Krauss, Krenn), Vienna Haydn Orchestra (1967), DECCA DK 11 560/1-2
- Mozart, La Clemenza di Tito, K. 621 (Berganza, Casula, Fassbaender, Popp, Krenn, Franc), Vienna State Opera Orchestra and Choir (1967), DECCA SET 357/59
- Mozart, "Masonic Funeral Music", (Fischer, Krenn, Krause), London Symphony Orchestra (1968), DECCA SXL 6409
- Mozart:
  - Piano Concerto No. 8 in C major, K. 246
  - Piano Concerto No. 9 in E-flat major, "Jeunehomme", K. 271
  - Rondo in A minor, K. 511 (Ashkenazy), London Symphony Orchestra (1966), DECCA SXL 6259
- Mozart
  - Piano Concerto No. 17 in G major, K. 453
  - Piano Concerto No. 26 in D major, "Coronation", K. 537 (Richter-Haaser), London Philharmonia Orchestra, EMI 1 047 - 50506
- Mozart
  - Piano Concerto No. 23 in A major, K. 488
  - Piano Concerto No. 24 in C minor, K. 491 (Curzon), London Symphony Orchestra (1967, DECCA SXL 6354
- Mozart, Piano Concerto No. 27 in B-flat major, K.595 (Curzon), London Symphony Orchestra (1967), Philips-DECCA 456757
- Mozart, "Mozart Festival", Vol. I, Vienna Haydn Orchestra, DECCA DK 11 536/1-2
- Mozart, "Mozart Festival", Vol. II, Vienna Philharmonic Orchestra, DECCA DK 11 560/1-2
- Mozart, Requiem in D minor, K. 626 (Ameling, Horne, Benelli, Franc), Vienna Philharmonic Orchestra (1965), DECCA SMD 1242
- Mozart
  - Sinfonia Concertante in E-flat major, K. 364
  - Clarinet Concerto in A major, K. 622 (Lautenbacher, Koch, Dörr), Bamberg Symphony Orchestra, Turnabout STV 34 098
- Mozart
  - Sonata for Organ and Orchestra No. 5
  - Sonata for Organ and Orchestra No. 11 in D, K. 245
  - Sonata for Organ and Orchestra No. 13
  - Sonata for Organ and Orchestra No. 14 (Ella), Corelli Chamber Orchestra, Hungaraton HCD 128662
- Mozart
  - Symphony No. 25 in G minor, K. 183/173 dB, Vienna Philharmonic Orchestra (1972), DECCA/Vienna (Sofiensaal) KING 230E 51016
  - Symphony No. 29 in A major, K. 201, Vienna Philharmonic Orchestra (1973), DECCA/Vienna (Sofiensaal) KING 230E 51016
  - Symphony No. 35 in D major, "Haffner", K.385, Vienna Philharmonic Orchestra (1962), DECCA/Vienna (Sofiensaal) KING 230E 51016
- Mozart
  - Symphony No. 33 in B-flat major, K. 319, Vienna Philharmonic Orchestra (1963), DECCA SXL 6056
  - Symphony No. 39 in E-flat major, K. 543, Vienna Philharmonic Orchestra (1962), DECCA SXL 6056
- Mozart
  - Symphony No. 36 in C major, "Linz", K. 425, Vienna Philharmonic Orchestra (1963), Vienna (Sofiensaal)/KING
  - Symphony No. 40 in G Minor, K. 550, Vienna Philharmonic Orchestra (1972), Vienna (Sofiensaal)/KING
- Mozart
  - Eine kleine Nachtmusik in G major, K. 525 Vienna Philharmonic Orchestra (1963), DECCA SXL 6091
- Mozart, Coronation Mass in C major, K. 317, (Kertész-Gabry, Rössel-Majdan, Kmentt, Weiner), Vienna Philharmonic Orchestra (1963), OPERA EPK 3257
- Prokofiev, Piano Concerto No. 3 in C major, op. 26 (Katchen), London Symphony Orchestra (1968), DECCA SXL 6411
- Ravel, Concerto for Piano and Orchestra in G (Katchen), London Symphony Orchestra (1968), DECCA SXL 6209
- Ravel, Concerto for the Left Hand in D major (Katchen), London Symphony Orchestra (1968), DECCA SXL 6411
- Respighi
  - Pines of Rome
  - Fountains of Rome
  - The Birds (Gli uccelli), London Symphony Orchestra (1968), DECCA SXL 6401
- Rossini, Stabat Mater Pilar Lorengar, Luciano Pavarotti, Yvonne Minton, Sotin, London Symphony Orchestra (1970/1), DECCA SXL 6524
- Shostakovich, Symphony No. 5 in D minor, Op. 47, Orchestre de la Suisse Romande (1962), DECCA SXL 6018
- Schubert
  - Symphony No. 1 in D major, D. 82, Vienna Philharmonic Orchestra (1971), DECCA SXL 6552
  - Symphony No. 2 in B-flat major, D. 125, Vienna Philharmonic Orchestra (1971), DECCA SXL 6552
  - Symphony No. 3 in D major, D. 200, Vienna Philharmonic Orchestra (1971), DECCA SXL 6553
  - Symphony No. 4 in C minor, "Tragic", D. 417, Vienna Philharmonic Orchestra (1970), DECCA SXL 6483
  - Symphony No. 5 in B-flat major, D. 485, Vienna Philharmonic Orchestra (1970), DECCA SXL 6483
  - Symphony No. 6 in C major, "The Little C major", D. 589, Vienna Philharmonic Orchestra (1970), DECCA SXL 6553
  - Symphony No. 8/7 in B minor, "Unfinished", D. 759, Vienna Philharmonic Orchestra (1963), DECCA SXL6090
  - Symphony No. 9/7/8 in C major, "The Great C major", D. 944, Vienna Philharmonic Orchestra (1962), DECCA SXL 6089
  - Overtures Des Teufels Lustschloss, D. 84, in the Italian style in C major, D. 591, Fierabras, D. 796, Vienna Philharmonic Orchestra (1963), DECCA SXL6090
- Schumann, Piano Concerto in A minor, Op. 54 (Katchen), Israel Philharmonic Orchestra(1962), DECCA SMD 1152
- Smetana, Bohemian Rhapsody: The Moldau, The Bartered Bride Overture, Israel Philharmonic Orchestra (1962), DECCA SXL 6024
- Strauss, Franz, Horn Concerto, Op. 8, (Barry Tuckwell), London Symphony Orchestra (1966), DECCA SXL 6285
- Strauss, Richard, Horn Concertos, Nos. 1-2, (Barry Tuckwell), London Symphony Orchestra (1966), Decca BDX1259
- Verdi, Otello, Augsburg State Opera (1962), OPERA EPK 1220

== Bibliography ==
- Holmes, John L.: Conductors. A record collector's guide, Gollancz Ltd. 1988.
- Jaeger, Stefan. Das Atlantisbuch der Dirigenten, Atlantis Musikbuch-Verlag, 1985.
- Lyman, Darryl. Great Jews in Music, J. D. Publishers, 1986.
- Morrison, Richard (2004). Orchestra. London: Faber and Faber. ISBN 0-571-21584-X.
- Myers, Kurtz. Index to record reviews 1984–1987, G.K. Hall, 1989.
- Pâris, Alain. Dictionnaire des interpretes et de l'interpretation musicale au XX siecle, Robert Laffont, 1989.
- Sadie, Stanley. The New Grove Dictionary of Music and Musicians, Macmillan, 1980.
