= Symphony No. 3 (Dvořák) =

1874 composition by Antonín Dvořák

- by Antonín Dvořák
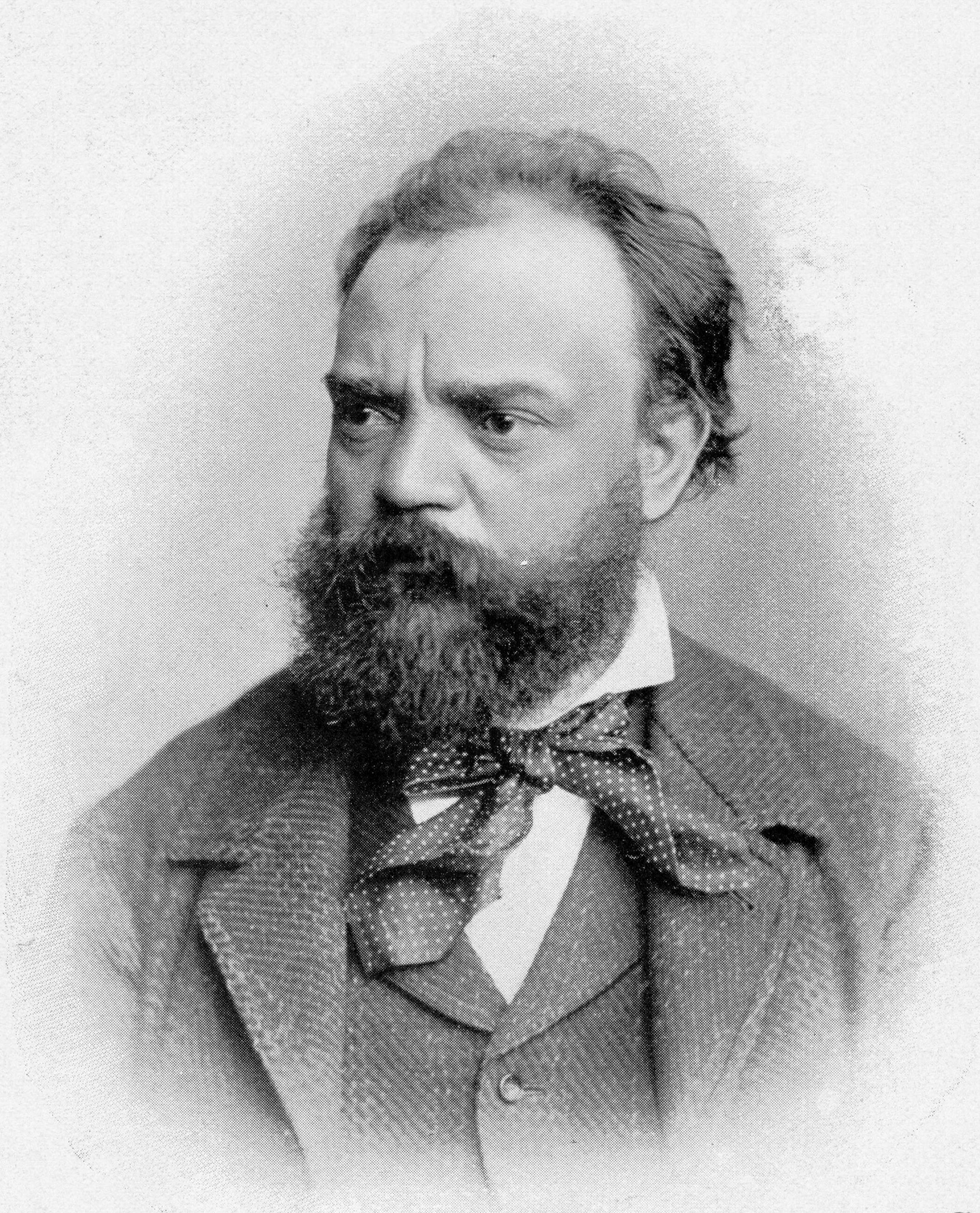
- Dvořák in 1879
- Key: E-flat major
- Catalogue: B. 34
- Opus: 10
- Composed: 1873
- Movements: 3

Premiere
- Date: 29 March 1874
- Location: Prague
- Conductor: Bedřich Smetana
- Performers: Prague Philharmonic Orchestra

The Symphony No. 3 in E♭ major, Op. 10, B. 34, is a classical composition by Antonín Dvořák.

It is not known precisely when the work was created (Dvořák scratched out the note on the title page with a knife so effectively that it is not possible to reconstruct the most important data). However, the symphony was composed probably in 1872, but possibly not scored until the following year. It is also not possible to find out with certainty the original version of the work.

== Background ==
While he composed his third symphony, Dvořák was a violist in the orchestra of the Provisional Theatre in Prague, which intensified his infatuation with the works of German composer Richard Wagner, whose influence is seen more heavily in this symphony than any of his others. Dvořák began working on the symphony in April 1873 and completed it in July. He began composing his fourth symphony later the same year.

It was a successful period of Dvořák's career. In the spring of 1873 he had his first major success with the hymn "The Heirs of the White Mountain", an orchestral setting of an epic poem by Czech poet Vítězslav Hálek. According to Dvořák's biographer Otakar Šourek, the same sense of patriotism that Dvořák expressed in the hymn can be seen in his third symphony. However, composing the symphony was a challenge for Dvořák, who, after orchestrating it, "burned the work" because he "did not like it", according to the notes he scrawled in the margins of the autograph score.

The symphony is generally typical of Dvořák's style due to its broad, flowing melodies, the variety of interrelated musical ideas within movements, and an exuberant and optimistic finale. But the symphony does also display some clear shifts from Dvořák's earlier work. It was written seven years after his second symphony, during which period he wrote numerous other works, including chamber music, vocal music, opera, and other orchestral music. The symphony is generally considered to show significant progress in compositional skill from his second symphony. It shows a greater sense of structural coherence due to its Classical-style structure and a more direct approach to thematic material. The first movement in particular is in sonata form in the style of Haydn. Dvořák does also make use of Romantic styles, particularly with regard to the orchestration with his use of tuba, English horn, piccolo, harp, and triangle.

Many of Dvořák's early works seem to have Wagnerian influences, but this symphony is widely considered to be the most Wagnerian of them all. Throughout the symphony his use of harp is particularly Wagnerian. The influence of Wagner is particularly notable in the second movement, where Dvořák seems to allude to motifs from Wagner's Ring Cycle, as well as using harmonies and orchestrations in the style of Wagner, particularly in the strings, harp, and brass.

== Instrumentation and form ==
The work is scored for an orchestra of two flutes, one piccolo, two oboes, English horn, two clarinets, two bassoons, four horns, two trumpets, three trombones, tuba, timpani, triangle, harp, and strings.

External audio
- Performed by the Berlin Philharmonic under Rafael Kubelík
- I. Allegro moderato
- II. Adagio molto, tempo di marcia
- III. Finale (Allegro vivace)

The work, unlike his other symphonies, is in three movements:

1. Allegro moderato (E♭ major), 343 measures
2. Adagio molto, tempo di marcia (C♯ minor → C♯ major), 273 measures
3. Allegro vivace (E♭ major), 760 measures

There is no scherzo, this being the only three-movement symphony he wrote. The Adagio molto is his longest symphonic slow movement, and the Allegro vivace is the shortest finale. A typical performance of the work has a duration of about thirty minutes.

Critic Ludevít Procházka felt that the three movements could be three symphonic poems but the absence of a scherzo prevented the work from truly being a symphony. However, an examination of the music itself reveals more unity than Procházka saw. The first and third movements center on E♭, F♯, and A♭ major, while the second movement is in C♯ minor, the dominant of F♯. In addition, both the second and third movements contain allusions to thematic material from the first movement to foster a sense of symphonic unity.

== Reception ==
Dvořák submitted this symphony along with his fourth symphony (completed in the early months of 1874) in an application for a state scholarship, which he was granted. Despite its unusual structure and Wagnerian influences, the symphony captured the attention of German composer Johannes Brahms, who was notorious for his musical conservatism. The symphony represented a milestone in Dvořák's career in that it marked the beginning of his association with the musical establishment in Vienna.

It was premiered by Prague Philharmonic Orchestra on 29 March 1874 at the fourth philharmonic concert in the hall on Žofín (Sophia Island), conducted by Bedřich Smetana. The composition was revised by Dvořák in 1887–1889, though not printed until 1912 (after the composer's death) by N. Simrock in Berlin. It was the first of his symphonies that Dvořák heard performed. In another performance a few months later, Smetana included the scherzo from Dvořák's fourth symphony.

In a review in the Czech newspaper Národní listy in 1874, Ludevít Procházka praised the symphony as breathtaking, enthusiastic, and imaginative, but wrote that Dvořák was "as yet unable to control the high-spirited steed of his imagination". He saw promise in the young Dvořák nonetheless, commending the finale for its reminiscence of "the spirit of Beethoven", and writing that with time Dvořák could truly achieve greatness in his symphonic works.

== Recordings ==
The first complete recording of the work was made in 1950, with Henry Swoboda conducting the Wiener Symphoniker. The first recording on a major label, and one that has constantly been in print, was István Kertész conducting the London Symphony Orchestra for his complete cycle of the Dvořák symphonies on Decca.

Year	Conductor	Orchestra	Label
1950	Henry Swoboda	Wiener Symphoniker	Westminster
1959	Václav Smetáček	Prague Symphony Orchestra	Supraphon
1966	István Kertész	London Symphony Orchestra	Decca
1971	Witold Rowicki	London Symphony Orchestra	Philips
1972	Rafael Kubelík	Berlin Philharmonic	Deutsche Grammophon
1973	Václav Neumann	Czech Philharmonic	Supraphon
1978	Otmar Suitner	Staatskapelle Berlin	Berlin Classics
1979	Zdenĕk Košler	Slovak Philharmonic	Opus
1979	Andrew Davis	Philharmonia Orchestra	RCA
1984	Gennady Rozhdestvensky	USSR Ministry of Culture Symphony Orchestra	Melodiya
1985	Václav Neumann	Czech Philharmonic	Supraphon
1987	Neeme Järvi	Royal Scottish National Orchestra	Chandos
1989	Libor Pešek	Royal Liverpool Philharmonic	Virgin Classics
1990	Stephen Gunzenhauser	Slovak State Philharmonic Orchestra	Naxos
1992	Zdeněk Mácal	Milwaukee Symphony Orchestra	Koss
1997	Myung-Whun Chung	Vienna Philharmonic	Deutsche Grammophon
2003	Ivan Anguelov	Slovak Radio Symphony Orchestra	Oehms
2003	Vladimír Válek	Czech Radio Symphony Orchestra	Supraphon
2004	Zdeněk Mácal	Czech Philharmonic	Octavia Records
2012	Jiří Bělohlávek	Czech Philharmonic	Decca
2012	José Serebrier	Bournemouth Symphony Orchestra	Warner
2012	Marcus Bosch	Staatsphilharmonie Nürnberg	Coviello Classics
2015	Karel Mark Chichon	Deutsche Radio Philharmonie	SWR
2020	Marek Štryncl	Musica Florea	Arta
2021	Nabil Shehata	Philharmonie Südwestfalen	Genuin

== Notes ==
=== Sources ===
- Dvořák, Antonín: Sinfonia III. Op. 10. Score. Prague: Editio Supraphon, 1989. H 3703.
