= Gabry =

Gabry or Gabrys is a name or a surname. It may refer to:

- Gabry Ponte (born 1973), Italian DJ, remixer, record producer, and radio personality
- Edith Kertész-Gabry (1927–2012), Hungarian soprano and professor of opera
- Juozas Gabrys (1880–1951), Lithuanian politician and diplomat
