= Handel Society of New York =

The Handel Society of New York (HSNY) was a New York City based musical organization that presented concert and semi-staged performances of operas and oratorios by George Frideric Handel from 1966-1974. The group mainly performed out of Carnegie Hall and was responsible for presenting the American and New York premieres of several works by Handel. The ensemble was also the first to record many of these works; releasing several LPs for RCA and Westminster Records.

== History ==
The HSNY was founded in January 1966 by talent manager Arthur Judson and New York businessman and music lover James Grayson. Grayson served as the group's Executive Director throughout the company's history. The ensemble's first music director was conductor Brian Priestman, and the group's longtime harpsichordist was Martin Isepp. The ensemble gave its debut performance, a semi-staged production of Xerxes, at Carnegie Hall on 20 November 1966 with Maureen Forrester in the title role, Maureen Lehane as Arsamene, Janet Baker as Amastre, Teresa Stich-Randall as Romilda, Alpha Brawner as Atalanta, John Shirley-Quirk as Ariodate, and Yi-Kwei Sze as Elviro. The same performers, with the additions of Regina Sarfaty as Eduige and Charles Bressler as Grimoaldo, were utilized the following week in semi-staged performances of Rodelinda. Both of these works were recorded on LPs for Westminster Records.

In 1966 the HSNY made their first recording for RCA Red Seal Records: the musical drama Hercules with Priestman conducting the Vienna Radio Symphony Orchestra. This was followed in 1968 with a recording of the oratorio Solomon with Shirley-Quirk in the title role. The recording was made in Austria with the orchestra of the Vienna Volksoper under conductor Stephen Simon. Simon was appointed the HSNY's new director in 1970, a position he remained in until the ensemble disbanded in 1974. Simon's first performance as music director was the United States premiere of Orlando presented in a concert version on January 18, 1971 at Carnegie Hall. The production starred Rosalind Elias in the title role with Camilla Williams as Angelica, Betty Allen as Medoro, Carole Bogard as Dorinda, and Justino Díaz as Zoroastro.

Under Simon's leadership, the HSNY presented two more United States premieres at Carnegie Hall. On March 29, 1971 the ensemble performed the American premiere of Ariodante in a concert version with mezzo-soprano Sophia Steffan in the title role and Judith Raskin as Ginerva. In March 1972 the HSNY introduced to American audiences Handel's Rinaldo in a concert version starring Beverly Wolff in the title role. The HSNY presented the New York premiere of Handel's Alcina, which had been performed only once before in the United States, under the baton of Priestman on March 25, 1974 with Cristina Deutekom in the title role and Karan Armstrong as Morgana.

In February 1973 Simon conducted the HSNY in their only performance of a non-Handel work, William Walton's Belshazzar's Feast, which was paired with an edited version of Handel's Belshazzar. Other Handel works which Simon conducted for the HSNY were the oratorios Solomon (1971), Athalia (1972), Judas Maccabaeus (1972), and Saul (1973); and the opera Ezio (1973). He conducted the HSNY's last concert, a performance of Handel's Samson, on April 23, 1974 with Richard Tucker in the title role.

== Partial discography ==
Year	Work	Cast	Conductor, Chorus and/or Orchestra	Label
1967	Solomon, an oratorio in 3 acts	Saramae Endich; Patricia Brooks; Alexander Young; John Shirley-Quirk	Stephen Simon (conductor); Vienna Youth Choir; Vienna Volksoper Orchestra	RCA Red Seal Records, 1968; 3 sound discs : 33 1/3 rpm, stereo; 12 in LP LSC 6187
1970	Orlando, opera in 3 acts	Sophia Steffan (Orlando); Graziella Sciutti (Angelica); Bernadette Greevy (Medoro); Carole Bogard (Dorinda); Marius Rintzler (Zoroastro)	Stephen Simon (conductor); Vienna Youth Choir; Vienna Volksoper Orchestra	RCA Red Seal Records, 1971; 3 sound discs : 33 1/3 rpm, stereo; 12 in LP LSC 6197
1970	Ariodante, opera in 3 acts	Sophia Steffan (Ariodante); Graziella Sciutti (Ginerva); Bernadette Greevy (Polinesso); Carole Bogard (Dalinda); Ian Partridge (Lurcanio); Marius Rintzler (King of Scotland)	Stephen Simon; Vienna Academy Choir; Vienna State Opera Chorus	RCA Red Seal Records, 1971; 3 sound discs : 33 1/3 rpm, stereo; 12 in LP LSC 6200
1972	Rinaldo, opera in 3 acts [excerpts]	Beverly Wolff (Rinaldo); Arleen Auger (Almirena); Rita Shane (Armida); Raymond Michalski (Argante)	Stephen Simon; Vienna Volksoper Orchestra	RCA Red Seal Records, 1973; 1 sound disc : 33 1/3 rpm, stereo; 12 in ARL1-0084
1974	Alcina, opera in 3 acts	Cristina Deutekom (Alcina); Beverly Wolff (Ruggiero); Karan Armstrong (Morgana); Lucia Valentini-Terrani (Bradamante); John Stewart (Oronte); Paul Plishka (Melisso)	Brian Priestman; Handel Society of New York Orchestra & Chorus	Gala GL 100.584
