= Henry Swoboda =

Henry Swoboda (29 October 1897, Prague – 13 August 1990, Rossinière) was a Czech-American conductor and musicologist.

== Life and career ==
He was born into the family of Heinrich Swoboda (born 1856), a Prague university professor (1914–1915 rector of the German Charles-Ferdinand University and his wife Alma, née Budinerová (born 1868), an alto singer. After studying at the Prague Conservatory with Václav Talich, in 1922, he received a doctorate in philosophy from the German Charles-Ferdinand University in Prague.

He worked from 1927 to 1931 for Electrola, Berlin and later as conductor for Radio-Prag. From 1931 to 1939 he was a visiting professor at the University of Southern California. In 1939, he emigrated to the United States, where he obtained citizenship in the mid-1940s.

Along with James Grayson and Mischa Naida, he was a co-founder of U.S. Westminster Records which flourished in the late 1940s and throughout the 1950s as a purveyor of classical music recordings. Swoboda made many recordings for Westminster and the Concert Hall record label, including the first commercially available recordings of Bruckner's Sixth Symphony and Dvořák's 3rd.

Other orchestral recordings include the CPE Bach Symphonies in C and D, Haydn Symphonies 77, 78, 94 & 100, Mozart Symphonies 29, 34, 35 & 40, Beethoven Christ on the Mount of Olives, Brahms Serenade No. 1, Verdi Quattro pezzi sacri, Dvorak Overtures 'Amid Nature', 'Carnival', 'Othello', Nocturne, Czech Suite, Tchaikovsky Souvenir de Florence, Symphony No. 3, Goldmark Rustic Wedding Symphony, Ibert Divertissement, Capriccio, Suite Elizabethiane, Kodály Te Deum, Theatre Overture, Martinů Concerto for Piano, Timpani and Double String Orchestra, and Hindemith The Four Temperaments and Kammermusik 4.
