= Steven Mercurio =

American conductor and composer (born 1956)

Steven Mercurio (born 1956, Bardonia, New York) is an American conductor and composer.

== Early life and education ==
Mercurio was raised in New York and is of Italian descent. For most of his adolescence, he gravitated towards rock and jazz music and played guitar in various rock bands with his friends during his high school years. He studied composition and graduated from Boston University where his professors included David Del Tredici. He earned his master's degree at Juilliard School.

== Career ==
Early in his career, Mercurio served as an associate or assistant conductor with the Brooklyn Philharmonic and Metropolitan Opera. In 1991, he was appointed principal conductor of the Opera Company of Philadelphia. He then served as music director of the Spoleto Festival for five years, where his work included conducting the United States premiere of Zemlinsky's Der Zwerg. In March 2019, the Czech National Symphony Orchestra announced the appointment of Mercurio as its next chief conductor, effective with the 2019-2020 season.

Mercurio has conducted a number of television productions, including:

- “Christmas in Vienna” series with the Vienna Symphony Orchestra
- “American Dream – Andrea Bocelli's Statue of Liberty Concert”
- The 20th Anniversary Richard Tucker Opera Gala
- RAI (Italian) television broadcasts of 'Christmas from Assisi' (2009, 2010, 2011)

Mercurio has recorded commercially for such labels as Sony Classical and Decca. He has been a regular collaborator with Andrea Bocelli.

== Recordings (selected list) ==
- "Concerto de Toronto", John Williams (Guitar), London Sinfonietta
- "Voices of Light", Anonymous 4, Netherlands Radio Choir, Netherlands Radio Philharmonic (Sony, 1995)
- "corea.concerto", London Philharmonic Orchestra (Sony, 1999)
- "Fanfare for the Volunteer", Mark O’Connor (Violin), London Philharmonic (Sony, 1999)
- "Listen to the Storyteller", Orchestra Of St. Luke's (Sony, 1999)
- "Soprano Songs and Arias", Ana Maria Martinez (Soprano), Prague Philharmonia (Naxos, 2000)
- "Tenor Arias", Marcello Giordani (Tenor), Orchestra and Chorus of the Bellini Theatre Catania (Naxos, 2004)
- "Many Voices", Prague Philharmonia (Sony, 2005)
- "Amore", Joseph Calleja (Tenor), BBC Concert Orchestra (Decca, 2013)

== Compositions ==
For orchestra

- For Lost Loved Ones (1991)
- Mercurial Overture' (1999)

For voice and Orchestra

- 'A White Rose' (text by John Boyle O'Reilly, for soprano and orchestra; 1988)
- Daydream for a Sentimental Baritone (for baritone and orchestra; 1988)
- 'Desiderio' (text by Andrea Bocelli, for tenor and orchestra; 1998)
- 'Paternita' (text by Andrea Bocelli, for tenor and orchestra; 1998)
- 'Song in Chaos' (text by Eugene O'Neill, for soprano and orchestra; 1988)
- Serenade for Tenor and Orchestra (text by William Hoffman; 1990) 1982
- A Grateful Tail - A Symphony in Four Movements for Orchestra, Vocalist and Gospel Choir (2013)

Chamber music

- Paranomasia (for clarinet, violin, cello, and piano; 2015)

Cultural offices
Preceded by Libor Pešek	Chief Conductor, Czech National Symphony Orchestra; 2019–	Succeeded by incumbent
