= Býchory =

- Municipality
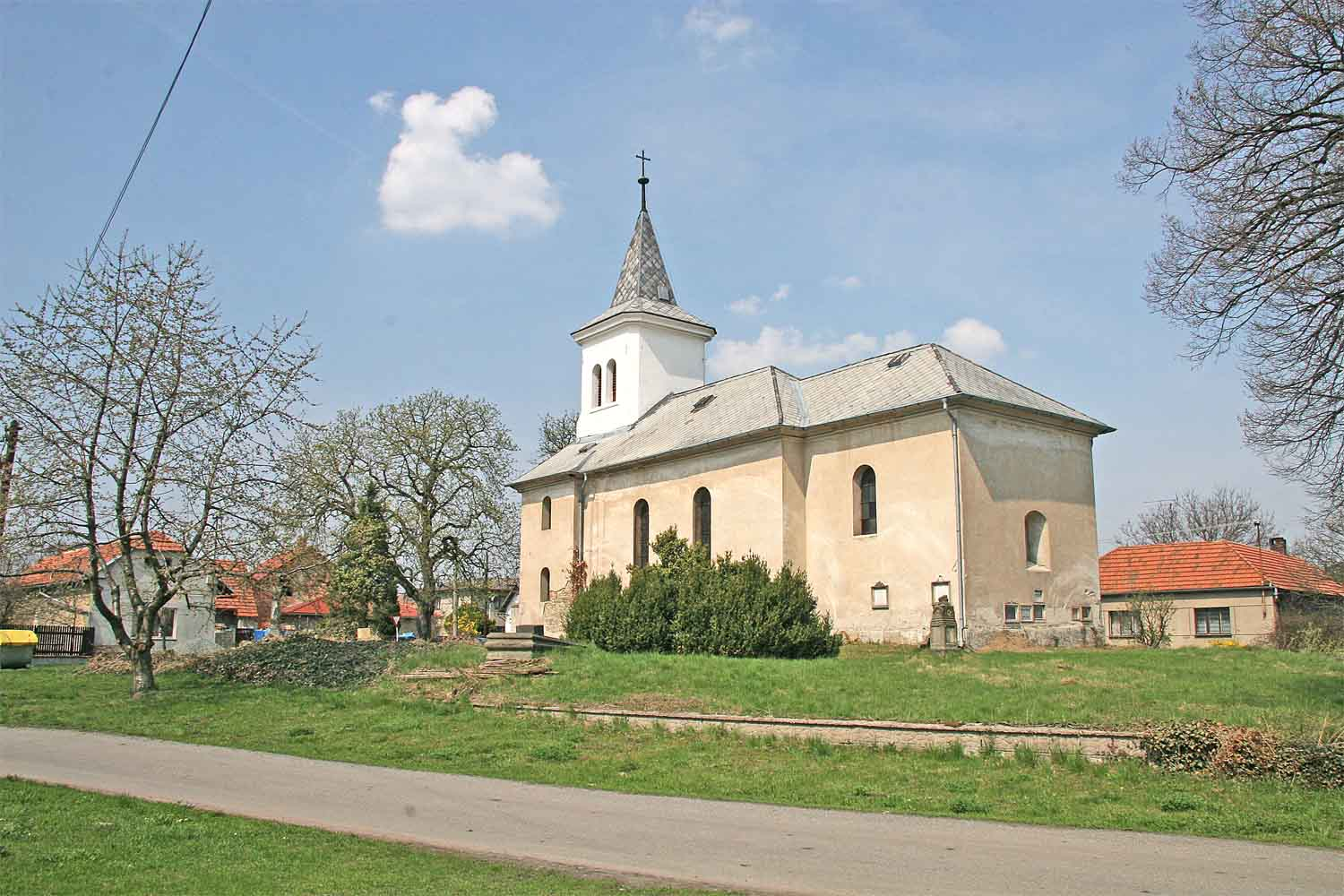
- Church of Saint Bartholomew

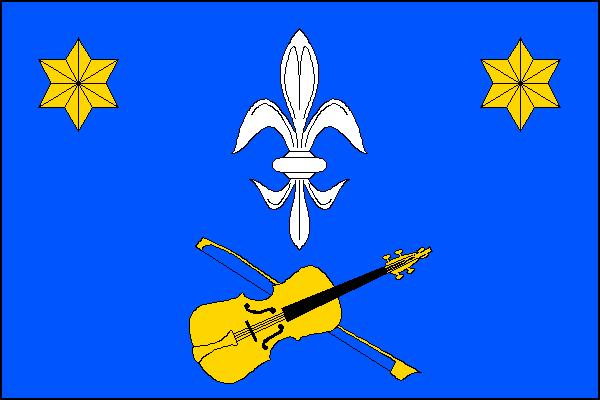
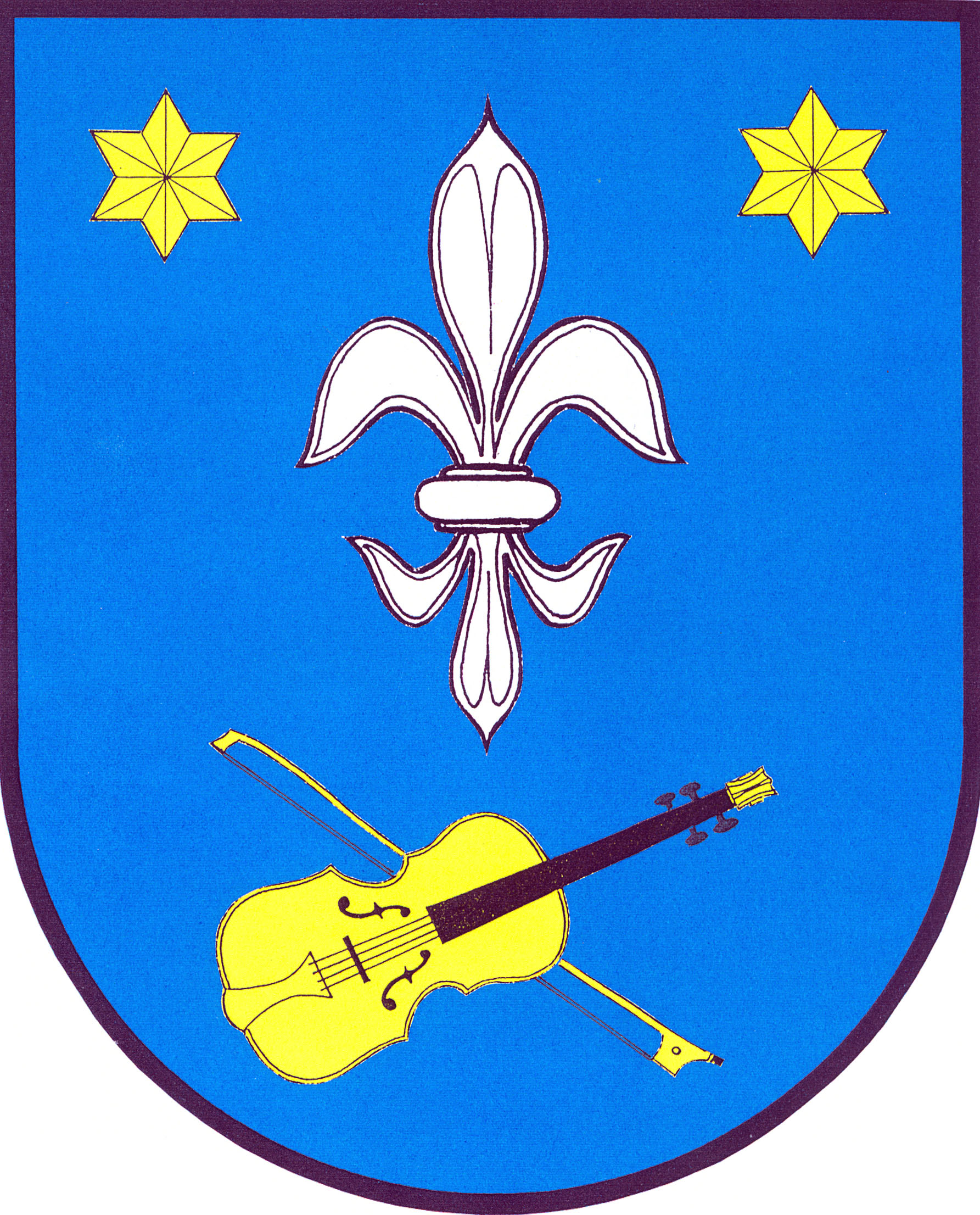
- Flag Coat of arms

- Location in the Czech Republic
- Coordinates: 50°4′4″N 15°16′25″E
- Country: Czech Republic
- Region: Central Bohemian
- District: Kolín
- First mentioned: 1352

Area
  - Total: 6.52 km^{2} (2.52 sq mi)
- Elevation: 214 m (702 ft)

Population (2026-01-01)
  - Total: 699
  - Density: 107/km^{2} (278/sq mi)
- Time zone: UTC+1 (CET)
  - Summer (DST): UTC+2 (CEST)
- Postal code: 280 02
- Website: www.obec-bychory.cz

Býchory is a municipality and village in Kolín District in the Central Bohemian Region of the Czech Republic. It has about 700 inhabitants.

== Etymology ==
The origin of the name is uncertain. There is a theory that it was derived from the personal name Bychor.

== Geography ==
Býchory is located about 6 kilometres (4 mi) northeast of Kolín and 53 km (33 mi) east of Prague. The western part of the municipality with the village lies in the Central Elbe Table. The eastern part lies in the East Elbe Table. The highest point is the hill Homole at 279 m (915 ft) above sea level. The stream Hluboký potok originates here and flows across the municipality.

== History ==
The first written mention of Býchory is from 1352, when the church was documented.

== Demographics ==
Historical population

| Year | Pop. | ±% |
|---|---|---|
| 1869 | 539 | — |
| 1880 | 629 | +16.7% |
| 1890 | 568 | −9.7% |
| 1900 | 642 | +13.0% |
| 1910 | 645 | +0.5% |

| Year | Pop. | ±% |
|---|---|---|
| 1921 | 635 | −1.6% |
| 1930 | 550 | −13.4% |
| 1950 | 519 | −5.6% |
| 1961 | 524 | +1.0% |
| 1970 | 540 | +3.1% |

| Year | Pop. | ±% |
|---|---|---|
| 1980 | 531 | −1.7% |
| 1991 | 506 | −4.7% |
| 2001 | 503 | −0.6% |
| 2011 | 600 | +19.3% |
| 2021 | 645 | +7.5% |

Source: Censuses

== Transport ==
There are no railways or major roads passing through the municipality.

== Sights ==
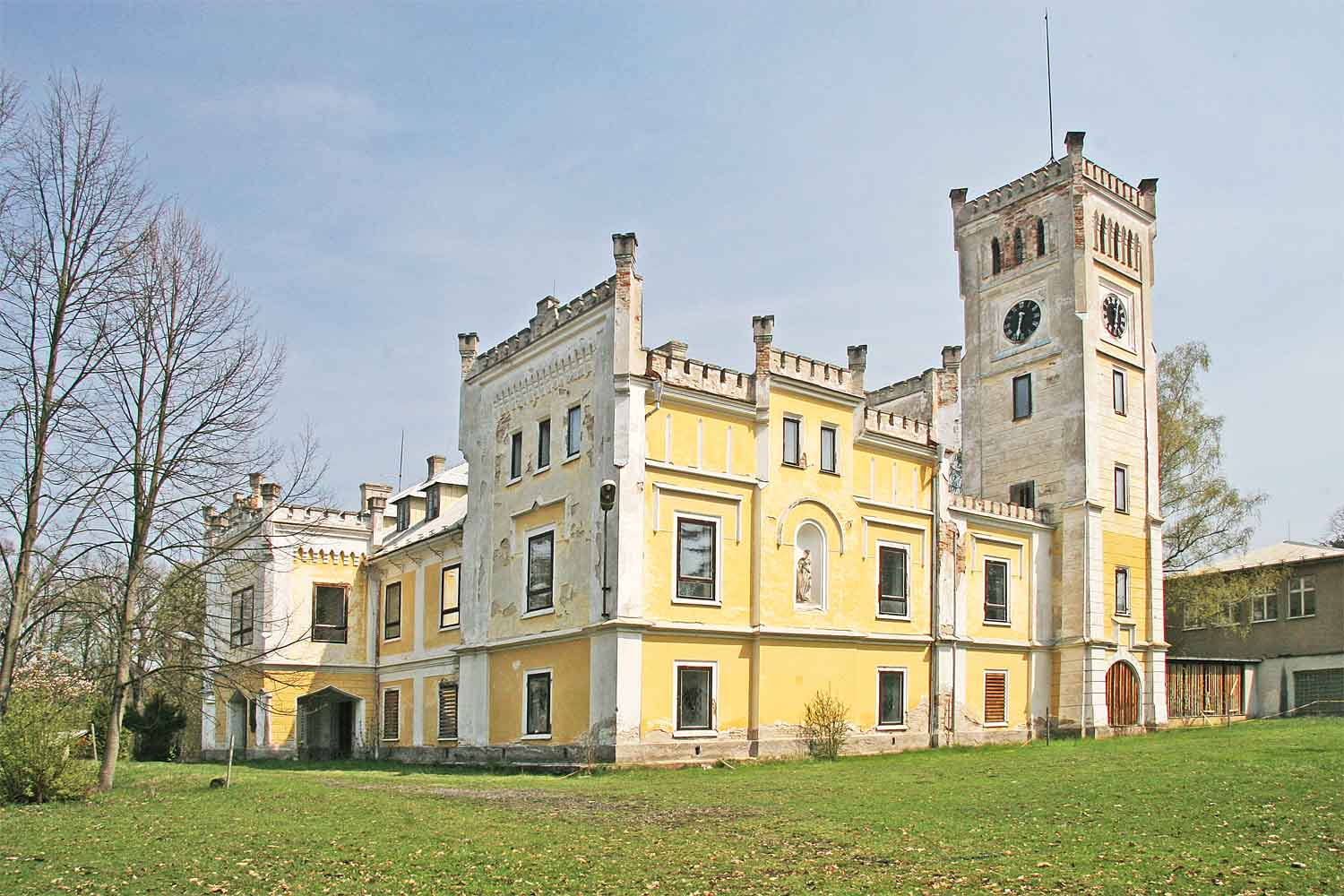
Býchory Castle

Býchory Castle (also called Horskýsfeld) is a manor house, built in the Tudor neo-Gothic style in 1865. It was owned by Jan Kubelík in 1904–1916.

The Church of Saint Bartholomew is a building with a Gothic core. It was rebuilt in the Baroque style in 1854–1855.

== Notable people ==
- Jan Kubelík (1880–1940), violinist and composer; lived here
- Rafael Kubelík (1914–1996), Czech-Swiss conductor and composer
