= Milan Sachs =

Czech-Croatian opera conductor and composer

- Born: 28 November 1884; Lišov, Bohemia, Austria-Hungary
- Died: 4 August 1968 (aged 83); Zagreb, Croatia, SFR Yugoslavia
- Occupations: Opera conductor, composer

Milan Sachs (28 November 1884 – 4 August 1968) was a Czech-Croatian opera conductor and composer, who was long associated with the Zagreb Opera in Croatia, where he conducted some important local premieres, including Wagner's Parsifal, and Janáček's Jenůfa (1920).

He also conducted the standard symphonic repertoire in the concert hall. In 1936, in Brno, Czechoslovakia, he conducted the world premiere of Dvořák's Symphony No. 1, The Bells of Zlonice (this was 61 years after it was written and 32 years after the composer's death).

== Biography ==
Sachs was born in Lišov in Bohemia to a Jewish family. He studied the violin at the Prague Conservatory, graduating in 1905, when he joined the Czech Philharmonic. From 1907 to 1910 he was concertmaster of a theatre orchestra in Belgrade, Kingdom of Serbia, and from 1910 to 1911 a music teacher in Novi Sad. In 1911 he began to conduct opera in Zagreb, Croatia (then part of Austria-Hungary; later part of Yugoslavia). He conducted the first production of Janáček's Jenůfa in Zagreb in 1920.

He was appointed Director of Opera at the National Theatre in Brno, Czechoslovakia in 1932, remaining there until 1938. In 1933 in Brno he conducted the world premiere of the ballet Svatba, set to Stravinsky's Les noces, choreography by Máša Cvejicová.

That same year 1933 saw Sachs conduct the first performance in Brno of Káťa Kabanová since the 1928 death of its composer Janáček. It is clear from the markings on the scores held there that Sachs dispensed with the practice of linking scenes in the opera by way of extended interludes.

On 4 October 1936, in Brno, Sachs conducted the world premiere of Dvořák's Symphony No. 1 in C minor, The Bells of Zlonice. The work was written in 1865, but for almost 60 years had been believed lost, until it came to light in 1923. Dvořák himself had died in 1904, having never heard his first symphony performed. Sachs was said to have "tactfully … made [a] few essential emendations and abbreviations" to the score.

In the 1930s, he was considered the most important member of the Jewish community involved in music in Zagreb. He conducted the first performance of Wagner's Parsifal in Zagreb.

During World War II, as a Jew, Sachs converted to Catholicism in an attempt to save himself from persecution by the Independent State of Croatia regime. For a time he was sheltered at the ward of ophthalmologist Dr. Vilko Panac in the Sisters of Charity Hospital Zagreb. Later Dido Kvaternik intervened to help save Sachs and his wife from persecution.

He was President of the Croatian Society of Music Artists 1945–48, and he was instrumental in the development of the Zagreb Opera after World War II. He was also known for his work in the concert hall, particularly in the symphonies of Beethoven, and Smetana's symphonic poem cycle Má vlast. He made a number of recordings, including Ivan Zajc's opera Nikola Šubić Zrinski.

He died in Zagreb in 1968, aged 83. His own works are mainly forgotten, but his Pastorale and Dance is still in the repertoire. In Sachs' honour, a street and a kindergarten in Zagreb are named after him.

== Bibliography ==
- Snješka Knežević, Aleksander Laslo (2011). Židovski Zagreb. Zagreb: AGM, Židovska općina Zagreb. ISBN 978-953-174-393-8.
- Goldstein, Ivo (2005). Židovi u Zagrebu 1918 - 1941. Zagreb: Novi Liber. ISBN 953-6045-23-0.
- Kraus, Ognjen (1998). Dva stoljeća povijesti i kulture Židova u Zagrebu i Hrvatskoj. Zagreb: Židovska općina Zagreb. ISBN 953-96836-2-9.
- Goldstein, Ivo (2001). Holokaust u Zagrebu. Zagreb: Novi Liber. ISBN 953-6045-19-2.
