= Hans Richter-Haaser =

German musician (1912–1980)

Hans Richter-Haaser (6 January 1912 – 13 December 1980) was a noted German classical pianist, who was known for his interpretations of Beethoven, Schubert and Schumann. He was also a teacher, a conductor, and a composer.

Hans Richter-Haaser was born in Dresden in 1912, and studied at the Dresden Conservatory. He made his debut in 1928, aged 16. During World War II, while fighting for the German army with an anti-aircraft unit, he had no opportunity to play for years on end, and his technique slipped. However, he regained it after the war. He conducted the Detmold Orchestra from 1945 to 1947. He was Professor of Piano at the North-West German Music Academy from 1947 to 1962. He then made a number of international tours, including to the United Kingdom, North and South America, and Australia. His American debut in 1959 was hailed as "one of the biggest keyboard talents to hit Manhattan in years". He appeared at the Salzburg Festival in 1963.

He played under over 200 conductors, including John Barbirolli, Ferenc Fricsay, Eugen Jochum, Rudolf Kempe, Wolfgang Sawallisch, Joseph Keilberth, Herbert von Karajan, Carlo Maria Giulini, István Kertész, Karl Böhm, Kurt Sanderling and Erich Leinsdorf.

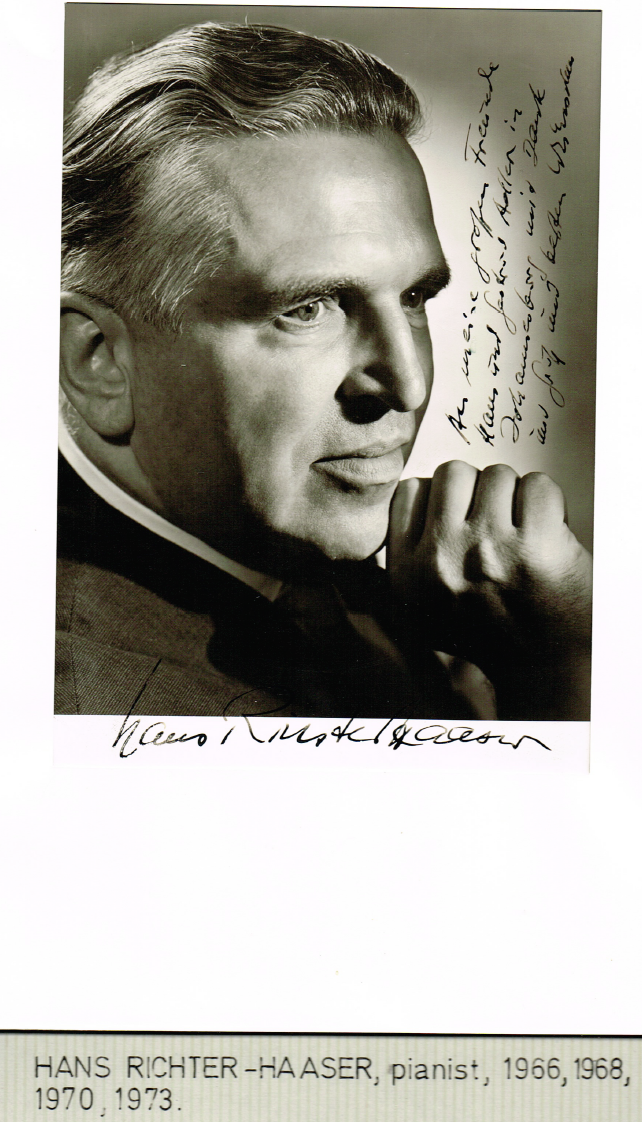
Hans Richter-Haaser 1966, photo dedicated on first of four acclaimed Southern Africa musical tours organised by Hans Adler

Hans Richter-Haaser composed a symphony, piano concertos and other works.

He died in Braunschweig in 1980, aged 68.

== Discography ==
Hans Richter-Haaser's recordings include:

- Ludwig van Beethoven, Diabelli Variations, Op. 120 (1964, Seraphim)
- Beethoven, Piano Concertos Nos. 3, 4 & 5, with the Philharmonia Orchestra under Carlo Maria Giulini (No. 3) and István Kertész (Nos. 4 & 5) (1963/60, EMI)
- Beethoven, Choral Fantasy, with the Vienna Symphony Orchestra under Karl Böhm (1956, Philips)
- Beethoven, Piano Sonatas Nos. 8, 14, 21, 23, 24, 28 (Philips)
- Beethoven, Piano Sonatas Nos. 1, 2, 3, 16, 17, 18, 22, 26, 27, 29, 30, 31 & 32, Diabelli Variations, Rondos Op. 51, Fantasy Op. 77 (1959–64, EMI)
- Brahms, Piano Concerto No. 1 and Beethoven, Piano Concerto No. 5, with the Danish Radio Symphony Orchestra under Kurt Sanderling (Kontrapunkt)
- Brahms, Piano Concerto No. 2, with the Berlin Philharmonic Orchestra under Herbert von Karajan (their only recording together) (1958, EMI)
- Grieg and Schumann, Piano Concertos, with the Vienna Symphony Orchestra under Rudolf Moralt (1958, Philips)
- Mozart, Piano Concertos Nos. 17 & 26, with the Philharmonia Orchestra under István Kertész (1961, EMI)
- Mozart, Piano Concerto No. 27, under Erich Leinsdorf
- with Ludwig Hoelscher, cello
  - Beethoven, Cello Sonatas, Op. 5
  - Pfitzner, Cello Sonata in F sharp minor, Op. 1
  - Frescobaldi, Toccata for cello and basso continuo
  - Dvořák, Adagio in D, Rondo in G minor
  - Hindemith, Cello Sonata, Op. 11, No. 3
  - Mendelssohn, Cello Sonata No. 2 in D, Op. 58.
- with Henryk Szeryng, violin
  - Violin sonatas by Beethoven, Brahms and Mozart.
