= Arthur Judson =

American artist manager and the founder of CBS

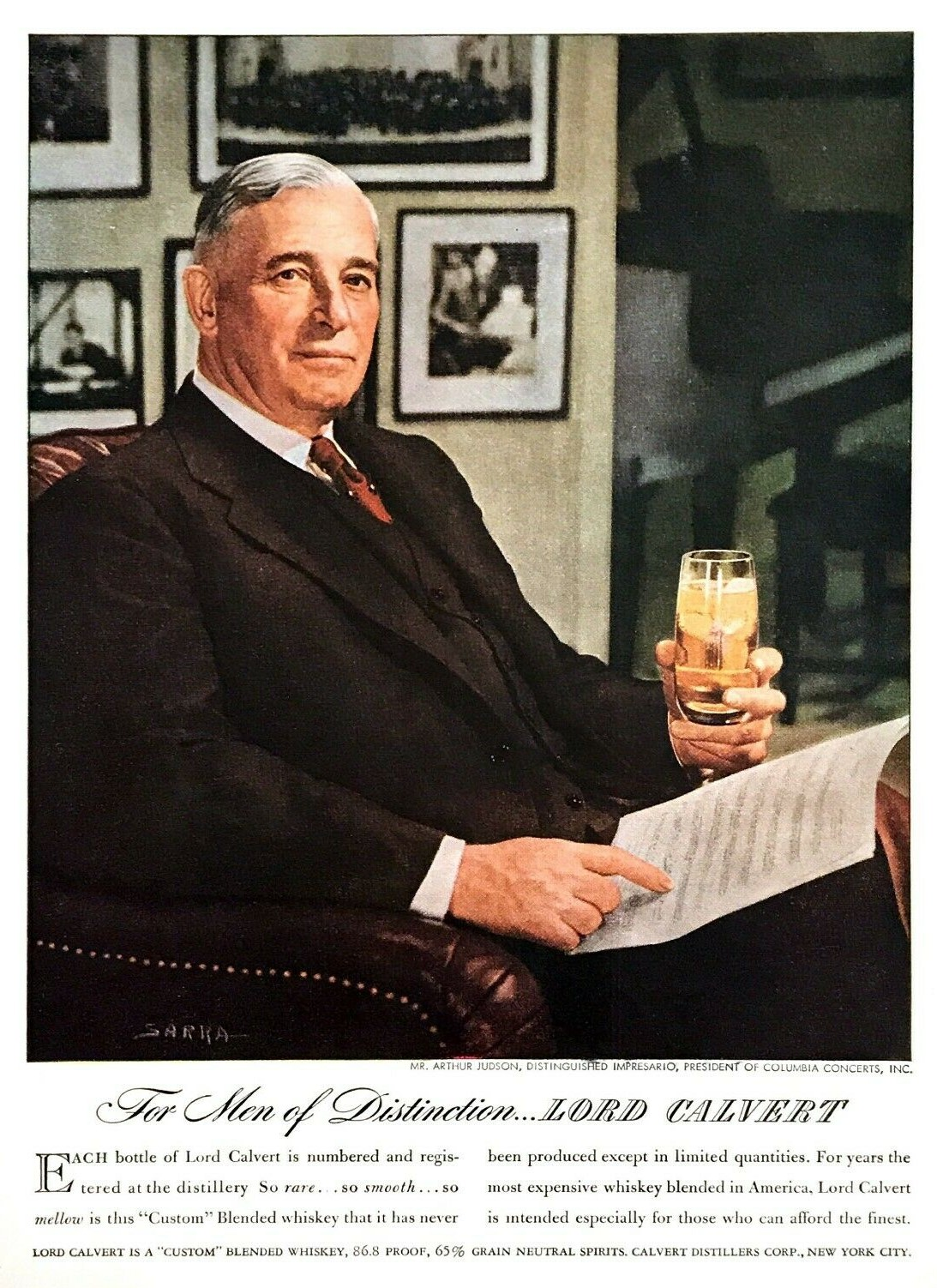
- Portrait of Judson by Valentino Sarra (1946)
- Born: Arthur Leon Judson; February 17, 1881; Dayton, Ohio, US
- Died: January 28, 1975 (aged 93); Rye, New York, US
- Resting place: Gate of Heaven Cemetery
- Occupations: Artists' manager; founder of CBS

Arthur Leon Judson (February 17, 1881 – January 28, 1975) was an artists' manager who also managed the New York Philharmonic and Philadelphia Orchestra and was also the founder of CBS. He co-founded the Handel Society of New York with entrepreneur James Grayson in 1966.

== Early life ==
Judson studied violin beginning at the age of eight, and continued his studies for one year as a teenager with the composer, conductor, violinist Max Bendix, and the violinist Leopold Lichtenberg in New York. At the age of nineteen, he became the dean of the music department at Denison University, Granville, Ohio, from 1900 to 1907. In 1903 at Denison, he performed the Richard Strauss Violin Sonata in what he called the first public performance in the United States. He returned to New York in 1907 to attempt a recital career. He also spent eight years on the staff of Musical America magazine, serving as advertising manager and critic. Disillusioned of a concert career (he said of this time "I was a good violinist, but no Kreisler or Heifetz"), Judson was pleased to be offered a lucrative management career. He was an Episcopalian.

== Orchestra manager and artists' manager ==
A benefit of Judson's Musical America job was traveling to hear concerts and meeting the people who performed or attended the concerts. Judson was therefore already known for his knowledge of music and judgment on musicians of quality when he was appointed as the manager of the Philadelphia Orchestra in July 1915. Within months, he launched Concert Management Arthur Judson, Inc. in Philadelphia to manage artists, and commuted daily to his New York office where he set up a second artists’ management office. With three partners, he organized the Judson Radio Program as another venue for his artists in 1926. His attempt to get an exclusive contract with David Sarnoff at the National Broadcasting Company for the radio program failed. Judson and his partners therefore purchased a low-power station owned by the Atlantic Broadcasting Company and by January 27, 1927, signed up a network of sixteen stations known as the United Independent Broadcasters to carry his program. William S. Paley purchased this network on September 25, 1928, and it became the Columbia Broadcasting System (CBS), with Judson as the second largest stockholder.

In 1930, Judson became the president of Columbia Concerts Corporation (which is now Columbia Artists Management). William S. Paley was chairman of the board. Judson amalgamated seven independent concert bureaus in what would become known as the "Judson Empire". These were the Wolfsohn Music Bureau, Haensel and Jones, The Metropolitan Musical Bureau, Evans and Salter, and the Community Concert Service of Ward French. Also included in this amalgamation was Concert Management Arthur Judson. The new company managed 125 artists and organizations, approximately two-thirds of the top musicians in America.

Judson managed the Philadelphia Orchestra from 1915 to 1935 and the New York Philharmonic from 1922 to 1956.

Judson's zenith was reached between 1930 and 1935 when he simultaneously managed the New York Philharmonic, Philadelphia Orchestra, instituted and managed the summer New York Stadium concert series at Lewisohn Stadium 1920–1943 in New York and the summer Robin Hood Dell concerts in Philadelphia 1930–1935 as well as serving as president of Columbia Concerts Corporation. He also was the advisory manager of the Cincinnati Symphony Orchestra for five years (1924–1928). As an impresario, he advised many other organizations. When Theodore Spiering, conductor of the Oregon Symphony, suddenly died in 1925 the orchestra called Judson. His recommendation, Willem van Hoogstraten, was hired. When the Minneapolis Symphony (now the Minnesota Orchestra) needed a conductor in 1931, Judson recommended Eugene Ormandy. Judson also recommended the successors to Ormandy in Minneapolis: Dimitri Mitropoulos and Antal Doráti. Some likened the Minneapolis orchestra to Judson's "farm team".

Judson was not only big in the music world, he was also a physically big man described as six foot four, 200 pounds, possessing a massive head, barrel chest, and also huge hands useful for his favorite pastime of chopping wood. He had a ruddy complexion which he explained as a "permanent rage" induced by dealing with artists. He was impeccably groomed and worked standing at a high antique desk while he smoked cigars. He was surrounded by steel engravings, shelves of books, antique furnishings, and old pewter. He was always available to walk across the street to Carnegie Hall to listen to an audition. He was extremely choosy when it came to pianists and violinists, accepting very few. He considered himself a "disappointed conductor" but made up for this by conducting the 100-piece summer orchestra at Ocean Grove, New Jersey, beginning in 1898.

The Community Artists series made it possible for communities to obtain high-quality artists without having to assume high financial risks since the concerts were prepaid. Artists had more opportunities too, but in return they paid a 20 percent commission to Judson's Columbia Concerts Corporation and another 20 percent to Community Artists. Many artists believed they were being exploited and not promoted. The only other company in this field, NBC Artists Service (which opened in 1928), shared the market and did not compete with Judson.

In 1939 Judson was called before the Federal Communications Commission to testify. This was described in a highly unflattering Time magazine article on February 6, 1939, titled "Chain-Store Music". Readers were surprised to learn that music was organized just like any other business. Salesmen toured the country selling musicians to 376 communities involved in the Community Artists series. In order to get the big-name artists, lesser known commodities also had to be purchased. There was plenty to choose from in the catalog: Columbia Concerts Corporation controlled two-thirds of the nation's musical artists and conductors. Impending government investigations into the concert management monopoly caused William S. Paley to resign as chairman of the board and sell his interests to Judson in 1941. CBS and NBC also sold their agencies to their directors to avoid monopoly investigations. Judson renamed the company Columbia Artists Management. NBC became the National Concert Artists Corporation.

There were some musicians Judson did not represent. One was the conductor Artur Rodziński. Judson attempted to stop Rodzinski from taking over the Cleveland Orchestra in 1933 (an attempt that failed). Judson succeeded in stopping Rodzinski from taking over the New York Philharmonic in 1936. In 1947, Rodzinski who had finally become the conductor of the New York Philharmonic with Judson's short-term assistance battled with Judson over hiring and programming. Addressing the board, he called Judson (who was present) "a dictator who made musical progress impossible". Rodzinski requested that the orchestra board then choose between himself and Judson The board sided with Judson. Rodzinski also lost his next job as conductor of the Chicago Symphony Orchestra over programming disputes, purportedly due to the influence of Judson.

Two other conductors who believed Judson damaged their careers were Eugene Aynsley Goossens and Otto Klemperer. Goossens decided, after twelve years, he no longer needed to pay Judson a commission. Judson forced him to pay in an out-of-court settlement, and then dumped him. Klemperer, engaged by Judson for the first fourteen weeks of the New York Philharmonic's 1935–1936 season made the "mistake" of programming Gustav Mahler's Symphony No. 2 over Judson's objections. Judson thereafter abandoned Klemperer.

Strained relations with a major conductor and the impropriety and conflict of interest in managing artists and orchestras which then hired the same artists caused Judson to resign his orchestra management positions. He announced his resignation as Philadelphia's manager on October 8, 1934 (which became effective May 31, 1935). The cause was increasingly strained relations with its conductor Leopold Stokowski. Although the two collaborated in later years, Stokowski said at the time "Mr. Judson is not my manager". New York Times's music critic Howard Taubman's article "The New York Philharmonic—What's Wrong and Why?" appeared on April 29, 1956. Taubman alleged over-hiring of Columbia artists at the New York Philharmonic and may have encouraged the seventy-five-year-old Judson to resign from that post.

In 1948, Margaret Truman's agent, James A. Davidson, listened to her complaints about getting few bookings. She learned from Davidson that concerts in the U.S. were largely controlled by Columbia and the National Concert Artists Corporation. Margaret told her father what she had heard, and the president requested the Federal Bureau of Investigation investigate. In October 1955, the United States Department of Justice filed suit in the United States District Court for the Southern District of New York. Columbia along with three other defendants were charged with restraint of interstate trade and commerce in the booking of artists, and also with monopolizing organized audience associations. The agencies pleaded no contest and were forced to release their monopoly position. By this time, Arthur Judson had been replaced at Columbia by Ward French.

Amongst the artists Judson presented and represented: Ruth St. Denis, Marian Anderson, John Barbirolli, Robert Casadesus, Van Cliburn, Clifford Curzon, Todd Duncan, Nelson Eddy, Benjamino Gigli, Mischa Elman, Zino Francescatti, Gary Graffman, Jascha Heifetz, Vladimir Horowitz, Jose Iturbi, Lorin Maazel, Yehudi Menuhin, Eugene Ormandy, Lily Pons, Fritz Reiner, Jesús Maria Sanromá, Rudolf Serkin, the American Opera Company, and Helen Traubel.

Awards included being elected an officer in the French Academy, 1920; an honorary doctorate in music from Denison University, 1931, and the Order of the Academie des Beaux Arts, 1941. Judson Hall at 165 West 57th Street in New York City was named after him from 1960 to 1964, when Judson left Columbia.

He died on January 28, 1975.
