= Edith Kertész-Gabry =

Hungarian soprano

Edith Kertész-Gabry (18 July 1927 – 10 February 2012) was a Hungarian soprano and professor of opera at the Cologne University of Music.

== Early years and education ==
Edith Kertész-Gabry, born Edit Gáncs in Budapest, Hungary, studied at the Franz Liszt Academy of Music, and made her debut in 1951 at the Budapest National Opera. That same year, she married the conductor, István Kertész. After the Hungarian Revolution of 1956, Kertész-Gabry left Hungary and moved to Germany with her husband and young son.

== Career ==
In 1956, Kertész-Gabry launched a successful operatic career when she won the prestigious Deutsches Schumann-Komitee Prize. Shortly thereafter, she received an appointment to the Bremen Opera from where she moved on to Cologne in 1960. On 15 February 1965 she distinguished herself as a dramatic coloratura soprano in the lead role of Marie in the premiere of Bernd Alois Zimmermann's opera, Die Soldaten. In 1963, WDR (Westdeutscher Rundfunk) first broadcast scenes from Die Soldaten, but not the full opera. Zimmermann had only completed revisions to the score one year later. Today, Zimmermann's four-act opera, commissioned by the Cologne Opera, is considered one of the most important and influential operas written in Germany since the second world war." In 1974, Kertész-Gabry performed this role once again in Zimmermann's shortened concertante version of his opera, Vokalsinfonie.

Kertész-Gabry gave guest performances at various opera houses and festivals throughout Germany and abroad. During the earliest years of her singing career, she quickly expanded her repertoire to include Konstanze in the Die Entführung aus dem Serail, Susanna in The Marriage of Figaro, Fiordiligi in Così fan tutte, Pamina in The Magic Flute, Zerlina in Don Giovanni, Mrs. Fluth in Otto Nicolai's The Merry Wives of Windsor, the Baroness in Albert Lortzing's Der Wildschütz, Sophie in Der Rosenkavalier, Eva in Wagner's Die Meistersinger von Nürnberg, Desdemona in Verdi's Otello, Alice Ford in Verdi's Falstaff, Antonia in Jacques Offenbach's The Tales of Hoffmann, and Zerline in Daniel Auber's Fra Diavolo. At the 1967 Salzburg Festival she performed, Silvia in Mozart's, Ascanio in Alba. By then, her repertoire of operas from the 20th century also included, in addition to Marie in Die Soldaten, Cardillac's daughter in Paul Hindemith's Cardillac, and Luise in Hans Werner Henze's Der junge Lord.

Since 1971, in addition to performing regularly with the Cologne Opera, Kertész-Gabry taught at the Folkwang-Musikschule. Before 1977 she received a teaching appointment at the Cologne University of Music. In 1988, she performed one of her last notable performances at the Schwetzingen Festival. There she sang the role of Berta in Rossini's The Barber of Seville, which also featured Cecilia Bartoli (mezzo soprano) as Rosina, David Kuebler (tenor) as Count Almaviva, and Gino Quilico (baritone) as Figaro. In a review of the recording, Kertész-Gabry's performance proved of special note: "her intonation and characterisation is superb, and in the ensembles, she completely swamps young Miss Bartoli . . ."

== Death ==
After a prolonged illness, Kertész-Gabry died in Cologne on February 10, 2012. Kertész-Gabry had three children (Gabor, Peter, and Katharine) with her husband, the conductor István Kertész. She is survived by one child, five grandchildren, and four great-grandchildren.

== Discography ==
- Brogli-Sacher, Roman, Friedhelm Dohl Edition, Vol. 8, Dreyer Gaido, 2010.
- Handel, George Frideric, La resurrezione (Ewerhart) Münster Santini Chamber Choir and Orchestra (1961; reissue, 2005).
- Mahler, Gustav, Symphony No. 4 in G major (Kertész), Bamberg Symphony Orchestra (1968).
- Mozart, Wolfgang Amadeus, Mitridate, re di Ponto (Hager) Mozarteum Orchestra Salzburg (1970).
- Rossini, Gioachino, The Barber of Seville (Ferro) Stuttgart Radio Symphony Orchestra (1993) BMG Ariola.
- Verdi, Giuseppe, Otello (Kertész), Augsburg Philharmonic (1962) OPERA EPK 1220.
- Zimmermann, Bernd Alois, Die Soldaten (Gielen), Gürzenich Orchestra (1965; 2008 reissue), Wergo 66982.
- Zimmermann, Bernd Alois, Vokalsinfonie aus Die Soldaten für sechs Gesangssolisten und Orchester (Wakasugi) WDR Symphony Orchestra Cologne (1974), HARMONA MUNDI.
