= James Grayson (music industry executive) =

James Grayson (1897–1980) was an English music industry executive and music impresario active in the United States. With Henry Gage and Michael Naida he co-founded the classical music record label Westminster Records (WR) in 1949. It was one of the earliest LP labels and played a significant role in the Early music revival of the mid 20th century by adding significantly to recordings of Baroque music. In 1966 Grayson co-founded the Handel Society of New York, an organization dedicated to performing operas and oratorios by George Frideric Handel, with Arthur Judson.

Grayson was the head of WR's Artists and repertoire (A&R) division. High Fidelity magazine described him as the "godfather to the Barenboim career"; having shepherded Daniel Barenboim's recordings for a fourteen-year period at the onset of his career. Music critic Irving Kolodin stated "Grayson became the founding father of Westminster Records, and foster-father of such young, talented people as guitarists Julian Bream and John Williams, pianists Jörg Demus and Paul Badura-Skoda (as well as Barenboim), and the Amadeus Quartet. He found them, loved them, and lost them, when their reputations were made, to larger companies with bigger bank accounts." Grayson was also head of A&R at Command Records.
