= Westminster Records =

- Parent company: ABC Records
- Founded: 1949
- Founder: Mischa Naida; James Grayson; Henry Swoboda; Henry Gage
- Defunct: 1965
- Status: Inactive
- Genre: Classical
- Country of origin: United States

Westminster Records was an American classical music record label, issuing original recordings until 1965. It was co–founded in 1949 by Mischa Naida (who later founded Musical Heritage Society), the owner of the Westminster Record Shop in New York City, businessman James Grayson (1897–1980), conductor Henry Swoboda, and Henry Gage. Its trademark was Big Ben and its slogan was "natural balance", referring to its single microphone technique.

Early on, Westminster recordings were technically superior to most others available, and the label became popular among the growing community of audiophiles. In the late 1950s, the company began issuing stereophonic recordings, including a rare disc of the music of Swedish composer Hugo Alfvén (1872–1960), conducted by the composer. The "Westminster Laboratory" (W-Lab) series of classical recordings were technically superior to other brands and sold at higher price than the regular Westminster issues.

The company was sold in the early 1960s to ABC-Paramount, which at first continued to issue new material (as well as reissuing old recordings on the "Westminster Gold" label). Westminster ceased issuing new (original) recordings in 1965. Beginning in 1970, ABC's "Westminster Gold" reissues, including a new "Best Of" composers series, sported new eye-catching sleeve designs that used whimsy and humor to garner lucrative sales from high school and college-age classical music aficionados.

MCA Records acquired the Westminster catalog when it purchased ABC Records in 1979. While continuing to distribute ABC's catalogue of classical music LPs, MCA hired former ABC classical department head John Sievers to establish its own MCA classical music department. The next year, MCA reissued much of the classical music back catalogues of Command, Decca, and ABC/Westminster Records on the "MCA Westminster" label.

The Westminster recordings, as well as the rest of the MCA classical music catalogue, are currently managed by Deutsche Grammophon.
