= Carnival Overture (Dvořák) =

1891 musical composition

Carnival Overture (10:56)
Performed in 2006 by U.S. Air Force Band, arranged by Leigh Steiger for wind band instead of Dvořák's orchestral scoring

The concert overture Carnival (Czech: Karneval, koncertní ouvertura), Op. 92, B. 169, was written by Antonín Dvořák in 1891. It is part of a "Nature, Life and Love" trilogy of overtures, forming the second part, "Life". The other two parts are In Nature's Realm, Op. 91 ("Nature") and Othello, Op. 93 ("Love").

The overture, in A major, is scored for two flutes, piccolo, two oboes, English horn, two clarinets, two bassoons, four horns, two trumpets, three trombones, tuba, timpani, triangle, cymbals, tambourine, harp and strings. Its duration is approximately ten minutes.

== Performance history ==
Notable performances of Dvořák's Carnival.

- Prague, Austria-Hungary: 28 April 1892, conducted by Dvořák himself, at Rudolfinum.
- Vienna, Austria-Hungary: 4 February 1895, conducted by Dvořák himself

== Discography ==
- the Hallé 150th anniversary, The Hallé, Hamilton Harty, recorded 30 April 1927, remastering BBC music CD (2007)
- Dvořák in Prague: A Celebration, Boston Symphony Orchestra, Seiji Ozawa, Sony CD (1994) and Kultur DVD (2007)
