= Zdeněk Košler =

Czech conductor

Zdeněk Košler (25 March 1928 – 2 July 1995) was a Czech conductor. He played an important role in Czechoslovak musical life of the second half of 20th century, notably during the 1960s and 1980s. He was particularly well known as an opera conductor.

== Life and work ==
Born in Prague, Czechoslovakia, Košler came from a musical family. His father was a member of the Prague National Theatre Orchestra, and his younger brother Miroslav was a choirmaster.

After finishing his studies at the gymnasium, he enrolled at the Academy of Performing Arts in Prague where he was a pupil of Karel Ančerl. In 1948, while still a student, he began to work as a répétiteur at the Prague's National Theatre. In that time he began also to gain some experience with the baton. In 1949 Košler joined the Olomouc Opera, where he conducted works by Leoš Janáček (The Makropulos Affair) and by W. A. Mozart (Così fan tutte, The Marriage of Figaro). In 1959 he won the International Young Conductors Competition in Besançon, France. In 1963 he won the respected Dimitri Mitropoulos Conducting Competition in New York City, together with Claudio Abbado, and the Argentinian Pedro Ignacio Calderón, after which he became assistant conductor to Leonard Bernstein at the New York Philharmonic for one year. From 1962 to 1964 Košler was appointed to the Opera Theatre in Ostrava. He worked also with foreign ensembles and opera houses, conducted Richard Strauss's opera Salome at the Vienna State Opera, and performed the complete cycle of Dvořák's symphonies with the Vienna Symphony. In the late sixties he also became the guest-conductor at the Komische Oper Berlin. Košler was hired as the second conductor of the Czech Philharmonic and became the principal conductor of the Bratislava Opera House in 1971. From 1980 to 1984 he also led the orchestra of the National Theatre in Prague. He retired in 1992.

Košler made many recordings, including a group of works by Mozart, Dvořák, and Tchaikovsky in Barking Town Hall with the London Philharmonic Orchestra. He also made concert tours to Austria, United States, and Canada. He toured most often to Japan, where he performed with various orchestras thirty times.

== Discography ==
Camille Saint-Saëns, Piano Concerto n° 2, Albert Roussel, Piano Concerto, Francis Poulenc, Concerto for 2 Pianos, Peter Toperczer, piano, Slovak Philharmonic, conductor Zdeněk Košler. CD Naxos 2000

Cultural offices
Preceded by none	Chief Conductor, Czech National Symphony Orchestra; 1993–1996	Succeeded by Paul Freeman
