= Paul Freeman (conductor) =

American conductor (1936–2015)

Paul Douglas Freeman (January 2, 1936 – July 21, 2015) was an American conductor, born in Richmond, Virginia.

== Career and education ==
Freeman was a conductor, composer, and founder of the Chicago Sinfonietta. Freeman earned bachelor, master, and doctoral degrees from the Eastman School of Music. A Fulbright Scholarship enabled him to study for two years at the Hochshule für Musik (University for Music) in Berlin, Germany with Ewald Lindemann. He later studied conducting with Pierre Monteux at the American Symphony Orchestra.

While pursuing graduate studies at Eastman, Freeman began his conducting career as the music director of the Opera Theatre of Rochester for six years. He then held posts as associate conductor of the Dallas Symphony Orchestra from 1968 to 1970 and Detroit Symphony Orchestra from 1970 to 1979. These were followed by a stint as principal guest conductor of the Helsinki Philharmonic. From 1979 to 1988, he served as music director of the Victoria Symphony in Canada. In 1987, he founded the Chicago Sinfonietta of which he remained the musical director until his retirement in 2011. Concurrently to his time with the Chicago Sinfonietta, he held the post of music director and chief conductor of the Czech National Symphony Orchestra in Prague since 1996. Following his retirement from the Chicago Sinfonietta in 2011, he was named emeritus music director of the orchestra.

== Archives ==
Paul Freeman's papers, known as the Paul Freeman Conductor Scores, Recordings, and Other Material collection, are held at the Center for Black Music Research at Columbia College Chicago. The collection spans the years of 1987-2009 and includes 58 boxes of scores, audio and video recordings, and a small amount of personal papers. A majority of the scores are annotated by Freeman. The recordings include non-commercial performances by the Chicago Sinfonietta and other orchestras conducted by Freeman.

Additional papers are held at the University of Victoria Special Collections and University Archives. The collection contains 6 boxes of audio recordings, video cassettes, and a small number of personal papers including yearbooks and photo prints. Freeman also donated a large number of scores, many of which are annotated. Related records, such as Victoria Symphony programs and published recordings with Freeman as conductor, are available through the UVic Libraries.

== Recordings ==
Paul Freeman can be considered one of the most successful recording conductors from the United States. He has a nine-LP series that follows the history of Black symphonic composers from 1750 to the time of recording. This series garnered a lot of attention on the Columbia Records label during the 1970s, and has since been re-released as a Sony Classical boxed set of ten CDs, published in 2019. Freeman also collaborated with pianist Derek Han to record all of the piano concertos of Mozart, Haydn and Beethoven. In his work with numerous orchestras, Freeman has been a part of over a dozen televised productions in North America and Europe. Also, Freeman has been nominated for two Emmy Awards.

== Death ==
Paul Freeman died on July 21, 2015, at the age of 79 in Victoria, British Columbia, due to recent health issues and some long-term "physical challenges". Both his wife Cornelia and son Douglas were at his side when he died, and they planned a private ceremony in Canada along with a public memorial service in Chicago in September 2015.

== See also ==
- Black conductors

Cultural offices
Preceded by Zdeněk Košler	Chief Conductor, Czech National Symphony Orchestra; 1996–2007	Succeeded by Libor Pešek
