= Czech National Symphony Orchestra =

Symphony orchestra in Prague, Czech Republic

- Orchestra
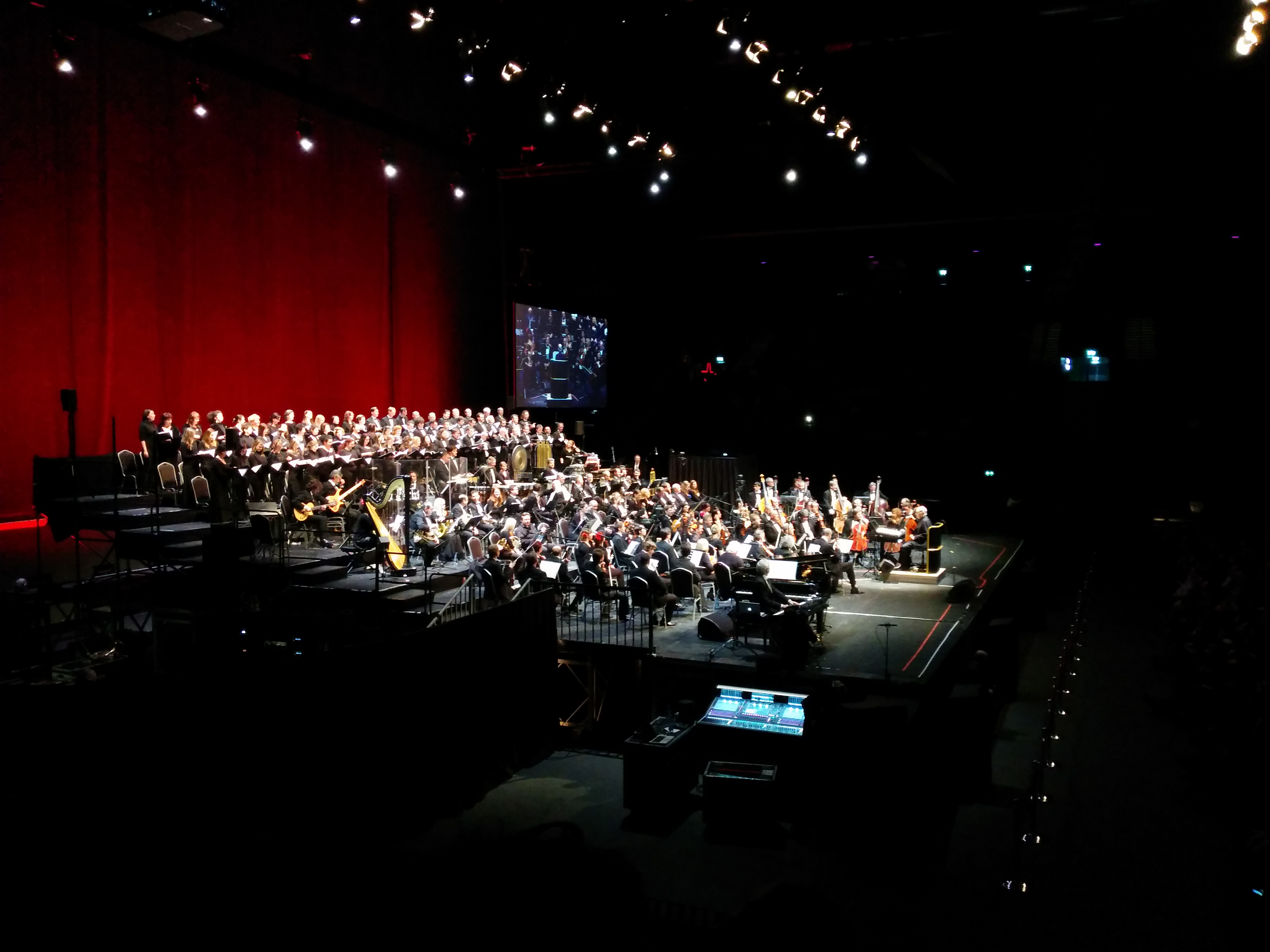
- Ennio Morricone conducting the Czech National Symphony Orchestra in Amsterdam in February 2016
- Native name: Český národní symfonický orchestr
- Founded: 1993
- Location: Prague, Czech Republic
- Concert hall: Municipal House, Smetana Hall
- Principal conductor: Steven Mercurio
- Website: https://www.cnso.cz/en

The Czech National Symphony Orchestra (ČNSO or CNSO; Czech: Český národní symfonický orchestr) is a Czech symphony orchestra based in Prague. The orchestra principally gives concerts at the Smetana Hall of the Municipal House and also performs at the Rudolfinum.

Founded in 1993 by trumpeter Jan Hasenöhrl and conductor Zdeněk Košler, the orchestra has developed activity in classical repertoire, film music, jazz, musicals, recording projects and international tours. Since 2005 it has organised the Prague Proms International Music Festival and served as its resident ensemble.

== History ==
The orchestra was founded in 1993 by Jan Hasenöhrl and Zdeněk Košler, with Košler as its first chief conductor. Košler worked with the ensemble during its first years, and in 1996 the American conductor Paul Freeman became chief conductor. Freeman led the orchestra for a decade, during which the ensemble expanded its recording and touring activity.

Libor Pešek became chief conductor in 2007. His period with the orchestra included subscription concerts, recordings and several tours of Great Britain. In 2019, following Pešek's departure, Steven Mercurio was appointed music director and principal conductor of the orchestra.

The orchestra is based at Studio No. 1, also known as "The Gallery", in Prague-Hostivař, which has been used for many of its recording projects.

== Film music, recordings and special projects ==
The orchestra has worked extensively in film music and recording projects. Conductors, composers and film figures associated with the orchestra or with recording work at the CNSO studio include Lalo Schifrin, Pino Donaggio, Giuliano Taviani, Danny Elfman, Hans Zimmer, James Newton Howard, Quentin Tarantino, Vince Mendoza, Giuseppe Tornatore, Carl Davis, Marcello Rota, Vladimir Cosma, Christian Lindberg and Chick Corea.

The CNSO had a long-running collaboration with Ennio Morricone, including recordings and European concert tours. The orchestra recorded music for Morricone's score to Quentin Tarantino's The Hateful Eight, which won the Academy Award, Golden Globe and BAFTA for original score. Morricone later recorded the album Morricone 60 with the orchestra for Decca Records.

On 20 August 2003, the orchestra performed at the first Symphonic Game Music Concert in Leipzig, Germany, an event recognised by Guinness World Records as the first live videogame concert outside Japan. The concert took place at the Gewandhaus and included music from games by composers such as Nobuo Uematsu, Richard Jacques, Alexandre Desplat, Jeremy Soule and Christopher Lennertz.

In 2022 the orchestra was associated with a Grammy Award for Vince Mendoza's "To the Edge of Longing" from the album Freedom Over Everything, recorded with the CNSO and featuring Julia Bullock. The project led to the 2023 Prague Proms concert "Vince Mendoza Grammy Night", with Mendoza conducting the orchestra.

The orchestra has also made long-term recordings for JVC Victor Entertainment, including dozens of CDs and DVDs, and has recorded commercial projects with artists including Plácido Domingo and Vittorio Grigolo.

== Prague Proms and international tours ==
Since 2005, the CNSO has organised the Prague Proms International Music Festival and has served as its resident orchestra. The festival programme has included classical concerts, jazz, film music, crossover projects and appearances by international guest artists.

The orchestra has toured widely in Europe and beyond. Its touring activity has included performances in the United States, Japan, Australia, South Korea, China, Dubai, Oman, Canada and Mexico. The orchestra returned to the United States in 2023, including an appearance at Carnegie Hall.

Special touring projects have included Disney Fantasia: Live in Concert, European tours with Ennio Morricone and James Newton Howard, a tour with La La Land in concert, and the Symphonic Cinema project in the United Kingdom.

== Collaborations with artists and conductors ==
The orchestra has collaborated with singers, instrumentalists, conductors and artists from classical music, jazz, film music and popular music. In classical and operatic repertoire, performers associated with the orchestra have included Andrea Bocelli, Rolando Villazón, José Carreras, Plácido Domingo, Jonas Kaufmann, Piotr Beczała, Angela Gheorghiu, Teodor Ilincăi, Rusanda Panfili, Zuzana Marková and Renaud Capuçon.

Conductors and composers who have worked with the orchestra include Steven Mercurio, David Giménez, Jochen Rieder, Nayden Todorov, Marcello Rota, Vince Mendoza, Ennio Morricone, James Newton Howard, Lalo Schifrin, Danny Elfman, Hans Zimmer and Vladimir Cosma.

In jazz and popular music, the orchestra's collaborators have included Sting, George Michael, Natalie Cole, Dianne Reeves, Angélique Kidjo, Denise Donatelli, Ute Lemper, James Morrison, Branford Marsalis, Wynton Marsalis, Bobby Shew, Joe Lovano, John Abercrombie, John Patitucci and Dave Weckl.

== Chief conductors ==
- Zdeněk Košler (1993–1995)
- Paul Freeman (1996–2006)
- Libor Pešek (2007–2019)
- Steven Mercurio (2019–present)
