= In Nature's Realm (Dvořák) =

External audio
- You may listen to In Nature's Realm interpreted by Barbara Shubert conducting the DuPage Symphony Orchestra in 2009 here on archive.org

The concert overture In Nature's Realm (Czech: V přírodě, koncertní ouvertura), Op. 91, B. 168, was written by Antonín Dvořák in 1891. It is the first part ("Nature") of a "Nature, Life and Love" trilogy of overtures written by Dvořák. The other two parts of the trilogy are the Carnival Overture, Op. 92 ("Life") and Othello, Op. 93 ("Love").

The overture is scored for two flutes, two oboes, English horn, two clarinets, bass clarinet, two bassoons, four horns, two trumpets, three trombones, tuba, timpani, triangle, cymbals, and strings.
