= Othello (Dvořák) =

1892 concert overture by Dvořák

The concert overture Othello (Czech: Othello, koncertní ouvertura), Op. 93, B. 174, was written by Antonín Dvořák in 1892 as the third part of a trilogy of overtures called "Nature, Life and Love". The first two parts of the trilogy are In Nature's Realm, Op. 91 ("Nature") and the Carnival Overture, Op. 92 ("Life").

The overture is scored for two flutes (Flute I doubling piccolo), two oboes, English horn, two clarinets in A, two bassoons, four horns, two trumpets, three trombones, tuba, timpani, bass drum, cymbals, harp and strings.
