= Symphony No. 5 (Dvořák) =

1875 symphony by Antonín Dvořák

- by Antonín Dvořák
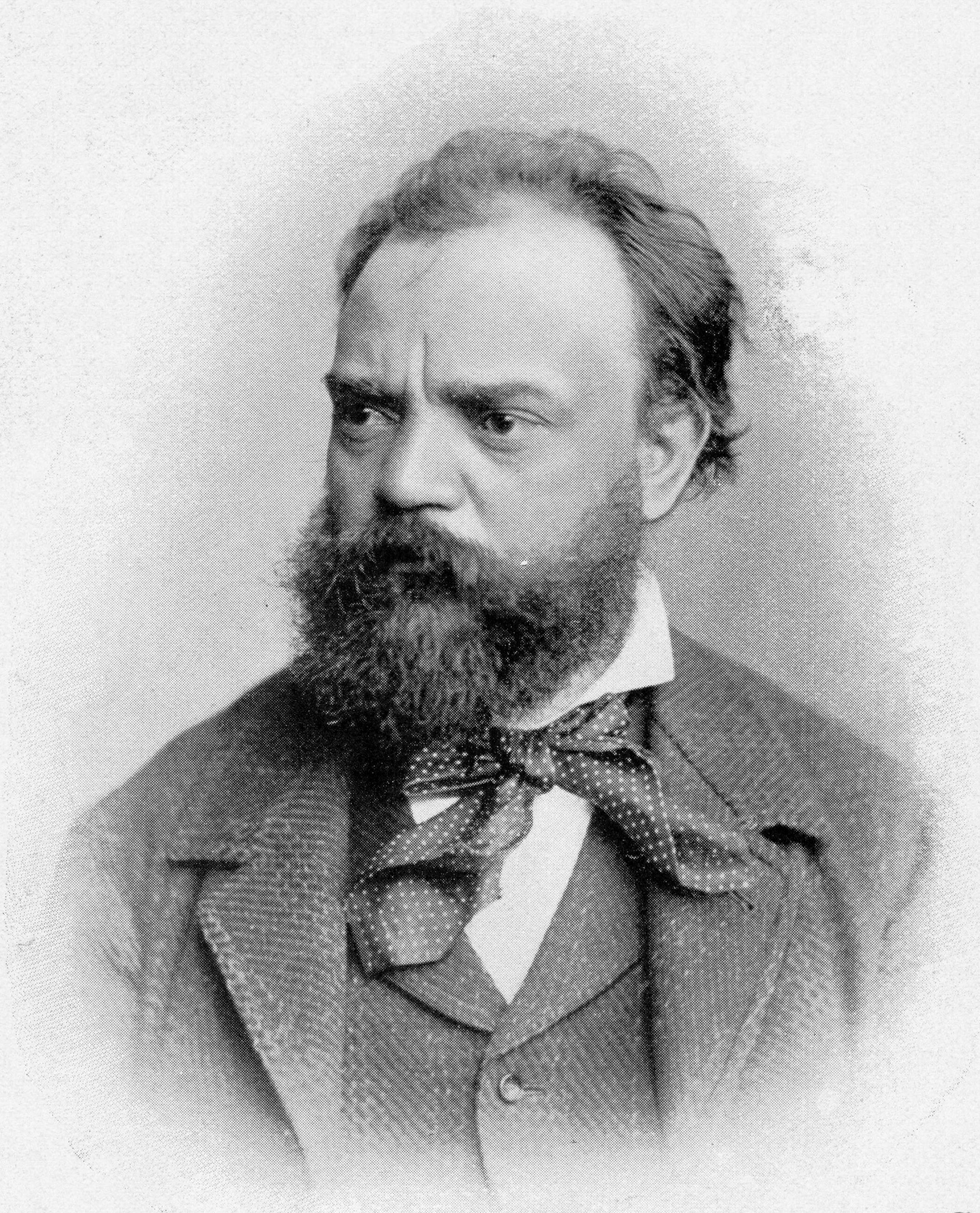
- Dvořák in 1879
- Key: F major
- Catalogue: B. 54
- Opus: 76
- Composed: 1875
- Dedication: Hans von Bülow
- Published: 1888
- Duration: c. 40 min.
- Movements: 4

Premiere
- Date: 25 March 1879
- Location: Prague
- Conductor: Adolf Čech

The Symphony No. 5 in F major, Op. 76, B. 54, is a classical composition by Czech composer Antonín Dvořák. It was originally published as Symphony No. 3.

== The work ==
Dvořák composed his fifth symphony in the summer months in June and July 1875. The opus number is actually incorrect. The autograph was marked with opus number 24, but the publisher Simrock (ignoring the protests of the composer) gave this symphony a high number of 76. It is considered largely pastoral in style, similar to Symphony No. 6 which he wrote about five years later. The symphony was first performed four years after it was written, on 25 March 1879 at the Slav concert of the Academic Readers' Association in the Prague Žofín concert hall, conducted by Adolf Čech. It was published by Simrock in 1888 (also as a piano arrangement for four hands). The composition was revised in the autumn months of 1887.

The symphony is dedicated to Hans von Bülow, in gratitude for the conductor's systematic championing of Dvořák's orchestral works.

== Form ==
External audio
- Performed by the Berlin Philharmonic under Rafael Kubelík
- I. Allegro, ma non troppo
- II. Andante con moto
- III. Andante con moto - Allegro scherzando
- IV. Allegro molto

The work consists of four movements:

1. Allegro ma non troppo (F major), 505 measures
2. Andante con moto (A minor), 201 measures
3. Andante con moto, quasi l'istesso tempo — Allegro scherzando (scherzo in B♭ major, trio in D♭ major), 324 measures
4. Finale: Allegro molto (A minor – F major), 415 measures

A typical performance of the work has a duration of about 40 minutes.

== Instrumentation ==
The symphony is written for an orchestra of two flutes, two oboes, two clarinets in B♭ and A with one doubling on bass clarinet, two bassoons, four horns, two trumpets, three trombones, timpani, triangle, and strings.
