= Libor Pešek =

Czech conductor (1933–2022)

Libor Pešek KBE
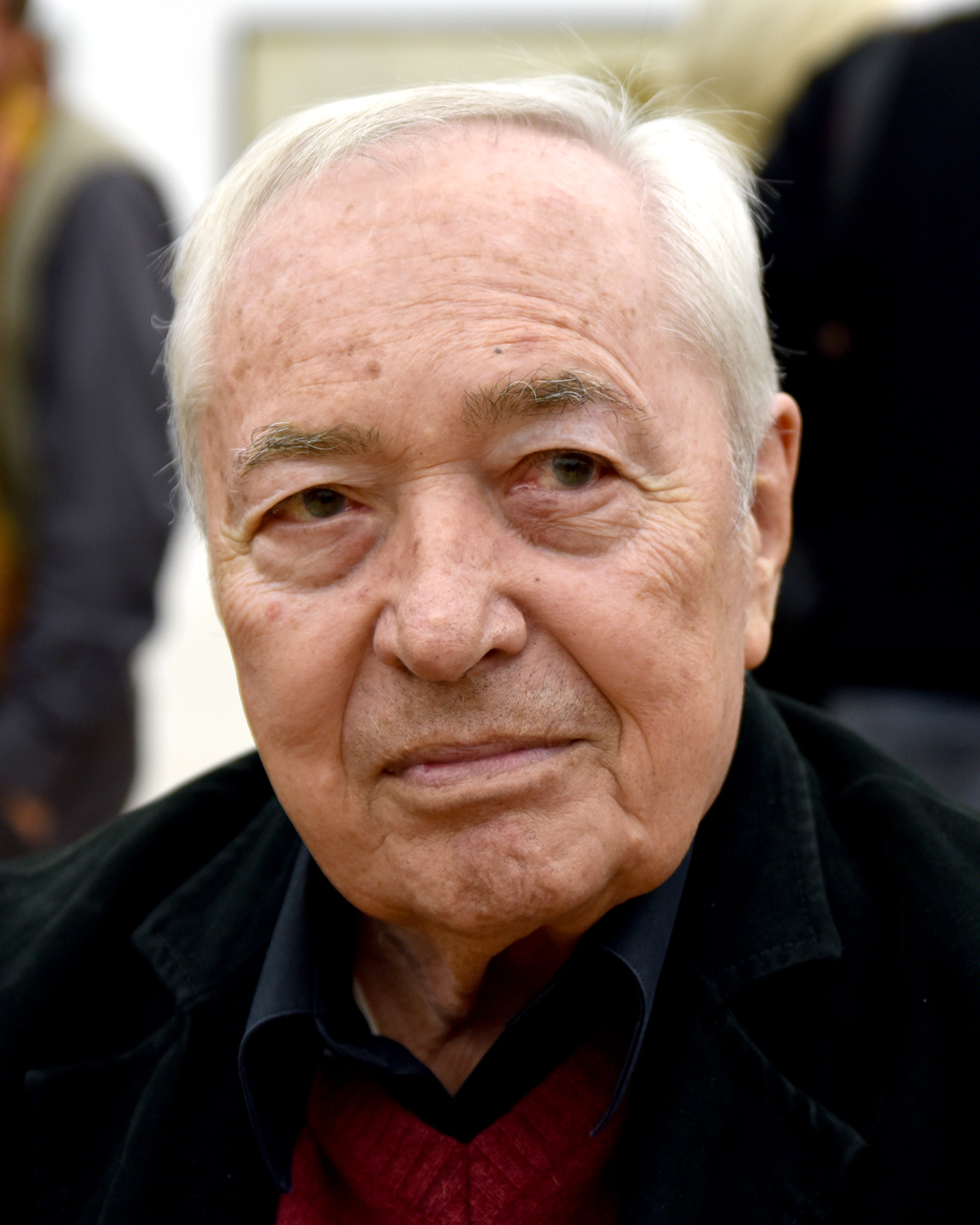
- Pešek in 2019
- Born: 22 June 1933; Prague, Czechoslovakia
- Died: 23 October 2022 (aged 89); Prague, Czech Republic
- Occupation: Conductor
- Organizations: Czech National Symphony Orchestra; Royal Liverpool Philharmonic
- Awards: Czech Medal of Merit

Libor Pešek KBE (22 June 1933 – 23 October 2022) was a Czech conductor. He was among the most famous conductors of his time, working regularly across Europe as chief conductor of orchestras in Prague, but also for ten years with the Royal Liverpool Philharmonic. His career spanned more than 70 years during which he won awards from Great Britain and others. He conducted Czech music by composers such as Vítězslav Novák, Josef Suk and Pavel Josef Vejvanovský better known by performances and recordings.

== Life and career ==
Pešek was born in Prague, Czechoslovakia, on 22 June 1933. He attended a grammar school, where he established his own jazz band. He then studied conducting, piano, cello and trombone at the Academy of Musical Arts, with Václav Smetáček and Karel Ančerl among his teachers.

Pešek worked at the Plzeň Opera and the Prague National Opera. From 1958 to 1964, he was the director of Prague Chamber Harmony, which he founded. In the seventies, he directed orchestras in Leeuwarden and Enschede, Netherlands. He also formed the Sebastian Orchestra. Pešek was chief conductor of the Slovak Philharmonic from 1981 to 1982, and from 1982 to 1990 was conductor-in-residence of the Czech Philharmonic. He served as the conductor at the inauguration of Václav Havel in December 1989.

In the UK, Pešek was music director of the Royal Liverpool Philharmonic (RLPO) from 1987 to 1998, and held the title of conductor laureate then, which included an annual concert. His work with the RLPO included leading the premiere of Anthony Powers' Horn Concerto, with Michael Thompson as the soloist. He led the orchestra in 1993 to open the Prague Spring festival, the first foreign orchestra to be invited. He also took the group on its first tour of the United States. During his time with the RLPO, it was dubbed "the best Czech orchestra outside Prague".

Beginning in 2007, Pešek was the chief conductor of the Czech National Symphony Orchestra. He stood down from this position at the close of the 2018–2019 season.

Pešek was best known for his interpretations of Czech music. He was a champion of lesser known Czech composers, particularly Josef Suk and Vítězslav Novák. His recordings included music of Pavel Josef Vejvanovský.

On 23 October 2022, Jan Hasenöhrl, a Czech trumpeter, announced Pesek´s death, Pesek was 89.

== Awards and honours ==
Pešek was appointed an Honorary Knight Commander of the Order of the British Empire (KBE) in 1996, on the occasion of Queen Elizabeth II's state visit to Prague. He was conferred the First Grade of the Czech Medal of Merit by Václav Havel one year later. In recognition of him selling 635,000 records, Pešek was given a diamond record by Supraphon in 2013.

Cultural offices
Preceded by Paul Freeman	Chief Conductor, Czech National Symphony Orchestra; 2007–2019	Succeeded by Steven Mercurio
