= 1934 in music =

This is a list of notable events in music that took place in the year 1934.

== Specific locations ==
- 1934 in British music
- 1934 in Norwegian music

== Specific genres ==
- 1934 in country music
- 1934 in jazz

== Events ==
- February 23 – In England:
  - Sir Edward Elgar dies aged 76 in Worcester, leaving unfinished his Symphony No. 3, commissioned by the BBC Symphony Orchestra, who will premiere its realised version in 1998.
  - Benjamin Britten's unaccompanied choral variations A Boy Was Born, Op. 3 (written in 1932/3 when the composer was a 19-year-old music student) are premiered in a BBC radio concert of contemporary music with Leslie Woodgate conducting the Wireless Chorus and choirboys of St Mark's, North Audley Street, London.
- March 13 – The French Orchestre national plays its first concert, in Paris.
- May 28 – The Glyndebourne festival of opera is inaugurated in England.
- June – Baritone Sir Henry Lytton retires from the D'Oyly Carte Opera Company.
- September–October – Folk song collector John Lomax makes the first recordings of "Rock Island Line" at prison farms in Arkansas.
- November 7 – Sergei Rachmaninoff's Rhapsody on a Theme of Paganini (written July 3–August 18 at the Villa Senar in Switzerland) is premiered with the composer at the piano at the Lyric Opera House in Baltimore, Maryland, with the Philadelphia Orchestra conducted by Leopold Stokowski. On December 24, the same ensemble make the first recording, at RCA Victor's Trinity Church Studio in Camden, New Jersey.
- November 15 – Wilhelm Furtwängler writes a letter in the Deutsche Allgemeine Zeitung, "Der Fall Hindemith" ("The Hindemith Case"), in support of the composer Paul Hindemith, labelled a degenerate artist by the Nazis, but whose Mathis der Maler Furtwängler premiered earlier in the year. He resigns from his official positions, including that of vice-president of the Reichsmusikkammer.
- December 2 – First public performance by the Quintette du Hot Club de France at the École Normale de Musique in Paris, playing continental jazz, led by guitarist Django Reinhardt with violinist Stéphane Grappelli.
- December 21 – The orchestral suite Lieutenant Kijé, one of Sergei Prokofiev's best-known works, is premiered in Paris.
- A former London roller skating rink reopens as the BBC's Maida Vale Studios and it becomes the home of the BBC Symphony Orchestra.

== Published popular music ==
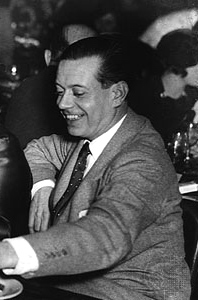
Cole Porter in 1934

- "All I Do Is Dream Of You" w. Arthur Freed m. Nacio Herb Brown. Introduced by Gene Raymond in the film Sadie McKee
- "All Through The Night" w.m. Cole Porter
- "Annie's Cousin Fannie" w.m. Glenn Miller
- "Anything Goes" w.m. Cole Porter
- "As Long as I Live" w. Ted Koehler m. Harold Arlen. Introduced by Lena Horne and Avon Long in the revue Cotton Club Parade
- "Autumn In New York" w.m. Vernon Duke
- "Baby, Take A Bow" w. Lew Brown m. Jay Gorney
- "Be Like The Bluebird" w.m. Cole Porter
- "Beer Barrel Polka" w. (Czech) Vasek Zeman (Eng) Lew Brown m. Jaromir Vejvoda
- "Big John's Special" m. Horace Henderson
- "Blame It On My Youth" w. Edward Heyman m. Oscar Levant
- "Blow, Gabriel, Blow" w.m. Cole Porter
- "Blue Moon" w. Lorenz Hart m. Richard Rodgers
- "The Bluebird Of Happiness" w. Edward Heyman & Harry Parr-Davies m. Sandor Hamati
- "Boll Weevil" w. Lead Belly
- "Cocktails for Two" w.m. Arthur Johnston & Sam Coslow
- "College Rhythm" w. Mack Gordon m. Harry Revel
- "The Continental" w. Herb Magidson m. Con Conrad. Introduced by Ginger Rogers in the film The Gay Divorcee
- "Dames" w. Al Dubin m. Harry Warren
- "Don't Let It Bother You" w. Mack Gordon m. Harry Revel from the film The Gay Divorcee
- "Easy Come, Easy Go" w. Edward Heyman m. Johnny Green
- "Everything Stops for Tea" w.m. Maurice Sigler, Al Goodhart & Al Hoffman
- "Faint Harmony" w. Desmond Carter m. Vivian Ellis from the musical Jill Darling
- "Fair And Warmer" w. Al Dubin m. Harry Warren
- "Fare Thee Well, Annabelle" w. Mort Dixon m. Allie Wrubel
- "For All We Know" w. Sam M. Lewis m. J. Fred Coots
- "Fun To Be Fooled" w. Ira Gershwin & E. Y. Harburg m. Harold Arlen
- "Give Me A Heart To Sing To" w. Ned Washington m. Victor Young
- "The Gypsy In My Soul" w. Moe Jaffe m. Clay Boland
- "Here Come The British" w. Johnny Mercer m. Bernard Hanighen
- "Hold My Hand" w. Jack Yellen & Irving Caesar m. Ray Henderson
- "The House Is Haunted" w. Billy Rose m. Basil G. Adlam. Introduced by Jane Froman in the revue Ziegfeld Follies of 1934
- "I Get a Kick out of You" w.m. Cole Porter
- "I Never Had A Chance" w.m. Irving Berlin
- "I Only Have Eyes For You" w. Al Dubin m. Harry Warren
- "I Think I Can" Douglas Furber, Ray Noble
- "I Wish I Were Twins" w. Frank Loesser & Eddie DeLange m. Joseph Meyer
- "If" w. Robert Hargreaves & Stanley Damerell m. Tolchard Evans
- "If I Had A Million Dollars" w. Johnny Mercer m. Matty Malneck. Introduced by The Boswell Sisters in the film Transatlantic Merry-Go-Round.
- "If There Is Someone Lovelier Than You" w. Howard Dietz m. Arthur Schwartz. Introduced by Georges Metaxa in the musical Revenge with Music
- "I'll Follow My Secret Heart" w.m. Noël Coward, Introduced by Noël Coward and Yvonne Printemps in the musical Conversation Piece
- "I'll String Along With You" w. Al Dubin m. Harry Warren
- "Ill Wind" w. Ted Koehler m. Harold Arlen. Introduced by Aida Ward in the revue Cotton Club Parade
- "I'm On A Seesaw" w. Desmond Carter m. Vivian Ellis from the musical Jill Darling
- "Isle of Capri" w. Jimmy Kennedy m. Will Grosz
- "It's All Forgotten Now" w.m. Ray Noble
- "Judy" w.m. Hoagy Carmichael & Sammy Lerner
- "June In January" w. Leo Robin m. Ralph Rainger Movie: "Here Is My Heart"
- "Junk Man" w. Frank Loesser m. Joseph Meyer
- "Lady Fair" w.m. Cole Porter
- "Let's Take a Walk Around the Block" w. Ira Gershwin & E. Y. Harburg m. Harold Arlen. Introduced by Dixie Dunbar and Earl Oxford in the revue Life Begins at 8:40.
- "Little Man, You've Had a Busy Day" w. Maurice Sigler & Al Hoffman m. Mabel Wayne
- "Lost In A Fog" w. Dorothy Fields m. Jimmy McHugh
- "Love In Bloom" w. Leo Robin m. Ralph Rainger
- "Love Is Just Around The Corner" w. Leo Robin m. Lewis E. Gensler
- "Love Thy Neighbour" w. Mack Gordon m. Harry Revel
- "Midnight, the Stars and You" Jimmy Campbell, Reg Connelly, Harry Woods
- "Miss Otis Regrets" w.m. Cole Porter
- "Moon Country" w. Johnny Mercer m. Hoagy Carmichael
- "The Moon Was Yellow" w. Edgar Leslie m. Fred E. Ahlert
- "Moonglow" w. Eddie DeLange m. Will Hudson & Irving Mills
- "Moonlight Is Silver" Clemence Dane, Richard Addinsell
- "A New Moon Is Over My Shoulder" w. Arthur Freed m. Nacio Herb Brown
- "Nobody Loves A Fairy When She's Forty" w.m. Arthur Le Clerq
- "The Object Of My Affection" w.m. Pinky Tomlin, Coy Poe & Jimmie Grier
- "Okay Toots" w. Gus Kahn m. Walter Donaldson
- "On The Good Ship Lollipop" w.m. Sidney Clare & Richard A. Whiting
- "One Night Of Love" w. Gus Kahn m. Victor Schertzinger
- "Over My Shoulder" w.m. Harry Woods
- "Over Somebody Else's Shoulder" w.m. Al Sherman & Al Lewis
- "P.S. I Love You" w. Johnny Mercer m. Gordon Jenkins
- "Pardon My Southern Accent" w. Johnny Mercer m. Matty Malneck
- "Rhythm Is Our Business" w. Sammy Cahn m. Jimmie Lunceford
- "Ridin' Around in the Rain" w.m. Gene Austin & Carmen Lombardo
- "Riptide" w. Gus Kahn m. Walter Donaldson
- "Rock And Roll" w. Sidney Clare m. Richard A. Whiting
- "Rug Cutter's Swing" m. Horace Henderson
- "Santa Claus Is Coming To Town" w.m. Haven Gillespie & J. Fred Coots
- "She Reminds Me Of You" w. Mack Gordon m. Harry Revel. Introduced by Bing Crosby in the film We're Not Dressing
- "Sing As We Go" w.m. Harry Parr-Davies, Gracie Fields
- "(In My) Solitude" w. Eddie DeLange & Irving Mills m. Duke Ellington
- "Stars Fell on Alabama" w. Mitchell Parish m. Frank Perkins
- "Stay As Sweet As You Are" w. Mack Gordon m. Harry Revel. Introduced by Lanny Ross in the film College Rhythm
- "Stompin' at the Savoy" w. Andy Razaf m. Benny Goodman, Chick Webb & Edgar Sampson
- "Straight from the Shoulder (Right from the Heart)" w. Mack Gordon m. Harry Revel. Introduced by Bing Crosby and Kitty Carlisle in the film She Loves Me Not
- "The Sweetest Music This Side Of Heaven" w.m. Carmen Lombardo & Cliff Friend
- "Take a Number from One to Ten" w. Mack Gordon m. Harry Revel. Introduced by Lyda Roberti in the film College Rhythm.
- "Thank You So Much, Mrs Lowsborough-Goodby" w.m. Cole Porter
- "There Goes My Heart" w. Benny Davis m. Abner Silver
- "Trust in Me" w. Ned Wever m. Milton Ager and Jean Schwartz. Recorded by Mildred Bailey in 1937.
- "Tumbling Tumbleweeds" w.m. Bob Nolan
- "Two Cigarettes In The Dark" w. Paul Francis Webster m. Lew Pollack
- "The Very Thought Of You" w.m. Ray Noble
- "Wagon Wheels" w. Billy Hill m. Peter De Rose
- "What A Diff'rence A Day Made" w. (Eng) Stanley Adams (Sp) Maria Grever m. Maria Grever
- "What a Little Moonlight Can Do" w.m. Harry Woods
- "When A Woman Loves A Man" w. Johnny Mercer m. Bernie Hanighen & Gordon Jenkins
- "When I Grow Too Old To Dream" w. Oscar Hammerstein II m. Sigmund Romberg
- "When My Ship Comes In" w. Gus Kahn m. Walter Donaldson
- "When You've Got A Little Springtime In Your Heart" w.m. Harry Woods. Introduced by Jessie Matthews in the film Evergreen
- "Winter Wonderland" w. Richard B. Smith m. Felix Bernard
- "With Every Breath I Take" w. Leo Robin m. Ralph Rainger
- "With Her Head Tucked Underneath Her Arm" w.m. R. P. Weston & Bert Lee
- "With My Eyes Wide Open, I'm Dreaming" w. Mack Gordon m. Harry Revel. Introduced by Jack Oakie and Dorothy Dell in the film Shoot the Works. Performed by Dean Martin in the 1952 film The Stooge
- "Wonder Bar" w. Al Dubin m. Harry Warren
- "The World Owes Me a Living" w. Larry Morey m. Leigh Harline. Introduced by Pinto Colvig on the soundtrack of the animated short The Grasshopper and the Ants
- "Wrappin' It Up" m. Fletcher Henderson
- "You And The Night And The Music" w. Howard Dietz m. Arthur Schwartz
- "You Oughta Be in Pictures" w. Edward Heyman m. Dana Suesse
- "You're A Builder-Upper" w. Ira Gershwin & E. Y. Harburg m. Harold Arlen
- "You're Not The Only Oyster In The Stew" w. Johnny Burke m. Harold Spina
- "You're the Top" w.m. Cole Porter
- "Zing! Went the Strings of My Heart" w.m. James F. Hanley. Introduced by Hal Le Roy and Eunice Healey in the Broadway revue Thumbs Up!

== Top popular recordings ==
The Great Depression continued to wreak havoc on the American record industry in 1934. The Grigsby-Grunow Company, owner of Columbia Phonograph Company, failed, and Columbia was put up for sale. Columbia operations, catalogue and trademarks, as well as Okeh Records, were purchased by the American Record Corporation (ARC) for $70,000 in July 1934. Columbia's pressing and warehouse facilities, along with equipment and machines, were absorbed by ARC, but for the next four years, both labels were dormant. Decca Records, Ltd., London, UK, formed Decca Records, Inc. in the United States, and began operations in August 1934. Three former Brunswick managers, including Jack Kapp, were hired.

The top popular records of 1934 listed below were compiled from Joel Whitburn's Pop Memories 1890–1954, record sales reported on the "Discography of American Historical Recordings" website, and other sources as specified. Numerical rankings are approximate, there were no Billboard charts in 1934, the numbers are only used for a frame of reference.

Rank	Artist	Title	Label	Recorded	Released	Chart positions
1	Bing Crosby	"June in January"	Decca 310	November 9, 1934	November 24, 1934	US Billboard 1934 #1, US #1 for 7 weeks, 12 total weeks
2	Paul Whiteman and His Orchestra (Vocal Bob Lawrence)	"Smoke Gets in Your Eyes"	Victor 24455	November 3, 1933	December 9, 1933	US Billboard US BB 1934 #2, US #1 for 6 weeks, 15 total weeks, Jazz Standards
3	Bing Crosby	"Love in Bloom"	Brunswick 6936	July 5, 1934	August 4, 1934	US Billboard 1934 #3, US #1 for 6 weeks, 15 total weeks
4	Duke Ellington and His Orchestra	"Cocktails for Two"	Victor 24617	April 12, 1934	May 9, 1934	US Billboard 1934 #4, US #1 for 5 weeks, 15 total weeks, Grammy Hall of Fame 2007
5	Ray Noble and His Orchestra (Vocal Al Bowlly)	"The Very Thought of You"	Victor 24657	April 21, 1934	June 20, 1934	US Billboard 1934 #5, US #1 for 5 weeks, 14 total weeks, Grammy Hall of Fame 2005
6	Ted Fio Rito and His Orchestra	"I'll String Along with You"	Brunswick 6936	March 1, 1934	April 1934	US Billboard 1934 #6, US #1 for 5 weeks, 14 total weeks
7	Bing Crosby	"Little Dutch Mill"	Brunswick 6794	March 10, 1934	March 31, 1934	US Billboard 1934 #7, US #1 for 5 weeks, 11 total weeks
8	Eddy Duchin and His Orchestra	"Let's Fall in Love"	Victor 24510	January 5, 1934	January 17, 1934	US Billboard 1934 #8, US #1 for 5 weeks, 11 total weeks, Grammy Hall of Fame in 1998 (1936)
9	Freddy Martin and His Orchestra	"I Saw Stars"	Brunswick 6948	August 3, 1934	September 1934	US Billboard 1934 #9, US #1 for 4 weeks, 11 total weeks
10	Grace Moore and Metropolitan Orchestra	"One Night of Love"	Brunswick 6994	October 3, 1934	November 1934	US Billboard 1934 #10, US #1 for 4 weeks, 10 total weeks
11	Guy Lombardo and His Royal Canadians	"Stars Fell on Alabama"	Decca 104	August 27, 1934	October 1934	US Billboard 1934 #11, US #1 for 4 weeks, 9 total weeks, Jazz Standards 1934
12	Ray Noble and His Orchestra (Vocal Al Bowlly)	"The Old Spinning Wheel"	Victor 24357	May 10, 1933	October 1933	US Billboard 1934 #12, US #1 for 3 weeks, 22 total weeks
13	Jimmie Grier and His Orchestra	"Stay as Sweet as You Are"	Brunswick 7307	October 5, 1934	November 1934	US Billboard 1934 #13, US #1 for 3 weeks, 8 total weeks
14	Jan Garber and His Orchestra	"All I Do Is Dream Of You"	Victor 24629	May 8, 1934	June 23, 1934	US Billboard 1934 #14, US #1 for 2 weeks, 14 total weeks
15	Jimmie Grier and His Coconut Grove Orchestra	"The Object of My Affection"	Brunswick 7308	October 5, 1934	November 1934	US Billboard 1934 #15, US #1 for 2 weeks, 13 total weeks
16	Enric Madriguera and His Orchestra	"The Carioca"	Columbia 2885	January 24, 1934	March 1934	US Billboard 1934 #16, US #1 for 2 weeks, 10 total weeks
17	Leo Reisman	"The Continental"	Brunswick 6973	May 7, 1934	June 1934	US Billboard 1934 #17, US #1 for 2 weeks, 7 total weeks
18	Benny Goodman and His Orchestra	"Moon Glow"	Columbia 2927	May 14, 1934	June 1934	US Billboard 1934 #18, US #1 for 1 week, 15 total weeks
19	Ted Fio Rito & His Orchestra	"My Little Grass Shack in Kealakekua, Hawaii"	Brunswick 6936	December 13, 1933	January 1934	US Billboard 1934 #19, US #1 for 1 week, 14 total weeks
20	Paul Whiteman and His Orchestra (Vocal Bob Lawrence	"Wagon Wheels"	Victor 24517	January 10, 1934	February 1934	US Billboard 1934 #20, US #1 for 1 week, 12 total weeks

=== Top Christmas hits ===
- "Winter Wonderland" – Richard Himber & His Orchestra
- "Winter Wonderland" – Guy Lombardo

== Classical music ==
=== Premieres ===
Composer	Composition	Date	Location	Performers
Bartók, Béla	Cantata Profana	1934-05-25	London, UK	BBC Symphony Orchestra and Wireless Chorus, Aylmer Buesst (conductor), Trefor Jones (tenor), Frank Phillips (baritone)
Bax, Arnold	Symphony No. 5	1934-01-15	London, UK	London Philharmonic – Beecham
Britten, Benjamin	A Boy Was Born	1934-02-23	BBC radio, UK	Wireless Chorus – Woodgate
Britten, Benjamin	Simple Symphony	1934-03-06	Norwich, UK	Norwich String Orchestra – Britten
Copland, Aaron	Short Symphony	1934-11-23	Mexico City	Mexico Symphony – Chávez
Glazunov, Alexander	Saxophone Concerto	1934-11-26	Nyköping, Sweden	Raschèr / Norrköping Symphony – Benner
Hindemith, Paul	Mathis der Maler Symphony	1934-03-12	Berlin, Germany	Berlin Philharmonic – Furtwängler
Holst, Gustav	Lyric Movement	1934-04-18	London, UK	BBC Symphony – Boult
Ibert, Jacques	Flute Concerto	1934-02-24	Paris, France	Moyse / Paris Conservatory Concert Society Orchestra – Gaubert
Jolivet, André	String Quartet	1934-03-24	Paris, France	Huot Quartet
Prokofiev, Sergei	Lieutenant Kijé (suite)	1934-12-21	Paris, France	– Prokofiev
Rachmaninoff, Sergei	Rhapsody on a Theme of Paganini	1934-11-07	Baltimore, US	Rachmaninov / Philadelphia Orchestra – Stokowski
Shostakovich, Dmitri	Cello Sonata	1934-12-25	Leningrad, Soviet Union	Kubatsky, Shostakovich
Varèse, Edgard	Ecuatorial	1934-04-15	Town Hall, New York City	Baromeo / [ensemble, incl. Lichter, Forstat, Weinrich] – Slonimsky
Vaughan Williams, Ralph	Suite for Viola and Orchestra	1934-11-12	London, UK	Tertis / London Philharmonic – Sargent

=== Compositions ===
- Henk Badings
  - Symphony No. 3
  - Sonata, for cello and piano
- Béla Bartók – String Quartet No. 5
- Arnold Bax – Symphony No. 6
- Benjamin Britten – Simple Symphony
- John Fernström – Symphony No. 4, Op. 27
- Alexander Glazunov – Saxophone Concerto
- Karl Amadeus Hartmann – Miserae
- Qunihico Hashimoto – Cantata Celebrating the Birth of the Prince
- Jacques Ibert – Flute Concerto
- Darius Milhaud – Concertino de Printemps, for violin and orchestra
- Sergei Prokofiev – Egyptian Nights suite
- Nico Richter – Sonatine, for piano
- Harald Sæverud – Canto Ostinato
- Arnold Schoenberg – Suite in G major, for string orchestra
- Leopold Spinner – Passacaglia
- Germaine Tailleferre – Concerto for 2 Pianos, Eight Solo Voices, Saxophone Quartet and Orchestra
- Eduard Tubin – Symphony No. 1 in C minor (1931–34)
- Edgard Varèse – Ecuatorial (1932–34)
- Heitor Villa-Lobos – Uirapuru, symphonic poem and ballet (begun 1917)
- Kōsaku Yamada – Nagauta Symphony

== Opera ==
- Vittorio Giannini – Lucedia
- Gustav Holst – The Wandering Scholar
- Leoš Janáček – Destiny
- Dmitri Shostakovich – Lady Macbeth of the Mtsensk District
- Virgil Thomson – Four Saints in Three Acts (libretto by Gertrude Stein)

== Film ==
- Hubert Bath – Wings Over Everest
- Sergei Prokofiev – Lieutenant Kijé
- Willy Schmidt-Gentner – Maskerade
- Max Steiner – The Lost Patrol

== Musical theatre ==
- Anything Goes – Broadway production opened at the Alvin Theatre on November 21 and ran for 420 performances
- The Bing Boys Are Here – London revival
- Calling All Stars – Broadway revue with music by Harry Akst and lyrics by Lew Brown
- Caviar – Broadway production opened at the Forrest Theatre on June 7 and ran for 20 performances
- Cotton Club Parade – Cotton Club Harlem, starring Adelaide Hall ran for eight months
- Conversation Piece – London productions opened at His Majesty's Theatre on February 16 and ran for 177 performances; Broadway production opened at the 44th Street Theatre on October 23 and ran for 55 performances
- The Great Waltz – Broadway production opened at the Center Theatre on September 22 and ran for 298 performances. The show returned only two months later for a further run of 49 performances
- Here's How – London production opened at the Saville Theatre on February 22. Starring George Robey
- Jill Darling – London production opened at the Saville Theatre on December 19 and ran for 242 performances, starring Frances Day, John Mills and Louise Browne.
- Lucky Break – London production opened at the Shaftesbury Theatre on November 14 and ran for 198 performances
- Mr. Whittington – London production opened at the Hippodrome on February 1, starring Jack Buchanan and Elsie Randolph
- Revenge with Music – Broadway production opened on November 28 at the New Amsterdam Theatre and ran for 158 performances
- Sporting Love – opened at the Gaiety Theatre on March 31 and ran for 302 performances
- Streamline – London production opened at the Palace Theatre on September 28
- Thumbs Up! – Broadway revue opened at the St. James Theatre on December 27 and ran for 156 performances
- Yes, Madam? – (Music: Jack Waller and Joseph Tunbridge Lyrics: R. P. Weston and Bert Lee Book: R. P. Weston, Bert Lee and R. G. Browne) London production opened at the Hippodrome on September 27 and ran for 302 performances
- Yours Sincerely – London revue opened at Daly's Theatre on February 19, starring Binnie Barnes
- Ziegfeld Follies of 1934 – Broadway revue opened at the Winter Garden Theatre on January 4 and ran for 182 performances

== Musical films ==
- Babes In Toyland starring Stan Laurel and Oliver Hardy
- Bachelor of Arts starring Tom Brown, Anita Louise, Henry Walthall, Arline Judge and Mae Marsh, directed by Louis King
- Belle of the Nineties starring Mae West
- The Big Road starring Jin Yan and Li Lili (silent film with music and sound effects added post-production)
- Blossom Time starring Richard Tauber
- Boots! Boots! starring George Formby and Beryl Formby, and featuring Betty Driver and Harry Hudson & his Band
- Bottoms Up starring Spencer Tracy, Pat Paterson, John Boles and Thelma Todd
- The Cat and the Fiddle starring Ramon Novarro, Jeanette MacDonald, Frank Morgan and Vivienne Segal
- Cockeyed Cavaliers starring Bert Wheeler, Robert Woolsey, Dorothy Lee, Noah Beery and Thelma Todd, directed by Mark Sandrich
- College Rhythm starring Joe Penner, Jack Oakie, Lyda Roberti and Lanny Ross
- Dames starring Joan Blondell, Dick Powell, Ruby Keeler and ZaSu Pitts
- Down to Their Last Yacht starring Mary Boland, Polly Moran and Ned Sparks, directed by Paul Sloane
- Evergreen starring Jessie Matthews
- The Gay Divorcee starring Fred Astaire and Ginger Rogers
- Gay Love starring Florence Desmond and Sophie Tucker
- George White's Scandals starring Alice Faye, Rudy Vallee, Jimmy Durante and Cliff Edwards
- Gift of Gab starring Edmund Lowe, Ruth Etting and Ethel Waters
- Give Her a Ring starring Wendy Barrie
- The Grasshopper and the Ants animated short
- Happiness Ahead starring Dick Powell and Dorothy Dare
- Here Is My Heart starring Bing Crosby and Kitty Carlisle, directed by Frank Tuttle
- Hips, Hips, Hooray! starring Bert Wheeler, Robert Woolsey, Thelma Todd and Ruth Etting
- Hollywood Party starring Stan Laurel, Oliver Hardy, Jimmy Durante, Lupe Vélez, Polly Moran, Charles Butterworth, Frances Williams, June Clyde and Mickey Mouse, directed by Ray Rowland
- Kid Millions starring Eddie Cantor, Ann Sothern, Ethel Merman and George Murphy
- Melody in Spring starring Lanny Ross, Mary Boland, Charles Ruggles and Ann Sothern
- The Merry Widow starring Maurice Chevalier, Jeanette MacDonald, Edward Everett Horton and Una Merkel
- Moulin Rouge starring Constance Bennett and Franchot Tone and featuring Russ Columbo and The Boswell Sisters
- Mister Cinders starring W. H. Berry, Clifford Mollison and Zelma O'Neal
- Murder at the Vanities starring Carl Brisson, Kitty Carlisle, Victor McLaglen and Jack Oakie and featuring Duke Ellington
- Music in the Air starring Gloria Swanson and John Boles
- She Loves Me Not starring Bing Crosby, Miriam Hopkins and Kitty Carlisle
- Shoot the Works starring Jack Oakie, Ben Bernie and Dorothy Dell
- Student Tour starring Jimmy Durante, Charles Butterworth, Maxine Doyle, Phil Regan, Monte Blue, Betty Grable and Nelson Eddy, directed by Charles Reisner
- Transatlantic Merry-Go-Round released November 1 starring Gene Raymond, Nancy Carroll, Mitzi Green and Frank Parker and featuring The Boswell Sisters, Jean Sargent and Jimmie Grier and his Orchestra
- Wake Up and Dream starring Russ Columbo, June Knight and Wini Shaw
- Waltzes from Vienna starring Jessie Matthews
- We're Not Dressing starring Bing Crosby, Carole Lombard, George Burns, Gracie Allen and Ethel Merman
- Wonder Bar starring Al Jolson, Kay Francis, Dolores del Río and Dick Powell
- Zouzou starring Josephine Baker and Jean Gabin

== Births ==
- January 16 – Marilyn Horne, mezzo soprano
- January 21 – Eva Olmerová, Czech pop and jazz musician (died 1993)
- January 24 – Ann Cole, American singer (died 1986)
- January 26 – Huey "Piano" Smith, American R&B pianist (died 2023)
- January 30 – Tammy Grimes, actress and singer (died 2016)
- February 1 – Bob Shane, American folk singer (The Kingston Trio) (died 2020)
- February 2 – Skip Battin, American rock singer-songwriter (The Byrds, New Riders of the Purple Sage) (died 2003)
- February 7
  - King Curtis, American saxophonist (died 1971)
  - Earl King, American singer-songwriter, guitarist and producer (died 2003)
- February 8 – Jan Kirsznik, Polish rock saxophonist (died 2018)
- February 14 – Florence Henderson, American actress and singer (died 2016)
- February 23
  - Yevgeny Krylatov, Soviet and Russian composer (died 2019)
  - Augusto Algueró, Spanish composer (died 2011)
- February 24 – Renata Scotto, Italian operatic soprano (died 2023)
- March 2 – Bernard Rands, British-born American composer (died 2026)
- March 4 – John Dunn, British DJ (died 2004)
- March 8 – Christian Wolff, American composer
- March 16 – Roger Norrington, English conductor (died 2025)
- March 18 – Charley Pride, American country singer and baseball player (died 2020)
- March 25 – Johnny Burnette, American rockabilly pioneer (died 1964)
- March 29 – Delme Bryn-Jones, Welsh operatic baritone (died 2001)
- March 31
  - Richard Chamberlain, American actor and singer (died 2025)
  - Shirley Jones, American singer and actress
  - John D. Loudermilk, American singer-songwriter (died 2016)
- April 1 – Jim Ed Brown, country singer-songwriter (The Browns) (died 2015)
- April 16
  - Vince Hill, singer (died 2023)
  - Robert Stigwood, music promoter (died 2015)
- April 19 – Dickie Goodman, pioneer of music sampling (died 1989)
- April 24 – Shirley MacLaine, born Shirley MacLean Beaty, American actress and singer
- April 29 – Otis Rush, blues musician (died 2018)
- May 1 – Shirley Horn, American singer (died 2005)
- May 3 – Frankie Valli, singer (The Four Seasons)
- May 5
  - Ace Cannon, saxophonist (died 2018)
  - Johnnie Taylor, singer-songwriter (died 2000)
- May 6 – Oskar Gottlieb Blarr, composer
- May 9 – Soo Bee Lee, operatic soprano (died 2005)
- May 18 – Jack Ashford, American musician
- May 24 – Dr Barry Rose, English choir-trainer and organist
- June 1 – Pat Boone, American singer
- June 9 – Jackie Wilson, American singer (died 1984)
- June 11 – James "Pookie" Hudson, American R&B frontman (The Spaniels) (died 2007)
- June 21 – Cornel Țăranu, Romanian composer (died 2023)
- June 21 – Luigi Albertelli, Italian lyricist
- June 24 – Gloria Christian, Italian canzone Napoletana singer
- June 26 – Dave Grusin, American pianist and composer
- July 8 – Alice Gerrard, American singer and banjo player
- July 12 – Van Cliburn, American concert pianist (died 2013)
- July 15 – Harrison Birtwistle, English composer (died 2022)
- July 21 – Jonathan Miller, English opera director and polymath (died 2019)
- July 24 – Héctor Ochoa Cárdenas, Colombian composer (died 2026)
- July 28 – Jacques d'Amboise, American dancer and choreographer (died 2021)
- July 30 – André Prévost, Canadian composer (died 2001)
- August 5 – Vern Gosdin, country music singer (died 2009)
- August 9 – Merle Kilgore, country singer/songwriter (died 2005)
- August 10 – James Tenney, composer and music theorist (died 2006)
- August 18 – Ronnie Carroll, Northern Irish popular singer (died 2015)
- September 3 – Freddie King, American blues guitarist and singer (died 1976)
- September 4 – Otto Brandenburg, Danish singer and actor (died 2007)
- September 5 – Bira, Brazilian musician and guitarist (died 2019)
- September 7 – Little Milton, American blues singer and guitarist (died 2005)
- September 8 – Peter Maxwell Davies, composer (died 2016)
- September 16 – Ronnie Drew, Irish folk musician (died 2008)
- September 19 – Brian Epstein, English manager of The Beatles (died 1967)
- September 21 – Leonard Cohen, Canadian poet and singer (died 2016)
- September 23 – Gino Paoli, Italian singer/songwriter
- September 30 – Ronald Turini, pianist
- October 1 – Geoff Stephens, English songwriter and record producer (died 2020)
- October 13 – Nana Mouskouri, Greek singer
- October 17 – Rico Rodriguez, Cuban-born Jamaican ska trombonist (died 2015)
- October 20 – Eddie Harris, American saxophonist (died 1996)
- October 22 – Donald McIntyre, New Zealand operatic bass-baritone (died 2025)
- October 26
  - Jacques Loussier, French classical/jazz pianist (died 2019)
  - Ferenc Rados, Hungarian pianist (died 2024)
- October 30 – Frans Brüggen, Dutch flutist, recorder player and conductor (died 2014)
- November 1 – William Mathias, composer (died 1992)
- November 7 – Sunanda Patnaik, Indian classical singer (died 2020)
- November 11 – Willi Tokarev, Russian-American singer-songwriter (died 2019)
- November 15 – Peter Dickinson, composer and musicologist (died 2023)
- November 18 – Tulsidas Borkar, Indian composer (died 2018)
- November 19 – Dave Guard, folk singer (The Kingston Trio) (died 1991)
- November 24 – Alfred Schnittke, composer (died 1998)
- December 1 – Billy Paul, soul singer (died 2016)
- December 9 – Alan Ridout, composer and music teacher (died 1996)
- December 12 – Habib Hassan Touma, composer and ethnomusicologist (died 1998)
- December 16 – Jim Parker, tv composer (died 2023)
- December 19 – Rudi Carrell, Dutch singer, entertainer (died 2006)
- December 30
  - Del Shannon, singer (died 1990)
  - Russ Tamblyn, dancer, singer and actor

== Deaths ==
- January 12 – Paul Kochanski, violinist, composer and arranger, 46 (cancer)
- January 18 – Otakar Ševčík, violinist, 81
- February 4 – Ernesto Nazareth, pianist and composer, 70 (drowned)
- February 23 – Edward Elgar, composer, 76
- February 24 – Pyotr Slovtsov, operatic tenor, 47
- February 27 – Gene Rodemich, pianist and orchestra leader, 43
- March 21 – Franz Schreker, composer and conductor, 55
- April 12 – Thaddeus Cahill, inventor of the teleharmonium
- April 22 – Augusto de Lima, writer and musician
- April 28 – Charlie Patton, blues musician, 42
- May 7 – Edward Naylor, organist and composer, 57
- May 19 – Émile Pierre Ratez, violist and composer, 82
- May 25 – Gustav Holst, composer, 59 (complications following surgery)
- May 26 – Robert Samut, composer of the Maltese national anthem, 64
- June 10 – Frederick Delius, composer, 82
- June 13 – Charlie Gardiner, ice hockey player and amateur singer (born 1904) (brain hemorrhage)
- July 9 – C. Mortimer Wiske, American choral conductor, organist, and composer, 81
- July 14 – Ernst Eduard Taubert, composer, 95
- September 2
  - Russ Columbo, violinist, 26 (shot)
  - Alcide Nunez, jazz musician, 50
- September 10 – Sir George Henschel, operatic baritone, pianist and conductor, 84
- September 24 – Edwin Lemare, organist and composer, 68
- October 3 – Henri Marteau, French violinist, 60
- October 13 – Theodore Baker, American musicologist, 83
- October 14 – Leonid Sobinov, Russian operatic tenor, 62 (heart attack)
- October 26 – Marie Jahn, Austrian operatic soprano, 69
- November 12 – Henri Verbrugghen, violinist and conductor, 61
- November 14 – Blanche Ray Alden, pianist and composer, 64
- December 15 – Bernhard Sekles, composer and music teacher, 62
- December 19 – Francis Planté, pianist, 95
- date unknown
  - Eddie Anthony, jazz violinist (born 1890)
  - Olimpia Boronat, operatic soprano
  - Alice Verlet, operatic soprano (born 1873)
