= List of operas based on the Andromeda myth =

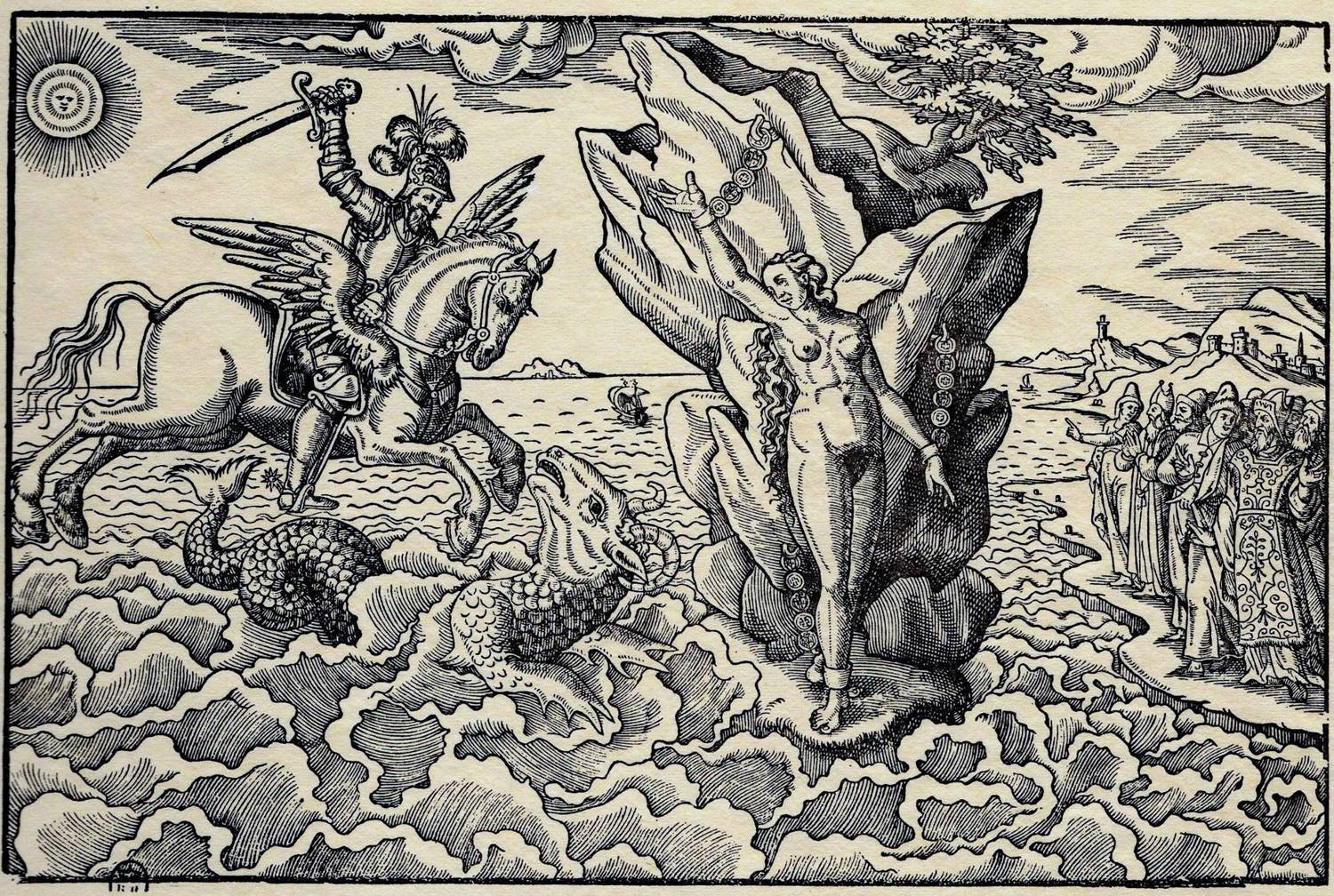
La délivrance de la France par le Persée (1594), Anonymous. Depicts Perseus rescuing Andromeda from the sea monster Cetus.

The Greek myth of Andromeda has been the source material for numerous opera libretti. According to Grove Music Online, the tale of the rescue of Andromeda from a sea monster by Perseus was one of the most popular subjects of early opera with more than 25 unrelated opera libretti written and performed before 1800. While less often a source for the opera stage after 1800, the myth has remained an inspiration for opera adaptations into the 21st century.

== Overview ==
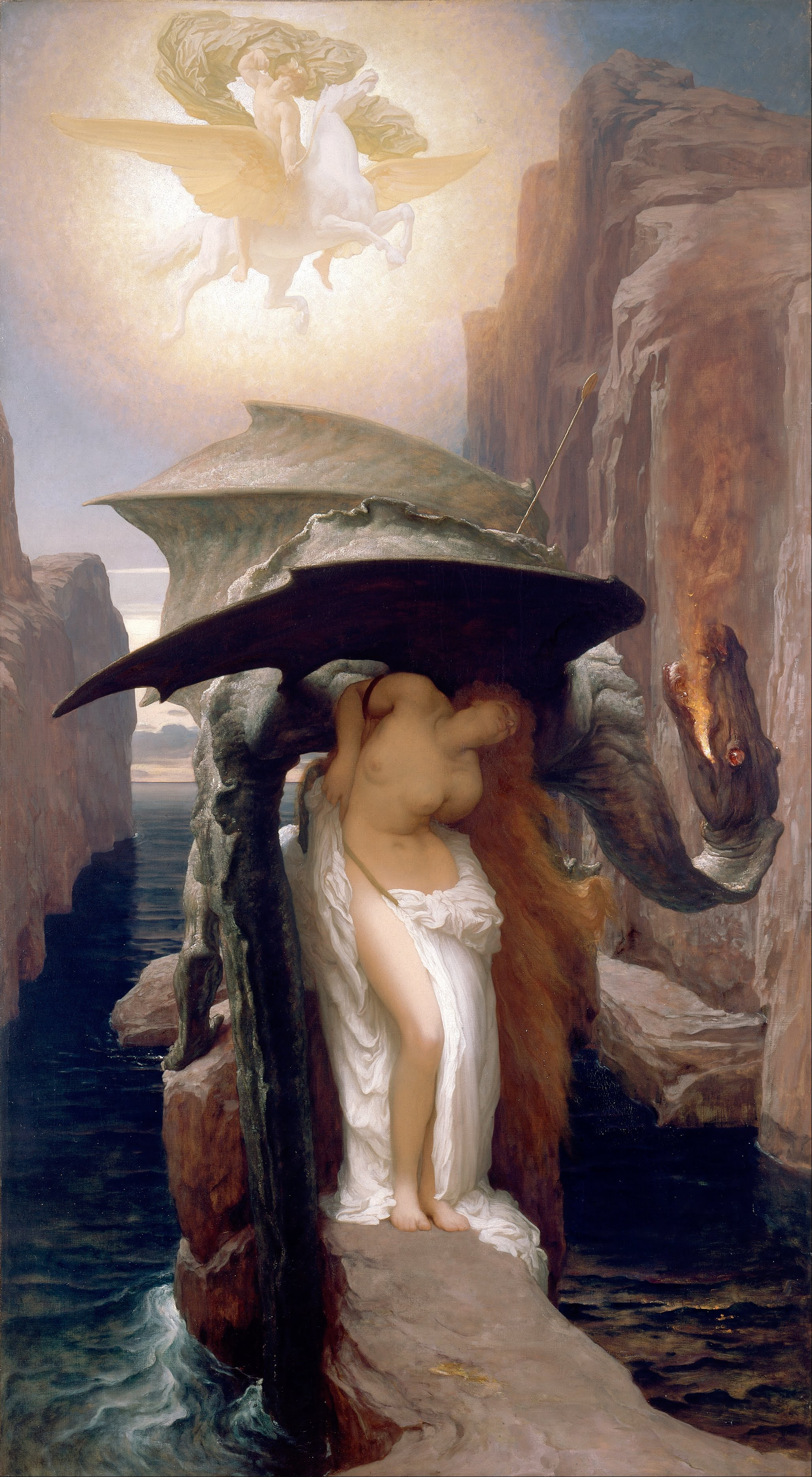
Perseus and Andromeda (1891) by Frederic Leighton

=== Myth ===
The myth centers on Andromeda, the daughter of Queen Cassiopeia and King Cepheus of Aethiopia. Cassiopeia has angered the Nereids, sea nymphs, by boasting that she is more beautiful than they. The Nereids appeal to Poseidon who threatens the safety of Aethiopia as punishment. In order to appease him, Cassiopeia and Cepheus offer up Andromeda as a human sacrifice. She is stripped naked and is chained to a rock in Jaffa with the intent that she be consumed by the sea creature Cetus sent by Poseidon. She is rescued by Perseus, who arrives by flight on winged sandals or Pegasus, fresh from his defeat of the Gorgon Medusa.

=== Opera adaptations ===
The earliest known opera based on the Andromeda myth was performed in Venice in 1587. Other early operas based on the myth were composed by Girolamo Giacobbi (1610), Domenico Belli (1618), and Claudio Monteverdi (premiered 1620). Francesco Manelli and Benedetto Ferrari's Andromeda was a groundbreaking moment in the history of opera when it was staged in Venice in 1637 for the inauguration of the Teatro San Cassiano. Considered the "first commercial opera", the event marked the first time in theatre history that an opera was staged in a public theatre with tickets available for purchase by the general public.

Pedro Calderón de la Barca's play with music Fortunas de Andrómeda y Perseo (1653) has sometimes been designated an opera or semi-opera as it contains scenes with sung arias and sung dialogue (ie recitative). Its score of uncertain authorship is often attributed to Juan Hidalgo. The work has been referred to in some sources as "Spain’s first opera"; although there are other potential candidates both earlier and later for that claim depending on how one defines what an opera is and what makes an opera Spanish in origin.

Music historian Dale E. Monson asserts that most, but not all, of the opera adaptations of the Andromeda myth have ignored the details of the wider myth and focused the various opera adaptations on the part of the story dealing with the sea monster Cetus's defeat by Perseus. Some opera librettists, such as Philippe Quinault who wrote for Lully's Persée (1682) and Vittorio Amedeo Cigna-Santi whose libretto Andromeda was first set by Gioacchino Cocchi in 1755, chose to introduce a foreign prince or other competing suitor into the story not found in the original myth in order to create a love triangle in the relationship between Andromeda and Perseus. In Johann Friedrich Reichardt and Antonio de' Filistri da Caramondani's Andromeda (1788) an invented third seductor, Fineo, tries to steal Andromeda.

In 2004 the Venice Baroque Orchestra revived the 1726 pastiche Andromeda Liberata in a reconstruction by the violinist Olivier Fourés. Fourés attributed a large portion of the score to Antonio Vivaldi; an attribution disputed by musicologist Michael Talbot who asserted that Vivaldi contributed only a small amount of music. The New York Times coverage of this work stated: "Andromeda is now a subject of a fierce dispute within the normally quiet world of music scholarship, led by two contestants who could pass for David and Goliath".

The librretto for Ibert's Persée et Andromède (1921) chose to emphasize Andromeda's endangerment not from starvation or vulnerability to the elements but from the boredom of her captivity at Jaffa. Other 20th and 21st century operas on the Andromeda myth include works composed by Pierre Maurice (1924), Salvatore Sciarrino (1990), and Agustí Charles (2021).

== Operas based on the Andromeda myth ==
Year	Title	Composer	Librettist	Description	First Performance	Notes	References
1587	Andromeda	unknown	unknown	"tragedia boschereccia"	1587, Venice	Sung in Italian	
1610	Andromeda	Girolamo Giacobbi	Ridolfo Campeggi		1610, San Petronio, Bologna	Sung in Italian	
1618	L'Andromeda favola marittima	Domenico Belli	Jacopo Cicognini		9 March 1618, Florence, Palazzo della Gherardesca	Sung in Italian	
1620	Andromeda	Claudio Monteverdi	Ercole Marigliani	favola in musica	March 1620	Created between 1618 and 1620. The music is lost, but a libretto published in 1620 was later found.	
1637	Andromeda	Francesco Manelli	Benedetto Ferrari	opera in three acts	February 1637, Venice	Sung in Italian. Performed for the opening of the Teatro San Cassiano.	
1638	Andromeda	Michelangelo Rossi	Ascanio Pio di Savoia	"Cantata e cambuttuta"	1638 Carnival, Ferrara	While labeled a type of cantata by its creators, this work is considered the first opera staged in the city of Ferrara.	
1644	Andromeda	Marco Scacchi	Virgilio Puccitelli		6 March 1644, Vilnius	Sung in Polish.	
1653	Fortunas de Andrómeda y Perseo	Juan Hidalgo?	Pedro Calderón de la Barca	play with music		Sung in Spanish. According to musicologist Louise K. Stein this play with music could be considered a semi-opera because it included fully-sung scenes with sung dialogue. While the composer is unknown, it is speculated that court musician Juan Hidalgo, who frequently collaborated with la Barca, is the composer.	
1662	Andromeda	Isidore Tortona	Carlo Bassi		17 May 1662, Piacenza	Sung in Italian. Starred Silvia Gailarti Manni in the title role at premiere.	
1675	Die errettete Unschuld, oder Andromeda und Perseus	Johann Wolfgang Franck	Adapted by Franck from Andromède by Pierre Corneille		1675, Ansbach	Sung in German. It was revived in Hamburg in 1679	
1682	Persée	Jean-Baptiste Lully	Philippe Quinault	tragédie lyrique	18 April 1682, Théâtre du Palais-Royal, Paris	Sung in French.	
1692	Andromeda	Johann Sigismund Kusser	unknown	Singspiel in three acts.	20 February 1692, Opernhaus am Hagenmarkt, Braunschweig	Sung in German.	
1707	Andromeda	Antonio Maria Bononcini	Pietro Bernardoni	Poemetto dramatico		Sung in Italian.	
1709	Il trionfo d'Amore	Antonio Caldara	unknown	serenata	1709, Rome, Palazzo Bonelli	Sung in Italian	
1714	Andromeda	Marc'Antonio Ziani	Pietro Pariati	poemetto drammatic	1714, Vienna Hofoper	The last of Ziani's many operas.	
1721	L'Andromeda	Domenico Sarro	Giuseppe Di Rosa	Drama per musica da cantarsi	1721, Naples	Sung in Italian.	
1725	Andromeda liberata	Franz Xaver Müller	unknown		1725, Cologne		
1726	Andromeda Liberata	Various; including Antonio Vivaldi	Various	pastiche	18 September 1726	Sung in Italian.	
1738	Le nozze di Perseo e Andromeda	Giuseppe Maria Orlandini	Antonio Marchi	azione drammatica in 3 acts	9 April 1738, Florence	Sung in Italian	
1750	Andromeda liberata	Various	unknown	pastiche	1750, Vienna	One of three operas performed by a company led by Rocco Lo Presti in 1750. While specific details on the other two operas performed are known, the exact date and location of the Andromeda liberata performance is unclear. The cast was led by Vittoria Tesi, Angelo Maria Amorevoli, and Giovanni Cinzio Tedeschi. The opera used new text by an unknown poet, and the music was a mix of both old and new material by a variety of composers. New music was contributed by Georg Christoph Wagenseil and Ignaz Holzbauer. Borrowed material included music by Girolamo Abos, Andrea Bernasconi, Baldassare Galuppi, George Frideric Handel, Johann Adolph Hasse, Niccolò Jommelli, Leonardo Leo, and Domenico Sarro.	
1753	Andromeda	Davide Perez	unknown	opera seria	1753, Lisbon	Grove Music Online indicates that this may have been a reworking or recycling of music Perez had used earlier in his 1750 opera Andromaca.	
1755	Andromeda	Gioacchino Cocchi	Vittorio Amedeo Cigna-Santi	dramma per mussica	18 January 1755, Turin	Sung in Italian. Performed for the Carnival season at the Teatro Regio.	
1771	Andromeda	Giuseppe Colla	Vittorio Amedeo Cigna-Santi	opera seria in 3 acts	26 December 1771, Teatro Regio, Turin	Sung in Italian	
1771	Andromeda	Ignazio Fiorillo	Vittorio Amedeo Cigna-Santi		1771, Kassel		
1774	Andromeda	Giovanni Paisiello	Vittorio Amedeo Cigna-Santi		January 1774, Milan, Teatro Regio Ducale	Sung in Italian	
1775	Perseo ed Andromeda	Giuseppe Gazzaniga	Vittorio Amedeo Cigna-Santi	opera seria	15 September 1775, Florence, Teatro della Pergola	Sung in Italian	
1776	Andromeda	Gotthilf von Baumgarten	unknown	monodrama	Was first staged in Braunschweig in 1776 on an unknown day. Score was published that year.	Sung in German.	
1780	Persée	François-André Danican Philidor	Jean-François Marmontel, adapted from the libretto by Philippe Quinault		27 October 1780, Paris	Sung in French.	
1781	Andromeda und Perseus	Anton Zimmermann	Wolfgang von Kempelen and Benedikt Dominik Anton Cremeri	melodrama in one act	3 April 1781, Hofburgtheater, Vienna	Sung in German.	
1783	Andromeda und Perseus	Georg Druschetzky	Benedict Dominik Anton Cremeri	melodrama	1783, Linz	Sung in German	
1784	Andromeda e Perseo	Luigi Marescalchi	Palma		Carnival 1784, Rome, Teatro Argentina		
1787	Andromeda e Perseo	Michael Haydn	Giambattista Varesco		14 March 1787		
1788	Andromeda	Johann Friedrich Reichardt	Antonio de' Filistri da Caramondani	"singeschauspiel" in three acts	11 January 1788, Königliche Opernhaus, Berlin	Sung in German.	
1792	Andromeda	Possibly Johann Gottlieb Naumann	unknown	opera seria	1792, Dresden	The authorship of this opera is uncertain.	
1796	Andromeda	Niccolò Antonio Zingarelli	Giovanni Bertati		1796, Venice	Sung in Italian	
1798	Andromeda	Giuseppe Sarti	Ferdinando Moretti	dramma per musica	1798, St Petersburg, Hermitage Theatre	Sources vary as to whether the premiere occurred on 24 October or 24 November in 1798.	
1802	Andromeda i Persey	Alexey Titov	Aleksandr Yakovlevich Knyazhnin	melodrama		Sung in Russian.	
1805	Andromeda	Vittorio Trento	Giovanni Schmidt	opera seria in 2 acts	30 May 1805, Naples, Teatro di San Carlo	Sung in Italian.	
1807	Andromeda	Friedrich Schneider	Heinrich Seidel	opera in three acts	First staged in Leipzig in 1807.	Sung in German,	
1807	Andromeda	Józef Elsner	Ludwik Osiński	opera in one act	14 January 1807, National Theatre, Warsaw	Sung in Polish.	
1921	Persée et Andromède	Jacques Ibert	Michael Veber	opera in two acts	15 May 1929, Paris	Composed in 1921, the work did not premiere until eight years later. Sung in French.	
1924	Andromède	Pierre Maurice	Madeleine Maurice	opera in three acts	23 April 1924, Stadttheater Basel	French-language opera completed in 1913. It was not staged or published until 1924 when it was performed in a German-language translation by Hanns von Gumppenberg.	
1990	Perseo e Andromeda	Salvatore Sciarrino	Salvatore Sciarrino, after Jules Laforgue	opera in one act	27 January 1991, Staatsoper Stuttgart	Completed in 1990. First performed in 1991, and published in 1992.	
2021	Andrómeda encadenada	Agustí Charles	Marc Rosich,	chamber opera	28 October 2021, Palau de la Música Catalana, Barcelona, Spain	Sung in Spanish.	

== Other related works ==
- Andromède (1650), a play by Pierre Corneille for which composer Marc-Antoine Charpentier contributed music in its 1682 revival.
- The Flying Lovers, or Perseus and Andromeda (1716), a pantomime with music by Johann Christoph Pepusch and a libretto by John Weaver which was staged at the Theatre Royal, Drury Lane. While technically a pantomime, this work has elements close enough to an opera that it has been listed as such in some published material.
- Andromède et Persée (c. 1732), a secular cantata by composer Laurent Gervais
- "Ah, lo previdi" (1777), a concert aria for soprano and orchestra by Wolfgang Amadeus Mozart. The text is taken from the Andromeda libretto by Vittorio Amedeo Cigna-Santi, and is sung by the character Andromeda.
- Andromède (1883), a symphonic poem by Augusta Holmès inspired by the Andromeda myth
