= Angélique (opera) =

Angélique is a 1927 French opera ("farce in one act") by Jacques Ibert to a libretto by "Nino", pseudonym of Michel Veber, which premiered at the Théâtre Fémina in Paris on 28 January 1927.

== Background ==
Angélique is the second of seven operas by Ibert. Writing in 1943 Landormy described it as, along with Escales, one of his most widely known works "for its deliciously picturesque comedy" and curious orchestral effects allied with its solid and harmonic construction. Langham Smith calls it "a concise and fast-moving work", and where the scenario is "captured with 'wrong-note' harmonies, bitonality and a constantly nervous rhythmic drive.

== Roles ==
Role	Voice type	Premiere cast, 28 January 1927 (Conductor: Vladimir Golschmann)
Angélique, wife of Boniface	soprano	Marguerite Bériza
First neighbour	soprano	
Second neighbour	mezzo-soprano	
Boniface	baritone	Marc Ducros
Charlot	baritone	Warnéry
L'Italien	tenor	Max Moutia
L'Anglais	tenor	Parker Steward
The negro	bass	Marvini
The devil	baritone	Palauda
Chorus of Neighbours

== Synopsis ==
In a small French seaside town Boniface, owner of a china shop wants to get rid of his wife Angélique whose impulsive and impassioned character he cannot tolerate. His neighbour Charlot, an advertising agent, offers to put her up for sale, but the three resulting clients, an Italian, an Englishman and a Negro, are all rejected by Angélique, while two gossiping neighbours sympathise with each prospective partner. Angélique is finally thrust on the devil but he rejects her, saying that he has no room in hell for her. As Boniface in despair prepares to hang himself, Angélique throws herself at his feet, and all ends happily with a drinking chorus - except that after the curtain has fallen Boniface emerges to tell the audience that he still wants to sell her.

== Performance history ==
Angélique was performed 40 times in its first run. The work was mounted at the Opéra-Comique on 3 June 1930 with Maguy Gondy in the title role, Willy Tubiana as Boniface, Roger Bourdin as Charlot and Marcel Génio as the devil, with Albert Wolff conducting; it was revived in 1934 with Gustave Cloëz conducting, 1945 with Roger Désormière and Géori Boué in the title role, and in 1946 again under Cloëz. By 1948 there had been 1,000 performances around the world.

The first English performance was by the London Opera Club at the Fortune Theatre, produced by Geoffrey Dunn. A radio performance was given on BBC Radio 3 in April 1970 with the BBC Northern Orchestra conducted by Bryden Thomson with Teresa Cahill, Donald Francke, Lawrence Richard among the cast.

There have been two recordings issued, from 1954 with Géori Boué as Angélique, Lucien Lovano as Boniface, Roger Bourdin as Charlot, Pierre Gianotti as the italian and Jean Vieuille as the negro, with Tony Aubin conducting the R.T.F. Chorus and the Orchestre Radio Lyrique, on the LP Bourg 3010. A performance at the Teatro Massimo di Palermo in March 1996 with Gaëlle Méchaly as Angélique, Carmelo Caruso as Boniface, Luis Masson as Charlot, Bruce Fowler as the Italian, Max René Cosotti as the Englishman and Renzo Casellato as the devil, with Yoram David conducting the Teatro Massimo Chorus and Orchestra was issued on the CD Fonit Cetra NFCD 2038.
