= Andromeda Liberata =

Opera by multiple composers

Andromeda liberata is a pasticcio-serenata of 18 September 1726, on the subject of Perseus Freeing Andromeda, made as a collective tribute to the visiting Cardinal Pietro Ottoboni by at least five composers working in Venice including Vivaldi. It contains the last documented solo performance by Vivaldi as a violinist, performing the virtuoso violin part in his own aria "Sovente il sole". The work was re-assembled by Olivier Fourés and recorded by Andrea Marcon with Simone Kermes, Anna Bonitatibus and Max Emanuel Cenčić and the Venice Baroque Orchestra for Archiv in 2005.

== See also ==
- List of operas based on the Andromeda myth
