= Lex van Delden =

Dutch composer

Polygoon Film: Prize 1948 Amsterdam

Lex van Delden, born Alexander Zwaap (10 September 1919 – 1 July 1988) was a Dutch composer and the father of actor Lex van Delden.

== Early life and education ==
Born Alexander Zwaap in Amsterdam, the only child of Wolf Zwaap, a school-teacher, and his wife Sara Olivier, Lex van Delden took piano-lessons from an early age—first with Martha Zwaga, and later with Cor de Groot. He started composing at the age of eleven, when he set poems by Guido Gezelle to music since a long illness prevented him from playing the piano. He remained self-taught as a composer.

Despite his artistic promise and interests (by the age of fourteen, for instance, he was accompanying the famous German Expressionist dancer/choreographer, Gertrud Leistikow, and he also moved in the circle of one of Holland's foremost composers of the time, Sem Dresden) he enrolled at the University of Amsterdam in 1938 to study medicine and remained self-taught in music. Still a student, he made his début as a composer in 1940 with the song cycle L'amour (1939; for soprano, flute, clarinet and string trio), written at the request of the young composer/conductor Nico Richter, who was in charge of the students' orchestra.

== World War II ==
In 1940, the Germans invaded the Netherlands and in 1942, being a Jew, he was forced to interrupt his studies —irrevocably, as it turned out, because his hopes of becoming a neurosurgeon were dashed during World War II due to an exploding carbide lamp, which virtually blinded him in his left eye while in hiding. Van Delden soon joined the underground students' resistance movement and after the war was commended for his bravery by both the President of the United States of America and the Supreme Command of the Allied Forces. In 1953, the name he had assumed since the Liberation in 1945 (Lex van Delden—a derivation from the name he used in the resistance, W. A. van Dael) was officially approved.

By the time the war was over, Van Delden had lost nearly his entire family in the Holocaust. He almost immediately found his way into Dutch cultural life, partially through contacts he had made as a member of the resistance movement—initially as the resident composer/musical director of the first post-war Dutch ballet group, Op Vrije Voeten (On Liberated Feet), which later evolved into the Scapino Ballet Company, and, from 1947, as the music editor of the daily, originally underground, newspaper Het Parool.

== Musical career ==
The first of his works to attract wide attention was Rubáiyát (nine quatrains by Omar Khayyám in Edward FitzGerald's English translation, 1948; for chorus with soprano and tenor solos, 2 pianos and percussion), awarded the prestigious Music Prize of the City of Amsterdam in 1948. This unexpected success was soon to be confirmed by two First Prizes, awarded by the Northern California Harpists' Association, in 1953 for his Harp Concerto (1951–52), and in 1956 for Impromptu for harp solo (1955).

Van Delden was committed to the musical community, borne out by his readiness to hold several administrative posts, including the presidency of the Society of Dutch Composers (GeNeCo) and the chairmanship of the Dutch Performing Right Organisation (Buma/Stemra). He sat on the Board of the International Society for Contemporary Music (I.S.C.M.) and was a member of the Dutch Committee of the International Music Council.

Throughout the 1950s and 1960s, van Delden became one of the most widely heard Dutch composers of his generation, and a large number of his pieces were commissioned (by the Dutch government, the City of Amsterdam, Dutch radio and others) and enjoyed acclaimed performances by the Amsterdam Concertgebouw Orchestra under such renowned conductors as George Szell, Charles Münch, Eduard van Beinum, Eugen Jochum, Willem van Otterloo, and Bernard Haitink, and by numerous other prominent ensembles and soloists.

He was made a Knight of the Royal Order of Oranje-Nassau (1972), and received the Freedom of the City of Amsterdam (1982), where he died on 1 July 1988. He is buried at Zorgvlied cemetery. A new bridge in the Amsterdam Zuidas quarter (designed by architect Liesbeth van der Pol) was named after him; the bridge was officially opened on 15 October 2013.

=== Themes ===
Many of Van Delden's compositions form an expression of his deeply felt social concern, such as the orchestral work In Memoriam (1953), which was written in the aftermath of the great flood disaster of 1953 in the Netherlands, Belgium and England, the oratorio The Bird of Freedom (1955), which is an emotional cry against slavery, the radiophonic oratorio Icarus (1962), which questions the usefulness of space travel, or Canto della guerra (after Erasmus, 1967; for chorus and orchestra), which is a strong condemnation of war. A few of his works have biblical themes, notably Judith (1950; a dance score for flute, clarinet, piano and string trio) and Adonijah's Death (1986; for male chorus and symphonic wind band).

Lex van Delden loved working closely with performers, too, utilising to the full the peculiarities and possibilities specific to the instruments as well as meeting the wishes and demands of the players. If he felt at all consciously influenced by any predecessors, it was perhaps by such old Dutch Masters as Jan Pieterszoon Sweelinck, whose solid constructivism certainly contributed to his own highly developed grasp of form.
