= Antonello Allemandi =

Italian conductor

- Born: 20 March 1957 (age 69); Milan, Italy
- Genres: Opera, classical music
- Occupation: Conductor
- Years active: 1970s–present

Antonello Allemandi (born 20 March 1957) is an Italian conductor, particularly associated with opera and the Italian bel canto repertoire. He has conducted at major international opera houses including the Metropolitan Opera, La Scala, Royal Opera House, Vienna State Opera, Paris Opera, Deutsche Oper Berlin, Bavarian State Opera, Teatro Real, Bolshoi Theatre and New National Theatre Tokyo.

From 1992 to 1997 he was music director of the Orchestre Colonne in Paris.

== Early life and education ==
Allemandi was born in Milan, Italy, in 1957. He studied piano, composition and conducting at the Giuseppe Verdi Conservatory in Milan, where his teachers included Paolo Bordoni for piano, Azio Corghi for composition and Gianluigi Gelmetti for conducting.

He subsequently continued his musical studies at the Mozarteum University Salzburg and the Accademia Musicale Chigiana in Siena. He also studied at the Tanglewood Music Center in Massachusetts, where he worked with Leonard Bernstein and Seiji Ozawa.

Allemandi made his conducting debut at the Maggio Musicale Fiorentino while still a young conductor.

== Career ==
Allemandi developed an international career principally as an opera conductor. His engagements have included appearances at the Metropolitan Opera in New York, Royal Opera House in London, Vienna State Opera, La Scala in Milan, Paris Opera, Deutsche Oper Berlin, Bavarian State Opera in Munich, Zürich Opera House, Teatro Real in Madrid, Gran Teatre del Liceu in Barcelona, the Bolshoi Theatre in Moscow and the New National Theatre Tokyo.

He has also conducted at festivals including the Rossini Opera Festival in Pesaro and the Festival Verdi in Parma.

From 1992 until 1997, Allemandi served as music director of the Orchestre Colonne in Paris, succeeding Pierre Dervaux. He was succeeded by Laurent Petitgirard.

His symphonic work has included performances with the Orchestra dell'Accademia Nazionale di Santa Cecilia, the Nouvel Orchestre Philharmonique de Radio France, the Ensemble Orchestral de Paris, the Orchestre national de Lille, the Monte-Carlo Philharmonic Orchestra and orchestras of RAI.

=== Opera ===
Allemandi's operatic repertoire is particularly associated with nineteenth-century Italian opera and the bel canto tradition. He has conducted works by Gioachino Rossini, Gaetano Donizetti, Vincenzo Bellini, Giuseppe Verdi and Giacomo Puccini, as well as operas by Wolfgang Amadeus Mozart and composers of the French repertoire.

His Rossini repertoire has included Il barbiere di Siviglia, La Cenerentola, Semiramide and Guillaume Tell. His Donizetti repertoire includes Lucia di Lammermoor, L'elisir d'amore, La fille du régiment and La favorite, while his Bellini repertoire includes La sonnambula.

At the Bavarian State Opera, he has conducted productions including Rossini's Semiramide, Guillaume Tell and La Cenerentola, as well as Verdi's Il trovatore.

Allemandi made his Metropolitan Opera debut on 8 October 2005, conducting Rossini's La Cenerentola. The cast included Olga Borodina, Barry Banks, Simone Alberghini and Ildar Abdrazakov.

In the 2020s his engagements have continued to include Italian and French opera, including performances of Verdi's Simon Boccanegra, Puccini's Tosca, Verdi's Falstaff and works by Rossini.

He has also served as principal guest conductor of the Grand Theatre, Poznań.

In January 2026, Allemandi joined IMG Artists for worldwide general management.

== Recordings ==
Allemandi has conducted a number of commercial opera recordings. His discography includes Gaetano Donizetti's Francesca di Foix, recorded for Opera Rara with Annick Massis, Jennifer Larmore, Bruce Ford and Pietro Spagnoli.

He also conducted Rossini's Il turco in Italia at the Rossini Opera Festival in Pesaro in a production subsequently released on video, with the Orchestra Haydn di Bolzano e Trento and the Prague Chamber Chorus.

His recorded repertoire also includes works by Donizetti, Verdi and Saverio Mercadante.

== Honours ==
In 2003 Allemandi received the gold medal of the Asociación Bilbaína de Amigos de la Ópera (ABAO) in Bilbao in recognition of his contribution to the organisation and to opera.
