= Divertissement (Ibert) =

Suite for chamber orchestra

Jacques Ibert's Divertissement is a six-movement suite for chamber orchestra adapted by the composer in 1930 from incidental music he had written for a production of Eugène Labiche's stage comedy The Italian Straw Hat in 1929. It is among Ibert's best-known works and has been recorded many times.

== Background and premiere ==
In the decade after the First World War, Jacques Ibert established himself as a leading French composer, winning France's top musical prize, the Prix de Rome and becoming known to a large public for compositions such as La Ballade de la geôle de Reading (a symphonic poem based on Oscar Wilde's The Ballad of Reading Gaol) and Escales (Ports of Call, an orchestral representation of a Mediterranean sea voyage). In 1929 he composed incidental music for a revival of Eugène Labiche's 1851 stage comedy Un Chapeau de paille d'Italie (The Italian Straw Hat) at the Théatre d'Amsterdam. The following year he arranged the score into a six-movement divertissement for small orchestra. The premiere was given at the Salle Pleyel by the Orchestre symphonique de Paris on 30 November 1930, conducted by Vladimir Golschmann.

The music critic of Le Figaro wrote after the premiere:

This little entertainment … may be only a pochade, (Note: The Dictionnaire de l'Académie Française defines a pochade in this sense as "a literary or musical work quickly composed, lively and full of fantasy, which retains the character of a sketch".) but composed with what talent, with what naturalness! ... All [the six movements] are equally full of wit, parody and rhythmic invention combined for our pleasure with the talent of an infallible juggler of timbres, using only a few instruments, but combining them with a truly dazzling fantasy. Unexpected encounters, hilarious quotations, allusions that make people laugh, pepper this little work. richer in musical pleasure than many more ambitious scores.

== Score ==
The suite is scored for flute (doubling piccolo), clarinet, bassoon (doubling contrabassoon), French horn, trumpet, trombone, timpani, snare drum, wood block, cymbals, bass drum, tambourine, tam-tam, whistle, piano (doubling celesta) and strings. The home key of all six movements is C major.

I Introduction Allegro vivo = 92
II Cortège Moderato molto = 69 – Animato subito = 126 – Allegro moderato = 112 – Animato subito = 126
III Nocturne Lento = 63
IV Valse Animato assai = 96 – Tempo di Valze . = 60 – Poco più animato . = 72– Vivo molto = 144
V Parade Tempo di marcia = 120
VI Finale Quasi cadenza = 100–112 – Vivo (Tempo di galop) = 168

== Style ==
Ibert was a friend of two of the members of Les six – Darius Milhaud and Arthur Honegger, but his music generally had little in common with theirs or that of their fellow group members. The musical scholar Roger Nichols writes that in Divertissement, Ibert comes closer than usual to their style:

The "Introduction" gives some of the flavour of the whole: jaunty melodic tags, brilliant orchestration, rhythms that tease and entertain. But in "Cortège" and "Nocturne" we also find touches of the poetic Ibert, albeit, in "Cortège", with interruptions, including some from a well-known wedding march. (Note: The wedding march in question is Mendelssohn's from his incidental music for A Midsummer Night's Dream.) The "Valse" perhaps looks back to the "noble and sentimental" examples by his friend Ravel, though with splendidly vulgar brass additions, while in "Parade" the vulgarity extends to the tunes. In the "Finale", after an attempt to destroy the piano, a whistle reminds us that Labiche's crazy play ends up in a police station.

The composer Michael Ippolito comments that in between the frivolity Ibert offers "a delicately crafted Nocturne that seduces us with atmosphere and sonority, showing an incredible ear for orchestral colour, especially considering the small ensemble".

== Recordings ==
According to the conductor Richard Auldon Clark, Divertissement is "undoubtedly Ibert's best-known composition", and it has received many recordings.

Orchestra	Conductor	Year
Winterthur	Henry Swoboda	1950
Paris Conservatoire	Roger Désormière	1951
Hallé	Sir John Barbirolli	1954
Concert Arts	Felix Slatkin	1954
Boston Pops	Arthur Fiedler	1957
Paris Conservatoire	Jean Martinon	1960
MGM	Carlos Surinach	1960
Philadelphia	Eugene Ormandy	1963
City of Birmingham Symphony	Louis Frémaux	1974
CBC Radio	Mario Bernardi	1982
Academy of St Martin in the Fields	Neville Marriner	1982
Montreal Symphony	Charles Dutoit	1989
Ulster	Yan Pascal Tortelier	1992
Cincinnati Pops	Erich Kunzel	1992
Tapiola Sinfonietta	Paavo Järvi	1993
Dallas Symphony	Eduardo Mata	1994
Manhattan Chamber	Richard Auldon Clark	1996
Lamoureux	Yutaka Sado	2000
London Chamber	Christopher Warren-Green	2011
Svizzera Italiana	Howard Griffiths	2013
Suisse Romande	Neeme Järvi	2016

Source: WorldCat and Naxos Music Library

== Notes, references and sources ==
=== Sources ===
- Clark, Richard Auldon (1996). Jacques Ibert: Oeuvres variées. Providence: Newport Classic. OCLC 1406916546.
- Ippolito, Michael (2021). Divertissement. Åkersberga: BIS. OCLC 1263176588.
- Michel, Gérard (1967). Jacques Ibert (in French). Paris: Seghers. OCLC 988850.\
- Nichols, Roger (2016). Ibert: Orchestral Works. Colchester: Chandos. OCLC 968245785.
