= Gaëlle Méchaly =

French opera singer (born 1970)

Gaëlle Méchaly (born 15 June 1970) is a soprano. In 2001, she reached the finals of the BBC Cardiff Singer of the World. Méchaly has been a regular member of a Baroque ensemble, Les Arts Florissants and has appeared in many operatic productions directed by William Christie. The recording of Zoroastre was short-listed for a Grammy Award in 2003.

== Biography ==
Méchaly was born in Marseille, France in 1970. She has a younger brother, Nathaniel Méchaly, who is also a musician and a composer of film scores. They have collaborated on a number of projects during their careers.

== Career ==
Méchaly trained as a classical singer at the Conservatoire National de Région in Marseille. She has subsequently performed internationally, and contributed to many recordings, ranging from Baroque to contemporary music and film soundtracks. Méchaly made her debut at the Opera de Marseille. In 1993, she won the jury special prize at the Concours International d'Oratorio et de Lied de Clermont-Ferrand, and in 1994 she won the Grand Prix Henri Sauguet and the Prix de La SACEM for 20th-century music.

During her career Méchaly has performed in leading operatic roles on many occasions with William Christie, and his Baroque music ensemble, Les Arts Florissants. Several of these performances were recorded, and released as albums. A review of Christie's 1997 recording of Rameau's Hippolyte et Aricie noted the brilliant intensity of Méchaly's voice, performing as "L'Amour". A reviewer wrote of her performance as Angélique in the eponymous work by Jacques Ibert "Gaëlle Méchaly’s light and flexible soprano is just right for the terrifying main role". In 2003, her live concert performance as Amélite, in Rameau's Zoroastre, conducted by Christie at the Edinburgh Festival was described as "delightfully vulnerable". This recording of Zoroastre was nominated for a GRAMMY for Best Opera Recording in 2004.

In 2001, Méchaly appeared in the finals of the BBC Cardiff Singer of the World competition, where she performed works by Mozart, Bizet and Donizzetti. She was only the sixth French contestant to reach this stage of the competition since 1991.

In 2010, she sang at the premiere of Kaija Saariaho's Tempest Songbook in Orleans, France. In 2023 and 2024, Mechaly has performed a Renaissance, Baroque and contemporary repertoire of "fantasies and love songs of yesterday and today" with the ensemble TM+, under the direction of Laurent Cuniot, cellist David Simpson and viola da gamba player Silvia Lenzi.

Méchaly has contributed to numerous soundtracks to films and television series, in particular in collaborations with her brother, composer Nicholas Méchaly. Notable examples include the soundtracks to Colombiana (2011), Taken 3 (2014) and Midnight Sun (2016).

== Selected recordings ==
=== Classical albums ===
- Purcell: Dido and Aeneas, Véronique Gens, Nathan Berg, Sophie Marin-Degor, Claire Brua, Sophie Daneman, Gaëlle Méchaly, Les Arts Florissants and William Christie. Erato 4509984772 (1995).
- Ibert: Angélique, Carmelo Caruso, Gaëlle Méchaly, Bruce Fowler; Palermo Teatro Massimo Chorus & Orchestra, led by Yoram David. Warner Fonit, 8573-83513-2 (1997).
- Joseph Bodin de Boismortier: Daphnis et Chloé, Hervé Niquet, Till Fechner, François-Nicolas Geslot, Gaëlle Méchaly. Recorded at the Grande Salle, Arsenal de Metz, France. (December 2001). Glossa 921618
- Rameau: Zoroastre, William Christie & Les Arts Florissants, Erato /Warner Classics 0927 43182-2 (2003).
- Rameau: Zephyre La Guirlande William Christie & Les Arts Florissants, Erato/Warner Classics 8573-857742 (2001)

=== Albums ===
- Sortilèges et carafons (2014) A lyrical fantasy. Artistic director Natalie Dessay. Gaëlle Méchaly and Ezequiel Spucches.
- Poèmes Vol.1 (2020) Paul Fargier & Gaëlle Méchaly, Passeur de Mots
- Les Fleurs du Mal de Charles Baudelaire, vol. 1 (2023) Paul Fargier, Daniel Mesguich, Gaëlle Mechaly, Passeur de Mots.

=== Film and TV soundtracks ===
- Not Afraid, Not Afraid (2000), soundtrack by Gabriel Yared.
- The Black Box (2005), soundtrack by Nathaniel Méchaly.
- Colombiana (2011) soundtrack by Nathaniel Méchaly.
- Taken 3 (2014), soundtrack by Nathaniel Méchaly, "Let me weep".
- Midnight Sun (2016), soundtrack by Nathaniel Méchaly, "A Sami Lullaby" featuring Méchaly.
