= Annick Massis =

French operatic soprano (born 1958)

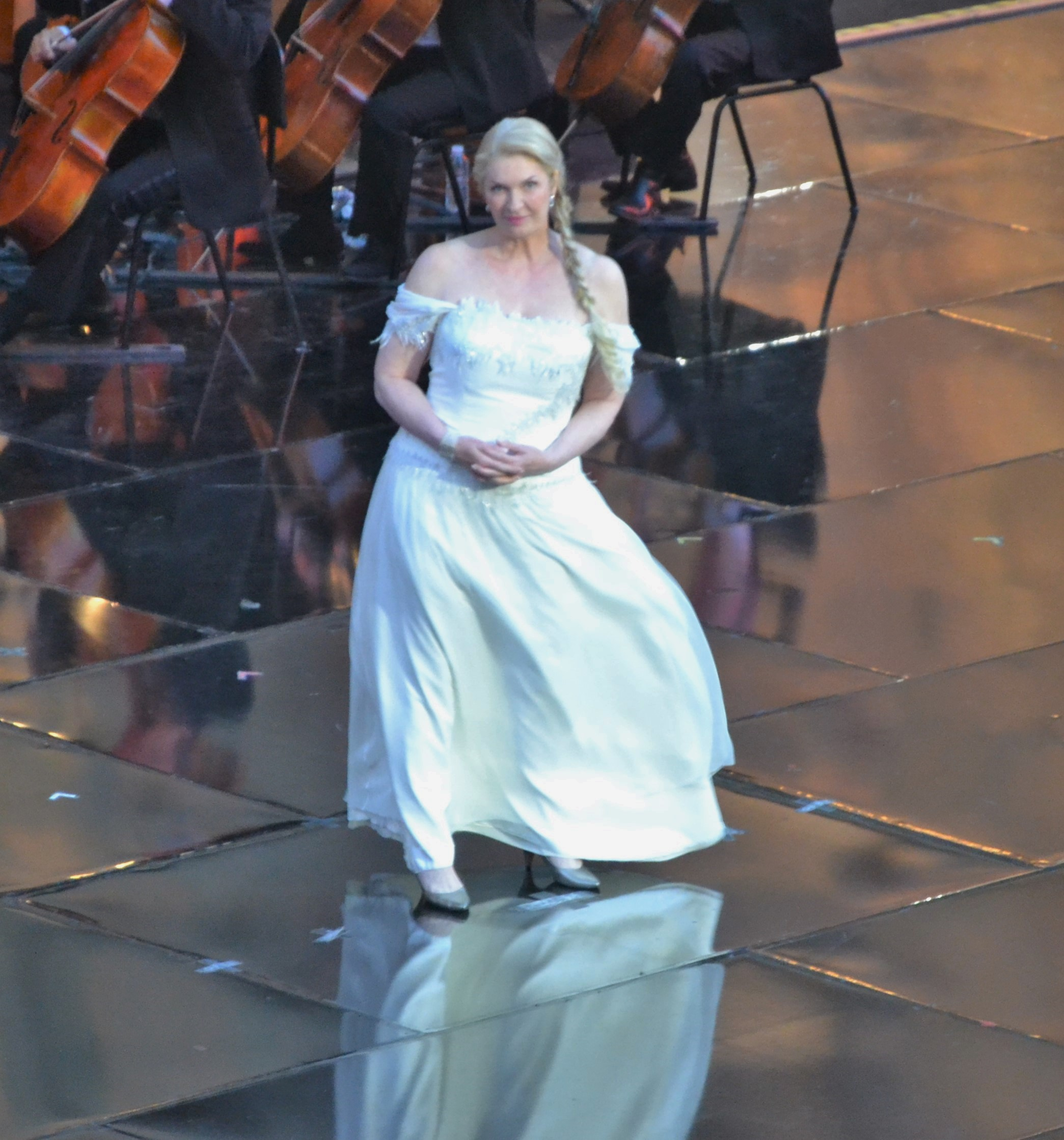
- Massis at 2015 Musique en Fête in Orange
- Born: Annick, Armelle, Jacqueline Dubreuil; 31 January 1958 (age 68); Paris, France
- Occupation: Operatic soprano
- Years active: 1991–present
- Awards: Ordre des Arts et des Lettres
- Website: www.annickmassis.com

Annick Massis (born Jacqueline Dubreuil; French: [a.nik ma.sis]; born 31 January 1958) is a French operatic soprano whose career is primarily based in Europe. She performed roles from various classical music eras, spanning from baroque, operas by Mozart, to 19th-century Italian and French repertoire.

== Biography ==
Jacqueline Dubreuil was born in the 15th arrondissement of Paris, to singer parents: mother specialising in operetta, father being a baritone in the Choir of Radio France. After obtaining double degree in history and English, she worked as a school teacher till 28, during which she took masterclasses and met her teacher Isabel Garcisanz. Two years later, Gabriel Dussurget, founder of the Aix-en-Provence Festival, introduced her to conductor Bernard Thomas, who engaged her in Great Mass in C minor and the entire oratorio repertoire after a simple audition. Her stage career began at the Théâtre du Capitole in Toulouse in 1991, and in the same season she performed in Mozart's La finta giardiniera as the title role at the Opéra de Nantes, which brought her to public attention. Other Mozart performances included Requiem, Exsultate, jubilate. She performed in Blonde in Die Entführung aus dem Serail at the Festival de Castres, after which she entered the Conservatoire Francis Poulenc in Paris and obtained the First Prize in singing in two years.

In 1992, she performed Philine in Mignon at the Théâtre Impérial de Compiègne. In 1994, she made her Paris Opera debut as Barbarina in The Marriage of Figaro at the Opéra Bastille. In 1995, she performed the role of Cunégonde in the first-ever French adaption of Bernstein's Candide, which premiered at the Opéra de Saint-Étienne and traveled to the Opéra Royal de Wallonie. In 1996, she participated in a new production of Hippolyte et Aricie under William Christie at the Palais Garnier.

Massis debuted at the Glyndebourne Festival in 1997 with Le comte Ory, embarking her international career. In 1997/98, she starred in Laurent Pelly's new production of Orphée aux enfers, opening the season, and performed Marie in La fille du régiment at the Grand Théâtre de Genève. In 1998, she stepped in for Ruth Ann Swenson at short notice as Ophélie in Hamlet at the Washington Concert Opera, followed by Lucia di Lammermoor and her first Leïla in Bizet's Les pêcheurs de perles in Toulouse.

The year 1999 saw her role debut as Elvira in I puritani at the Opéra d'Avignon, and her US debut with two performances of Lucia di Lammermoor at Staten Island and in New Jersey with Metropolitan Opera Orchestra, followed by the same role in Toulouse. She made her official Metropolitan Opera stage debut as Lucia in 2002. In October 1999, she performed in a concert performance of I Capuleti e i Montecchi at Avery Fisher Hall with the Opera Orchestra of New York. In 2000, she made her Liceu debut with Lucia. In 2004, she debuted as Violetta in La traviata at the Pittsburgh Opera. In December 2005, she made her Vienna State Opera debut with Lucia, and returned in the next season for Juliette and Violetta. In 2009, Annick Massis sang all four major soprano roles in a production of The Tales of Hoffmann at the Opéra de Nice.

In 2007, she performed Eudoxie in Pierre Audi's new production of La Juive at the Opéra Bastille. Later in the year, she returned to the Metropolitan Opera for Lucia di Lammermoor, sharing the title role with Natalie Dessay in Mary Zimmerman's new production.

In the 2013/14 season at the Liceu, she portrayed the Fairy in Massenet's Cendrillon alongside Joyce DiDonato, and subsequently performed in La sonnambula.

In 2016, Massis debuted in the title role in Maria Stuarda in concert form at the Opéra de Marseille, and then at the Opéra de Monte-Carlo.

In 2019 she performed Mithilde in the critically acclaimed Guillaume Tell in July at the Chorégies d'Orange.

== Awards ==
Massis was named Chevalier of the Ordre des Arts et des Lettres in 2007. In the same year, she was awarded Siola d'oro Award.

== Discography ==
=== Complete operas ===
CD

- Bizet: Les pêcheurs de perles, Orchestra del Teatro La Fenice, Marcello Viotti, Dynamic
- Boïeldieu: La dame blanche, Ensemble Orchestral de Paris, Marc Minkowski, EMI
- Donizetti: Elvida, London Philharmonic Orchestra, Antonello Allemandi, Opera Rara
- Donizetti: Francesca di Foix, London Philharmonic Orchestra, Antonello Allemandi, Opera Rara
- Ibert: Persée et Andromède, Orchestre Philharmonique de Strasbourg, Jan Latham-Koenig, Avie
- Händel: La resurrezione, Les Musiciens du Louvre, Marc Minkowski, Archiv
- Meyerbeer: Margherita d'Anjou, London Philharmonic Orchestra, David Parry, Opera Rara
- Mozart: Lucio Silla, Orchestra del Teatro La Fenice, Tomas Netopil, Dynamic
- Pacini: Paventa Insano, London Philharmonic Orchestra, dir. David Parry, Opera Rara
- Rameau: Anacréon, Les Musiciens du Louvre, Marc Minkowski, Archiv
- Rossini: Matilde di Shabran, Orquesta Sinfonica de Galicia, Riccardo Frizza, Decca
- Rossini: L'inganno felice, Le Concert des Tuileries, Marc Minkowski, Erato
- Thomas: Mignon, Ensemble Orchestral Harmonia Nova, Stéphane Denève, Accord

DVD

- Mozart: Lucio Silla, Orchestra del Teatro La Fenice, Tomas Netopil, Dynamic
- Bizet: Les pêcheurs de perles, Orchestra del Teatro La Fenice, Marcello Viotti, Dynamic
- Rossini: Le comte Ory, London Philharmonic Orchestra, Andrew Davis, NVC Arts
