= Lex van Delden (actor) =

Dutch actor and singer

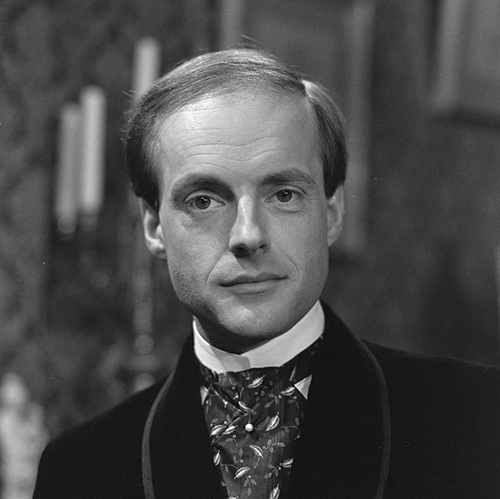
- van Delden as Robert van Maeren in the television play Noodlot, 1981
- Born: Alexander Zwaap; 21 June 1947; Amsterdam
- Died: 6 October 2010 (aged 63); Amsterdam

Lex van Delden (born Alexander Zwaap; 21 June 1947 – 6 October 2010) was a Dutch actor and singer. His film credits include A Bridge Too Far, Soldier of Orange and Bad Timing. He is the son of composer Lex van Delden.

== Filmography ==
Year	Title	Role	Notes
1973	Robin Hood	Robin Hood	
1975	The Hiding Place	Young German Officer Max	
1977	A Bridge Too Far	Sergeant Matthias	
1977	Soldier of Orange	Nico	
1978	Mysteries	Student	
1980	Bad Timing	Young Doctor	
1983	Auf Wiedersehen, Pet	Helmut	
1984	Coming Out of the Ice	gevangene	
1984	To Catch A King	Hans Egger	
1985	Revolution	Pierre	
1988	John & Yoko – A Love Story	reporter	
1988	Soursweet	Guillaume	
1997	Incognito	Prof. de Hoog	
1997	Phoenix	Dr. Jan Randell	
2003	The Reckoning	ober (Satan)	
2006	Helix	Max Randell	
