= Persée (Philidor) =

Tragédie lyrique by François-André Danican Philidor

- Tragédie lyrique by François-André Danican Philidor
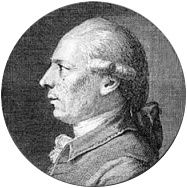
- Portrait of Philidor, London, 1777
- Librettist: Jean-François Marmontel
- Language: French
- Based on: Philippe Quinault's libretto for Persée
- Premiere: 27 October 1780; Académie Royale de Musique, Paris

Persée (Perseus) is an opera by the French composer François-André Danican Philidor first performed at the Académie Royale de Musique, Paris (the Paris Opera) on 27 October 1780. It takes the form of a tragédie lyrique in three acts. The text is a reworking, by Jean-François Marmontel, of a libretto by Philippe Quinault, originally set by Jean-Baptiste Lully in 1682. Philidor's version was not a success.

== Roles ==
Role	Voice type	Premiere cast
Céphée (Cepheus), King of Ethiopia	basse-taille (bass-baritone)	Moreau
Cassiope (Cassiopeia), wife of Céphée	soprano	Françoise-Claude-Marie-Rosalie Campagne (called Mlle Duplant)
Andromède (Andromeda), daughter of Céphée and Cassiope	soprano	Rosalie Levasseur
Persée (Perseus), son of Jupiter	haute-contre	Joseph Legros
Phinée, prince of Ethiopia	bass-baritone	Henri Larrivée
Mercure (the god Mercury)	tenor	Étienne Lainez
Méduse Medusa, a Gorgon	soprano	Mlle Duranci (also spelled Durancy)
Euryale, a Gorgon (travesti)	haute-contre	Jean-Joseph Rousseau
Stenone, a Gorgon (travesti)	?	Perré
Orcas, an Ethiopian	bass-baritone	Auguste-Athanase (Augustin) Chéron
Proténor, an Ethiopian	taille (bari-tenor)	François Laïs (or Lays)
Un cyclope (a cyclops)	bass-baritone	Durand
A Triton	?	Perré
Vénus (the goddess Venus)	soprano	Châteauvieux
Une nymphe guerrière (a warrior nymph)	soprano	Suzanne Joinville

== Sources ==
- (in French) Félix Clément and Pierre Larousse Dictionnaire des Opéras, p.525.
- (in French) Original libretto on Gallica BNF

== See also ==
- List of operas based on the Andromeda myth
