= Vladimir Golschmann =

French and American conductor (1893–1972)

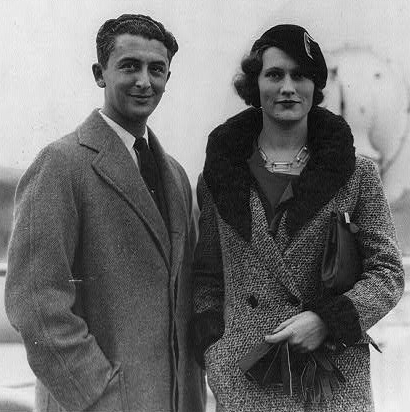
Vladimir Golschmann with his wife in the 1920s

Vladimir Golschmann (16 December 1893 – 1 March 1972) was a French and American conductor.

== Biography ==
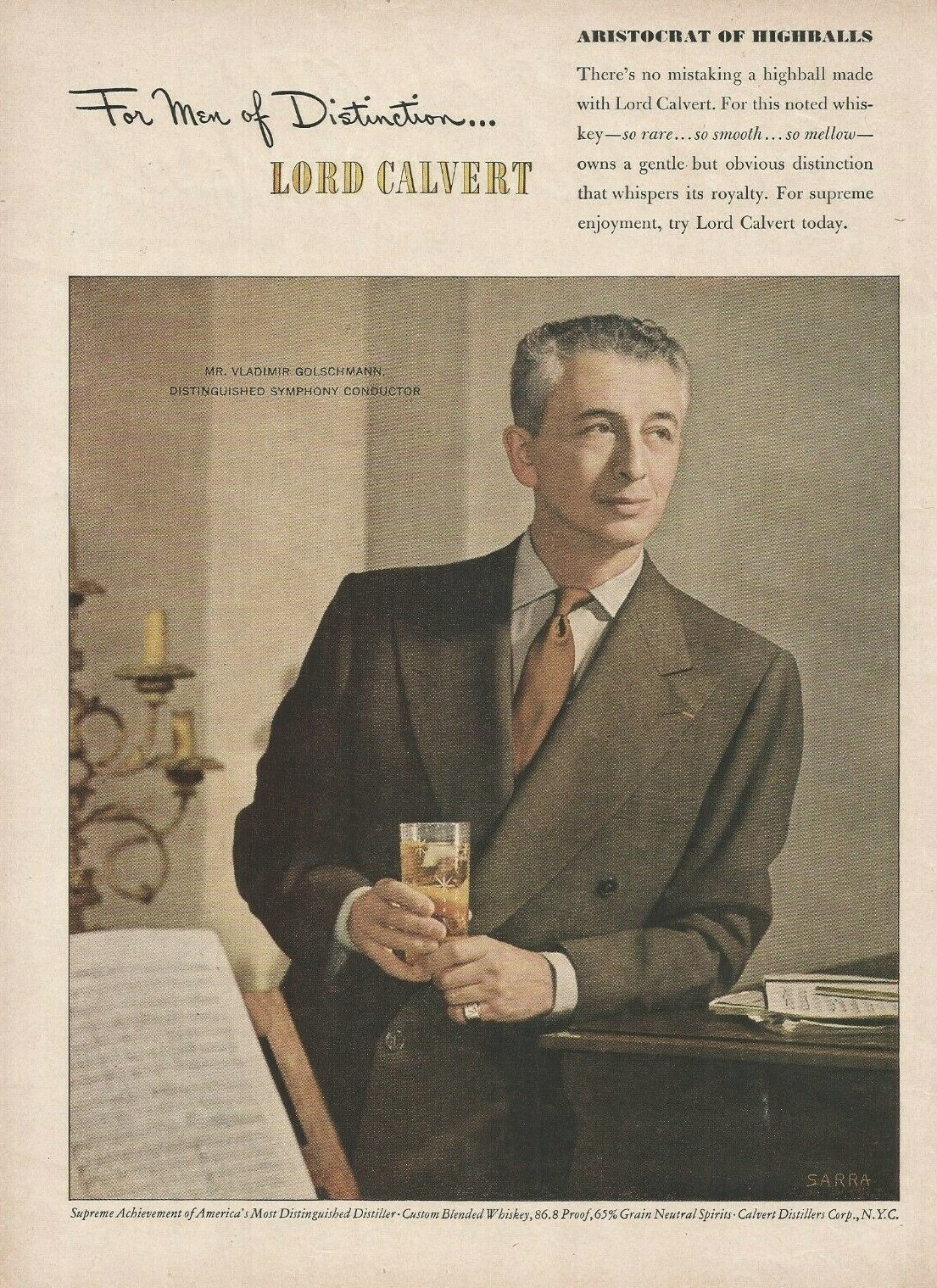
Vladimir Golschmann in 1948 (Lord Calvert ad)

Vladimir Golschmann was born in Paris to a Jewish family. He studied violin at the Schola Cantorum in Paris. He was a notable advocate of the music of the composers known as Les Six. In Paris, he had his own concert series, the Concerts Golschmann, which began in 1919. He became the director of music activities at the Sorbonne, at the behest of the French government. Golschmann also conducted performances at the Ballets Russes of Sergei Diaghilev.

Golschmann was the music director of the Saint Louis Symphony Orchestra (SLSO) from 1931 to 1958, their longest-serving music director. His initial contract was for 3 years, and the successive contracts were renewed yearly. For the last three years of his tenure, he was named conductor emeritus, during their search for a successor music director. He was initiated as an honorary member of the New Zeta chapter of Phi Mu Alpha Sinfonia music fraternity in 1949. Golschmann remained in the US, becoming a citizen in 1957.

In 1957 Golschmann joined forces with a young Glenn Gould and the Columbia Symphony Orchestra to record Ludwig van Beethoven's Piano Concerto No. 1 in C major, Op. 15 and Johann Sebastian Bach's Concerto No. 5 in F minor, BWV 1056 for Columbia Masterworks (ML 5298, 1958).

In his later years, Golschmann also worked with the orchestras of Tulsa and Denver. He died in New York City.

== Premieres ==
Golschmann conducted several world premieres, including, all in Paris except the last:

- Le bœuf sur le toit, ballet by Darius Milhaud, Comédie des Champs-Élysées, 1920
- Pastorale d'été by Arthur Honegger, Salle Gaveau, 1921
- La belle excentrique, suite by Erik Satie, Théâtre du Colisée, 1921
- El retablo de Maese Pedro by Manuel de Falla, palace of the Princesse de Polignac, 1923
- La création du monde, ballet by Darius Milhaud, Théâtre des Champs-Élysées, 1923
- Divertissement, by Jacques Ibert, Salle Pleyel, 1930
- Suite Française, by Maurice Jaubert, Saint-Louis
- Violin Concerto by Robert Schumann (original version), with Yehudi Menuhin, 1937
- Violin Concerto by Erich Wolfgang Korngold with Jascha Heifetz, Saint Louis, 1947.

Source: Dictionnaire des interprètes et de l’interprétation musicale au XXe siècle.

== Recordings ==
External audio
- You may hear Vladimir Golschmann with the Columbia Symphony Orchestra and Glenn Gould in: Ludwig van Beethoven's Piano Concerto No.1 in C major, Op. 15; Johann Sebastian Bach's Keyboard Concerto No. 5 in F minor, BWV 1056 in 1958; Here on archive.org
- You may hear Vladimir Golschmann with the Columbia Symphony Orchestra and Glenn Gould in Johann Sebastian Bach's: Keyboard Concerto No. 2 in E major, BWV 1053; Keyboard Concerto No. 4 in A major, BWV 1055 in 1969 Here on Archive.org

- Johann Sebastian Bach: Keyboard Concerti Nos 2–5, 7 with Glenn Gould / Columbia Symphony Orchestra
- Samuel Barber: Music for a Scene from Shelley, Second Essay with the Symphony of the Air
- Béla Bartók: Piano Concerto No. 3 with Leonard Pennario / SLSO
- Hector Berlioz: Symphonie fantastique with the Vienna State Opera Orchestra
- César Franck: Symphony in D minor with the SLSO
- Sergei Prokofiev: Piano Concerto No. 3 with Leonard Pennario / SLSO
- Sergei Rachmaninoff: Piano Concerto No. 2 with Leonard Pennario / SLSO
- Arnold Schoenberg: Verklärte Nacht, with the SLSO recorded 1945
- Dmitri Shostakovich: Symphony No. 5 with the SLSO
- Pyotr Ilyich Tchaikovsky: Romeo and Juliet fantasy-overture, Francesca da Rimini with the SLSO
- Roy Harris: Folksong Symphony with the American Festival Chorus and Orchestra
- "Modern French Music", a circa 1950 Long playing record, Capitol Records, P8244. On this recording he conducted the Concert Arts Orchestra. The program was Honegger: Pastorale d'été; Milhaud: Le bœuf sur le toit; Satie: Three Gymnopédies; Ravel: Le tombeau de Couperin.
- "Nights in the Gardens of Spain", 1958 Long playing record, RCA Victor, LM1091. Arthur Rubinstein piano; St. Louis Symphony Orchestra. de Falla: Noches en los jardines de España ("Nights in the Gardens of Spain"); Wolfgang Amadeus Mozart: Piano Concerto No. 23.

== Sources ==
- Pâris, Alain (1995). Dictionnaire des interprètes et de l'interprétation musicale au XXe siècle (in French) (fourth ed.). Paris: Laffont. ISBN 978-2-22-108064-1.
