= Pastorale d'été (Honegger) =

Symphony poem by Arthur Honegger

- Symphonic poem by Arthur Honegger
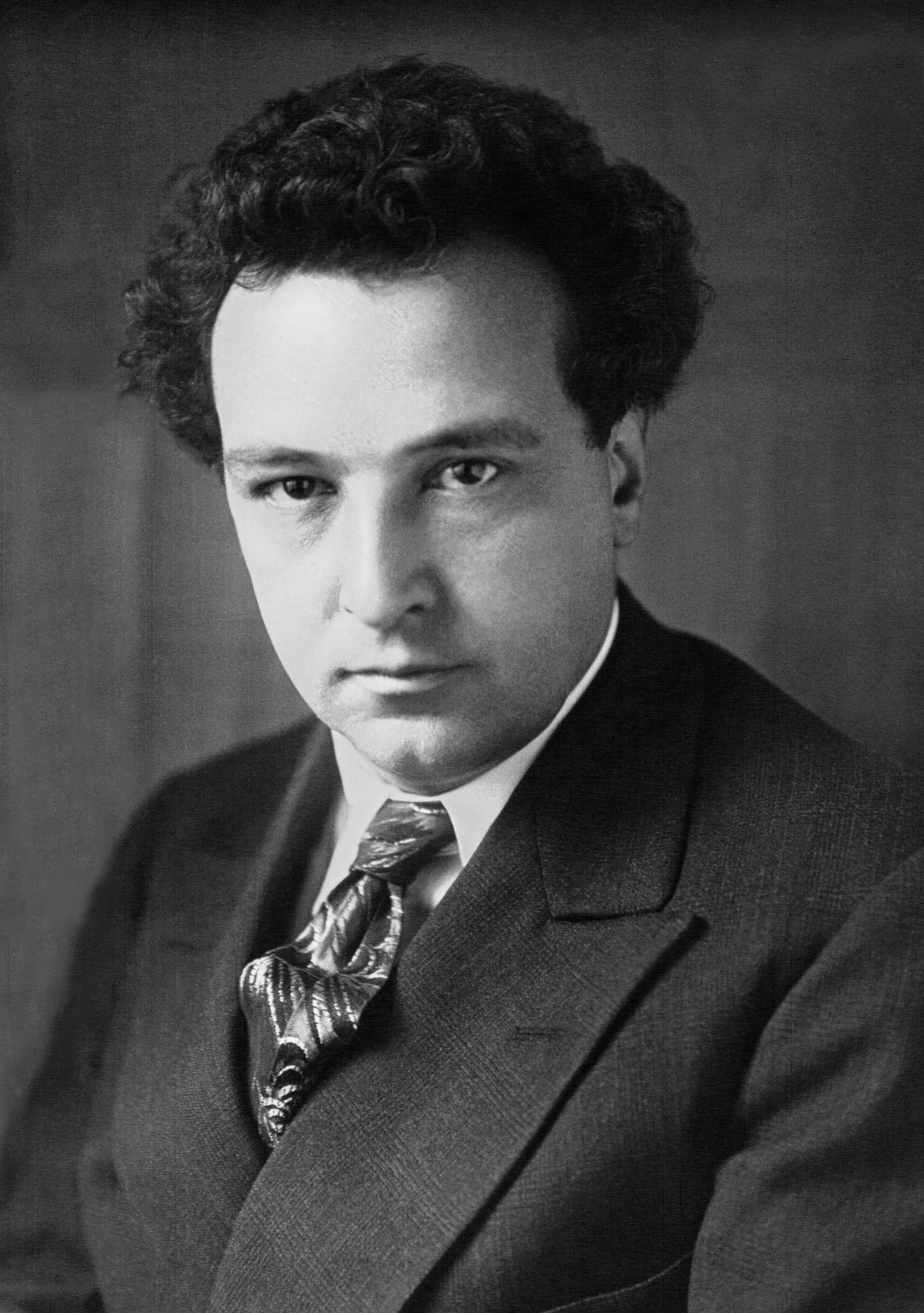
- The composer in 1928
- English: Summer Pastoral
- Catalogue: H. 31
- Composed: 1920: Wengen
- Performed: 17 February 1921: Paris
- Scoring: Chamber orchestra

Pastorale d’été, H. 31 (Summer Pastoral), is a short symphonic poem for chamber orchestra by Arthur Honegger. It was inspired by Honegger's vacation in the Swiss alps above Bern in 1920 and lasts seven or eight minutes.

Pastorale d'été was written in August 1920 at Wengen in Switzerland. It was Honegger's first orchestral work of any real consequence before he wrote his massive Horace victorieux, which he wrote in the winter of 1920-21.

The score of Pastorale d'été was inscribed with an epigraph by Arthur Rimbaud: J'ai embrassé l'aube d'été (I have embraced the summer dawn). The scoring is for strings, single woodwinds, and horn. The work is atmospheric, placid and restrained, and has been described as "a latter-day Prélude à l'après-midi d'un faune (Prelude to the Afternoon of a Faun by Claude Debussy). It seems to be a musical impression of a peaceful early morning in the Swiss alps. It opens with a languorous soaring theme on the horn, which is then taken up by the strings. The instrumentation matches the pastoral nature of the theme and the mood in the outer sections. The middle section is more lively and is colourfully orchestrated. The main theme returns to close the piece in the same peaceful, manner of the opening. The work was dedicated to Alexis Roland-Manuel.

It was first performed on 17 February 1921 at the Salle Gaveau in Paris, conducted by Vladimir Golschmann. The work won a Prix Verley, a prize decided by the audience members.

The first British concert performance was on 27 October 1921 conducted by Eugene Goossens in the Queen's Hall, London.

The work has entered the general orchestral repertoire, and has often been played in concert. Honegger conducted a recording of the work himself, as have Hermann Scherchen, Jean Martinon (1971), Michel Plasson (1991), Leonard Bernstein, David Zinman, Thierry Fischer, Charles Dutoit and many others.

As part of the narrative of the novel Expo 58 by Jonathan Coe (published 2013) there is an imaginative and detailed description of the Pastorale in the chapter entitled 'The trouble with happiness'. It pays particular attention to the orchestration and to the overall shape of the piece, e.g. "...the main theme was by now beginning to take on the character of an old friend: once again, it rose and fell, rose and fell, a soft, endlessly renewable conversation between the different sections of the orchestra; until it too faded into nothingness, amid the dying flourishes of gossamer-bowed violins, the last twilit birdcalls of flute and clarinet."

== Source ==
- Coe, Jonathan (2014). Expo 58. London: Penguin Books. ISBN 978-0-24196-690-7.
