= Flute Concerto (Ibert) =

1932 Concerto by Jacques Ibert

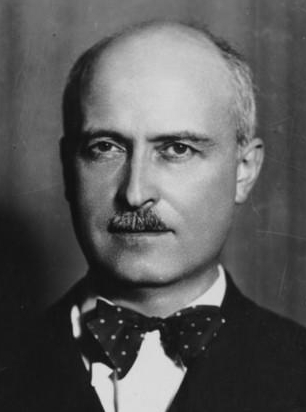
Jacques Ibert

Concerto for Flute and Orchestra was written by composer Jacques Ibert in 1932. The concerto comprises three movements (Allegro, Andante, and Allegro scherzando), and was first performed in 1934 in Paris at the Société des Concerts du Conservatoire. The piece was dedicated to Marcel Moyse, and features flute as the soloist lead instrument, along with small orchestra.

== Instrumentation ==
The concerto is scored for solo flute, two flutes, two oboes, two clarinets, two bassoons, two horns, trumpet, timpani and strings. A typical performance lasts about 20 minutes.
