= Soo Bee Lee =

British singer

- Born: 9 May 1934; Singapore
- Died: 31 August 2005 (aged 71)
- Education: Royal Academy of Music

Soo Bee Lee (May 9, 1934 – August 31, 2005) was a soprano singer from Singapore. She traveled to England in 1955 to study at the Royal Academy of Music. She was a gold medallist at the academy and had many roles on stage, notably at Glyndebourne and Sadler's Wells; and on television and radio in England and abroad. She also appeared in Aladdin at The London Coliseum in 1960, and on BBC TV's The Good Old Days.
