= 1934 in country music =

This is a list of notable events in country music that took place in the year 1934.

== Events ==
- August – Decca Records, Inc. established in New York City
- July – Columbia Phonograph Company purchased by the American Record Corporation (ARC)

== Top Hillbilly (Country) Recordings ==
The Great Depression continued to wreak havoc on the American record industry in 1934. The Grigsby-Grunow Company, owner of Columbia Phonograph Company, failed, and Columbia was put up for sale. Columbia operations, catalogue and trademarks, as well as Okeh Records, were purchased by the American Record Corporation (ARC) for $70,000 in July 1934. Columbia's pressing and warehouse facilities, along with equipment and machines, were absorbed by ARC, but for the next four years, both labels were dormant. Decca Records, Ltd., London, UK, formed Decca Records, Inc. in the United States, and began operations in August 1934. Three former Brunswick managers, including Jack Kapp, were hired.

The following songs were extracted from records included in Joel Whitburn's Pop Memories 1890-1954, record sales reported on the "Discography of American Historical Recordings" website, and other sources as specified. Numerical rankings are approximate, they are only used as a frame of reference.

Rank	Artist	Title	Label	Recorded	Released	Chart Positions
1	Sons of the Pioneers	"Tumbling Tumbleweeds"	Decca 5047	August 8, 1934	November 10, 1934	US BB 1934 #203, US #13 for 1 week, 2 total weeks, US Hillbilly 1934 #1, National Recording Registry 2010, Grammy Hall of Fame 2002
2	Gid Tanner and His Skillet Lickers	"Down Yonder"	Bluebird 5562	March 29, 1934	July 18, 1934	US BB 1934 #139, US #10 for 1 week, 6 total weeks, US Hillbilly 1934 #2
3	Delmore Brothers	"Brown's Ferry Blues"	Bluebird 5403	December 6, 1933	April 4, 1934	US Hillbilly 1934 #3
4	Tex Owens	"The Cattle Call"	Decca 5015	August 8, 1934	October 11, 1934	US Hillbilly 1934 #4
5	Linda Parker, Acc. By Cumberland Ridge Runners	"Take Me Back To Renfro Valley"	Conqueror 8164	April 11, 1933	December 1933	US Hillbilly 1934 #5
6	Kokomo Arnold	"Milk Cow Blues"	Decca 7026	September 10, 1934	November 1934	US Hillbilly 1934 #6
7	W. Lee O'Daniel and His Light Crust Doughboys with Leon Huff	"My Mary" (by Hamblen)	Vocalion 2872	October 1, 1934	November 1934	US Hillbilly 1934 #7
8	Rambling Red Foley with the Cumberland Ridge Runners	"I Got The Freight Train Blues"	Perfect 12996	March 21, 1934	April 18, 1934	US Hillbilly 1934 #8
9	Delmore Brothers	"I've Got The Big River Blues"	Bluebird 5531	December 6, 1933	July 5, 1934	US Hillbilly 1934 #9
10	Riley Puckett	"Ragged but Right"	Bluebird 5587	March 29, 1934	August 15, 1934	US Hillbilly 1934 #10
11	W. Lee O'Daniel and His Light Crust Doughboys	"Beautiful Texas" (O'Daniel)	Vocalion 2621	October 10, 1933	February 1934	US Hillbilly 1934 #11
12	Jimmie Rodgers	"Jimmie Rodgers' Last Blue Yodel"	Bluebird 5281	May 18, 1933	December 1933	US Hillbilly 1934 #12
13	Westerners (Massey Family)	"Ridin' Down That Old Texas Trail" (by Dott Massey)	Melotone 13006	March 21, 1934	May 1934	US Hillbilly 1934 #13
14	Stuart Hamblen and His Covered Wagon Jubilee	"Texas Plains" (by Hamblen)	Decca 5001	August 3, 1934	September 1934	US Hillbilly 1934 #14
15	Charlie Patton	"Stone Pony Blues"	Vocalion 2680	February 14, 1934	April 1934	US Hillbilly 1934 #15
16	Three Little Maids	"Since The Angels Took Mother Away"(by Jenny Lou Carson)	Bluebird 5336	December 12, 1933	February 1934	US Hillbilly 1934 #16
17	Gid Tanner and His Skillet Lickers	"On Tanners Farm"	Bluebird 5665	February 14, 1934	October 17, 1934	US Hillbilly 1934 #17
18	Sons of the Pioneers	"Way Out There"	Decca 5013	August 8, 1934	September 26, 1934	US Hillbilly 1934 #18
19	Jimmie Davis	"Beautiful Texas" (O'Daniel)	Bluebird 5394	August 5, 1933	April 1934	US Hillbilly 1934 #19
20	Ernest Phipps and His Holiness Singers	"A Little Talk With Jesus"	Bluebird 5540	October 30, 1928	July 10, 1934	US Hillbilly 1934 #20

== Births ==
- March 18 – Charley Pride, singer and songwriter, country music's first African-American star (d. 2020)
- March 31 – John D. Loudermilk, singer and songwriter (died 2016).
- April 1 – Jim Ed Brown, pop-styled singer who enjoyed success as part of a family group (The Browns), as a solo artist and as part of a duet (with Helen Cornelius), spanning the 1950s through early 1980s (died 2015).
- August 5 – Vern Gosdin, "The Voice" of many honky tonk-styled hits from the 1970s through early 1990s (died 2009).
- August 27 – Frances Preston, music executive (died 2012).
- October 24 – Sanger D. Shafer, AKA "Whitey" Shafer, songwriter (died 2019).
