= Escales (Ibert) =

1924 orchestral suite by Jacques Ibert

Escales ("Ports of Call") is a three-movement orchestral suite by Jacques Ibert. The music was inspired by several voyages the composer made in the years after the First World War. He did not originally give the three movements geographical titles, but they are now customarily headed "Rome–Palerme", "Tunis–Nefta" and "Valencia". Escales was an immediate success when premiered in Paris in 1924 and has remained one of Ibert's most popular works.

== Background ==
After distinguished naval service in the First World War – winning the Croix de Guerre and the Legion of Honour – Jacques Ibert resumed his interrupted musical career. In 1919 he sat for the Prix de Rome, France's most prestigious musical prize, and won it at the first attempt. The prize brought with it two or three years' residence in and study at the Villa Medici, the French Academy in Rome. Students were required to submit their new compositions to the Paris Conservatoire; Ibert's first submission from Rome was La Ballade de la Geôle de Reading a sombre orchestral piece inspired by Oscar Wilde's poem The Ballad of Reading Gaol. It was followed by an opera, Perseus and Andromeda and, in 1922–23, Escales.

Before setting off for Rome, Ibert had married his fiancée, Rose-Marie Veber. They sailed to the Balearic Islands but Ibert was taken ill in Majorca and the couple returned to Paris. Nevertheless, Ibert jotted down some musical impressions. In February 1921 the Iberts took a more extended sea trip, calling at various Mediterranean ports, before taking up residence in Rome. Ibert gathered more material during the cruise. The vibrancy and shimmering sunlight of Palermo in Sicily delighted him, and he invoked them in the tarantella rhythms of the first movement. The plaintive oboe melody of the second movement was transcribed from a chant he heard in Tunisia, and the third movement, inspired by Valencia, is an evocation of Spain in the tradition of Debussy and Ravel. In a 1967 biography of Ibert, Gérard Michel wrote:

[T]he work is not the musical illustration of a particular cruise ... It is a sound synthesis of several journeys during which the composer endeavoured to transcribe his impressions in the best tradition of romantic and modern "poet-symphonists".

== Premiere ==
The first performance of Escales was given on 6 January 1924 at the Salle Pleyel in Paris by the Lamoureux Orchestra conducted by Paul Paray.

== Reception ==
The work was well received in Paris. The music critic of Le Figaro wrote:

The three pieces of which the Escales are composed are remarkably balanced, their harmonious proportions are in close harmony with the nature, the quality, the meaning of the ideas. The orchestration, too, has emerged, clarified and lightened – and may be compared with that of Ravel – are ingenious, colourful, and evocative. Everything has its weight, its volume, its nuance. [...] There is no excess, no inadequacy, neither in the small details, which are exquisite, nor in the whole, which remains alive because of its rhythm. [...] His new work shows him to be master of his form, although the poet, the visionary that he has certainly remained, sometimes hides beneath the learned constructions that he has usefully practised here.

Escales was taken up internationally. It was given at the Prague International Festival shortly after the premiere, and was subsequently programmed by orchestras throughout Europe and in the US. It was not invariably applauded. After the British premiere, under Hamilton Harty, the reviewer in The Musical Times compared Ibert unfavourably with Joaquín Turina and Ottorino Respighi; after the Italian premiere a critic commented on the three movements, "They did not evoke admiration, the material used in their construction lacking both in invention and development – shortcomings that brilliance in orchestration did not compensate". Nevertheless, such was the general popularity of the piece that Ibert later complained mildly that it was overshadowing his subsequent compositions: "I have written twenty works since Escales, but ..."

== Score ==
The full score was published in 1924. The geographical labels now usually attached to each movement did not appear in it: they were added later, at the behest of his publisher and the composer raised no objection to them.

=== Orchestration ===
The work is scored for:

- Piccolo, 2 flutes (2nd doubling piccolo), 2 oboes, cor anglais, 2 clarinets, 3 bassoons
- 4 horns, 3 trumpets, 3 trombones, tuba
- Timpani (4 drums), bass drum, cymbals, military drum, tambourine, castanets, tam-tam, triangle, xylophone, celesta, 2 harps
- Strings

Source: Orchestral score and IMSLP.

=== Analysis ===
The total playing time of the work is about 15 minutes.

==== I. Rome–Palerme ====
Calme. G♯ minor, changing to F♯ major. 𝅘𝅥𝅮 = 63–69.
Over shimmering tremolos of high muted violins the solo flute has the opening melody. It is interspersed with dashes of harp tone, and the melody is taken up by a solo oboe, which is likewise interrupted by the harps. The movement grows increasingly brilliant and the theme is taken up by violins and finally by all the woodwinds. There follows a lively tune for solo trumpet, possibly indicating a new port of call or a fresh adventure. The music reaches a climax before calming down and reverting to the languorous calm of the opening.

==== II. Tunis–Nefta ====
Modéré, très rythmé. D minor. 𝅘𝅥 = 108.
An ostinato accompaniment of the strings and timpani, with the oboe melody marked doux et mélancolique (soft and melancholy), evokes the Middle East. Ibert said that the main theme, representing Nefta, was "entirely based on a tune I heard in the Tunisian desert. It helped me to recreate in music the atmosphere and the memory of the landscape and scenery where I spent several weeks". An uneven seven-beat pulse is sustained by strings both plucked (pizzicato) and tapped with the wood of the bow (avec le dos de l'archet).

==== III. Valencia ====
Animé. B♭ major. 𝅘𝅥. = 80.
Generations of French composers, including Lalo, Bizet, Chabrier, Debussy and Ravel had been fascinated by Spain and depicted it in their music. Ibert here follows in that tradition. The blazing colours with which the movement opens, the sinuous rhythms of its quieter bars, the mounting excitement and the fiery finish are all in this established tradition.

== Notes, references and sources ==
=== Sources ===
- Ibert, Jacques (1924). Escales (PDF). Paris: Alphonse Leduc. OCLC 165518480.
- Michel, Gérard (1967). Jacques Ibert (in French). Paris: Seghers. OCLC 988850.
- Nichols, Roger (2016). Ibert: Orchestral Works. Colchester: Chandos. OCLC 968245785.
- Wright, Simon (1994). Jacques Ibert. London: Decca. OCLC 946049576.
