= Bira (musician) =

Brazilian musician (1934–2019)

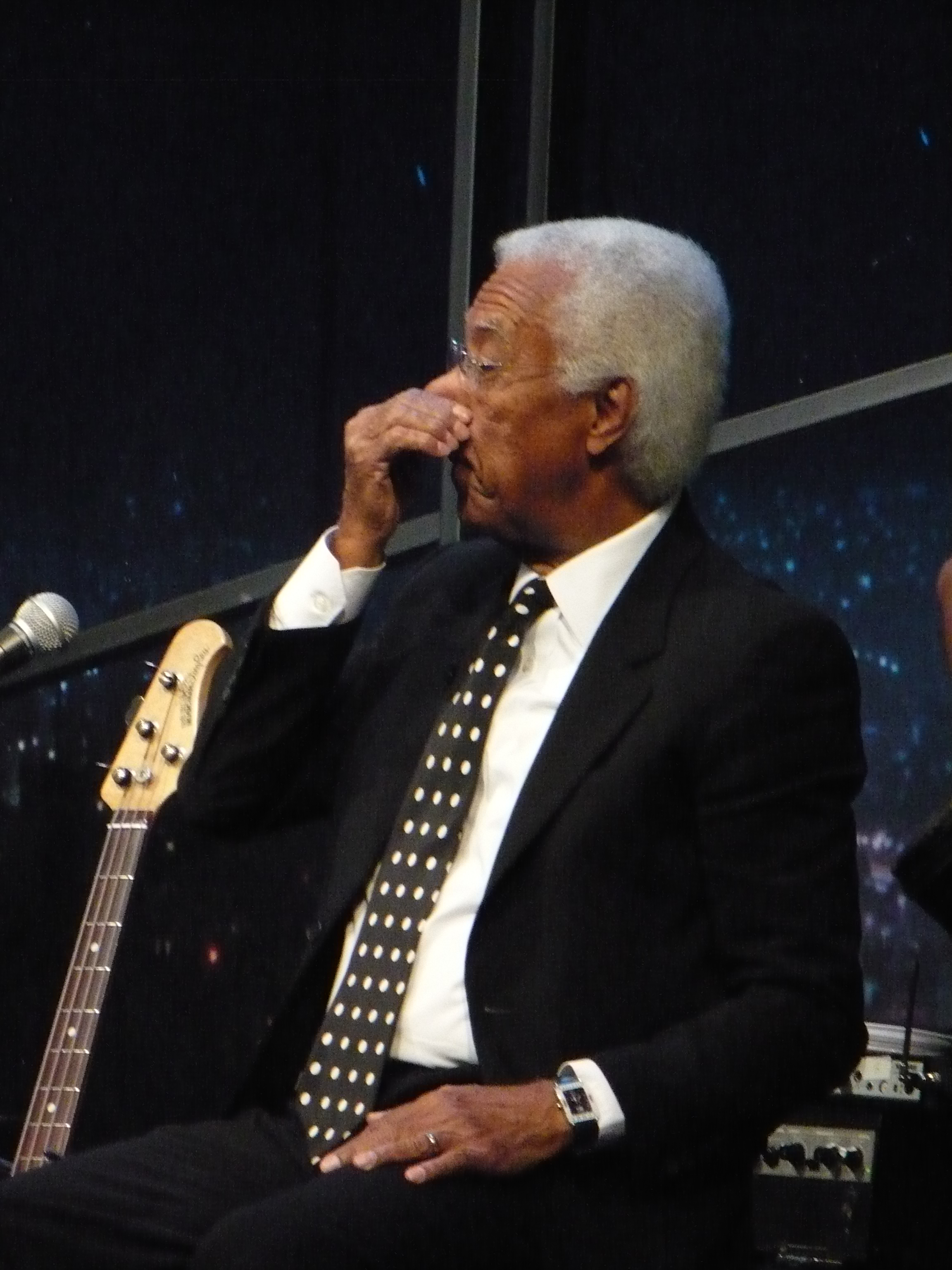
Ubirajara Penacho dos Reis

Ubirajara Penacho dos Reis (5 September 1934 – 22 December 2019), better known as Bira, was a Brazilian musician and bassist. He was best known for being a member of the house band of the talk shows Jô Soares Onze e Meia, broadcast on SBT, and Programa do Jô, broadcast on Rede Globo, both presented by Jô Soares.

Bira died on 22 December 2019, after suffering a stroke.
