= Jan Kirsznik =

Polish musician (1934–2018)

Jan Kirsznik (8 January 1934 – 1 August 2018) was a Polish rock and roll saxophonist and member of the Polish band Rhythm and Blues.

After the end of military service, in the second half of the 1950s, he became a musician of the Polish Navy Band. In 1958, he and Franciszek Walicki co-founded Rhythm and Blues, the first Polish rock and roll band. The band held its first concert on 24 March 1959 at the "Rudy Kot" club and was dissolved in 1960 after a nationwide concert tour.

In 1984, Kirsznik became a saxophonist in the Artistic Navy Team - Flotylla, accompanied by Irena Jarocka, as well as appearing at such musical events as the National Festival of Polish Song in Opole or the Sopot International Song Festival.
