= Cello Sonata (Shostakovich) =

1934 sonata for cello and piano by Dmitri Shostakovich

- by Dmitri Shostakovich
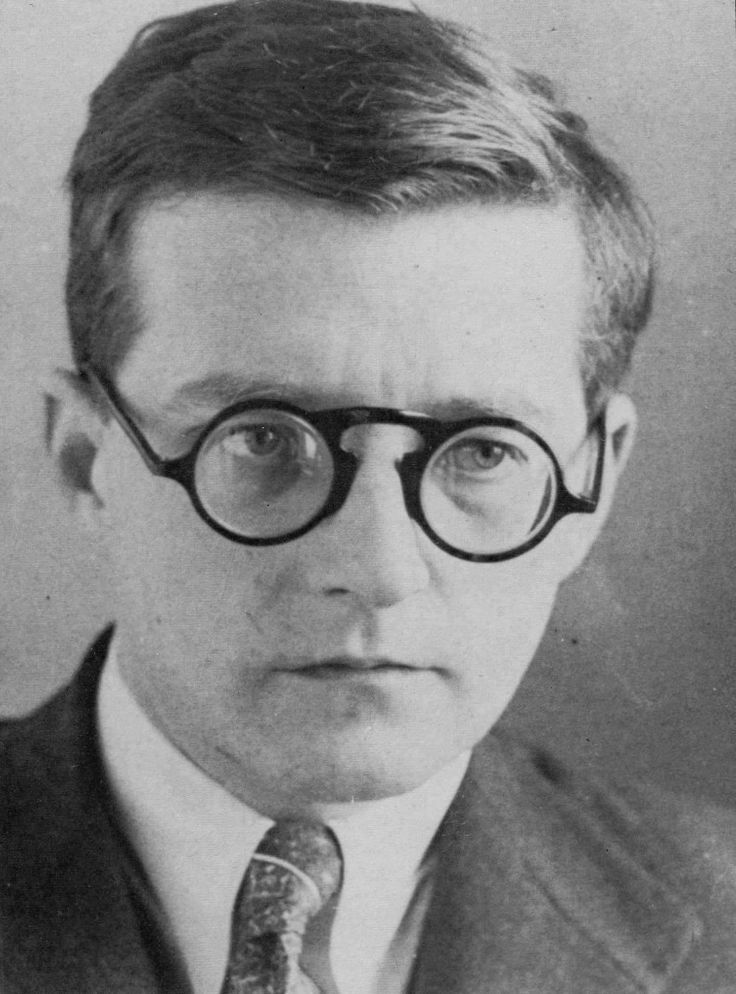
- Key: D minor
- Opus: 40
- Composed: 1934
- Dedication: Viktor Kubatsky
- Performed: 25 December 1934
- Published: 1951
- Movements: 4

The Cello Sonata in D minor, Op. 40, was composed in 1934 by Dmitri Shostakovich. It was also a period of emotional turmoil in his life, as he had fallen in love with a young student at a Leningrad festival featuring his Lady Macbeth of Mtsensk District. Their affair resulted in a brief separation from his wife Nina; he composed the Cello Sonata during this period. He completed it within a few weeks and gave its premiere in Moscow on 25 December with his close friend, the cellist Viktor Kubatsky, who was also the piece's dedicatee. By late 1934 Shostakovich and Nina reunited and she eventually became pregnant with their first-born daughter, who was born in 1936.

== Movements ==
=== I. Allegro non troppo ===
The sonata form first movement contrasts a broad first theme in the cello, accompanied by flowing piano arpeggios, developed by the piano until reaching a climax. The second theme is first played by the piano, then followed by the cello. In the development a rhythmic motif goes through the flowing textures of the first theme. The recapitulation appears with the second theme rather than the first. Shostakovich repeats the first theme where all moves in slow motion, with staccato chords in the piano and sustained notes in the cello.

=== II. Allegro ===
The moto perpetuo outer sections of the second movement frame a minuet-like trio.

=== III. Largo ===
The movement begins with the solo cello, which is later joined by the piano. The manuscript indicates the cello is to play con sordino.

=== IV. Allegro ===
The finale's rondo theme appears five times, imitated by both instruments, interspersed by episodes of scalar runs. In the second of these, the piano unfurls a brief cadenza. The theme returns, to round off the movement.
