= Barry Banks =

Barry Banks may refer to:

- Barry Banks (tenor) (born 1960), English lyric tenor
- Barry Banks (rugby league), English former rugby league footballer
