= Venice Baroque Orchestra =

The Venice Baroque Orchestra is a baroque orchestra founded in 1997 by the Italian conductor and harpsichordist Andrea Marcon, based in Venice, Italy.

In 2019, they performed with the Naumburg Orchestral Concerts, in the Naumburg Bandshell, Central Park, in the summer series.
