= Persée et Andromède =

Opera piece

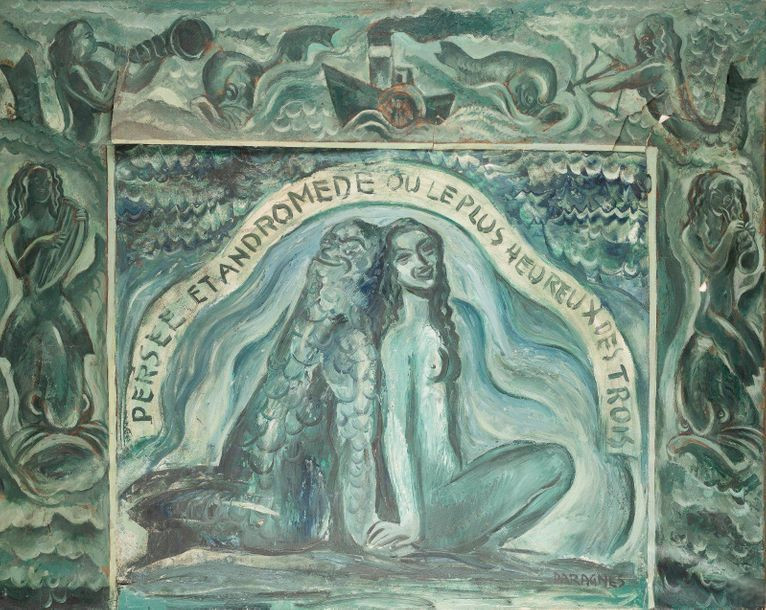
Jacques Ibert - Persée et Andromède - painting by Jean-Gabriel Daragnès, Paris 1929

Persée et Andromède is an opera in two acts by composer Jacques Ibert. The work uses a French-language libretto by Iber's brother-in-law, Michel Veber. Composed in 1921, it was Ibert's first opera. It did not premiere until eight years later when it was first staged in Paris on 15 May 1929. A recording, with Yann Beuron and Annick Massis in the title roles and Philippe Rouillon as the monster, was conducted by Jan Latham-Koenig in 2002 for Avie.
