= Nico Richter =

Dutch composer

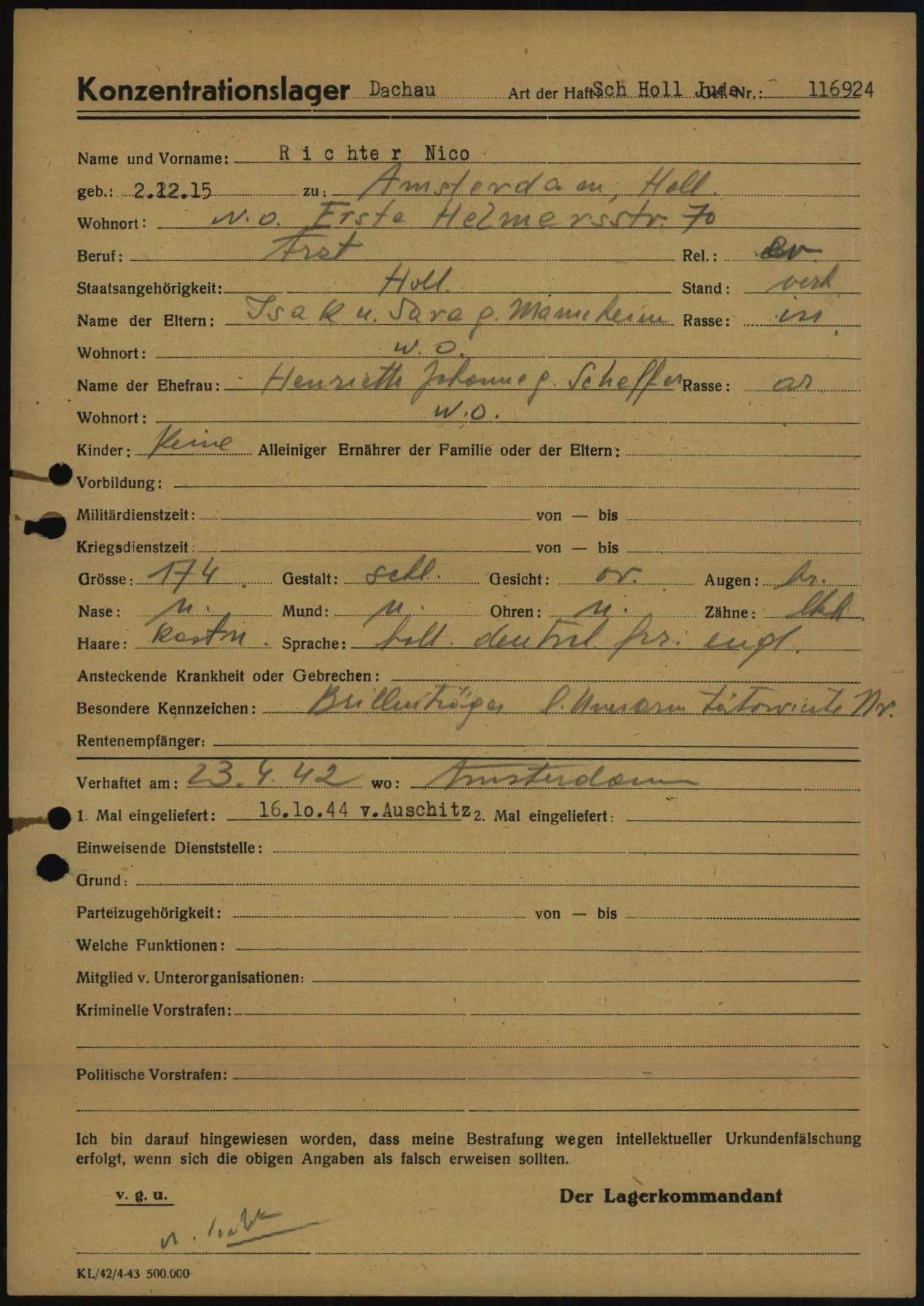
Registration form of Nico Richter as a prisoner at Dachau Nazi Concentration Camp

Nico Richter (2 December 1915, in Amsterdam – 16 August 1945, in Amsterdam) was a Dutch composer. He was Jewish.
