= Jacques Ibert =

French composer (1890–1962)

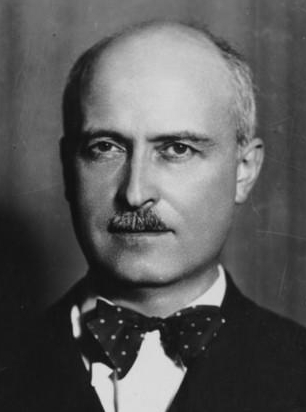
Jacques Ibert

Jacques François Antoine Marie Ibert (15 August 1890 – 5 February 1962) was a French composer of classical music. Having studied music from an early age, he studied at the Paris Conservatoire and won its top prize, the Prix de Rome at his first attempt, despite studies interrupted by his service in World War I.

Ibert pursued a successful composing career, writing (sometimes in collaboration with other composers) seven operas, five ballets, incidental music for plays and films, works for piano solo, choral works, and chamber music. He is probably best remembered for his orchestral works including Divertissement (1930) and Escales (1922).

As a composer, Ibert did not attach himself to any of the prevalent genres of music of his time, and has been described as an eclectic. This is seen even in his best-known pieces: Divertissement for small orchestra is lighthearted, even frivolous, and Escales (1922) is a ripely romantic work for large orchestra.

In tandem with his creative work, Ibert was the director of the Académie de France at the Villa Medici in Rome. During World War II he was proscribed by the pro-Nazi government in Paris, and for a time he went into exile in Switzerland. Restored to his former eminence in French musical life after the war, his final musical appointment was in charge of the Paris Opera and the Opéra-Comique.

== Biography ==
=== Early years ===
Ibert was born in Paris. His father was a successful businessman, and his mother a talented pianist who had studied with Antoine François Marmontel and encouraged the young Ibert's musical interests. From the age of four, he began studying music, first learning the violin and then the piano from his mother, despite his father's wishes that his son would follow in his business profession. After leaving school, he earned a living as a private teacher, as an accompanist, and as a cinema pianist. He also started composing songs, sometimes under the pen name William Berty, and helped his father's business, which had suffered a financial setback. In 1910, Ibert became a student at the Paris Conservatoire, studying with Émile Pessard (harmony), André Gedalge (counterpoint) and Paul Vidal (composition). Gédalge also gave him private lessons in orchestration; Ibert's fellow-students at these private classes included Arthur Honegger and Darius Milhaud.

Ibert's musical studies were interrupted by the outbreak of World War I, in which he served as a naval officer. After the war he married Rosette Veber, daughter of the painter Jean Veber. Resuming his studies, he won the Conservatoire's top prize, the Prix de Rome at his first attempt, in 1919. The prize gave him the opportunity to pursue further musical studies in Rome. In the course of these, Ibert composed his first opera, Persée et Andromède (1921), to a libretto by his brother-in-law, the author Michel Veber, writing under the pen name "Nino".

=== Composer and administrator ===
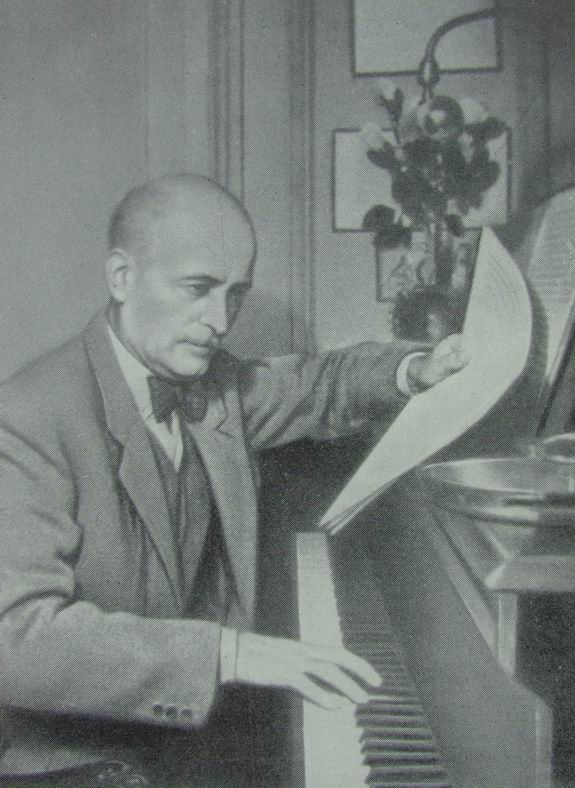
Ibert in the 1930s

Among Ibert's early orchestral compositions were La Ballade de la geôle de Reading, inspired by Oscar Wilde's poem, and Escales (Ports of Call), inspired by his experiences of Mediterranean ports. The first of these works was played at the Concerts Colonne in October 1922, conducted by Gabriel Pierné; the second was performed in January 1924 with Paul Paray conducting the Orchestre Lamoureux. The two works made Ibert an early reputation both at home and abroad. His publisher Alphonse Leduc commissioned two collections of piano music from him, Histoires and Les Rencontres, which enhanced his popularity. In 1927 his opéra-bouffe Angélique was produced; it was the most successful of his operas, a musical farce, displaying eclectic style and flair.

In addition to composing, Ibert was active as a conductor and in musical administration. He was a member of professional committees, and in 1937 he was appointed director of the Académie de France at the Villa Medici in Rome. Ibert, with the enthusiastic support of his wife "threw himself wholeheartedly into his administrative role and proved an excellent ambassador of French culture in Italy." He held the post until the end of 1960, except for an enforced break while France and Italy were at war during World War II.

=== Later years ===
The war years were difficult for Ibert. In 1940 the Vichy government banned his music and he retreated to Antibes, in the south of France, and later to Switzerland and the Haute-Savoie. In August 1944, he was readmitted to the musical life of the country when General de Gaulle recalled him to Paris. In 1955 Ibert was appointed administrator of the Réunion des Théâtres Lyriques Nationaux, which ran both the Paris Opera and the Opéra-Comique. After less than a year, his health obliged him to retire. Shortly afterwards he was elected to the Académie des Beaux-Arts.

Ibert died in Paris aged 71, and is buried at Passy Cemetery in the city's 16th arrondissement.

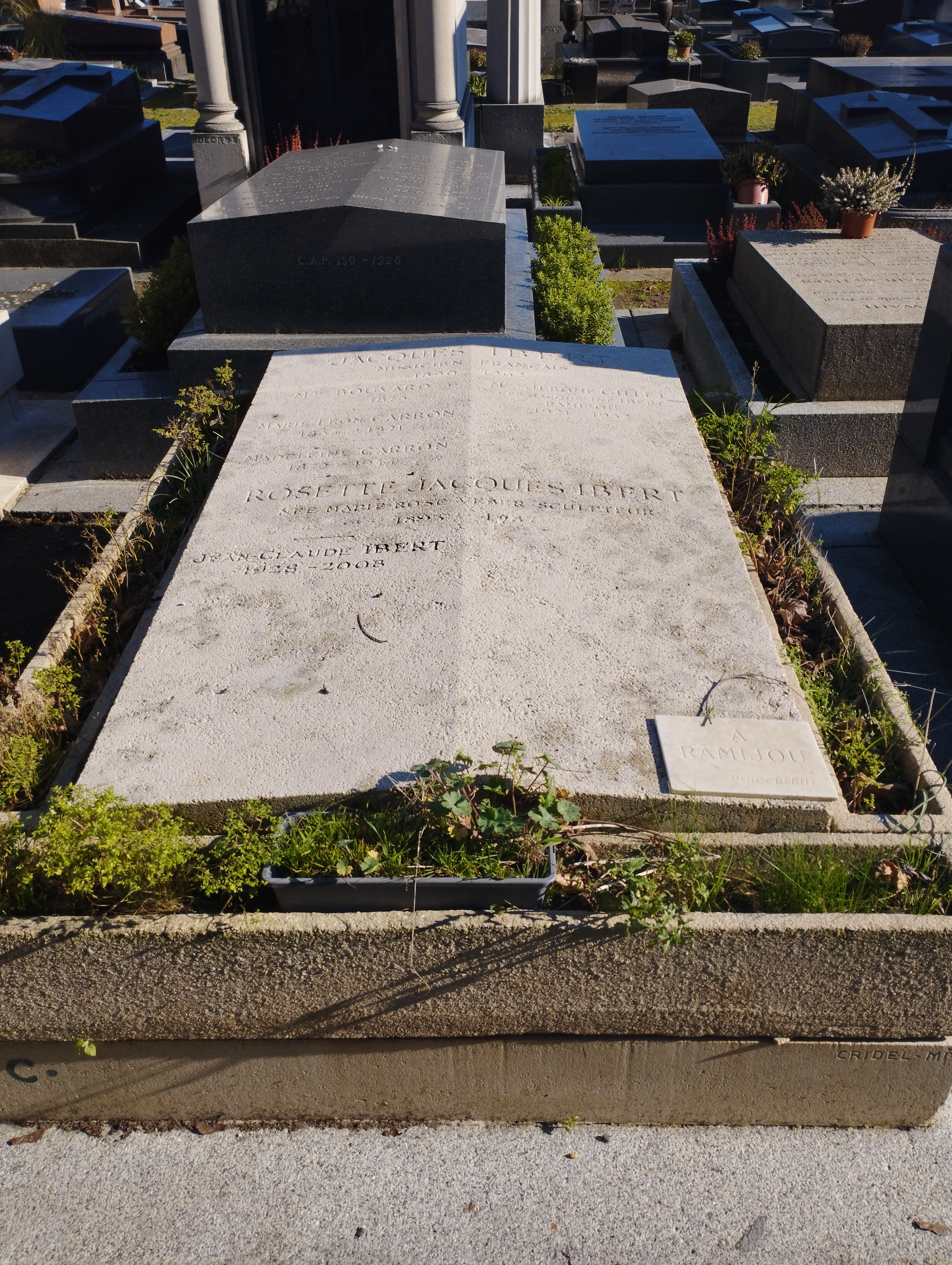
Ibert's grave

== Music ==
Ibert refused to ally himself to any particular musical fashion or school, maintaining that "all systems are valid", a position that has caused many commentators to categorise him as "eclectic". His biographer Alexandra Laederich writes, "His music can be festive and gay … lyrical and inspired, or descriptive and evocative … often tinged with gentle humour … all the elements of his musical language bar that of harmony relate closely to the Classical tradition." The early orchestral works, such as Escales, are in "a lush Impressionist style", but Ibert is at least as well known for lighthearted, even frivolous, pieces, among which are the Divertissement for small orchestra and the Flute Concerto.

Ibert's stage works similarly embrace a wide variety of styles. His first opera, Persée et Andromède, is a concise, gently satirical piece. Angélique displays his "eclectic style and his accomplished writing of pastiche set pieces". Le roi d'Yvetot is written, in part in a simple folklike style. The opéra bouffe Gonzague is another essay in the old opera bouffe style. L'Aiglon, composed jointly with Honegger, employs commedia dell'arte characters and much musical pastiche in a style both accessible and sophisticated. For the farcical Les petites Cardinal the music is in set pieces in the manner of an operetta. By contrast Le chevalier errant, a choreographic piece incorporating chorus and two reciters, is in an epic style. Ibert's practice of collaborating with other composers extended to his works for the ballet stage. His first work composed expressly for the ballet was a waltz for L'éventail de Jeanne (1929) to which he was one of ten contributors, others of whom were Ravel and Poulenc. He was the sole composer of four further ballets between 1934 and 1954.

For the theatre and cinema, Ibert was a prolific composer of incidental music. His best-known theatre score was music for Eugène Labiche's Un chapeau de paille d'Italie, which Ibert later reworked as the suite Divertissement. Other scores ranged from music for farce to that for Shakespeare productions. His cinema scores covered a similarly broad range. He wrote the music for more than a dozen French films, and for American directors he composed a score for Orson Welles's 1948 film of Macbeth, and the Circus ballet for Gene Kelly's Invitation to the Dance in 1952.

== Works ==
Cinq Pieces en Trio - II. Andantino
Performed by Michael Henoch, Larry Combs and William Buchman

=== Operas ===
- Persée et Andromède (1921)
- Angélique (1927)
- Le roi d'Yvetot (1930)
- Gonzague (1931)
- L'Aiglon (1937, Acts 1 and 5, the rest by Arthur Honegger)
- Les petites cardinal (1938, operetta, with Honegger)
- Barbe-bleue (1943)

=== Ballets ===
- Les amours de Jupiter, ballet (1945)
- Le chevalier errant, épopée choréographique (1951)

=== Orchestral ===
- La ballade de la geôle de Reading (1920)
- Escales (1922)
- Féerique (1924)
- Valse de L'éventail de Jeanne (1927)
- Divertissement for chamber orchestra (1930)
- Suite symphonique Paris for chamber orchestra (1930)
- Symphonie marine (1931)
- Ouverture de fête (1940)
- Louisville Concerto (1953)
- Hommage à Mozart (1955)
- Bacchanale (1956)
- Tropismes pour des amours imaginaires (1957)
- Bostoniana (1961; first movement of an unfinished symphony)

=== Concertante ===
- Concerto for Cello and Wind Instruments (1925)
- Flute Concerto (1934)
- Concertino da camera for Alto Saxophone and Eleven Instruments (1935–1936)
- Symphonie Concertante for Oboe and String Orchestra

=== Chamber/Instrumental ===
- Six pièces for harp solo (1916–1917)
- Trois Pièces for organ Pièce Solennelle, Musette, Fugue (1920)
- Deux mouvements for 2 flutes (or flute and oboe), clarinet and bassoon (1921)
- Jeux, Sonatine for flute and piano (1923)
- Le Jardinier de Samos for flute, clarinet, trumpet, violin, cello and percussion (1924)
- Française for guitar (1926)
- Arie (Vocalise) for flute, violin and piano (1927)
- Aria for flute (or other instrument) and piano (1927, 1930)
- Trois pièces brèves for wind quintet (1930)
- Ariette for guitar (1935)
- Cinq pièces en trio for oboe, clarinet and bassoon (1935)
- Entr'acte for flute (or violin) and harp (or guitar) (1935)
- Pièce for flute solo (1936)
- String Quartet (1937–1942)
- Capriccio pour dix instruments for flute, oboe, clarinet, bassoon, trumpet, harp, 2 violins, viola, and cello (1936–1938)
- Trio for violin, cello and harp (1944)
- Deux interludes for flute, violin and harpsichord (or harp) (1946)
- Étude-caprice pour un Tombeau de Chopin for cello solo (1949)
- Ghirlarzana for cello solo (1950)
- Caprilena for violin solo (1950)
- Impromptu for trumpet and piano (1950)
- Carignane for bassoon and piano (1953)
- Arabesque for bassoon and piano

=== Piano ===
- Histoires, ten pieces for piano (1922)
- Toccata (D major)
- Escales (arr. for piano by the composer)
- Le vent dans les ruines (En Champagne)
- Les rencontres (Petite suite en forme de ballet)
- Matin sur l'eau
- Noel en Picardie
- Petite suite en 15 images (1944)
- Valse de L'éventail de Jeanne (arr. for piano by the composer)

=== Vocal/Choral ===
- Le poète et la fée

=== Incidental music ===
- Suite Élisabéthaine for Shakespeare's A Midsummer Night's Dream (1942)
- Entr'acte for Pedro Ignacio Calderón's El médico de su honra (Le médecin de son honneur) (1937)

=== Film music ===
- S.O.S. Foch (director, Jean Arroy), 1931
- Moon Over Morocco (Julien Duvivier), 1931
- Don Quichotte (Georg Wilhelm Pabst), 1932
- The Two Orphans (Maurice Tourneur), 1933
- Motherhood (Jean Choux), 1934
- Justin de Marseille (Tourneur), 1935
- Golgotha (Duvivier), 1935
- Le Coupable (Raymond Bernard), 1936
- Anne-Marie, 1936
- The Former Mattia Pascal (L'Homme de nulle part) (Pierre Chenal), 1937
- Conflict (Léonide Moguy), 1938
- The Patriot (1938)
- Sirocco (1938)
- Angelica (1939)
- Thérèse Martin (1939)
- The Phantom Carriage (1939)
- Heroes of the Marne (André Hugon), 1939
- La Comédie du bonheur (Marcel L'Herbier), 1940
- Les Petites du quai aux fleurs (Marc Allégret), 1944
- Macbeth (Orson Welles), 1948
- Circus (ballet for Invitation to the Dance, Gene Kelly), 1952;
- Marianne of My Youth (Duvivier), 1955
