= Sinfonietta Rīga =

Chamber orchestra in Latvia

Sinfonietta Rīga is a Latvian chamber orchestra based in Rīga.

== History ==
The Latvian oboist Normunds Šnē founded Sinfonietta Rīga in 2006 and became its first artistic director. Consisting of young students, the orchestra is influenced by Western and Eastern culture. Arvo Pärt's works were presented by the ensemble at the Elbphilharmonie, Hamburg. The chamber ensemble has recorded with WERGO and Ondine. Guest conductors of the ensemble have included Paavo Järvi.

In addition to standard Western European classical repertoire, Sinfonietta Rīga often plays Latvian and Baltic music and commissions works by contemporary Latvian composers. Important are collaborations with Jörg Widmann, Christian Lindberg and Martin Grubinger. Another orchestra from Riga is the Latvian National Symphony Orchestra.

Šnē is scheduled to stand down as the ensemble's artistic director at the close of the 2026-2027 season. In May 2026, the orchestra announced the appointment of Olari Elts as its next artistic director, effective with the 2026-2027 season.

== Awards ==
- 2007, 2008, 2015, 2018 Grand Music Award Latvia
- 2014 Grammy Award for Pärt's Adam's Lament

== Discography ==
- Beethoven, Ludwig van; Vaughan Williams, Ralph; Gould, Thomas; Sinfonietta Riga (2015), Live in Riga (in no linguistic content), Hungerford, Arles: Edition records; [Distrib. Harmonia mundi distribution], OCLC 944257203
- Ivanovs, Jānis; Snē, Normunds; Sinfonietta Rīga (2018), Symphonies for strings (in no linguistic content), Riga: SKANI, OCLC 1089344886
- Dzenītis, Andris; Adamaite, Kristīne; Sīmanis, Artis; Kl̦ava, Sigvards; Putnin̦š, Kaspars; Snē, Normunds; Lakstīgala, Atvars; Sinfonietta Rīga; Altera Veritas Ensemble; Latvijas Radio koris (2021), Andris Dzenītis, SKANI, OCLC 1257485973
- Ešenvalds, Ēriks; Parša, Ieva; Kurševs, Jānis; Kalnin̦š, Daumants; Ezeriete, Ieva; Paegle, Līga; Kl̦ava, Sigvards; Maijers, Aleksandrs; Sinfonietta Rīga; Latvijas Radio koris (2016), St. Luke Passion: sacred works, Helsinki, Finland: Ondine, OCLC 989073134
- Jakubone, Ināra; Vasks, Pēteris; Shimkus, Vestard; Dubra, Rihards; Sirmais, Māris; Dzenītis, Andris; Ešenvalds, Ēriks; Putniņš, Kaspars; Zemzaris, Imants; Pashkevich, Deniss; Valsts Akademiskais Koris Latvija; Sinfonietta Rīga; Latvijas Radio Koris; Shin (2011), Music in Latvia 2011 [CD] Music in Latvia 2011, Riga: Latvian Music Information Centre, OCLC 953241240
- Pärt, Arvo; Hirv, Tui; Kaljuste, Tõnu; Vilu, Rainer; Estlands Filharmoniske Kammerkor; Estlands Symfoniorkester; Lettiske Radiokor; Sinfonietta Riga; Tallinns Kammerorkester; Vox Clamantis-Ensemblet, Tallinn (2012), Adam's lament (in multiple languages), ECM Records, OCLC 873674299
- Vasks, Pēteris; Pogostkina, Alina; Kangas, Juha; Sinfonietta Rīga (2012), Vox amoris (in no linguistic content), Mainz: WERGO, OCLC 811645897
- Selickis, Andrejs; Kl̦ava, Sigvards; Latvijas Radio koris; Sinfonietta Rīga (2018), Paradisus vocis (in Latin), Helsinki: Ondine, OCLC 1089139263
- Katsnelson, Yakov; Rysanov, Maxim; Schubert, Franz; Akhunov, Sergey; Desi︠a︡tnikov, Leonid; Tabakova, Dobrinka; Riga Sinfonietta (2017), In Schubert's company (in no linguistic content), London: Onyx, OCLC 1110008471

== Artistic directors ==
- Normunds Šnē (2006–present)
- Olari Elts (designate, effective autumn 2026)
