= Andris Poga =

Latvian orchestral conductor (born 1980)

- Born: June 29, 1980 (age 46); Riga, Latvia
- Education: Jāzeps Vītols Latvian Academy of Music; University of Music and Performing Arts Vienna; University of Latvia
- Occupation: Conductor
- Known for: Music director of the Latvian National Symphony Orchestra
- Awards: Grand Music Award (2007); Evgeny Svetlanov Conducting Competition (2010)

Andris Poga (born 29 June 1980, in Riga) is a Latvian orchestral conductor.

== Biography ==
Poga is a graduate of the Jāzeps Vītols Latvian Academy of Music, where he studied trumpet and conducting. He also studied conducting at the University of Music and Performing Arts in Vienna and philosophy at the University of Latvia.

From 2007 to 2010, Poga was artistic director and principal conductor of the Professional Symphonic Band Rīga. Poga received the Grand Music Award in 2007 in the category Debut of the Year for his concert with the Latvian National Symphony Orchestra.

In 2010, Poga won first prize in the second Evgeny Svetlanov Conducting Competition in Montpellier, France. From 2011 to 2014, Poga was assistant conductor to Paavo Järvi at Orchestre de Paris. From 2012 to 2014, he was assistant conductor of the Boston Symphony Orchestra.

Poga became music director of the Latvian National Symphony Orchestra (LNSO) with the 2013–2014 season. He concluded his chief conductorship of the LNSO at the close of the 2021–2022 season and now has the title of artistic advisor of the LNSO.

In June 2019, the Stavanger Symphony Orchestra announced the appointment of Poga as its next chief conductor, effective with the 2021–2022 season, with an initial contract of three seasons. In June 2023, the orchestra announced an extension of Poga's contract as chief conductor through the 2025-2026 season.

Poga has made commercial recordings for such labels as Odradek Records, Skani and Myrios Classics.

Cultural offices
Preceded by Karel Mark Chichon	Chief Conductor, Latvian National Symphony Orchestra; 2013–2022	Succeeded by Tarmo Peltokoski
Preceded by Christian Vásquez	Chief Conductor, Stavanger Symphony Orchestra; 2021–present	Succeeded by incumbent
