= Garanča =

Origin
- Origin: Latvian

Garanča (masculine: Garančs) is a Latvian topographic surname. Notable people with the surname include:

- Anita Garanča (1949–2015), Latvian singer, mother of Elīna
- Elīna Garanča (born 1976), Latvian opera singer
