= Yip Wing-sie =

Hong Kong conductor (born 1960)

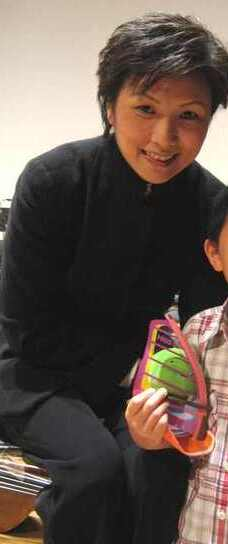
- Born: 5 October 1960 (age 65); Guangzhou, China
- Occupation: Conductor
- Parent: Yip Wai-hong

Yip Wing-sie (Chinese: 葉詠詩; pinyin: ip wiŋ si; born 1960 in Guangzhou, China) is a Hong Kong musician.

Yip Wing-sie was the Music Director of Hong Kong Sinfonietta from 2002 to 2020. Positions she previously held are Principal Conductor and later Music Director of Guangzhou Symphony Orchestra and Resident Conductor of Hong Kong Philharmonic Orchestra.

Winner of the First Prize as well as "LYRE d’OR" in the 35th Concours International de Jeunes Chefs d’Orchestre de Besançon, France in 1985 and a prizewinner in the 8th Tokyo International Conducting Competition in 1988, Yip is in great demand as a guest conductor in Asia. Orchestras she has conducted include the Central Philharmonic Orchestra of China, China National Symphony Orchestra, Shanghai Symphony Orchestra, Seoul Philharmonic, Osaka Philharmonic, New Japan Philharmonic, Tokyo Mozart Players, the symphony orchestras of Sapporo, Yomiuri, Taiwan, Tasmania, Melbourne and Queensland as well as the Auckland Philharmonia of New Zealand. In Europe, Yip's engagements have included concerts with the Orchestre National du Capitol de Toulouse and the Chambre Orchestre de Besançon in France, Warsaw Philharmonic in Poland, Spain's Tenerife Symphony Orchestra and the Czech State Orchestra of Košice. She has also conducted at prestigious venues and festivals such as the Vienna Musikverein (Grossersaal), Beijing Music Festival, Fukuoka's Asian Month Festival in Japan, Hong Kong Arts Festival and Macao International Music Festival. Yip has collaborated with such renowned artists as Augustin Dumay, Fou Ts’ong, Shlomo Mintz, Anne-Sophie Mutter, Itzhak Perlman and Pinchas Zukerman. Operas she has conducted include Guo Wen-jin's Poet Li Bai and the world première of La Peintre with Taiwan Philharmonic.

As Music Director of Hong Kong Sinfonietta, Yip has taken the orchestra on tour in recent years to Switzerland, France, Italy, Poland, Lithuania, Canada, the USA, Japan, Korea, Beijing, Shanghai, and in South America in Argentina, Brazil and Uruguay.

Born in Guangzhou and brought up in Hong Kong, Yip graduated from the Royal College of Music in London and Indiana University at Bloomington, USA, where she obtained her master's degree in violin performance and conducting. As the winner of the Koussevitsky Scholarship and the Seiji Ozawa Fellowship Award, Yip also attended the conducting seminar and fellowship programmes at the Tanglewood Music Center. Her mentors included great maestros such as Norman Del Mar, Leonard Bernstein, Seiji Ozawa, Gustav Meier and David Atherton.

Accolades Yip has received internationally include "Chevalier de l’Ordre National du Mérite" bestowed by the French Government (2015), "Chevalier dans l’Ordre des Arts et des Lettres" by the Ministry of Culture and Communication of France, Fellow of the Royal College of Music (FRCM), and she was also named the Ong Teng Cheong Distinguished Visiting Professor at the Yong Siew Toh Conservatory of Music, National University of Singapore. In Hong Kong, she was awarded "Hong Kong Women of Excellence in the Six Arts Award" by the Hong Kong Federation of Women and the Bronze Bauhinia Star (BBS) by the Hong Kong Government, and was named University Artist at The University of Hong Kong.

After the 2019/2020 season, Yip stepped down from the music director position at the Hong Kong Sinfonietta after 18 years at the helm.

== Filmography ==
Year	Film	Role	Notes
2009	The Real	Host	BBC
2009	Hong Kong Power	Guest host	Youtube
