= Bochumer Symphoniker =

German symphony orchestra

- Orchestra
- Logo
- Native name: Bochumer Symphoniker
- Former name: Städtisches Orchester
- Founded: 1918
- Concert hall: Anneliese Brost Musikforum Ruhr; Viktoriastraße; Bochum, Germany
- Principal conductor: Tung-Chieh Chuang
- Website: bochumer-symphoniker.de

The Bochumer Symphoniker is a German orchestra based in Bochum. Its primary residence is the Anneliese Brost Musikforum Ruhr.

== History ==
The orchestra was founded in 1918 originally as the Städtisches Orchester Bochum (Municipal Orchestra), at the same time as the Bochum Theatre, with the primary purpose to accompany theatrical productions. The orchestra gave its first public concert with conductor Rudolf Schulz-Dornburg, its first Generalmusikdirektor (GMD), on 20 May 1919.

Under GMD Klaus Nessträter (1938–1944), the orchestra received attention throughout Germany, especially for its operas. Between September 1944 and July 1945, the orchestra halted concerts. After the war, the orchestra resumed activity. At the opening of the theatre's new building in 1955, Paul Hindemith was guest conductor. The orchestra played for the grand opening of the World Exhibition Expo 58 in Brussels in 1958 with Franz-Paul Decker as music director.

During the chief conductorship of Yvon Baarspul, from 1964 to 1970, the size of the orchestra was increased by 17 musicians to a total of 80. As well, the orchestra was renamed the Bochumer Symphoniker.

Eberhard Kloke served as GMD from 1988 to 1994. Kloke introduced contemporary music to the orchestra's repertoire and sought out new concert venues. In 1991, the orchestra played for the first time at the Jahrhunderthalle (Centennial Hall) in Bochum.

Steven Sloane was the longest-serving GMD of the orchestra, from 1994 to 2021. During Sloane's tenure, the orchestra has twice received the German Music Publishers' Association (Deutscher Musikverleger-Verband) prize for best concert programme of the year, in the 1996/1997 and 2004/2005 seasons. In 2006, the orchestra performed a new version of the opera Die Soldaten by Bernd Alois Zimmermann at the Ruhrtriennale. The orchestra then presented at the 2008 Lincoln Center Festival in New York City, at the Park Avenue Armory. The orchestra's principal venues for rehearsals and concerts prior to 2016 were the main auditorium of the Ruhr University Bochum and the Centennial Hall, Bochum. In October 2016, the orchestra took up residence in their new concert hall, the Anneliese Brost Musikforum Ruhr. Sloane concluded his Bochum tenure at the close of the 2020/2021 season.

Tung-Chieh Chuang first guest-conducted the orchestra in April 2018. In June 2020, the orchestra announced the appointment of Chuang as its next GMD, effective with the 2021–2022 season, with an initial contract of 3 years. In November 2022, the orchestra announced the extension of Chuang's contract as GMD through July 2026. Chuang concluded his tenure with the orchestra on 31 July 2026.

In March 2025, Aurel Dawidiuk first guest-conducted the orchestra. In October 2025, the orchestra and the city of Bochum announced the appointment of Dawidiuk as its next GMD, effective with the 2026–2027 season, with an initial contract of three years.

For ASV Records, the orchestra has recorded the complete works of Joseph Marx. The first CD, Natur-Trilogie, received the British Music Society's best CD of the Month award. The second CD, the Orchesterlieder, was nominated for a Grammy.

== General Music Directors (Generalmusikdirektoren) ==
- Rudolf Schulz-Dornburg (1919–1926)
- Leopold Reichwein (1926–1938)
- Klaus Nettsträter (1938–1944)
- Hermann Meißner (1945–1956)
- Franz-Paul Decker (1956–1964)
- Yvon Baarspul (1964–1970)
- Othmar Mága (1971–1982)
- Gabriel Chmura (1982–1988)
- Eberhard Kloke (1988–1994)
- Steven Sloane (1994–2021)
- Tung-Chieh Chuang (2021–2026)
- Aurel Dawidiuk (2026–)
