= Anneliese Brost Musikforum Ruhr =

Coordinates: 51.4775°N 7.21486°E

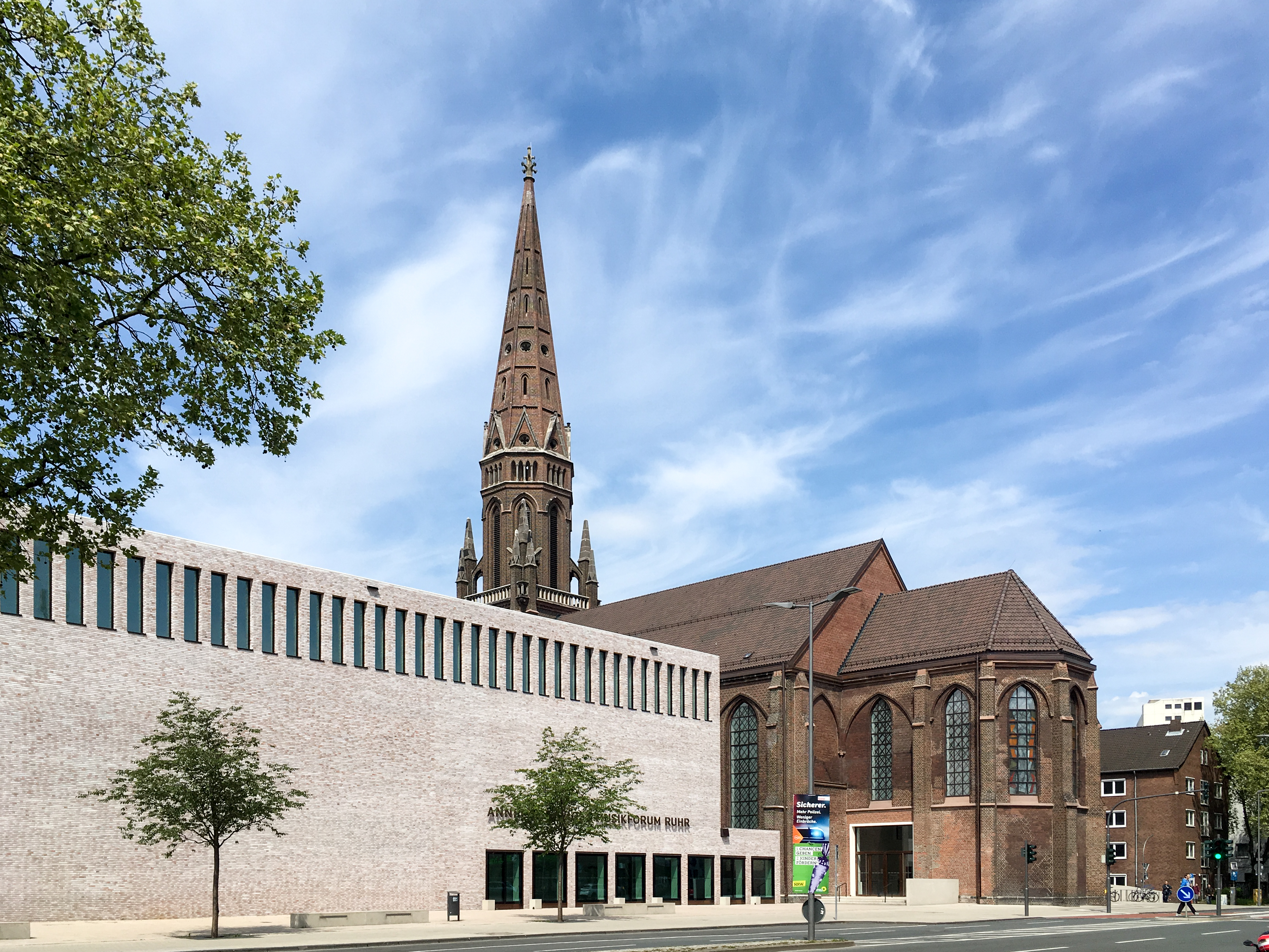
The music hall. Foyer in the former church of St. Mary.

The Anneliese Brost Musikforum Ruhr is a music hall for classical music. It is located in Bochum, Germany. It was opened on 28 October 2016. The building consists of three parts: an auditorium holding up to 1026 people, the entrance area in the middle (which is in the desacralized church of St. Marien), and a second hall which holds an audience of up to 250 people. The big hall is designed for symphonic concerts, the smaller one for chamber music.

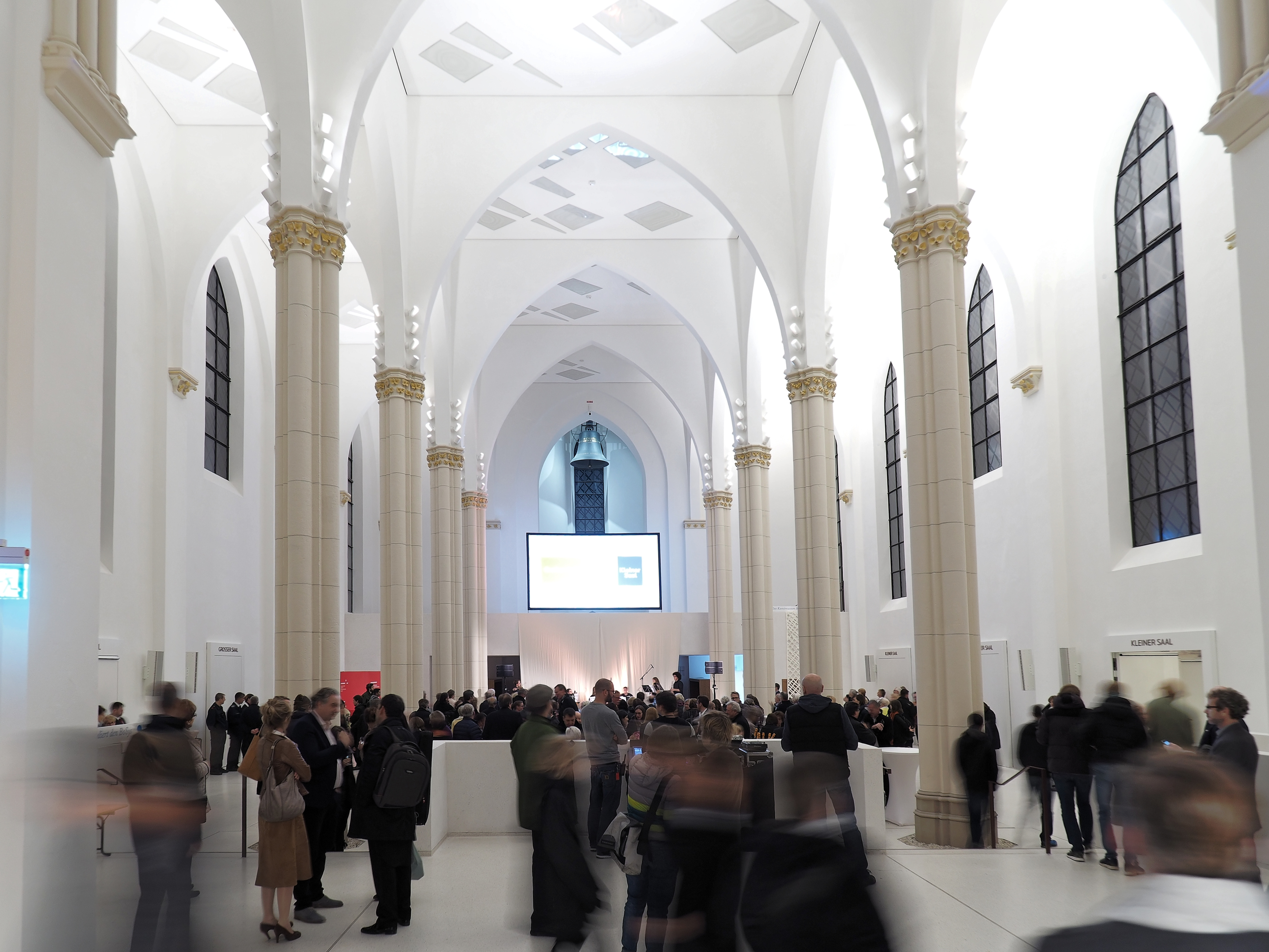
Foyer at opening

The hall is the home location of the Bochumer Symphoniker orchestra. The decision to build the Anneliese Brost Musikforum Ruhr was made with considerable backing from the American composer, Steven Sloane.
