= Rotterdam Philharmonic Orchestra =

Dutch symphony orchestra

The Rotterdam Philharmonic Orchestra (RPhO; Dutch: Rotterdams Philharmonisch Orkest) is a Dutch symphony orchestra based in Rotterdam. Its primary venue is the concert hall De Doelen. The RPhO is considered one of the Netherlands' two principal orchestras of international standing, second to the Royal Concertgebouw Orchestra of Amsterdam. In addition to symphony concerts, the RPhO performs as the opera orchestra in productions at De Nederlandse Opera, as do other Dutch ensembles.

== History ==
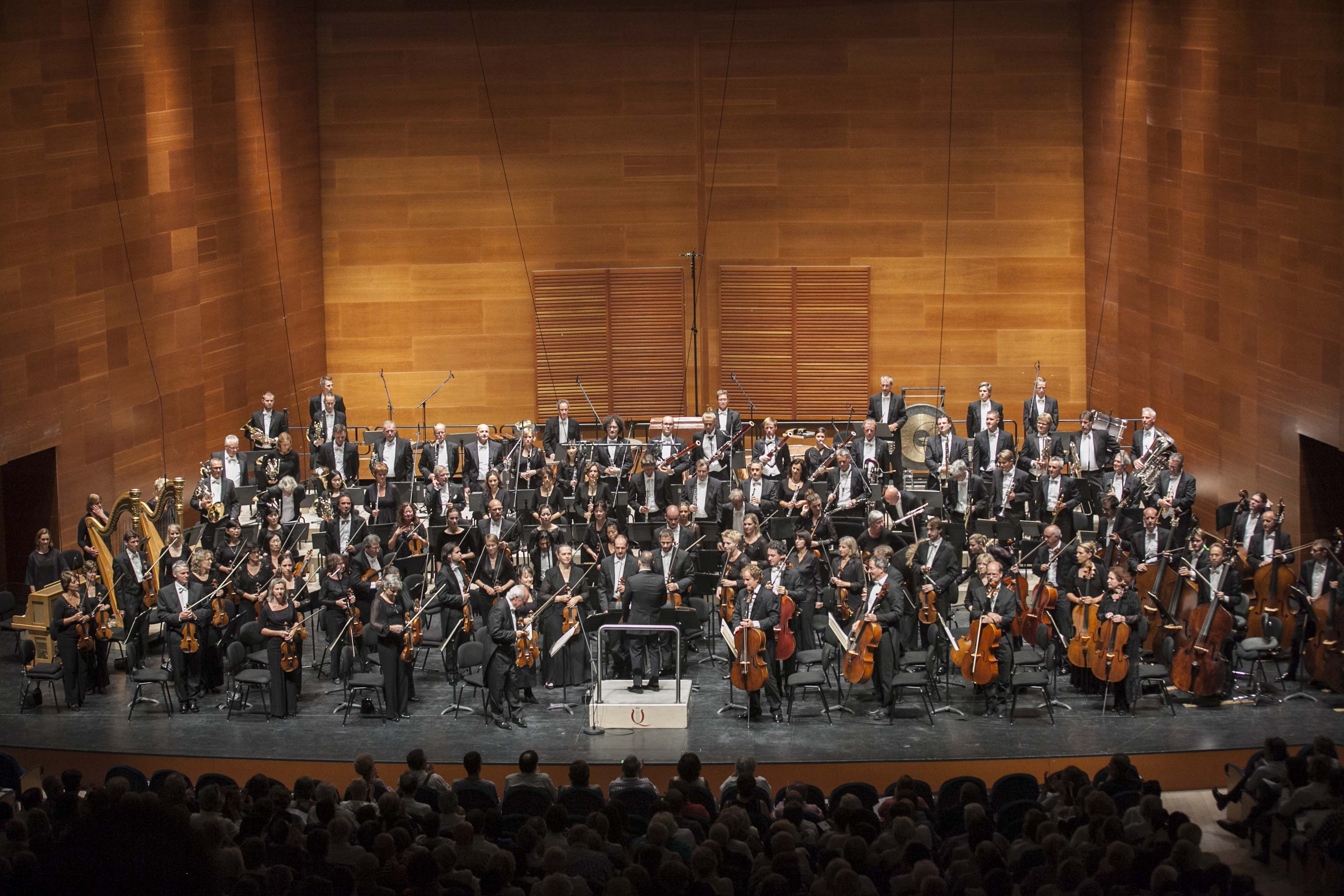
The orchestra appears at the Quincena Musical de San Sebastián, 2014

Several musicians founded the RPhO in 1918 as a private "Society of Professional Musicians for Mutual Cultivation of the Arts". It had paying members and the aim was to make music for personal pleasure without pursuit of gain. The first musical director was Willem Feltzer, who was the manager of two Rotterdam music schools. Alexander Schmuller succeeded Felzer as music director, for two years. In May 1930, Eduard Flipse was appointed principal conductor, and held the post until 1962. Under his stewardship, the amateur ensemble evolved into a professional orchestra. When Flipse took over from Feltzer and Schmuller, the orchestra was in poor shape both financially and artistically. However, Filpse had both managerial skills and musical vision. He established an "Instrument Fund" to raise funds for new instruments and other necessities, and the orchestra became known for its special attention to contemporary music, featuring the work of Dutch composers such as Johan Wagenaar, Willem Pijper and Alphons Diepenbrock.

A 1300-seat concert hall, the Doelen, was built in 1935, and the orchestra was rewarded by rising attendance numbers. When the Rotterdam City Council began to subsidize the orchestra, its problems seemed to be in the past.

On May 7, 1940, the orchestra played a concert of Bruch and Stravinsky in a celebration of Flipse's first ten years as conductor. In June 1940 Rotterdam was planning to celebrate its six hundredth birthday, and the Rotterdam Philharmonic planned a special program. However, on May 14 Nazi Germany bombed Rotterdam and nearly completely destroyed it, thereby launching its occupation of the Netherlands which lasted for the duration of World War II. The Doelen was destroyed, as was a rehearsal facility, along with most of the music library and all of the orchestra's instruments.

Despite the problems, the orchestra season finished according to plan, thanks to several other Dutch orchestras who gave concerts to raise money and helped with equipment and sheet music. The Koninginnekerk, one of the few churches that survived the bombing, became the new concert hall. During the occupation, the rules of the new Cultuurkamer, an organization meant to regulate the arts in the Nazi-occupied Netherlands, were severely restrictive and discriminatory. Every musician had to become a member of the Cultuurkamer, Jewish musicians had to be fired, and music by Jewish composers was banned, as was music from countries at war with Nazi Germany.

After the war, the orchestra lacked a permanent home until a new concert hall, also called the Doelen, was built in 1966. After Flipse retired as principal conductor in 1962, his successors were Franz Paul Decker (1962–1967) and Jean Fournet (1968–1973). In 1973, Edo de Waart became principal conductor, and served in the post until 1979. Under De Waart and David Zinman, who succeeded him as principal conductor from 1979 to 1982, the Rotterdam grew into an orchestra of international stature, making many recordings and successful international tours.

From 1983 to 1991, James Conlon was the RPhO's principal conductor. Jeffrey Tate succeeded Conlon, from 1991 to 1995. From 1995, Valery Gergiev served as principal conductor, and featured the orchestra in his Gergiev Festival presentations. Gergiev stepped down as principal conductor in August 2008, and subsequently took the title of eredirigent (honorary conductor) of the RPhO. He held this title until March 2022, when the RPhO terminated its artistic relationship with Gergiev, rescinded his title of eredirigent and discontinued its Gergiev Festival, following Gergiev's lack of denunciation of the 2022 Russian invasion of Ukraine.

In December 2006, the orchestra voted unanimously to name Yannick Nézet-Séguin as their 11th Principal Conductor, as of the 2008–2009 season, with an initial contract of 4 years. In April 2010, the RPhO announced the extension of Nézet-Séguin's contract through 2015. In June 2013, the RPhO further extended his contract through the summer of 2018. In May 2015, the RPhO announced the scheduled conclusion of Nézet-Séguin's tenure as principal conductor at the end of the 2017–2018 season. Nézet-Séguin now has the title of Eredirigent with the RPhO.

In June 2016, Lahav Shani made his first guest-conducting appearance with the RPhO. On the basis of this concert, in August 2016, the RPhO unanimously elected Shani as its next chief conductor, effective with the 2018–2019 season, with an initial contract of 5 years. Shani is the youngest conductor ever to be named chief conductor of the RPhO. In March 2020, the RPhO announced the extension of Shani's contract as chief conductor through August 2026. In January 2023, the RPhO announced that Shani is to conclude his tenure as its chief conductor at the close of the 2025–2026 season.

Past principal guest conductors of the RPhO included Jirí Belohlávek, who held the title from the 2012–2013 season until his death on 31 May 2017. In May 2022, Tarmo Peltokoski first guest-conducted the RPhO. On the basis of this appearance, the RPhO announced the appointment of Peltokoski as its next principal guest conductor, effective with the 2023–2024 season, with an initial contract of 4 years.

The RPhO has made commercial recordings for such labels as Philips, EMI, BIS, and Deutsche Grammophon.

== List of principal conductors ==
- Willem Feltzer (1918–1928)
- Alexander Schmuller (1928–1930)
- Eduard Flipse (1930–1962)
- Franz Paul Decker (1962–1967)
- Jean Fournet (1968–1973)
- Edo de Waart (1973–1979)
- David Zinman (1979–1982)
- James Conlon (1983–1991)
- Jeffrey Tate (1991–1995)
- Valery Gergiev (1995–2008)
- Yannick Nézet-Séguin (2008–2018)
- Lahav Shani (2018–2026)
