= Latvian National Symphony Orchestra =

Latvian symphony orchestra

- Orchestra
- Native name: Latvijas Nacionālais simfoniskais orķestris
- Former name: Latvian Radio Centre Orchestra; Latvian RSO
- Founded: 1926
- Location: Riga, Latvia
- Concert hall: Great Guild Hall, Riga
- Principal conductor: Tarmo Peltokoski
- Website: www.lnso.lv/home

The Latvian National Symphony Orchestra (LNSO; Latvian: Latvijas Nacionālais simfoniskais orķestris) is a Latvian orchestra based in Riga. Its primary performance venue is the Great Guild Hall in Riga. In addition to regular symphonic concerts, the orchestra also broadcasts and records.

== History ==
The orchestra was founded in 1926 as the Latvian Radio Centre Orchestra, with Arvīds Pārups as its founding music director, and was the first permanent orchestra in the country. The LNSO is a six-time winner of the Latvian Grand Music Award (1993, 2009, 2012, 2013, 2016 and 2019).

From 2013 the music director of the LNSO was Andris Poga. He concluded his chief conductorship of the LNSO at the close of the 2021-2022 season. In May 2021, the LNSO announced the appointment of Kristiina Poska as its next principal guest conductor, the first female conductor to be named to the post, effective in the autumn of 2021, with an initial contract of two seasons, which has been extended since.

In January 2022, Tarmo Peltokoski first guest-conducted the LNSO. In May 2022, the LNSO announced the appointment of Peltokoski as its next music director and artistic director, effective with the 2022-2023 season.

== Music Directors and Chief Conductors ==
- Arvīds Pārups (1926–1928)
- Jānis Mediņš (1929–1944)
- Dmitrijs Kuļkovs (1945–1949)
- Edgars Tons (1963–1966)
- Leonīds Vīgners (1949–1963, 1966–1974)
- Vassily Sinaisky (1975–1987)
- Paul Mägi (1990–1994)
- Terje Mikkelsen (1997–2001)
- Olari Elts (2001–2005)
- Karel Mark Chichon (2009–2012)
- Andris Poga (2013–2021)
- Tarmo Peltokoski (2022–present)
