= Olari Elts =

Estonian conductor (born 1971)

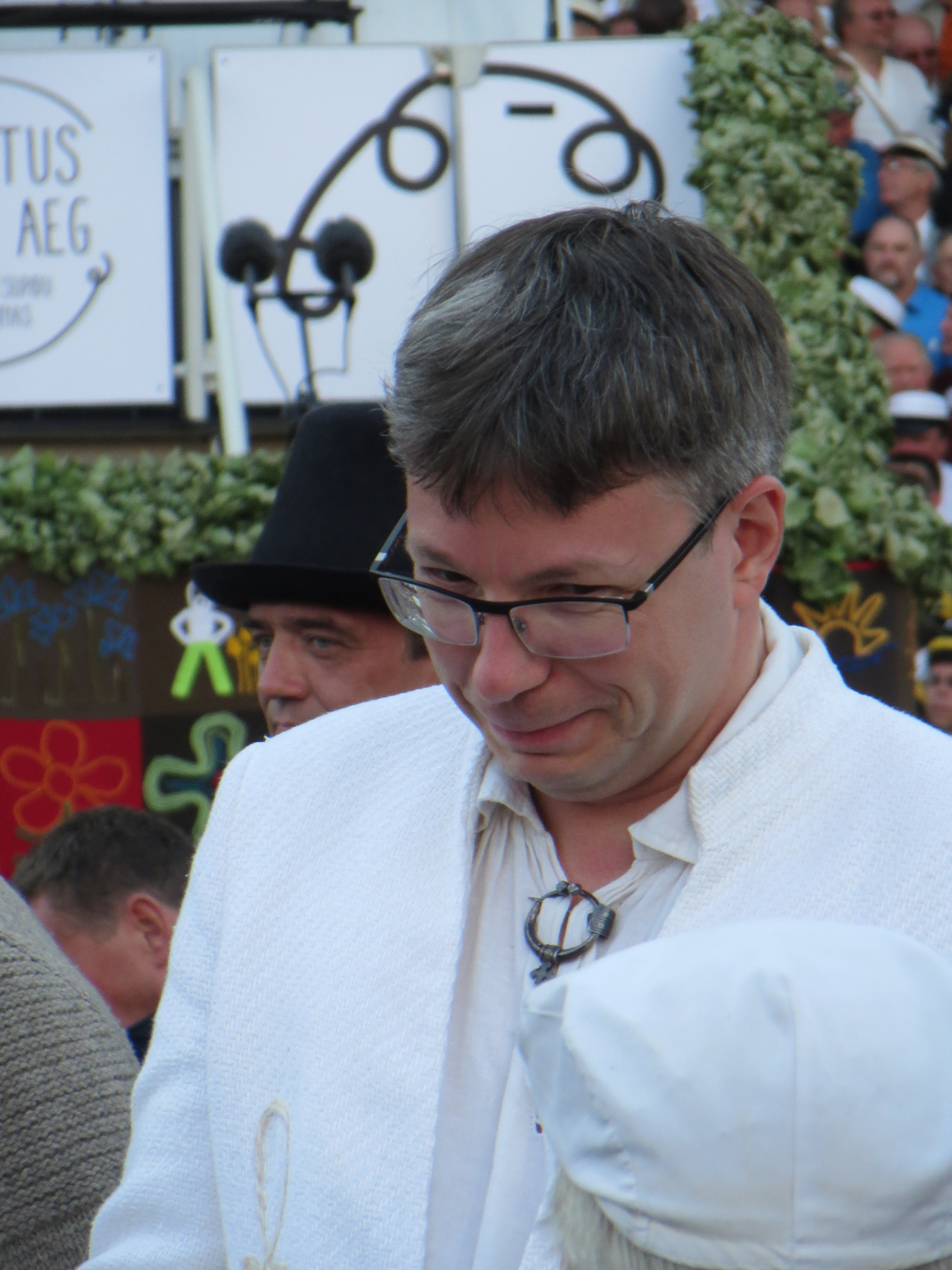
Elts at XXVI Estonian Song Celebration 2014

Olari Elts (born April 27, 1971 in Tallinn) is an Estonian conductor. He is currently artistic director of the NYYD Ensemble, and music director and chief conductor of the Estonian National Symphony Orchestra.

== Biography ==
Elts is the son of a theatre director and a dance teacher, He studied music at Tallinn Music High School and at the Estonian Academy of Music and Theatre. His initial conducting studies focused on choral conducting. His conducting mentors included Kuno Areng, Roman Matsov, Paul Mägi, and Eri Klas. He continued his music education at the University of Music and Performing Arts Vienna from 1994 to 1996, where he further studied conducting with Uroš Lajovic.

In 1993, Elts founded the Estonian contemporary music ensemble NYYD Ensemble, and continues to serve as its artistic director. From 2001 to 2006, Elts was chief conductor of the Latvian National Symphony Orchestra.

Outside of the Baltic states, Elts made his American guest-conducting debut with the Cincinnati Symphony Orchestra in February 2005. From 2006 to 2010, Elts served as artistic advisor of the Orchestre National de Bretagne. From 2007 to 2010, he was principal guest conductor of the Scottish Chamber Orchestra.

In 2007, Elts became principal guest conductor of the Estonian National Symphony Orchestra. From 2018 to 2022, he was artistic advisor of the Kymi Sinfonietta. In December 2019, the Estonian National Symphony Orchestra announced the appointment of Elts to the posts of its music director and chief conductor, effective with the 2020-2021 season, with an initial contract of three seasons. In September 2023, the orchestra announced the extension of Elts' contract as music director and chief conductor through the 2027-2028 season.

In May 2026, Sinfonietta Rīga announced the appointment of Elts as its next artistic director, effective with the 2026-2027 season.

== Honours and awards ==
In 2001, Elts was awarded the IVth Class Order of the White Star by Estonia in recognition for his contributions to music. His additional honours include the Cultural Award of the Republic of Estonia (2004) and the Latvian Grand Music Award (2005).

Cultural offices
Preceded by Terje Mikkelsen	Chief Conductor, Latvian National Symphony Orchestra; 2001–2006	Succeeded by Karel Mark Chichon
Preceded by Neeme Järvi	Music Director and Chief Conductor, Estonian National Symphony Orchestra; 2020–present	Succeeded by incumbent
