= Ilya Musin (conductor) =

Russian conductor (1904–1999)

Ilya Aleksandrovich Musin (Russian: Илья́ Алекса́ндрович Му́син, IPA: [ɪˈlʲja ɐlʲɪˈksandrəvʲɪtɕ ˈmusʲɪn]; 6 January 1904 [O.S. 24 December 1903] – 6 June 1999) was a Soviet and Russian conductor, music teacher and a theorist of conducting.

== Life and career ==
Musin was born in the provincial town of Kostroma. His mother died when he was 6; his father, a watchmaker and music lover, encouraged him to become a pianist.

Musin first studied conducting under Nicolai Malko and Alexander Gauk. He became assistant to Fritz Stiedry with the Saint Petersburg Philharmonic Orchestra in 1934. The Soviet government later sent him to lead the Belarusian State Academic Symphony Orchestra, but then curtailed his conducting career because he never joined the Soviet Communist Party.

He spent 1941–45 in Tashkent, Uzbekistan, where most Russian intellectuals were kept safe during the war. There he continued conducting and teaching. On June 22, 1942, the anniversary of the Nazi invasion, he conducted Shostakovich's Leningrad Symphony.

In 1932 Musin was invited to teach conducting at the Saint Petersburg Conservatory, then known as the Leningrad Conservatory. There he developed a comprehensive theoretical system to enable the student to communicate with the orchestra with the hands, requiring minimal verbal instruction, which is still referred to as the "Leningrad school of conducting". No one had previously created such a detailed and clear system of conducting gestures. His own early experiences as a student had prompted him to study the intricacies of manual technique: when Musin had tried to enter Malko's conducting class at the Leningrad Conservatory in 1926, he had been denied entrance because of poor manual technique. He was eventually accepted into Malko's class, and became an authority on manual technique, describing his system in his book The Technique of Conducting (Техника дирижирования).

Musin described the main principle of his method in these words: "A conductor must make music visible to his musicians with his hands. There are two components to conducting, expressiveness and exactness. These two components are in dialectical opposition to each other; in fact, they cancel each other out. A conductor must find the way to bring the two together."

== Notable students ==
Musin taught for over sixty years, his best-known students include: Yuri Temirkanov, Valery Gergiev, Rudolf Barshai, Semyon Bychkov, Mariss Jansons, Tugan Sokhiev, Teodor Currentzis, Vassily Sinaisky, Sian Edwards, Martyn Brabbins, Oleg Caetani, Juraj Valčuha, Alexander Polishchuk, Konstantin Simeonov, Odysseas Dimitriadis, Vladislav Chernushenko, Victor Fedotov, Leonid Shulman, Arnold Katz, Andrei Chistyakov, Alexander Walker, Ennio Nicotra, Ricardo Chiavetta, Leonid Korchmar, Mikhail Agrest, Oleg Proskurnya i Michał Klauza.

== Appearances in the West ==
In 1994, he gave masterclasses at the Royal Academy of Music in London where he returned for a number of years. He also gave masterclasses at Royal Northern College of Music, and conducted at the Barbican alongside Sian Edwards.

From 1992 to 1995, he taught at the Estate Musicale Chigiana summer school in Siena, Italy.

== Books ==
- Ilya Musin, The Technique of Conducting (Техника дирижирования), Muzyka Publishing House, Moscow, 1967
- The Education of a Conductor (О воспитании дирижера) 1987
- Lessons of life (Уроки жизни) 1995
- The Language of the Conductor's Gesture (Язык дирижёрского жеста), Muzyka Publishing House, Moscow, 2007
- Ilya Musin, The Technique of Conducting - English Translation by Oleg Proskurnya, Edwin Mellen Press, 2014
- The Language of the Conductor’s Gesture (Язык дирижёрского жеста) - Translated into English by Daniel Boico, Sfera Publishing, 2023
