= Jaap van Zweden =

Dutch conductor and violinist

Jaap van Zweden SBS
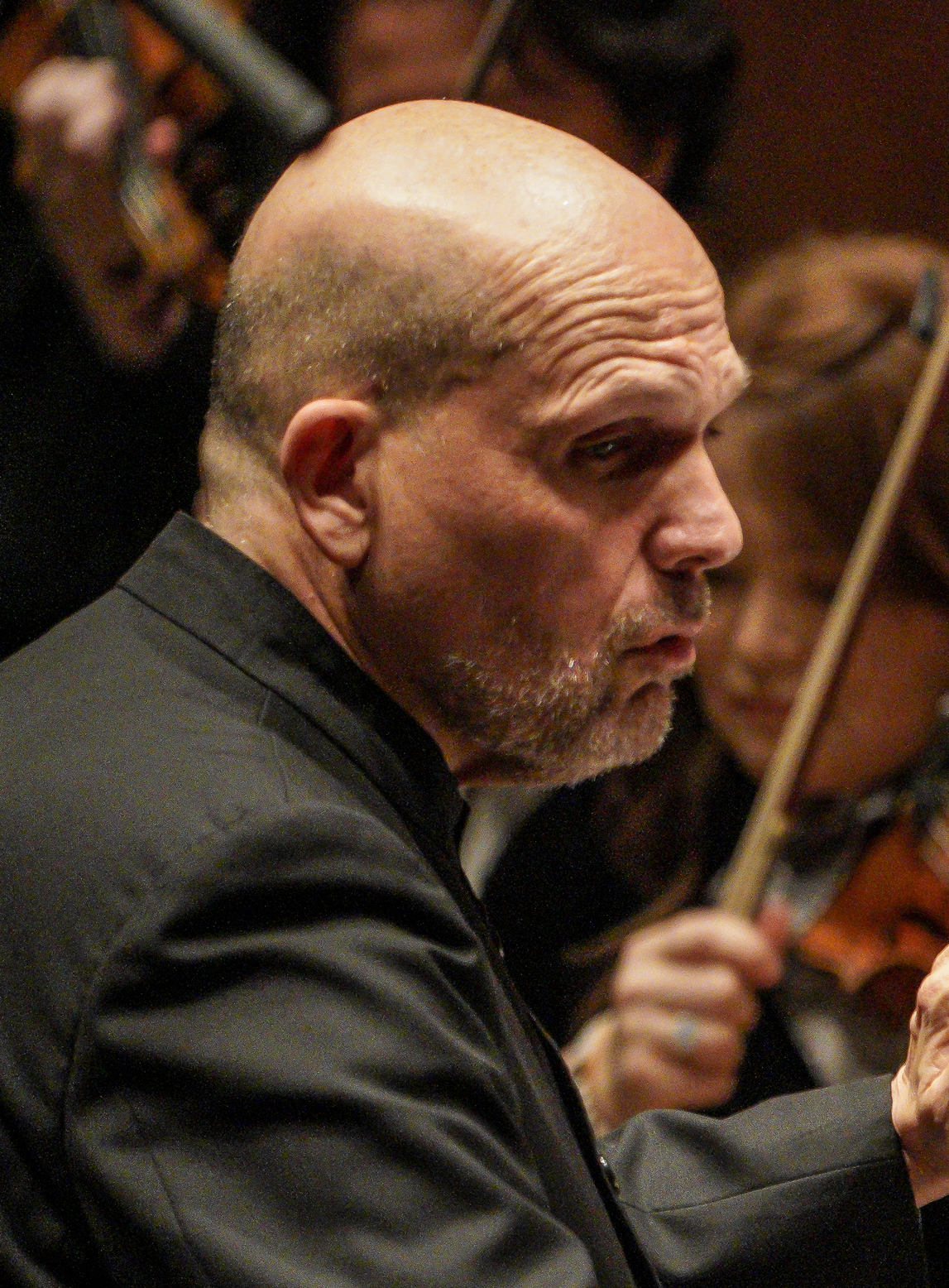
- Van Zweden in 2020
- Born: 12 December 1960 (age 65); Amsterdam, Netherlands
- Occupations: Conductor; violinist
- Website: www.jaapvanzweden.com

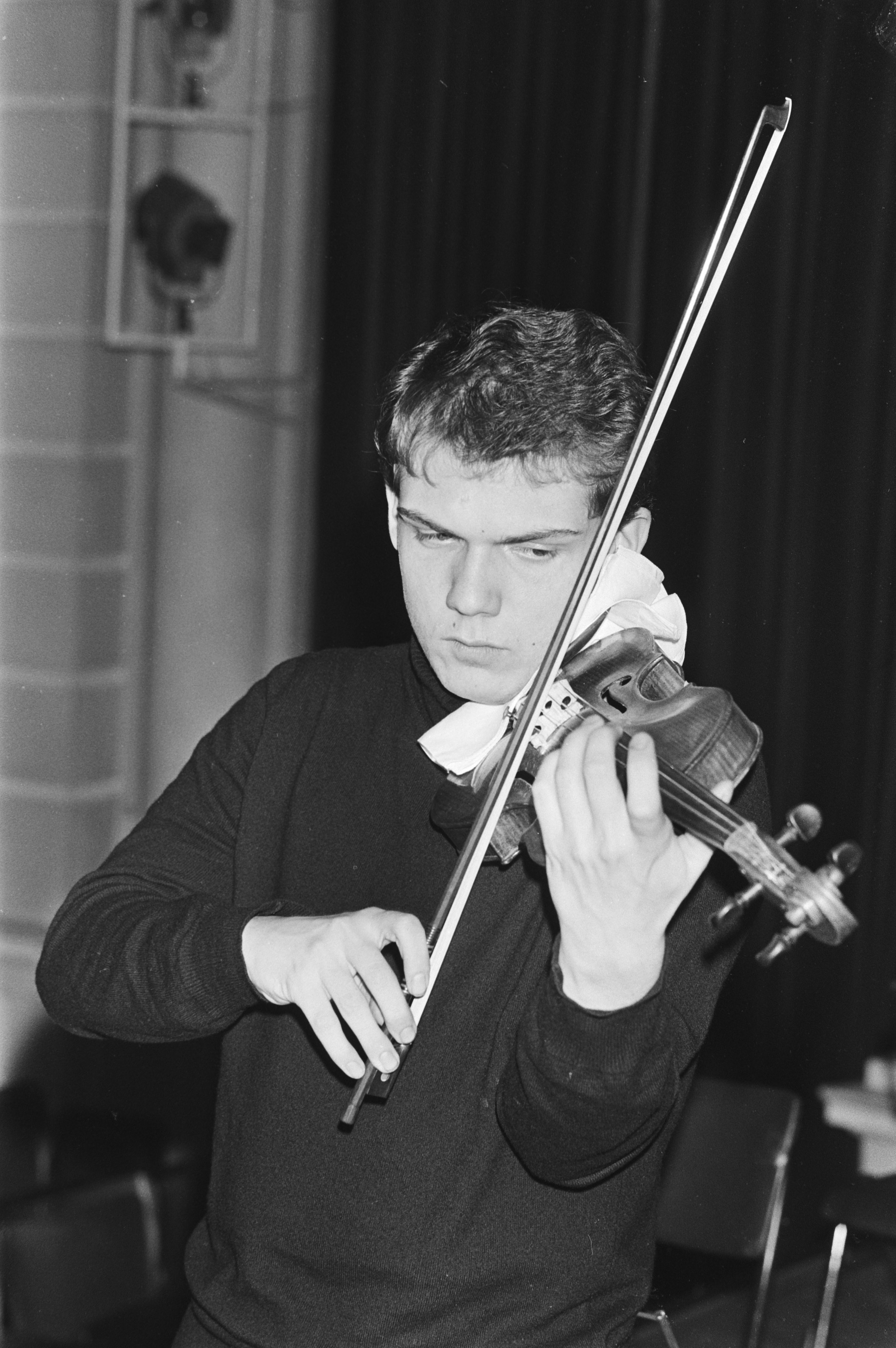
Van Zweden in 1981

Jaap van Zweden SBS (Dutch pronunciation: [ˈjaːp fɑn ˈzʋeːdə(n)]; born 12 December 1960) is a Dutch conductor and violinist. He is currently music director of the Seoul Philharmonic and music director of the Orchestre Philharmonique de Radio France.

== Biography ==
Van Zweden was born in Amsterdam, Netherlands. His father, a pianist, encouraged him to begin violin studies at age five, and he studied music in Amsterdam. At age 15, he won the Oskar Back violin competition; this allowed him to attend the Juilliard School, where he studied with Dorothy DeLay.

=== Career ===
In 1979, at age 19, van Zweden became concertmaster of the Royal Concertgebouw Orchestra in Amsterdam. He was the youngest violinist ever to assume that position. He performed as a soloist with many other orchestras as well.

Van Zweden began to work as a conductor after Leonard Bernstein invited him to lead an orchestra rehearsal in Berlin. He has said that he learned much about conducting from observing the various conductors who led Concertgebouw Orchestra concerts. He conducted smaller ensembles initially, and became a full-time conductor in 1997. His first Dutch conducting post was as chief conductor with the Orkest van het Oosten (Orchestra of the East, or the Netherlands Symphony Orchestra) in Enschede, the Netherlands. He served in this post from 1996 through 2000. Van Zweden was chief conductor of the Residentie Orchestra in The Hague from 2000 until 2005, and he recorded the complete symphonies of Ludwig van Beethoven with them. In 2005 he became chief conductor and artistic leader of the Radio Filharmonisch Orkest (RFO; Netherlands Radio Philharmonic) in Hilversum. In 2007, he extended his RFO contract through 2013. In 2010, the orchestra announced that van Zweden would step down from the RFO chief conductorship in 2012 and take the position of honorary guest conductor. Van Zweden served as chief conductor of the Antwerp Symphony Orchestra from 2008 to 2011.

Outside Europe, van Zweden made his U.S. conducting debut with the St. Louis Symphony in 1996. His second U.S. guest-conducting appearance was in 2006 with the Dallas Symphony Orchestra, and was highly acclaimed. Based on it, the Dallas Symphony named van Zweden its next music director after Andrew Litton, effective with the 2008–2009 season. His initial contract was for four years, where in the first year he was scheduled to conduct 12 weeks of subscription concerts and then for 15 weeks in the subsequent three years. For the 2007–2008 season, he held the title of music director-designate. In 2009, the Dallas Symphony announced the extension of his contract through the 2015–2016 season. In 2013, the orchestra announced a further extension of his contract through 2019. In 2016, the Dallas Symphony announced a revised conclusion of van Zweden's tenure for the close of the 2017–2018 season, one season earlier than his most recent contract. With the 2018–2019 season, van Zweden took the title of conductor laureate of the Dallas Symphony for the period from 2018 until 2021.

In 2012, the Hong Kong Philharmonic Orchestra (HK Phil) announced van Zweden's appointment as its next music director, with an initial contract of four years, starting 1 August 2012. He made his debut as the orchestra's music director on 28 September 2012. In 2016, van Zweden extended his contract with the HK Phil through the 2021–2022 season. In 2020, the HK Phil announced the extension of his contract through the 2023–2024 season, after which he concluded his HK Phil tenure. He now has the title of conductor laureate with the orchestra.

Van Zweden first guest-conducted the New York Philharmonic in April 2012. He returned for subsequent engagements in November 2014 and October 2015. In 2016, the New York Philharmonic announced his appointment as its music director effective with the 2018–2019 season, with an initial contract of five years. Van Zweden served as music director-designate for the 2017–2018 season. In 2021, van Zweden announced his intention to stand down from the New York Philharmonic at the close of the 2023–2024 season. He gave his final performance with the New York Philharmonic at Bravo! Vail on 20 July 2024.

In 2022, the Seoul Philharmonic Orchestra announced van Zweden's appointment as its music director, effective January 2024, with an initial contract of five years. In November 2023, van Zweden first guest-conducted the Orchestre Philharmonique de Radio France. In February 2024, the Orchestre Philharmonique de Radio France announced the appointment of van Zweden as its next music director, effective with the 2026–2027 season, with an initial contract of five years.

=== Personal life ===
Since 1983, van Zweden has been married to the artist Aaltje van Zweden–van Buuren. They have four children: a daughter, Anna-Sophia, and three sons, Daniel, Benjamin and Alexander. The van Zwedens have a particular interest in autism, as their son Benjamin is autistic. In 2000, they established the Papageno Foundation to provide autistic children with music therapy.

At various points in his career, orchestra members have described personality conflicts with van Zweden, which he has acknowledged.

Cultural offices
Preceded by Yevgeny Svetlanov	Chief Conductor, Residentie Orchestra; 2000–2005	Succeeded by Neeme Järvi
Preceded by Edo de Waart	Chief Conductor, Netherlands Radio Philharmonic Orchestra; 2005–2012	Succeeded by Markus Stenz
Preceded by Daniele Callegari	Chief Conductor, DeFilharmonie; 2008–2011	Succeeded by Edo de Waart
Preceded by Edo de Waart	Music Director, Hong Kong Philharmonic Orchestra; 2012–2024	Succeeded by Tarmo Peltokoski
Preceded by Osmo Vänskä	Music Director, Seoul Philharmonic; 2024–current	Succeeded by incumbent
Preceded by Mikko Franck	Music Director, Orchestre Philharmonique de Radio France; 2026–current	Succeeded by incumbent
