= Hong Kong Philharmonic Orchestra =

Symphony orchestra based in Hong Kong

- Orchestra
- Native name: 香港管弦樂團
- Short name: HKPO, HKPhil
- Former name: Sino-British Orchestra
- Founded: 1957
- Location: Hong Kong
- Concert hall: Hong Kong Cultural Centre
- Music director: Tarmo Peltokoski
- Website: hkphil.org

The Hong Kong Philharmonic Orchestra (Chinese: 香港管弦樂團; Jyutping: hoeng1 gong2 gun2 jin4 lok6 tyun4) is a symphony orchestra based in Hong Kong. Colloquially referred to as the HKPO or HKPhil (港樂), the orchestra was first established in 1947 as an amateur orchestra under the name Sino-British Orchestra (中英管弦樂團), it was renamed the Hong Kong Philharmonic Orchestra in 1957 and became a professional orchestra in 1974 under the funding of the government.

== History ==
=== Sino-British Orchestra ===
The Sino-British Club was an organisation founded in 1946, aimed at promoting harmony among different groups in Hong Kong (especially British and native Hong Kongers) through cultural activities. Various groups were found under the club, including drama, literature, film, and music.

In 1947, Anthony Braga, one of the leaders of the music group of the Sino-British Club, suggested to form a symphony orchestra to gather instrumentalists in the city and provide musical performance to the citizens, as the society was still recovering from the World War II. About 20 amateur musicians were found, and a chamber orchestra was formed quickly. Weekly rehearsal started in the summer.

Solomon Bard, a violinist who just finished his medical degree in the UK, returned to Hong Kong in the autumn of 1947, and was invited by Braga to be the conductor of the orchestra. Bard took over the orchestra, and conducted its debut performance on 30 April 1948 in St. Stephen's Girls' College.

=== Arrigo Foa ===
Bard continued his directorship of the orchestra after the debut. In 1953, Bard invited the Italian violinist and conductor Arrigo Foa to take over the orchestra, and Bard worked as the concertmaster and deputy conductor of the Orchestra.

Foa was a professional musician who joined Shanghai Municipal Orchestra as concertmaster in 1919. He succeeded Mario Paci as the conductor of the Shanghai orchestra in 1942, under the Japanese occupation. Foa migrated to Hong Kong in 1953 and led the orchestra immediately. He led the orchestra to play a critically acclaimed concert with pianist Louis Kentner.

Under the professional training of Foa, the orchestra improved rapidly, and gained a higher reputation in the city. Collaborating artists included pianist Julius Katchen and violinist Ruggiero Ricci.

=== Hong Kong Philharmonic Orchestra ===
In 1957, members of the orchestra decided to separate the group from Sino-British Club. As an independent organisation, the orchestra was renamed to the Hong Kong Philharmonic Orchestra, and registered as the Hong Kong Philharmonic Society. Most of the musicians remained, and Foa and Bard stayed on the same positions in the new ensemble.

In 1974, the Hong Kong Philharmonic Orchestra became the first professional orchestra in Hong Kong, while the Sino-British Club dismissed in the same year. Kek-tjiang Lim was the orchestra's first music director with the ensemble in professional status, from 1974 to 1975. In February 1986, the HKPO made its debut tour of several cities in the People's Republic of China, with conductor Kenneth Schermerhorn and soloists Stephanie Chase (violin) and Li Jian (piano). In the autumn of 1995, the HKPO travelled to nine cities in the United States and Canada in its North American début under conductor David Atherton. In 2003, the orchestra made its European début with performances in London's Barbican Hall, Belfast, Dublin and Paris (Théâtre des Champs-Élysées).

The orchestra's longest-serving music director was Jaap van Zweden, from 2012 to 2024. In June 2023, Tarmo Peltokoski first guest-conducted the orchestra. In July 2024, the orchestra announced the appointment of Peltokoski as its next music director, effective with the 2026-2027 season, with an initial contract of four years. He held the title of music director-designate for the 2025-2026 season.

The orchestra's current chief executive is Bernhard Fleischer, succeeding Benedikt Fohr who stepped down at the end of 2024-2025 season.

In addition to classical performances, the orchestra occasionally appears backing local pop stars such as Hacken Lee, Jacky Cheung, Frances Yip, Teresa Carpio, Leehom Wang and Hins Cheung.

== Recording history ==
The orchestra made its debut recording under the label Philips in 1978. Its repertoire includes Butterfly Lovers' Violin Concerto and selected Chinese orchestral works, under the baton of Hans Gunther Mommer. In the 1980s, the orchestra made a serious recording for HK Records. Recordings were also made for the label Marco Polo after Klaus Heymann founded Naxos.

Under the directorship of David Atherton, several recordings were released on Virgin Classics and GMN. In 1997, the orchestra was featured in Tan Dun's album Heaven Earth Mankind: Symphony 1997 (Sony Classical Records), as a celebration for the handover of Hong Kong.

The orchestra started a four-year project in 2015, making it the first Hong Kong and mainland Chinese orchestra to perform Wagner's The Ring of the Nibelung. The four operas were performed, one per year, in concert and recorded live for the Naxos label.

Each year, the orchestra holds a crossover concert with selected cantopop singers. Live recordings are made after each production. Since the concert of Michael Kwan (conducted by Joseph Koo) in 1982, the most successful concert has been the live recording of the concert with Jacky Cheung (conducted by Yip Wing-sie) in 1996.

== Performance venues ==
After the reorganization from the Sino-British Orchestra into the Hong Kong Philharmonic Orchestra in 1957, the orchestra played the first concert in Loke Yew Hall, the University of Hong Kong. Hong Kong City Hall Concert Hall was the performance venue of the orchestra in its early years. The orchestra was the first to perform in the Hong Kong Cultural Centre after the venue's opening in 1989, participating in the International Celebration of the Arts, which was a festival to open the centre. Since then, Hong Kong Philharmonic has been the most frequent orchestra to perform in the venue. The orchestra officially became the venue partner of Hong Kong Cultural Centre in 2009.

The orchestra also gives an annual outdoor performance, 'Symphony Under the Stars', Hong Kong's largest outdoor symphonic concert, which attracts thousands of participants every year. Venues include the Happy Valley Racecourse and the New Central Harbourfront.

== Conductors ==
=== Sino-British Orchestra (1947–1957) ===
- Solomon Bard (1947–1953)
- Arrigo Foa (1953–1957)

=== Hong Kong Philharmonic Orchestra (1957-Present) ===
==== Music Directors (amateur era) ====
- Arrigo Foa (1957–1969)
- Kek-tjiang Lim (1969–1974)

==== Music Directors (professional era) ====
- Kek-tjiang Lim (1974–1975)
- Hans-Gunther Mommer (1975–1978)
- Ling Tung (1979–1981)
- Kenneth Schermerhorn (1984–1989)
- David Atherton (1989–2000)
- Samuel Wong (2000–2003, music director; 2003–2005, principal conductor)
- Edo de Waart (2004–2012, artistic director and chief conductor)
- Jaap van Zweden (2012–2024)
- Tarmo Peltokoski (2026–present)

==== Conductor Laureate ====
- David Atherton (2000–2009)

==== Principal Guest Conductors ====
- Maxim Shostakovich (1982–1985)
- Kenneth Jean (1984–1993)
- Yu Long (2015–present)

==== Resident Conductors ====
- John-Szicheng Lau (1984–1986)
- Wing-sie Yip (1986–2000)
- Harmen Cnossen (2005–2006)
- Lio Kuokman (2020-present)

==== Assistant Conductors ====
- Perry So (2008–2010)
- Vivian Ip (2016–2018)
- Gerard Salonga (2016–2018)
- Janis Stafeckis (2026)

==== Associate Conductors ====
- Perry So (2010–2012)

==== Artistic Partners ====
- Daniele Gatti (2024-present)
