= Vassily Sinaisky =

Russian conductor (born 1947)

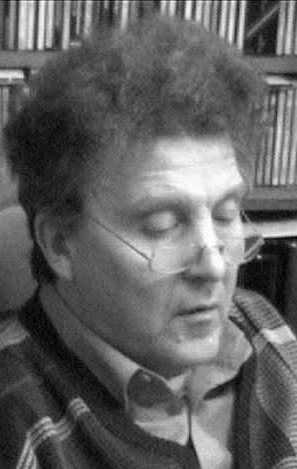
Sinaisky in 2006

Vassily Serafimovich Sinaisky (Russian: Васи́лий Серафи́мович Сина́йский; born April 20, 1947) is a Russian conductor and pianist.

== Biography ==
Sinaisky studied conducting with Ilya Musin at the Leningrad Conservatory and began his career as assistant to Kirill Kondrashin at the Moscow Philharmonic Orchestra.

Sinaisky was Chief Conductor of the Latvian National Symphony Orchestra from 1976 to 1989. He served as music director and principal conductor of the Moscow Philharmonic Orchestra from 1991 to 1996. He has also held the post of principal guest conductor of the Netherlands Philharmonic Orchestra.

Sinaisky was principal guest conductor of the BBC Philharmonic from 1996 until January 2012. Sinaisky has made several recordings with the BBC Philharmonic for Chandos, including works by Karol Szymanowski, Rodion Shchedrin, Mily Balakirev, Nikolai Rimsky-Korsakov, and Franz Schreker, as well as a series of recordings of Dmitri Shostakovich's film music. Sinaisky now has the title of conductor emeritus with the BBC Philharmonic.

Sinaisky was principal conductor of the Malmö Symphony Orchestra from January 2007 through the 2010-2011 season. With the Malmö orchestra, he has conducted commercial recordings for the Naxos label, including music of Franz Schmidt. He became Conductor in Residence at the Bolshoi Theatre with the 2009-2010 season. In August 2010, he was named the Bolshoi's music director and chief conductor. In December 2013, Sinaisky resigned his posts with the Bolshoi Theatre, with immediate effect.

In December 2018, Sinaisky first guest-conducted the Janáček Philharmonic Orchestra. He returned for a second guest-conducting engagement at the start of the 2019-2020 season. In April 2020, the orchestra announced the appointment of Sinaisky as its next chief conductor, effective with the 2020-2021 season. Sinaisky concluded his chief conductorship of the Janáček Philharmonic Orchestra at the close of the 2023-2024 season.

== Recordings ==
- Shostakovich: Film Music Vol. 1. Chandos 10023
- Shostakovich: Film Music Vol. 2. Chandos 10183
- Schreker: Orchestral Works Vol. 1. Chandos 9797
- Schreker: Orchestral Works Vol. 2. Chandos 9951
- Balakirev: Symphony 1, Overture King Lear, In Bohemia. Chandos 24129
- Liadov: Baba Yaga, Enchanted Lake, Kikimora. Chandos 9911
- Dvořák: Slavonic Dance, The Water Goblin, Symphony No. 7. BBC Music MM60
- Tchaikovsky - Piano Concerto No. 1 in B-flat minor, Op. 23 / Grieg - Piano Concerto in A minor, Op. 16. Denis Kozhukhin, Vassily Sinaisky, Rundfunk-Sinfonieorchester Berlin. Pentatone PTC 5186566

Cultural offices
Preceded by Dmitri Kitaenko	Music Director, Moscow Philharmonic Orchestra; 1991–1996	Succeeded by Mark Ermler
Preceded by Christoph König	Chief Conductor, Malmö Symphony Orchestra; 2007–2011	Succeeded by Marc Soustrot
Preceded by Alexander Vedernikov	Music Director and Chief Conductor, Bolshoi Theatre; 2010–2013	Succeeded by Tugan Sokhiev
Preceded by Heiko Mathias Förtster	Chief Conductor, Janáček Philharmonic Orchestra; 2020–2024	Succeeded by Daniel Raiskin (designate, effective, 2026)
