= Tugan Sokhiev =

Russian conductor (born 1977)

Tugan Sokhiev Туган Сохиев
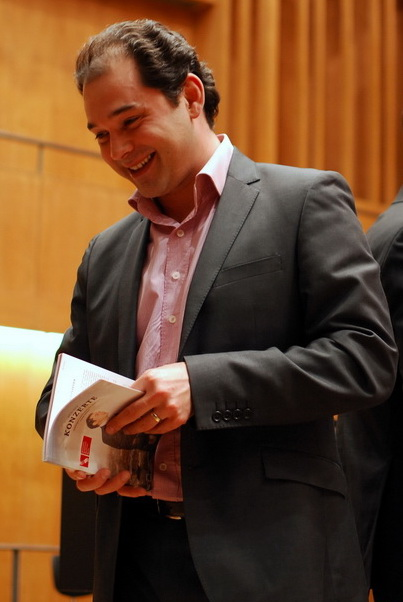
- Sokhiev in 2012

Background information
- Born: Tugan Taymurazovich Sokhiev; 21 October 1977 (age 49); Ordzhonikidze, North Ossetian ASSR, USSR (today Vladikavkaz, North Ossetia–Alania, Russia)
- Genre: Classical
- Occupation: Conductor
- Instrument: Piano

Tugan Taymurazovich Sokhiev (Iron Ossetic: Сохиты Таймуразы фырт Тугъан, romanized: Soxity Tajmurazy fyrt Tuhan; Russian: Туган Таймуразович Сохиев; born 21 October 1977) is a Russian conductor.

== Biography ==
Sokhiev began piano studies at age 7. He first conducted at age 17, inspired by Anatoly Briskin, the conductor of the North Ossetia State Philharmonic Orchestra. He subsequently attended the Saint Petersburg Conservatory, where he was one of the last students of Ilya Musin before the latter's death in 1999. Sokhiev's first opera as a conductor was in a production of La bohème in Iceland.

Following that production in Iceland, General Director of Welsh National Opera (WNO) Anthony Freud named Sokhiev WNO's music director in December 2001, effective from 2003, for an initial contract of 5 years. His initial conducting work with WNO as music director was in revivals of Don Giovanni, Cavalleria rusticana and Pagliacci. His first new production as WNO music director was of Eugene Onegin. He was also in charge of the Russian Series for WNO which contained works by many famous Russian composers. In August 2004, Sokhiev resigned from WNO with immediate effect, after problems with the cast of their new production of Verdi's La traviata. Reports indicated a decline in morale among the WNO orchestra and chorus, and questions about whether Sokhiev was too young and inexperienced for the post.

In 2005, Sokhiev became principal guest conductor and musical adviser with the Orchestre national du Capitole de Toulouse. He received the accolade 'Révélation musicale de l'année' from the French Critics' Union in 2005, after a Paris performance with the Capitole de Toulouse orchestra. In September 2008, he became the orchestra's music director. His most recent Capitole de Toulouse contract extension, announced in December 2019, was through the summer of 2021.

In September 2010, Sokhiev was named principal conductor and artistic director of the Deutsches Symphonie-Orchester Berlin (DSO Berlin), effective in 2012, with an initial contract of 4 years. He took the title of principal conductor designate with immediate effect. In January 2014, the Bolshoi Theatre named Sokhiev its new music director, with an initial contract of 4 years, effective 1 February 2014. In October 2014, Sokhiev stated his intention to stand down from his DSO Berlin post after the 2015–2016 season, to devote greater attention to his Bolshoi post. On 6 March 2022, Sokhiev resigned as both music director of the Bolshoi Theatre and music director of the Orchestre national du Capitole de Toulouse, citing pressure to condemn the 2022 Russian invasion of Ukraine.

Sokhiev first guest-conducted the Orchestre de la Suisse Romande (OSR) in 2024, and returned for an additional guest-conducting engagement in October 2025. In June 2026, the OSR announced the appointment of Sokhiev as its next principal conductor and artistic adviser, effective with the 2026–2027 season, with an initial contract of three seasons.

On 13 June 2025, Sokhiev conducted the Vienna Philharmonic Sommernachtskonzert for the first time. In January 2026, the Vienna Philharmonic announced Sokhiev as the scheduled conductor for its series of the New Year's Concert in late December 2026 and 1 January 2027.

In October 2026, the NHK Symphony Orchestra (NHK SO) announced the appointment of Sokhiev as its next music director, effective in September 2028. Sokhiev had first guest-conducted the NHK SO in October 2008.

== Discography ==
- Prokofiev: Symphonie No. 5, Scythian Suite, Deutsches Symphonie-Orchester Berlin, Sony Classical, Germany 2016, CD.
- Brahms: A Flight through the Orchestra – Brahms Symphony No. 2, Deutsches Symphonie-Orchester Berlin, EuroArts Music International, Germany 2015, DVD/Blu-ray.
- Prokofiev: Ivan the Terrible, Deutsches Symphonie-Orchester Berlin, Sony Classical, Germany 2014, CD.
- Stravinsky: L'oiseau de feu, Le sacre du printemps, Orchestre National du Capitole de Toulouse, Naïve, France 2012, CD.
- Prokofiev: Violin Concerto No. 2, Rachmaninoff: Symphonic Dances, Orchestre National du Capitole de Toulouse, Naïve, France, 2011, CD.
- Mussorgsky: Pictures at an Exhibition, Tchaikovsky: Symphony No. 4, Orchestre National du Capitole de Toulouse, Naïve, France 2006, CD.
- Prokofiev: Peter and the Wolf, Orchestre National du Capitole de Toulouse, Naïve, France 2007, CD.

Cultural offices
Preceded by Carlo Rizzi	Music Director, Welsh National Opera; 2003–2004	Succeeded by Carlo Rizzi
Preceded by Michel Plasson	Music Director, Orchestre national du Capitole de Toulouse; 2008–2022	Succeeded by Tarmo Peltokoski
Preceded by Ingo Metzmacher	Principal Conductor, Deutsches Symphonie-Orchester Berlin; 2012–2016	Succeeded by Robin Ticciati
Preceded by Vassily Sinaisky	Music Director, Bolshoi Theatre; 2014–2022	Succeeded by Valery Gergiev
