= Eduard Flipse =

Dutch conductor and composer (1896–1973)

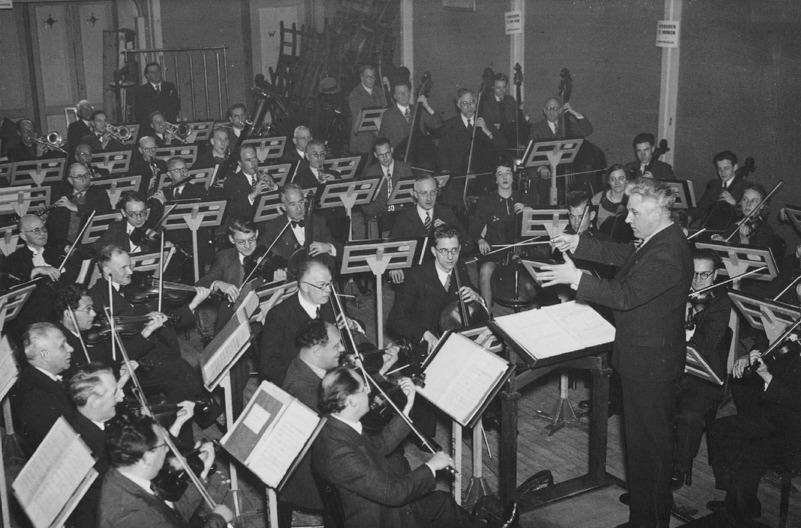
Eduard Flipse & Rotterdam Philharmonic Orchestra, 1930s

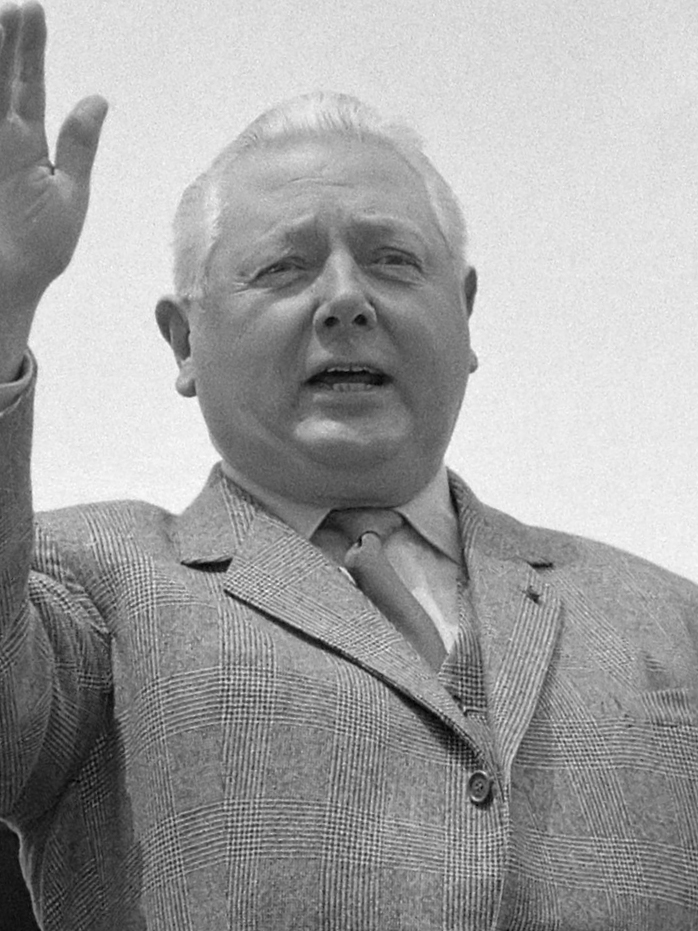
Eduard Flipse (1961)

Eduard Flipse (26 February 1896 in Wissenkerke – 12 September 1973 in Breda) was a Dutch conductor and composer, the son of Cornelis Flipse and Geertje Kruis. He was noted as a champion of the music of Dutch composers, such as Léon Orthel. He prepared the chorus for one of the earliest Dutch performances of William Walton's cantata Belshazzar's Feast. He was the first Dutch conductor of Igor Stravinsky's The Rite of Spring and Alban Berg’s Violin Concerto.

Flipse became the "second conductor" ("tweede dirigent") of the Rotterdam Philharmonic Orchestra in 1927, and in 1930, became the orchestra's principal conductor, serving until 1962. His recordings with the orchestra include a live performance from the 1955 Holland Festival of Gustav Mahler's Symphony No. 6. In his later years, Flipse was the first conductor of the Antwerp Philharmonic (precursor to the Royal Philharmonic Orchestra of Flanders and now called Antwerp Symphony Orchestra) from 1959 to 1970.

Flipse was married twice. His first marriage to Louise Francina Victoria Snel, from 1923 to 1940, produced a son, and ended in divorce. His second marriage was to Margaretha Cornelia Broeders, from 1942.

Cultural offices
Preceded by Alexander Schmuller	Principal Conductor, Rotterdam Philharmonic Orchestra; 1930–1962	Succeeded by Franz Paul Decker
