= Karel Mark Chichon =

British orchestra conductor (born 1971)

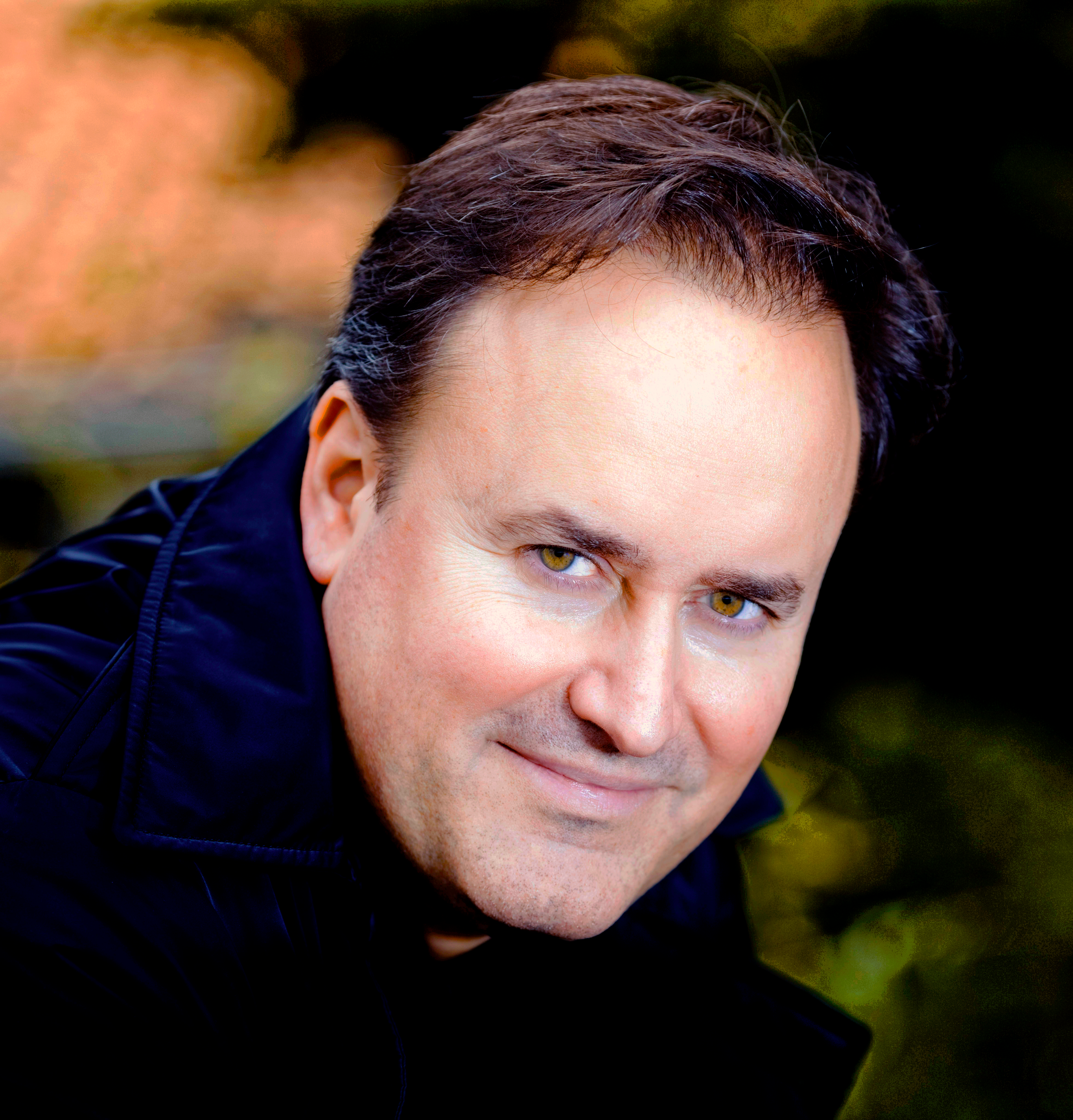
- Born: Karel Mark Chichon; 30 April 1971 (age 55); London, United Kingdom
- Occupation: Orchestra conductor
- Spouse: Elīna Garanča
- Children: Catherine Louise Chichon, Cristina Sophie Chichon
- Awards: Officer of the Order of the British Empire (OBE)

Karel Mark Chichon OBE FRAM (born 30 April 1971) is a British orchestra conductor.

== Biography ==
Born in London, Chichon studied at the Royal Academy of Music in London and at the Hochschule für Musik in Vienna under Leopold Hager. Karel Mark Chichon is Artistic Director and Principal Conductor of the Orquesta Filarmónica de Gran Canaria since May 2017, a position recently renewed until the 2026–2027 season.

Karel Mark Chichon is also Artistic Director of the Gibraltar Philharmonic Society,

== Career ==
From 2006 to 2009, Chichon was Chief Conductor of the Graz Symphony Orchestra. He was Chief Conductor and Artistic Director of the Latvian National Symphony Orchestra between 2009 and 2012. Chichon became Chief Conductor of the Deutsche Radio Philharmonie Saarbrücken Kaiserslautern (DRP) in September 2011. In March 2013, his initial contract was extended until the 2016–2017 season. In March 2015, Chichon and the orchestra jointly announced that his tenure would conclude at the end of the 2016–2017 season.

In the United States, Chichon made his Metropolitan Opera debut in February 2016 with performances of Madama Butterfly, including one cinema broadcast. In May 2017, he was appointed Artistic Director and Principal Conductor of the Orquesta Filarmónica de Gran Canaria, effective from the 2017–2018 season., a position that has been renewed three times until the 2026–2027 season.

== Discography ==
His commercial recordings include two albums for Deutsche Grammophon, Meditation and Habanera, both featuring his wife Elīna Garanča. In 2014, he recorded Dvořák’s Symphony No. 1 with the DRP for the Hänssler Classic label, the first in a projected cycle of all nine Dvořák symphonies.

Chichon was appointed Officer of the Order of the British Empire (OBE) in the 2012 Birthday Honours for services to music and culture in Gibraltar. In March 2016, he was named a Fellow of the Royal Academy of Music.

== Personal life ==
Chichon and Elīna Garanča have two daughters, Catherine Louise Chichon and Cristina Sophie Chichon, who are grandchildren of Harry Chichon and Leonor Chichon.

Cultural offices
Preceded by Olari Elts	Music Director, Latvian National Symphony Orchestra; 2009–2012	Succeeded by Andris Poga
Preceded by Christoph Poppen	Chief Conductor, Deutsche Radio Philharmonie Saarbrücken Kaiserslautern; 2011–2017	Succeeded by Pietari Inkinen
Preceded by Pedro Halffter	Chief Conductor, Orquesta Filarmónica de Gran Canaria; 2017–present	Succeeded by incumbent
