= Steven Sloane =

Israeli-American conductor (born 1958)

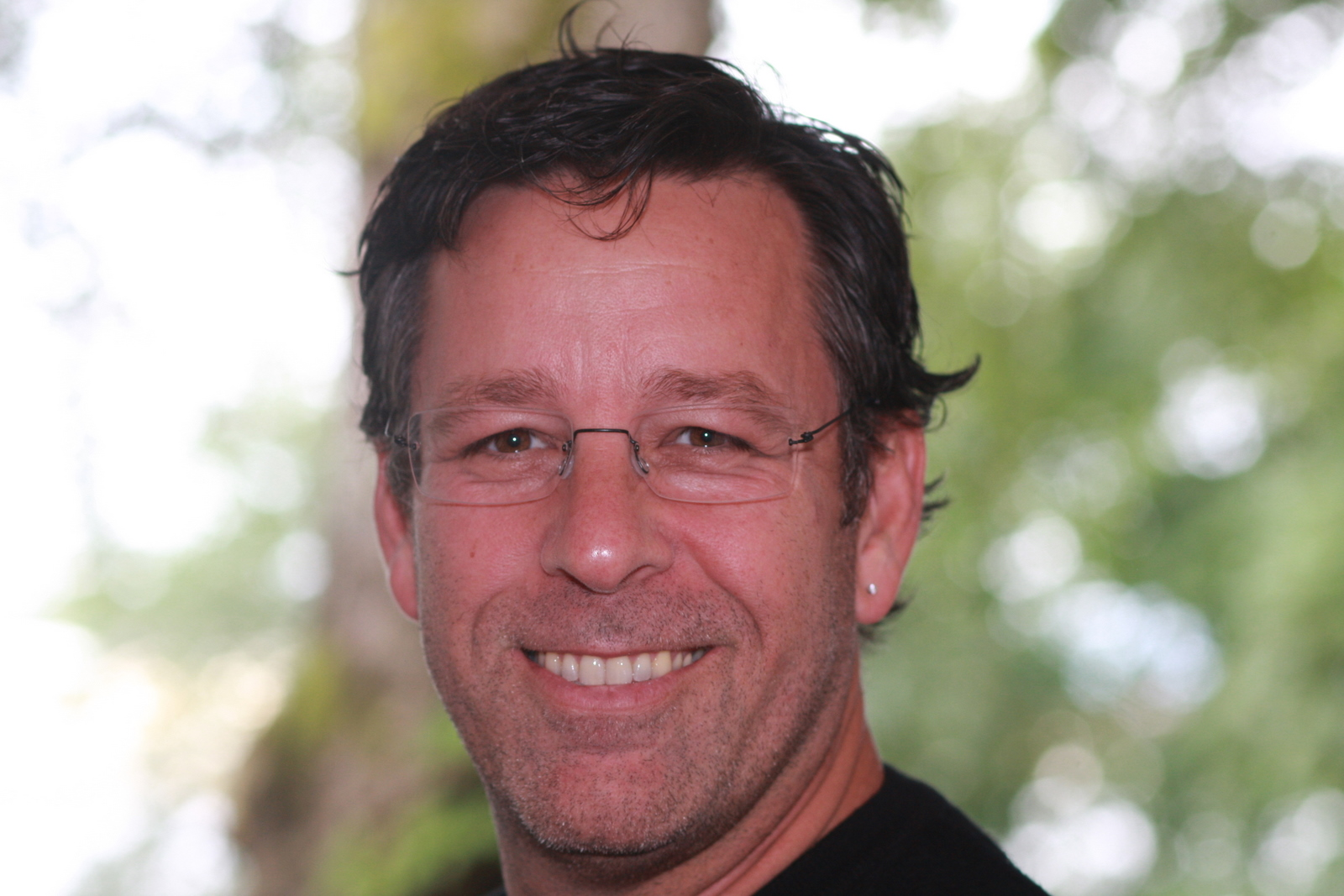
- Born: 1958 (age 67–68); Adelaide, South Australia, Australia
- Education: University of California, Los Angeles
- Occupation: Conductor
- Website: steven-sloane.com

Steven Sloane (born 1958) is an Israeli-American conductor.

== Biography ==
Born in Los Angeles, California, Sloane developed an interest in conducting at age 16. He graduated from the University of California, Los Angeles with a degree in music. Separately, he also took conducting lessons with Eugene Ormandy, Franco Ferrara and Gary Bertini. Sloane lived and worked for much of the 1980s in Israel.

From 1989 to 1994, Sloane was First Kapellmeister at the Oper Frankfurt. He was music director of the Bochum Symphony Orchestra (Bochumer Symphoniker) from 1994 to 2021. Simultaneously with his Bochum tenure, Sloane was Music Director of Opera North from 1999 to 2002, and was principal conductor of the Stavanger Symphony Orchestra from 2007 to 2013. Sloane was music director of the Jerusalem Symphony Orchestra from 2019 to 2023.

In the US, Sloane was music director of the Spoleto Festival USA from 1996 to 2000. In November 2000, Sloane was named music director of the American Composers Orchestra, effective with the 2002–2003 season. This appointment was unusual in that Sloane had never conducted the orchestra prior to his appointment, although he did meet several of the orchestra's musicians during their music director search prior to his appointment. Sloane did not conduct the orchestra for the first time until March 2002. He formally began his tenure with the orchestra in November 2002, and concluded his tenure with the orchestra in 2006.

Sloane was married to the violist Tabea Zimmermann. The couple have a daughter, Maya, born in 2003.

Cultural offices
Preceded by Eberhard Kloke	Generalmusikdirektor, Bochumer Symphoniker; 1994–2021	Succeeded by Tung-Chieh Chuang
Preceded by Paul Daniel	Music Director, Opera North; 1999–2002	Succeeded by Richard Farnes
Preceded by Dennis Russell Davies	Music Director, American Composers Orchestra; 2002–2006	Succeeded by George Manahan
Preceded by Susanna Mälkki	Principal Conductor, Stavanger Symphony Orchestra; 2007–2013	Succeeded by Christian Vásquez
Preceded by Frédéric Chaslin	Music Director, Jerusalem Symphony Orchestra; 2019–2023	Succeeded by Julian Rachlin
