= Christian Vásquez (conductor) =

Venezuelan conductor and violinist

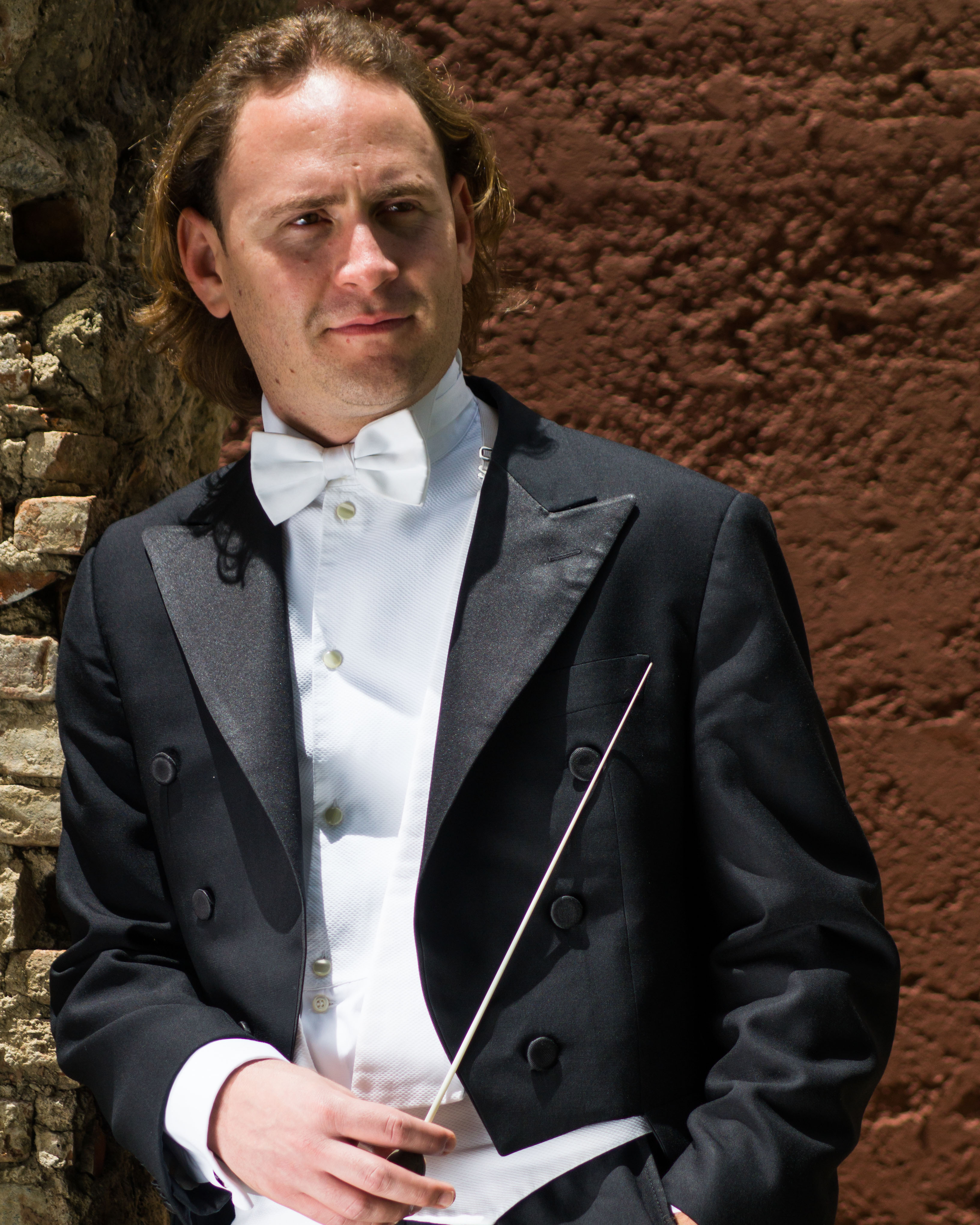
Image of Christian Vásquez

Christian Vásquez (born 1984, Caracas, Venezuela) is a Venezuelan conductor and violinist.

== Biography ==
Vásquez began to study violin at age 9, after being accepted to the El Sistema program in Venezuela, and he played in the Sinfónica Infantil de San Sebastián de los Reyes. In 2001, at age 17, he began conducting studies with José Antonio Abreu. In 2005, Vásquez became music director of the Sinfónica Juvenil de Aragua José Félix Ribas (José Felix Ribas Juvenile Symphony Orchestra of Aragua). In 2009, Vásquez was named a Gustavo Dudamel conducting fellow with the Los Angeles Philharmonic. He was the music director of the Teresa Carreño Youth Orchestra of Venezuela from 2010 to 2017.

In Europe, Vásquez first conducted the Gävle Symphony Orchestra in October 2009. In November 2010, he took up the post of principal guest conductor of the Gävle Symphony Orchestra, and held the post until 2013. Vásquez first appeared as a guest conductor with the Stavanger Symphony Orchestra (SSO) in March 2010. In September 2011, the SSO announced the appointment of Vásquez as its next chief conductor, as of the 2013-2014 season, for an initial contract of 4 years. He concluded his SSO tenure at the end of the 2018-2019 season. During this period, he became principal guest conductor of Het Gelders Orkest as of the 2015-2016 season.

Cultural offices
Preceded by Steven Sloane	Chief Conductor, Stavanger Symphony Orchestra; 2013-2019	Succeeded by Andris Poga
