= Deutsche Radio Philharmonie Saarbrücken Kaiserslautern =

German radio orchestra

German Radio Philharmonic Orchestra Saarbrücken Kaiserslautern
- Radio orchestra
- Native name: Deutsche Radio Philharmonie
- Short name: DRP
- Founded: 1937; 89 years ago
- Location: Saarbrücken
- Concert hall: Funkhaus Halberg
- Principal conductor: Josep Pons
- Website: www.drp-orchester.de/drp/index.html

The Deutsche Radio Philharmonie Saarbrücken Kaiserslautern (DRP; German Radio Philharmonic Orchestra Saarbrücken Kaiserslautern) is a German radio orchestra. Its administrative headquarters is in Saarbrücken, at the Funkhaus Halberg. The orchestra gives concerts at the Funkhaus Halberg and the Congresshalle in Saarbrücken, and at the Fruchthalle in Kaiserslautern.

== History ==
The precursor ensemble of the orchestra dates back to 1937. In 1946, under the French military administration, the Kaiserslautern Radio Orchestra (Funkorchester Kaiserslautern) was founded. Emmerich Smola became its principal conductor in 1948. Following its merger with the Koblenz Light Orchestra (Unterhaltungsorchester Koblenz) in 1951 as part of a reorganization of the broadcaster, the Rundfunkorchester Kaiserslautern for the Südwestfunk (Southwest Radio) was established under Smola’s direction. It operated alongside the broadcaster’s symphony orchestra and was known for sophisticated popular music and light classical repertoire.

Separately, by 1952, funding shortages at RIAS led to the downsizing of a full symphony orchestra in the Saarland region to a chamber orchestra. This was the Kammerorchester des Saarländischen Rundfunks, established in 1957. This chamber orchestra gave concerts until 1972. From 1968 to 1972, it was led by cellist Antonio Janigro, who had previously founded the Zagreb Soloists.

In 1973, the chamber orchestra merged with the Rundfunk-Sinfonieorchester Saarbrücken. With the consolidation of two German broadcasting networks, the Südwestfunk and SDR into the newly formed SWR, two separate orchestras from the former parent networks, the Rundfunk-Sinfonieorchester Saarbrücken of the Saarländischer Rundfunk (SR) and the Rundfunkorchester Kaiserslautern of the Südwestrundfunk were consolidated into a single ensemble, and given the new name of Deutsche Radio Philharmonie Saarbrücken Kaiserslautern (DRP) (2007). Christoph Poppen was the first chief conductor of the combined ensemble, serving through 2011.

Christoph Poppen served as principal conductor from 2007 until his contract expired in the summer of 2011. He was succeeded in the 2011/12 season by Gibraltar-born conductor Karel Mark Chichon, who stepped down in May 2017. Finnish conductor Pietari Inkinen took over as principal conductor at the start of the 2017/18 season, with an initial contract of 4 years. In January 2024, the orchestra announced simultaneously the scheduled departure of Inkinen as its chief conductor at the close of the 2024–2025 season, and the appointment of Josep Pons as its next chief conductor, effective with the 2025–2026 season.

== Chief conductors ==
- Rudolf Michl (1946–1971; SR)
- Hans Zender (1972–1984; SR)
- Myung-Whun Chung (1984–1990; SR)
- Marcello Viotti (1991–1995; SR)
- Michael Stern (1996–2000; SR)
- Günther Herbig (2001–2006; SR)
- Christoph Poppen (2006–2011; DRP)
- Karel Mark Chichon (2011–2017; DRP)
- Pietari Inkinen (2017–2025; DRP)
- Josep Pons (2025–present; DRP)

=== Principal guest conductors ===
- Stanisław Skrowaczewski (1994–2017)
- Michael Schønwandt (2025–present)

=== Conductors laureate ===
- Stanisław Skrowaczewski (2015–2017)

== Venues ==
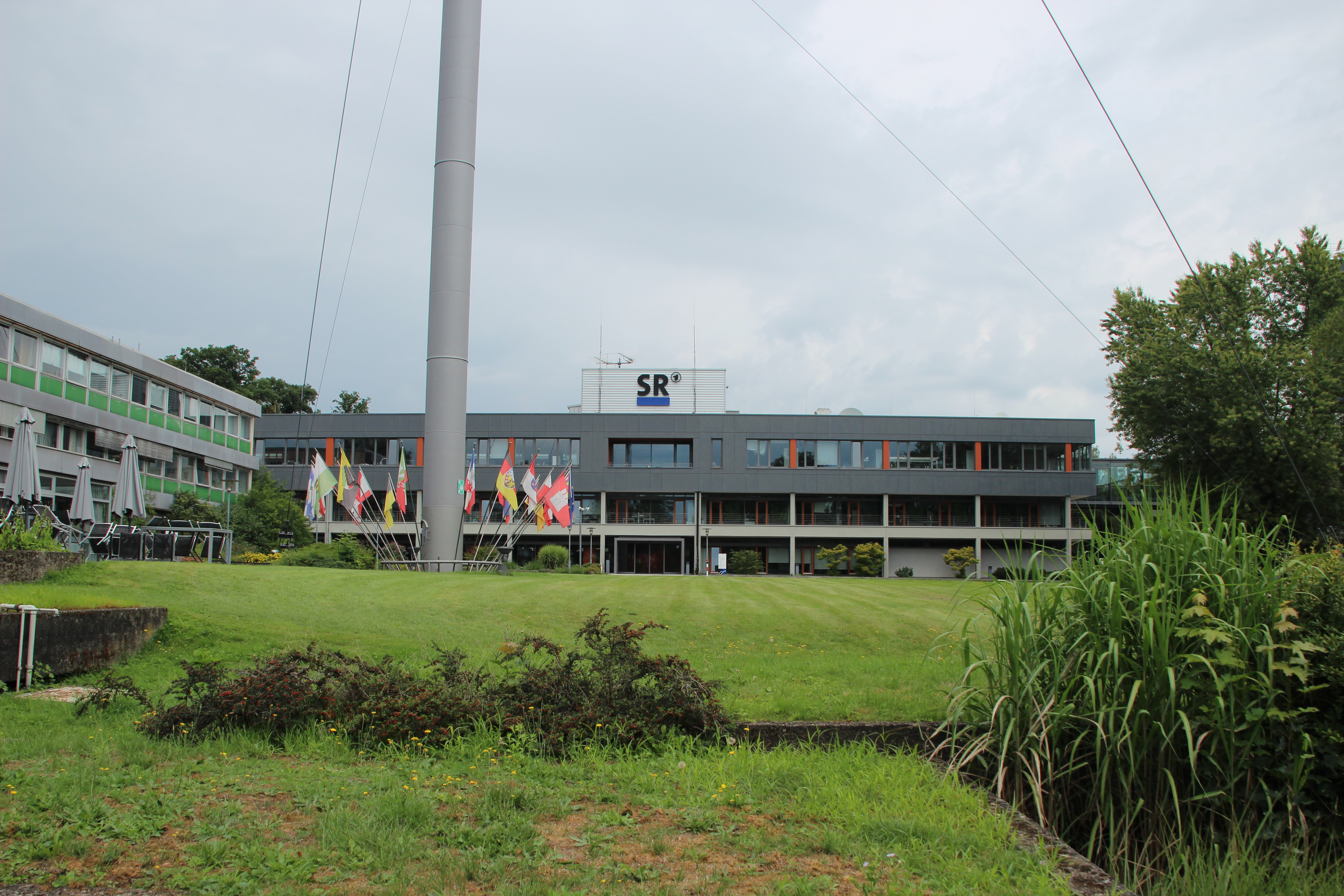
Funkhaus Halberg, Saarbrücken

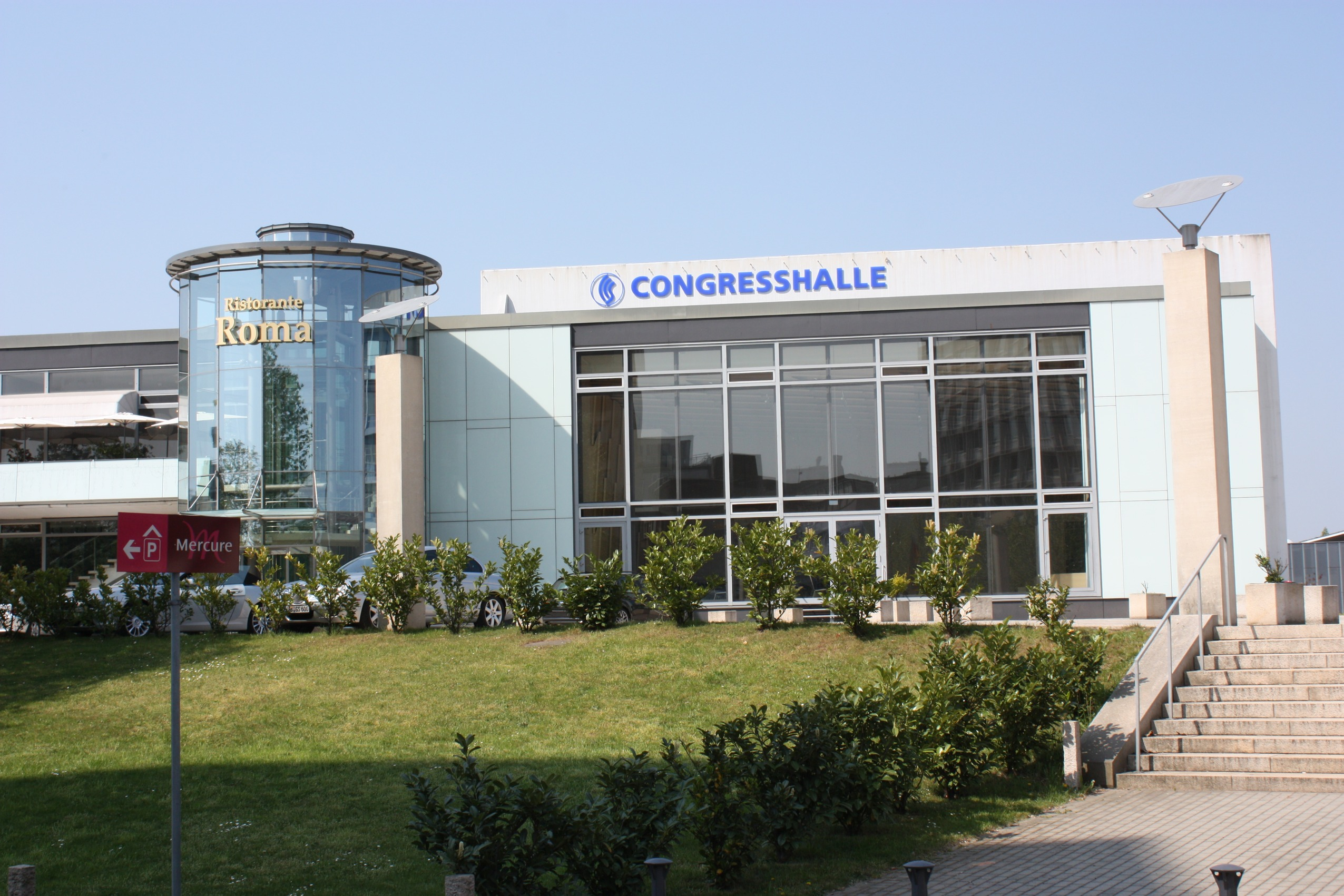
Congress Hall, Saarbrücken

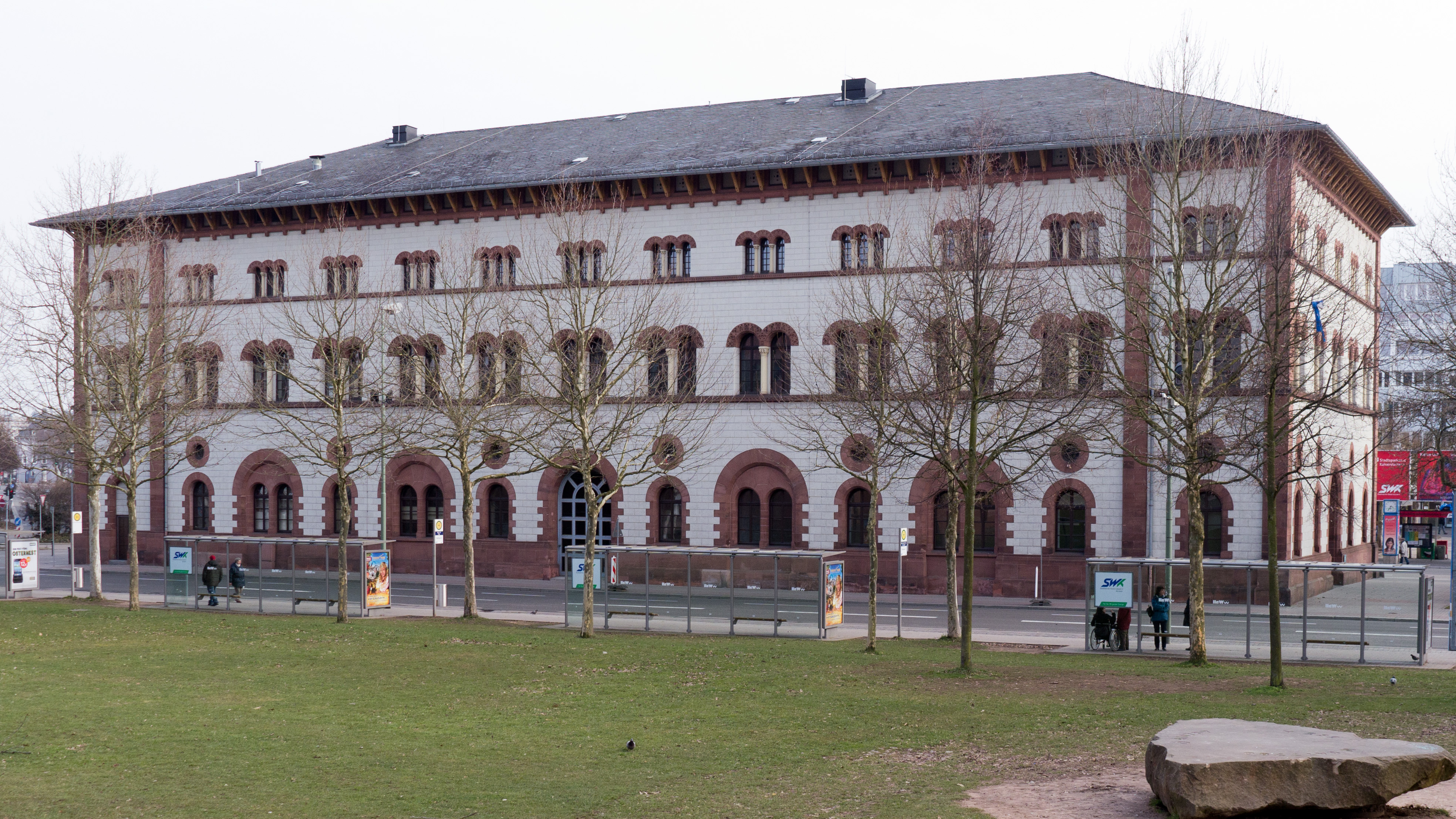
Fruchthalle, Kaiserslautern
