= De Doelen =

Concert venue and convention centre in the Netherlands

Coordinates: 51°55′18″N 4°28′23″E

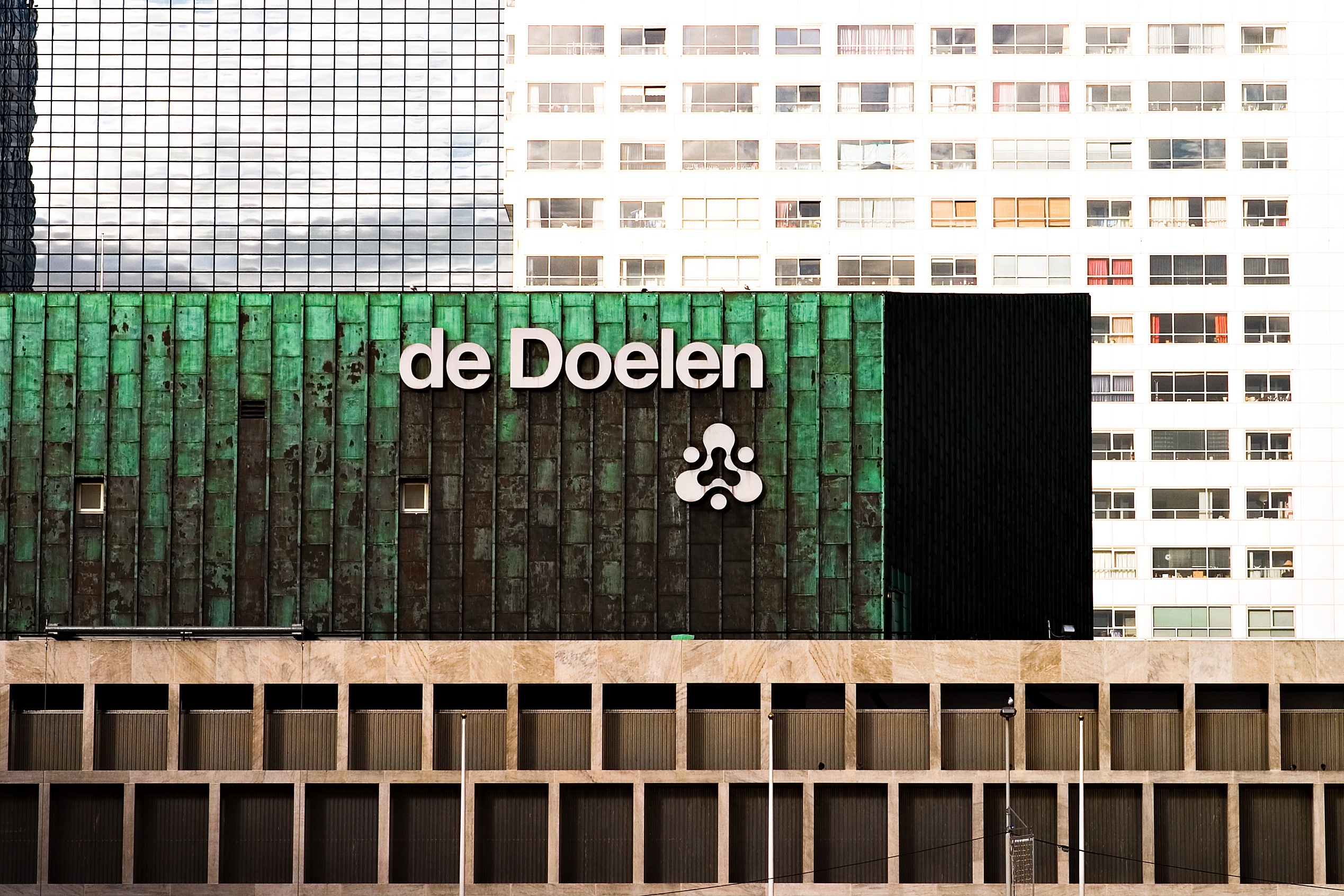
de Doelen

De Doelen is a concert venue and convention centre in Rotterdam, Netherlands. It was originally built in 1934 but then destroyed in 1940 during the German bombardment of Rotterdam in May 1940 at the outset of World War II. It was rebuilt in 1966, originally with one hall to which two more were added in the 1990s.

It has a variety of facilities, including the Grote Zaal (Grand Hall), a 2,200-seat concert hall, two smaller halls which each seat about 700 people, and convention rooms. In 2015 it was classified as a Rijksmonument.. The Grateful Dead played a concert in the Grote Zaal on May 11, 1972 as part of their Europe '72 tour.

Although mainly known as a venue for classical music, de Doelen is also a stage for jazz and world music, and is the central box office for the International Film Festival Rotterdam. It is also the home of the Rotterdam Philharmonic Orchestra.
