= Stavanger Symphony Orchestra =

Norwegian symphony orchestra

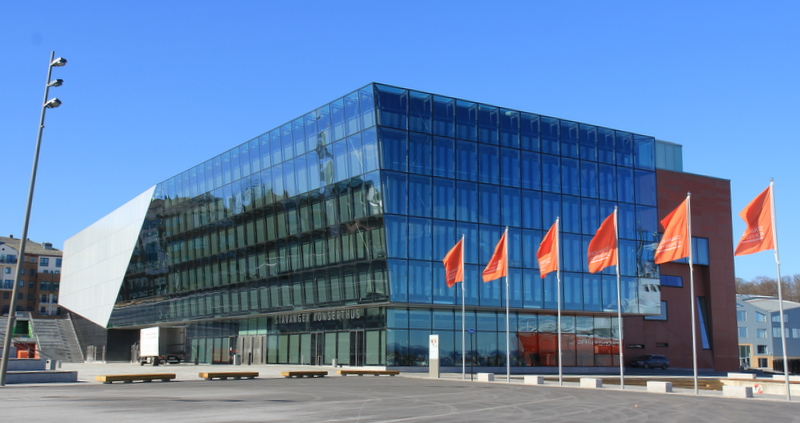
Stavanger Concert Hall

The Stavanger Symphony Orchestra (Norwegian: Stavanger Symfoniorkester, SSO) is a symphony orchestra based in Stavanger, Norway. The SSO principal venue is the Stavanger Concert Hall (Stavanger konserthus), performing in the Fartein Valen concert hall.

== History ==
The Norwegian Broadcasting Corporation founded the orchestra in 1938 as the Stavanger musikerforenings orkester, for radio broadcasts. The orchestra's first artistic leader was the violinist Gunnar Knudsen, from 1938 to 1945. In 1965, the orchestra's name was changed to the Symfoniorkestret i Stavanger, and again in 1982 to its present name.

Past artistic leaders of the orchestra have included Susanna Mälkki (2002–2005), and more recently the American conductor Steven Sloane (2007–2013). Christian Vásquez was chief conductor from 2013 to 2019. In addition to its chief conductor, the SSO has appointed conductors with a formal principal responsibility for early music programming, including Frans Brüggen (1990–1997), Philippe Herreweghe, and since 2006, Fabio Biondi.

In June 2019, the SSO announced the appointment of Andris Poga as its next chief conductor, effective with the 2021–2022 season. Tianyi Lu became the SSO's conductor-in-residence for the 2021-2022 season. In June 2023, the SSO announced an extension of Poga's contract as chief conductor through the 2025-2026 season.

The SSO has recorded commercially for such labels as BIS, including music of Harald Sæverud, Geirr Tveitt and Fartein Valen.

== Artistic leaders and chief conductors ==
- Gunnar Knudsen (1938–1945)
- Karsten Andersen (1945–1963)
- Bjørn Woll (1963–1989)
- Aleksandr Dmitriev (1990–1998)
- Ole Kristian Ruud (1999–2002)
- Susanna Mälkki (2002–2005)
- Steven Sloane (2007–2013)
- Christian Vásquez (2013–2019)
- Andris Poga (2021–present)

== Early music programme directors ==
- Frans Brüggen (1990–1997)
- Philippe Herreweghe
- Fabio Biondi (2006–2017)
