= Tarmo Peltokoski =

Finnish conductor and pianist (born 2000)

- Born: 20 April 2000 (age 26); Vaasa, Finland
- Education: Sibelius Academy
- Occupations: Conductor; pianist; composer; musical improviser
- Organizations: Latvian National Symphony Orchestra; Orchestre national du Capitole de Toulouse; Rotterdam Philharmonic Orchestra; Deutsche Kammerphilharmonie Bremen; Hong Kong Philharmonic Orchestra
- Parents: Raine Peltokoski (father); Maria Flor Villagracia Saulon (mother)
- Family: Raila Peltokoski (grandmother)
- Awards

Tarmo Peltokoski (born 20 April 2000) is a Finnish conductor, pianist, and composer.

== Early life and education ==
Born in Vaasa, Peltokoski is of Finnish ancestry on his father's side and Filipino ancestry on his mother's side. He began piano studies at age 8 at Kuula-opisto in his native city. At age 14, Peltokoski's father contacted Jorma Panula about accepting his son for conducting studies. At his annual master class in Vaasa, Panula met Peltokoski, and subsequently accepted him as a private conducting student for the next four years. He had studied in the Helsinki Conservatory of Music and the Eira High School for Adults but later dropped out in pursuit of his passion. In 2017, he competed in the International Maj Lind Piano Competition. He played his own étude Neoclassical Impression on the first round of the competition; however, he was eliminated before the semi-final.

Peltokoski continued his music studies at the Sibelius Academy, where his conducting instructors included Sakari Oramo, before leaving the institution without a degree. His other conducting mentors have included Hannu Lintu, Jukka-Pekka Saraste, and Esa-Pekka Salonen.

== Career ==
During the COVID-19 lockdown, the Deutsche Kammerphilharmonie Bremen invited Peltokoski for a guest-conducting engagement in late 2020, at the suggestion of Pekka Kuusisto and Iiro Rantala. Peltokoski first guest-conducted the orchestra in a public concert in June 2021. In January 2022, the orchestra appointed Peltokoski its principal guest conductor, the first conductor to be granted that title in the orchestra's history.

In January 2022, Peltokoski first guest-conducted the Latvian National Symphony Orchestra (LNSO). In May 2022, the LNSO announced the appointment of Peltokoski as its next music director and artistic director, effective with the 2022–2023 season.

In May 2022, Peltokoski first guest-conducted the Rotterdam Philharmonic Orchestra (RPhO). On the basis of this appearance, the RPhO announced the appointment of Peltokoski as its next principal guest conductor, effective with the 2023–2024 season, with an initial contract of 4 years.

In September 2022, Peltokoski first guest-conducted the Orchestre national du Capitole de Toulouse. He returned for an additional guest-conducting appearance in October 2022. In December 2022, the Orchestre national du Capitole de Toulouse announced the appointment of Peltokoski as its next music director, effective with the 2025–2026 season, with an initial contract of four seasons. He held the title of music director-designate for the 2024–2025 season.

In January 2023, Peltokoski made his guest-conducting debuts in North America with the San Diego Symphony and the Toronto Symphony Orchestra. In October 2023, Peltokoski signed a recording contract with Deutsche Grammophon (DG). His debut album for DG was released in May 2024, with the Deutsche Kammerphilharmonie Bremen, in recordings of Mozart symphonies.

Peltokoski first guest-conducted the Hong Kong Philharmonic Orchestra in June 2023. In July 2024, the orchestra announced the appointment of Peltokoski as its next music director, effective with the 2026–2027 season, with an initial contract of four years. He held the title of music director-designate for the 2025–2026 season.

In March 2024, Classic FM selected Peltokoski as one of their 30 'Rising Stars' of the year.

== Selected compositions ==
- Matka Maan Keskipisteeseen (Journey to the Center of the Earth) (for solo piano)
- Mysteeri (Mystery) (for solo piano)
- Neoklassinen Impressio (Neoclassical Impression) (Etude for solo piano)
- Loitsu (Spell) (improvisation for solo piano)
- Istutus Raudaskylässä (lit. Planting in Raudasjärvi)
- Nephesh (for string quartet)
- Improvisation on Mozart's "Haffner" Symphony
- Improvisation on Mozart's Symphony No. 40
- Improvisation on Mozart's "Linz" Symphony
- Trio (for violin, violoncello and piano)
- Nostalghia (for violin and piano)

== Discography ==
- Wolfgang Amadeus Mozart: Symphonies No. 35 ('Haffner'), No. 36 ('Linz'), No. 40 in G minor; with the Deutsche Kammerphilharmonie Bremen (2024, Deutsche Grammophon)
- Richard Wagner: The Ring: An Orchestral Adventure (Arr. Henk de Vlieger); with the Hong Kong Philharmonic Orchestra (2026, Deutsche Grammophon)

== Awards and recognitions ==
- 2018: Young Musician of the Year by the Pro Musica Foundation
- 2022: Rheingau Musik Festival Lotto Prize
- 2023: OPUS Klassik "Young Artist of the Year (Conducting)" ("Oskar Bohme: Trumpet Concerto & Pieces", with Matthias Höfs and the Deutsche Kammerphilharmonie Bremen)
- 2024: Classic FM "30 Rising Stars of 2024"
- 2025: Tatler Asia "Gen.T Leaders of Tomorrow (Hong Kong)"
- 2026: Forbes Asia "30 for 30 Asia 2026 - The Arts (Art & Style, Food & Drink)"
- 2026: OPUS Klassik Conductor of the Year [Nominee] ("Richard Wagner: The Ring: An Orchestral Adventure (Arr. Henk de Vlieger)", with the Hong Kong Philharmonic Orchestra)

Cultural offices
Preceded by Andris Poga	Music Director, Latvian National Symphony Orchestra; 2022–present	Succeeded by incumbent
Preceded by Tugan Sokhiev	Music Director, Orchestre national du Capitole de Toulouse; 2025–present	Succeeded by incumbent
Preceded by Jaap van Zweden	Music Director, Hong Kong Philharmonic Orchestra; 2026–present	Succeeded by incumbent
