= Eberhard Kloke =

German conductor and composer

Eberhard Kloke (born 24 November 1948) is a German conductor and composer.

== Early life and education ==
Born in Hamburg, Eberhard Kloke studied as a conductor at the Berlin University of the Arts and also for his degree in musicology and German studies at the Freie Universität Berlin.

== Early career ==
He began his career as a répétiteur and conductor in Mainz, Darmstadt, Düsseldorf and Lübeck before being appointed general music director in Ulm in 1980. He took on the same position in Freiburg/Breisgau in 1983.

== As a guest conductor ==
Since 1984 he has been taken on engagements as guest conductor at the Deutsche Oper Berlin, the Komische Oper Berlin, also with the Essen Philharmoniker, the Orchestra of the Beethovenhalle Bonn and many European radio orchestras (WDR Symphony Orchestra Cologne, NDR Symphony Orchestra Hamburg , North German Radiophilharmonie Hanover, SWR Symphony Orchestra Saarbrücken, Deutsches Symphonieorchester, RAI Rome, Radio Orchestra Ljubljana, the Slovak Philharmonic Bratislava), and also at the Vienna Festwochen, the Brucknerfest in Linz and the Salzburg Festival.

== As a music director in Bochum ==
From 1988 to 1994 he was the general music director of the Bochumer Symphoniker and in 1993 he took over as general director of the Nuremberg Opera and general music director of the Staatsphilharmonie Nuremberg. Kloke's artistic work centres above all on classical and modern music and realising new conceptual approaches to music; in Freiburg, Bochum and Nuremberg and in the Ruhr region he organised and conducted large-scale cycles of contemporary music programmes (Götterdämmerung_Maßstab und Gemessenes, Jakobsleiter, Ein deutscher Traum, Aufbrechen America, Prometheus, Jenseits des Klanges). In 1990 Kloke was awarded the German Critics' Prize, and in 1998 the German Association of Music Publishers honoured him with the distinction of having produced the Best Concert Programme of the Year.

== Freelance conductor and composer in Berlin ==
He has been resident in Berlin since 1998, concentrating on extra-institutional work as a freelance conductor, project initiator and composer. In 1999 he founded musikakzente 21 with the aim of developing cultural and music concepts for the twenty-first century, creating models of media networking and designing and realising implementation strategies. Since 2001, Kloke has been augmenting his range by initiating new audio, video and Internet projects in collaboration with the Viennese media artist Markus Wintersberger and the computer scientist Dominik Kloke. Kloke also composed the film music for Werner Schroeter's film Nuit de Chien, which was premiered in August 2008 at the Venice Film Festival.

In the years 2003–2018, his compositions and transcriptions were centred on: Wagner (Der Ring des Nibelungen, Parsifal and Tristan und Isolde) and transcriptions of Bach, Schubert, Schumann, Mahler, Schönberg, Bartók, Strauss, Weill and most notably Berg: Wozzeck, Wein, Altenberglieder and Lulu, the complete opera für soli and chamber orchestra and a new version of Act 3 for orchestra and chamber orchestra.

From 2014 to 2018 he produced orchestral versions of fourteen Beethoven piano sonatas and new versions of Mussorgsky's Boris Godunov and Khovanshchina, new versions of Janáček's Jenůfa and Katja, Tchaikovsky's Queen of Spades and Mazeppa, Debussy's Pelléas et Mélisande and Weill's Silbersee (The Silver Lake).

In 2018 Kloke transcribed Wagner's Tristan und Isolde in a version for soli, chorus (ad lib.) and two orchestras – chamber orchestra (inner action-prequel), orchestra 2 (outer action).

October 2010 through to March 2013: a series of performances of the new version of Act 3 of Alban Berg's opera Lulu was staged in Copenhagen, Oslo, Erfurt, Augsbutg, Dresden (Semperoper), Cardiff, Birmingham and Bozen. In 2017 the Theater an der Wien staged Kloke's Wozzeck version in a spectacular new production by Robert Carsen; the world premiere of his Salome version will be performed there in 2020.

Since 2002 Kloke has been published by Universal Edition (Vienna), since 2017 also by Schott, since 2018 by Sikorski and since Boosey & Hawkes.
