= Franz-Paul Decker =

German-born conductor

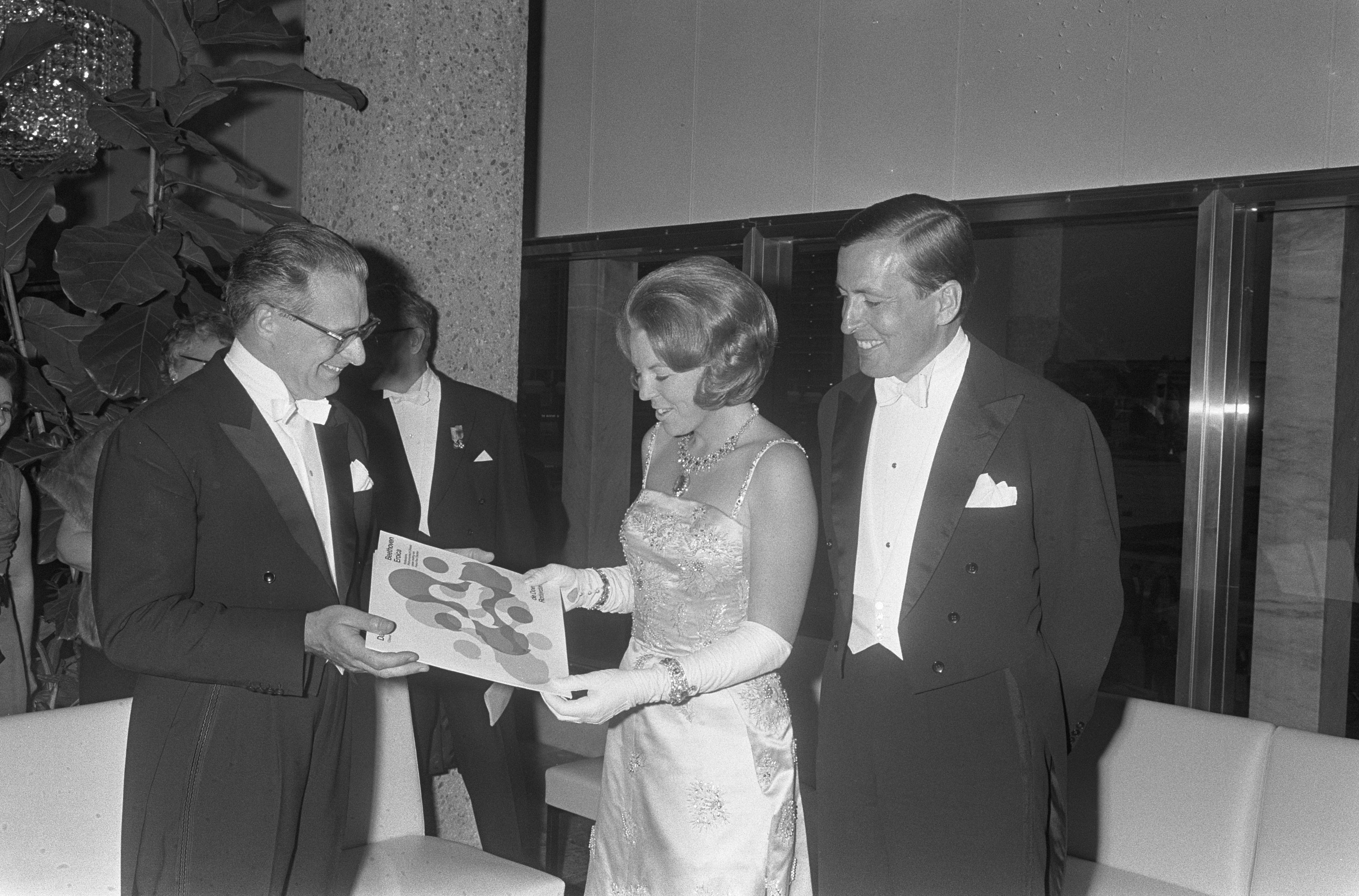
Franz-Paul Decker (left) with Princess Beatrix and Prince Claus of the Netherlands at the 1966 Holland Festival

Franz-Paul Decker (22 June 1923 – 19 May 2014) was a German-born conductor.

== Professional Life ==
Franz-Paul Decker was born in Cologne, Germany, where he studied at the Hochschule für Musik with Philip Jarnach and Eugen Papst. He made his conducting debut at the age of 22 at the Cologne Opera, and four years later was appointed to the Staatsoper Wiesbaden and subsequently to the positions of conductor of the Wiesbaden Symphony Orchestra and Generalmusikdirecktor in Bochum. In 1948, Decker was introduced to the composer Richard Strauss at a card game of whist. Strauss casually mentioned that he had just finished orchestrating four songs he had recently composed (the Four Last Songs).

Decker was highly regarded for his performances of Richard Wagner, Richard Strauss, Anton Bruckner, Max Reger and Gustav Mahler. He conducted the world premieres of dozens of orchestral works by Canadian composers, and conducted 85 different operas during his career.

Decker was Music Director of the Municipal Orchestra of Bochum (1956–1964), the Rotterdam Philharmonic Orchestra (1962–1967), the Montreal Symphony Orchestra (1967–1975), the Barcelona Symphony Orchestra (1985–1991), and the New Zealand Symphony Orchestra (1991–1996, as chief conductor). He served as Artistic Advisor to the Calgary Philharmonic Orchestra (1975–1977) and the Winnipeg Symphony Orchestra (1980–1982). He was Principal Guest Conductor of Ottawa's National Arts Centre Orchestra (1991–1999) and the Edmonton Symphony Orchestra (2003–2004).

Among the soloists he collaborated with were Arthur Rubinstein, Emil Gilels, Shura Cherkassky, Clara Haskil, Ida Haendel, Martha Argerich, Hélène Grimaud, Elisabeth Schwarzkopf, Jessye Norman, Dame Kiri Te Kanawa, Bernadette Greevy, and Jon Vickers. His television broadcast of a Christmas concert with Luciano Pavarotti and orchestra, filmed at Notre-Dame Basilica in Montreal in 1978 was broadcast annually around the world.

In 1975, he was awarded an honorary doctorate from Concordia University. He died in Montreal, Canada.

== Personal life ==
Franz-Paul Decker was born on June 22 1923, in Cologne, Germany. He moved to Montreal, Canada in the late 1960s, where he met and married Christa Terka. Together, they had two daughters: Arabella Decker, born in 1970, and Ariadne Decker, born in 1974. He went on to have five granddaughters: Petra, Isabella, Johanna, Mathilda, and Klara. Decker passed away on May 19 2014, a month shy of his 91st birthday.

Cultural offices
Preceded by Eduard Flipse	Music Directors, Rotterdam Philharmonic Orchestra; 1962–1967	Succeeded by Jean Fournet
Preceded by Antoni Ros-Marbà	Music Director and Principal Conductor, Orquestra Ciutat de Barcelona; 1986–1991	Succeeded by Antonio García Navarro
