= Orchestre national du Capitole de Toulouse =

French orchestra based in Toulouse, France

Orchestre National du Capitole de Toulouse
- Orchestra
- Former name: Orchestre du Capitole de Toulouse
- Location: Toulouse, France
- Concert hall: Halle aux grains de Toulouse; Théâtre du Capitole

The Orchestre National du Capitole de Toulouse is a French orchestra based in Toulouse. It acts as both a symphony orchestra whose main residence is Toulouse's Halle aux Grains, and the permanent orchestra of the Théâtre du Capitole in Toulouse.

== History ==
Initially named Orchestre du Capitole de Toulouse, the orchestra began as the opera orchestra of Théâtre du Capitole. Notable past music directors of the orchestra have included André Cluytens (beginning in 1932) and Georges Prêtre (1951–1955), but the Orchestre du Capitole rose to international prominence during Michel Plasson's tenure as music director, from 1968 to 2003.

Until Plasson's era, the orchestra was a purely operatic orchestra, rarely playing symphonies and almost never touring. Within twelve years, Plasson's insistence of higher artistic standards and goals had improved the orchestra's reputation. He began a period of critically acclaimed recordings and tours, and in 1980 the orchestra was bestowed the title of a French 'National' orchestra. Since 1974, the Halle aux Grains became the orchestra's main concert hall. It was originally a market and was later converted to a boxing arena, before becoming the orchestra's principle symphonic residence.

Plasson's personality, his insistence on playing and recording French repertoire (especially rarely played pieces), and his record contract with EMI, combined to make the orchestra the "reference" French orchestra, the most visible and most visibly French, with approximately one hundred records released. He also created a fundraising group called 'Aida', which has many large business donors, most notably Airbus, as well as banks. 'Aida' contributes to the orchestra's international touring calendar, and recordings. It was early in Plasson's tenure that the orchestra began to tour internationally, and it continues to tour today.

On May 9, 2003, Plasson announced his decision not to renew his contract after August 31, 2003. He complained that planned works in the Halle aux Grains would impair the 2003-2004 concert season. Unofficially, his departure was caused by the city's refusal to increase the orchestra's payroll. In 2004, Plasson was made "honorary conductor" of the orchestra.

In 2005, the city named Tugan Sokhiev principal guest conductor and musical adviser of the orchestra. Sokhiev became the orchestra's music director and principal conductor in September 2008. Artistically, Sokhiev moved the orchestra away from the French sound and traditions cultivated by Plasson. In 2011 the French national paper Le Figaro reviewed the top 25 orchestras in France. The Orchestre National du Capitole de Toulouse was listed among the three best orchestras in France, one of the so-called 'Trio de l'excellence'.

In 2015, Sokhiev signed a new contract with the orchestra through 2019. In March 2022, Sokhiev resigned as the orchestra's music director, citing pressure to make a public statement regarding the 2022 Russian invasion of Ukraine.

Tarmo Peltokoski first guest-conducted the orchestra in September 2022, and returned for an additional guest-conducting appearance in October 2022. In December 2022, the orchestra announced the appointment of Peltokoski as its next music director, effective with the 2025-2026 season, with an initial contract of four seasons. Peltokoski is to hold the title of music director-designate for the 2024-2025 season.

== Music directors (partial list) ==
- Georges Prêtre (1951–1955)
- Michel Plasson (1968–2003)
- Tugan Sokhiev (2008–2022)
- Tarmo Peltokoski (2025–present)
