= Elīna Garanča =

Latvian mezzo-soprano

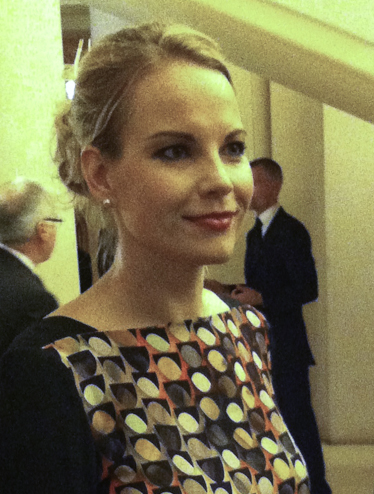
- Garanča in 2012
- Born: 16 September 1976 (age 50); Riga, Latvian SSR, Soviet Union
- Occupation: Opera singer
- Years active: 1998–present
- Spouse: Karel Mark Chichon
- Children: 2
- Mother: Anita Garanča
- Honours: Order of the Three Stars (2016); Echo Klassik (2007, 2009, 2015)
- Website: elinagaranca.com

Elīna Garanča (born 16 September 1976) is a Latvian mezzo-soprano. She began to study singing in her hometown of Riga in 1996 and continued her studies in Vienna and in the United States. By 1999 she had won first place in the Mirjam Helin Singing Competition in Helsinki and had begun a career in Europe. Worldwide engagements followed her 2003 Salzburg Festival appearances.

== Early life and education ==
Elīna Garanča was born in the Latvian city of Riga into a musical family: her father was a choral director, and her mother Anita was a lieder singer, a professor at the Latvian Academy of Music, an associate professor at the Latvian Academy of Culture, a vocal music teacher at the Latvian National Opera, and also a private voice tutor.

== Career in opera ==
She entered the Latvian Academy of Music in 1996 to study singing with Sergej Martinov. She continued her studies in Vienna with Irina Gavrilovich and in the United States with Virginia Zeani. Garanča began her professional career at the Meiningen Court Theatre, Meiningen, Germany in 1998, and later worked at the Frankfurt Opera. In 1999, she won the Mirjam Helin Singing Competition in Helsinki, Finland.

Garanča's international breakthrough came in 2003 at the Salzburg Festival when she sang Annio in a production of Mozart's La clemenza di Tito, conducted by Nikolaus Harnoncourt. Major engagements followed quickly, such as Charlotte in Werther, Dorabella in Così fan tutte at the Vienna State Opera (2004) and Dorabella in a Paris production directed by Patrice Chéreau (2005). In 2006, she returned to La clemenza di Tito, this time singing the part of Sesto. On 12 January 2008 Garanča made her company and house debut at the Metropolitan Opera in New York, in the role of Rosina in Rossini's Il barbiere di Siviglia. Of her debut, Bernard Holland wrote in The New York Times: "Ms. Garanca is the real thing ... Modern singing techniques adapt with difficulty to Rossini's early-19th-century emphasis on speed, lightness and athletic articulation, and Ms. Garanca was the only one onstage sounding completely comfortable. The lyric passages sang out; the episodes of racecourse delivery were fully in hand". Garanča sang the leading role of Georges Bizet's Carmen in the 2010 and 2015 productions of the Metropolitan Opera. In the opening concert of the 2011 Rheingau Musik Festival in the Eberbach Abbey she performed Alban Berg's Sieben frühe Lieder with the hr-Sinfonieorchester, conducted by Paavo Järvi.

In May 2018 Garanča made her stage role debut as Dalila in Camille Saint-Saëns' Samson et Dalila at the Vienna State Opera conducted by Marco Armiliato. In 2018, she appeared in the Metropolitan Opera's performance of that opera.

== Personal life ==
Garanča is married to the conductor Karel Mark Chichon, and they have two daughters. She is fluent in Latvian, French, German, Spanish, Russian, Italian, and English.

== Awards and honours ==
- 1999: First Place: Mirjam Helin International Singing Competition (Finland)
- 2000: Latvian Great Music Award
- 2001: Finalist: Cardiff BBC Singer of the World Competition (UK)
- 2005: Nominated: Grammy Award for the recording of Bajazet
- 2006: MIDEM Classical Award: "Best Opera", recording of Vivaldi's Bajazet with Fabio Biondi, conductor; Patrizia Ciofi, David Daniels, Ildebrando D'Arcangelo, Vivica Genaux and Marijana Mijanovic.
- 2006: European Culture Prize in Music (Soloist Category) awarded by the Pro Europa / European Foundation for Culture (Switzerland/Germany)
- 2007: Echo Klassik Award: "Singer of the Year" for the solo CD "Aria Cantilena"
- 2007: Latvian Order of the Three Stars, 4th Class
- 2009: Echo Klassik Award: "Singer of the Year"
- 2010: Musical America Award: "Vocalist of the Year"
- 2010: MIDEM Classical Award: "Singer of the Year"
- 2010: Latvian Great Music Award
- 2013: Austrian Kammersängerin
- 2013: Echo Klassik Award: "Best Solo Recording of the Year", (duets/opera/opera arias for Romantique, works by Berlioz, Donizetti, Gounod, Lalo, Saint-Saëns, Tchaikovsky and Vaccai). Filarmonica del Teatro Comunale di Bologna, cond. Yves Abel
- 2015: Echo Klassik Award: "Solo recording of the year"
- 2016: Order of the Three Stars, 3rd Class
- 2018: Rigan of the Year (Gada rīdzinieks)
- 2019: Latvian Excellence Award in Culture

== Repertoire ==
Garanča's repertoire includes:

Year (debut)	Composer	Opera	Role(s)	Location
	Wolfgang Amadeus Mozart	La clemenza di Tito	Annio	
	Pietro Mascagni	Cavalleria rusticana	Lola	
	Pietro Mascagni	Cavalleria rusticana	Santuzza	
	Wolfgang Amadeus Mozart	Le nozze di Figaro	Cherubino	
	Richard Strauss	Der Rosenkavalier	Octavian	
	Jules Massenet	Werther	Charlotte	
	Wolfgang Amadeus Mozart	Così fan tutte	Dorabella	
	Wolfgang Amadeus Mozart	La clemenza di Tito	Sesto	
	Gioachino Rossini	The Barber of Seville	Rosina	
	Gioachino Rossini	La Cenerentola	Angelina	
2010	Georges Bizet	Carmen	Carmen	Metropolitan Opera
	Vincenzo Bellini	I Capuleti e i Montecchi	Romeo	
2011	Gaetano Donizetti	Anna Bolena	Giovanna Seymour	Wiener Staatsoper
2016	Gaetano Donizetti	Roberto Devereux	Sara	Metropolitan Opera
	Gaetano Donizetti	La favorite	Léonor de Guzman	
	Hector Berlioz	Les Troyens	Didon	
	Wolfgang Amadeus Mozart	Don Giovanni	Donna Elvira	
	Jules Massenet	La Navarraise	Anita	
	Johann Strauss	Die Fledermaus	Orlofsky	
	Jacques Offenbach	Contes d'Hoffmann	Nicklausse	
	Vincenzo Bellini	Norma	Adalgisa	
	Giuseppe Verdi	Don Carlos	Eboli	
	Giuseppe Verdi	Falstaff	Meg Page	
	Hector Berlioz	La damnation de Faust	Marguerite	
2018	Camille Saint-Saëns	Samson et Dalila	Dalila	Vienna State Opera
2021	Richard Wagner	Parsifal	Kundry	Vienna State Opera

== Recordings ==
Her recordings include the Grammy Award winning Bajazet conducted by Fabio Biondi, in which she sang the role of Andronicus. In 2005, Garanča signed an exclusive contract with Deutsche Grammophon.

Other audio recordings include:

- I Capuleti e i Montecchi by Vincenzo Bellini
- Norma by Vincenzo Bellini
- Il barbiere di Siviglia by Gioachino Rossini
- Arie Favorite, Ondine
- Habanera, Deutsche Grammophon 2010 2894778776
- Aria Cantilena, Deutsche Grammophon
- Mozart: Opera and Concert Arias, EMI Classics
- Bel Canto, Deutsche Grammophon
- Romantique, Deutsche Grammophon
- The Opera Gala: Live from Baden-Baden ft. Anna Netrebko, Ramón Vargas, and Ludovic Tézier
- Elina: The Best of Elina Garanča, Deutsche Grammophon 2013 2894792241
- Revive: Elina Garanca and Orquestra de la Comunitat Valenciana and Roberto Abbado, Deutsche Grammophon 2016 2894795937
- Elina Garanca Meditation Karel Mark Chichon conducting Deutsche Radio Philharmonic and Latvian Radio Choir Deutsche Grammophon 2014 2894792071
- Elina Garanca Mozart Vivaldi Parliphone Records LTD A Warner Music Group Company Erato 2005 190295905996
- Elina Garanca Mozart Opera & Concert Arias Camerata Saltzburg Louis Langree Virgin Classics
- Elgar Barenboim Sea Pictures Elina Garanca Falstaff Staatskapelle Berlin Decca Classics 2020 2894850968
- Lieder Elīna Garanča, Malcolm Martineau, Robert Schumann Frauenliebe und Leben op. 42, Johannes Brahms, Heimweh II: “O wüsst’ ich doch den Weg zurück” op. 63 no. 8, Liebe und Frühling II: “Ich muss hinaus” op. 3 no. 3, Liebestreu op. 3 no. 1 · Mädchenlied op. 107 no. 5, O kühler Wald op. 72 no. 3 · Verzagen op. 72 no. 4, O liebliche Wangen op. 47 no. 4 · Geheimnis op. 71 no. 3, Wir wandelten op. 96 no. 2 · Alte Liebe op. 72 no. 1, Die Mainacht op. 43 no. 2 · Von ewiger Liebe op. 43 no. 1, November 6, 2020 Deutsche Grammophon 2020

DVD recordings include:

- Anna Bolena by Donizetti. Recording from Vienna State Opera
- La Cenerentola by Gioachino Rossini
- Carmen by Georges Bizet

== Bibliography ==
- Wirklich wichtig sind die Schuhe ("The shoes are really important"), Ecowin Verlag GmbH 2013, ISBN 978-3711000453; Garanča's first autobiography.
- Zwischen den Welten: Mein Weg auf die großen Opernbühnen (Between the Worlds: My way to the great opera stages), Ecowin Verlag GmbH 2019, ISBN 978-3711002334; Garanča's second autobiography.
