= Anita Garanča =

Latvian singer and vocal teacher

Anita Garanča (10 February 1949 – 23 July 2015) was a Latvian lieder singer and vocal teacher. She was the mother of mezzo-soprano Elīna Garanča.

In 1973 Garanča graduated from the Jāzeps Vītols Latvian Academy of Music, in 1983 with the Vocal Department. Pedagogue Daugavpils Pedagogical Institute. From 1976 to 1982 she was the soloist of the chamber choir Ave Sol, then until 1989, at the Latvian Philharmonic. From 1977 to 2001, she directed the young choir "Zvani". Since 1984 she had been a teacher at the Latvian Academy of Music's Vocal Department, and since 1999 as a professor.

In 1995 she received the Spēlmaņu nakts Award.
