= Adam's Lament =

Adam's Lament is an old Russian Orthodox lament, originally sung during Lent. Manuscripts of the lament date from the fifteenth to seventeenth centuries. The lament tells Adam's regret over the loss of paradise. A modern version of Adam's Lament by Silouan of Athos is the text for Adam's Lament (Pärt), a 2009 choral composition in Russian language by Estonian composer Arvo Pärt.
