= Gibraltar Philharmonic Society =

The Gibraltar Philharmonic Society is the national philharmonic society of the British Overseas Territory of Gibraltar. They are based at Grand Casemates Square. The society arranges concerts in Gibraltar and as of 2013 has attracted notables such as the English Chamber Orchestra and soloists from the Vienna State Opera, Metropolitan Opera of New York City, the Teatro alla Scala of Milan, the Royal Opera House of Covent Garden, London, and the Berlin State Opera. In October 2012 the Riga New String Quartet were invited by the society to perform in Gibraltar.
