= Grand Music Award =

Latvian music award

Great Music Award (Latvian: Lielā mūzikas balva), is the highest prize awarded by the Latvian state in the field of music. Award winners receive a monetary prize, and a silver statuette, created by Armands Jēkabsons.
