= Alexandre Tansman =

Polish composer (1897–1986)

Alexander Tansman (Polish: Aleksander Tansman, French: Alexandre Tansman; 12 June 1897 – 15 November 1986) was a Polish and French composer, pianist and conductor. One of the earliest representatives of neoclassicism, associated with École de Paris, Tansman was a globally recognized and celebrated composer.

== Early life and heritage ==
Tansman was born and raised in Łódź, Congress Poland. His parents were of Lithuanian Jewish ancestry. His father Moshe Tantzman (1868–1908) died when Alexander was 10 and his mother Hannah (née Gourvitch, 1872–1935) reared him and his older sister Teresa alone.

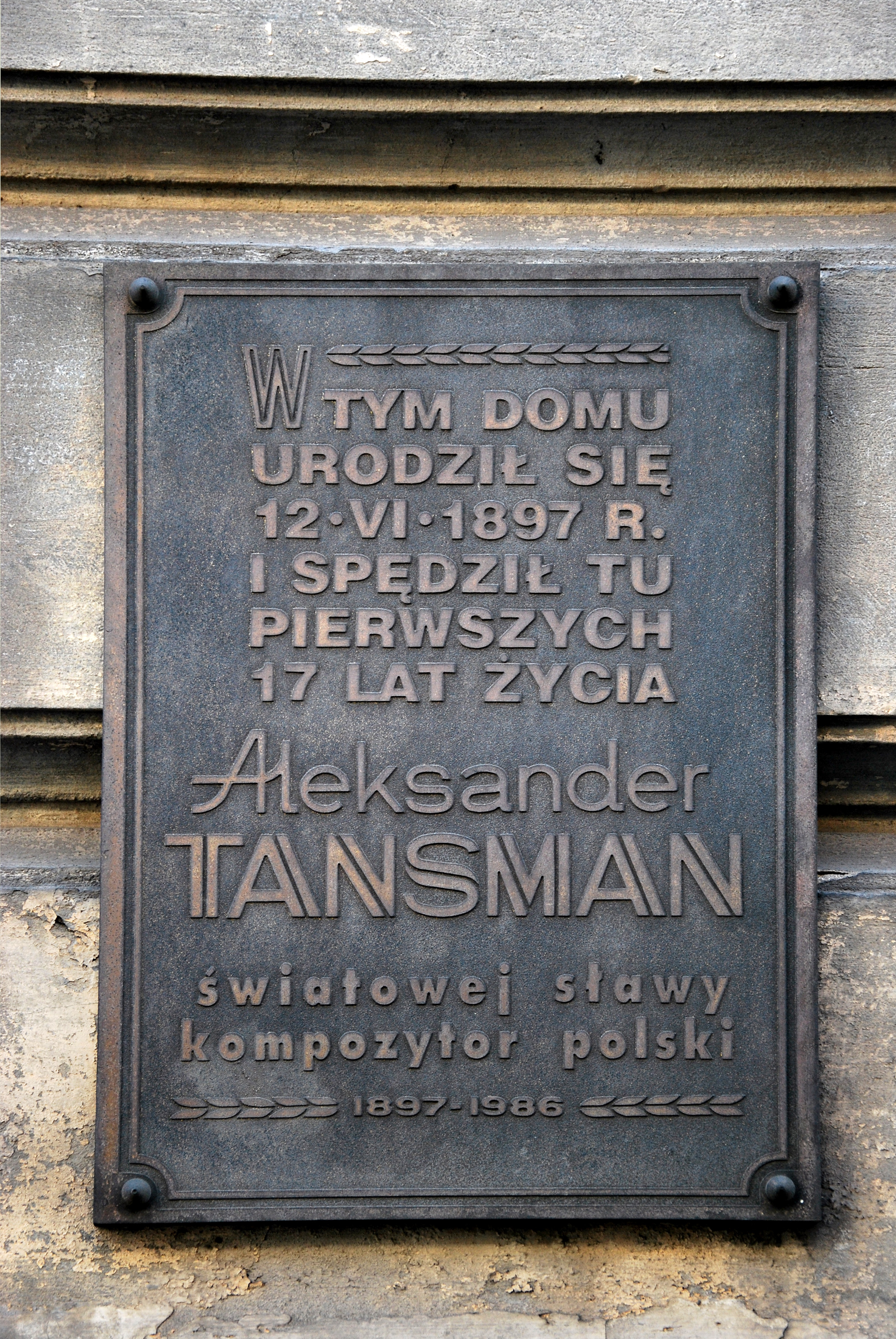
Commemorative plaque in Łódź with the inscription: "Aleksander Tansman, a world-famous Polish composer, was born in this house on June 12, 1897, and spent the first 17 years of his life here"

Tansman later wrote:

[M]y father's family came from Pinsk and I knew of a famous rabbi related to him. My father died very young, and there were certainly two, or more branches of the family, as ours was quite wealthy: we had in Lodz several domestics, two governesses (French and German) living with us etc. My father had a sister who settled in Israel and married there. I met her family on my [concert] tours in Israel. ... My family was, as far as religion is concerned, quite liberal, not practicing. My mother was the daughter of Prof. Leon Gourvitch, quite a famous man.

Tansman explained his later Francophile tendencies:

I had always been attracted to French culture. I had a governess who instilled in us a love of France. My family was very Francophile; we often spoke French at home and we had a vast French library. Ordinarily, Eastern European musicians went to Germany to pursue their careers. As for me, I chose Paris and have never regretted it. Nevertheless, I have returned to Poland a number of times.

== Career ==
Among his first music teachers were Wojciech Gawronski (a student of Zygmunt Noskowski, Moritz Moszkowski and Theodor Leschetizky) and Naum Podkaminer (a student of Hermann Graedener and Richard Hofmann).

Although he began his musical studies at the Lodz Conservatory, his study was in law at the University of Warsaw. On January 8, 1919, Tansman won the first composers' competition held in independent Poland, and gave a series of concerts at the Warsaw Philharmonic in the following months. In the fall of 1919, encouraged by his mentors Ignacy Jan Paderewski, Henryk Melcer-Szczawinski and Zdzisław Birnbaum, Tansman decided to continue his musical career in Paris. The first artists he was fortunate to meet shortly after his arrival were Moritz Moszkowski and Sarah Bernhardt. In Paris, his musical ideas were appreciated, influenced and favoured by composers Maurice Ravel, Albert Roussel, Jacques Ibert, Igor Stravinsky, musicologists and critics Émile Vuillermoz, Boris de Schloezer, Alexis Roland-Manuel, Arthur Hoérée, conductors André Caplet, Gaston Poulet, Vladimir Golschmann. Though Arthur Honegger and Darius Milhaud tried to persuade him to join Les Six, he declined, stating a need for creative independence. Nevertheless, he was one of the earliest and leading representatives of neoclassicism, along with Stravinsky, Les Six, Sergei Prokofiev, Paul Hindemith, Alfredo Casella. He was also one of the most respected members of the international music group École de Paris, along with Bohuslav Martinů, Tibor Harsányi, Alexander Tcherepnin, Marcel Mihalovici, Conrad Beck.

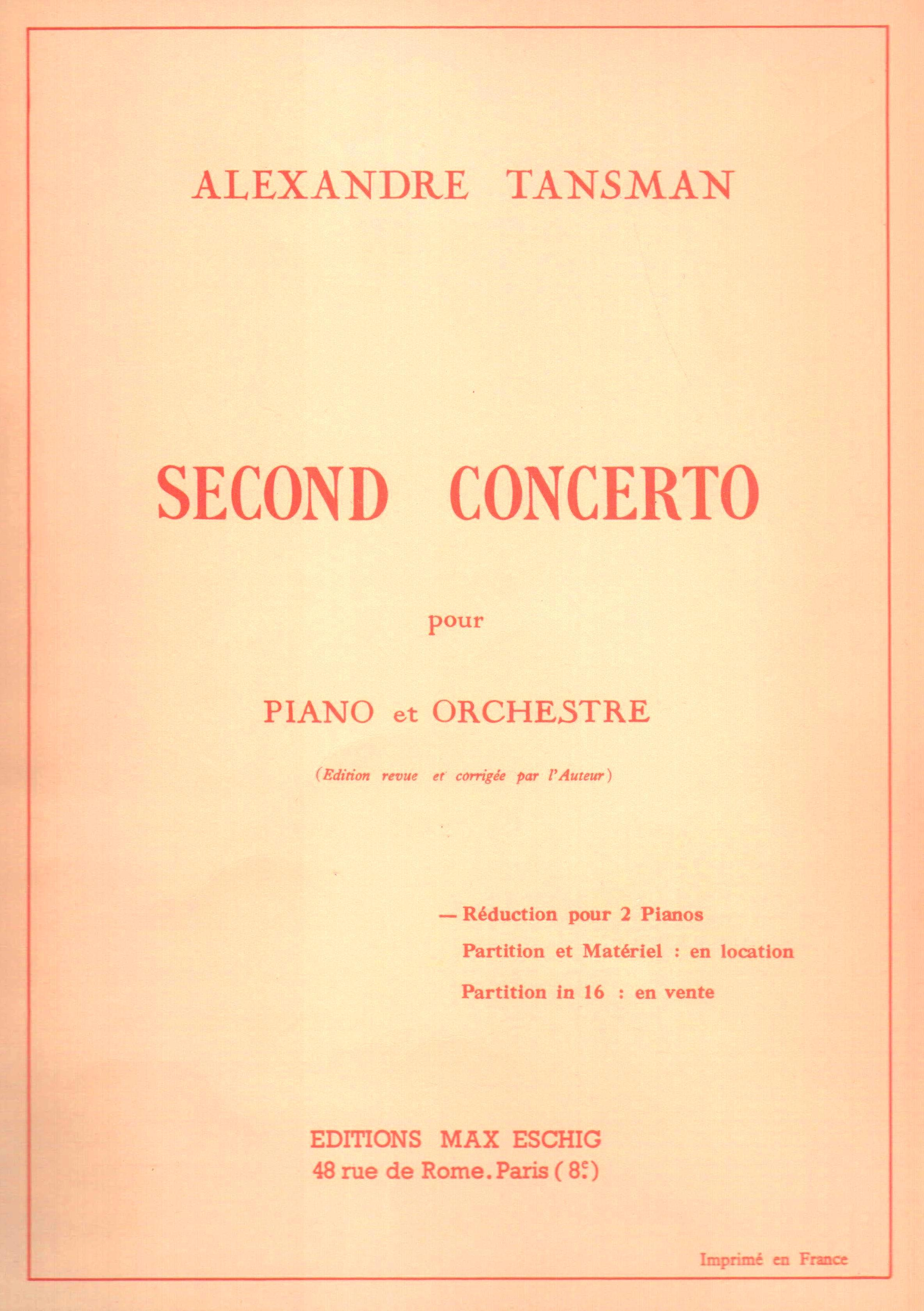
Cover of the score of Tansman's Second Concerto (1927) dedicated to Charlie Chaplin, Éditions Max Eschig

From the 1920s Tansman's rise to fame was meteoric, with works conducted and championed by such world-famous baton masters as Arturo Toscanini, Tullio Serafin, Willem Mengelberg, Walter Damrosch, Sir Henry Wood, Serge Koussevitzky, Pierre Monteux, Otto Klemperer, Rhené-Baton, Désiré-Émile Inghelbrecht, Walther Straram, Hermann Abendroth, Leopold Stokowski, Erich Kleiber, Sir Adrian Boult, Dimitri Mitropoulos, Frederick Stock, Eugene Ormandy. Tansman follows Paderewski as the second Polish composer whose theatre piece – ballet Sextuor – was staged by the Metropolitan Opera (1927).

As early as the first half of the 1920s, Belgian music critic and composer Georges Systermans wrote that Tansman's musical personality "combines poetic genius with Latin culture". Tansman's works started to be frequently performed in programs with pieces by Maurice Ravel, Igor Stravinsky and Gian Francesco Malipiero on the one hand, and Wolfgang Amadeus Mozart, Carl Maria von Weber and Nikolai Rimsky-Korsakov on the other. Each time he visited Germany, he was invited to Arnold Schönberg's home, who at that time lectured in Berlin. In 1927 Nicolas Slonimsky called Tansman a "musical plenipotentiary of Poland in the Western World".

From the mid-1920s, and into the decades that followed, Tansman's works were performed in some of the best concert halls in the world, such as Salle Gaveau, Théâtre Royal de la Monnaie, Carnegie Hall, Opéra National de Paris, New York Philharmonic, Théâtre des Champs-Élysées, Salle Pleyel, Boston Symphony Hall, Théâtre Mogador, Opéra National de Lyon, Château Royal de Laeken, Théâtre de la Ville, Palais-Royal, Berlin State Opera, Royal Albert Hall, Metropolitan Opera, Severance Hall, Centre for Fine Arts, Brussels, Concertgebouw, Amsterdam, DAR Constitution Hall, Cologne Opera, Tokyo Hibiya Public Hall, Berlin Philharmonic, Oslo National Theatre, Wigmore Hall, La Fenice, Academy of Music (Philadelphia), De Doelen, Teatro Nacional de São Carlos, Opéra de Nice, Orchestra Hall, Théâtre du Vieux-Colombier, Hollywood Bowl, Powell Hall, Mann Auditorium, Johannesburg City Hall, Teatro Colón, Grand Auditorium, Royce Hall.

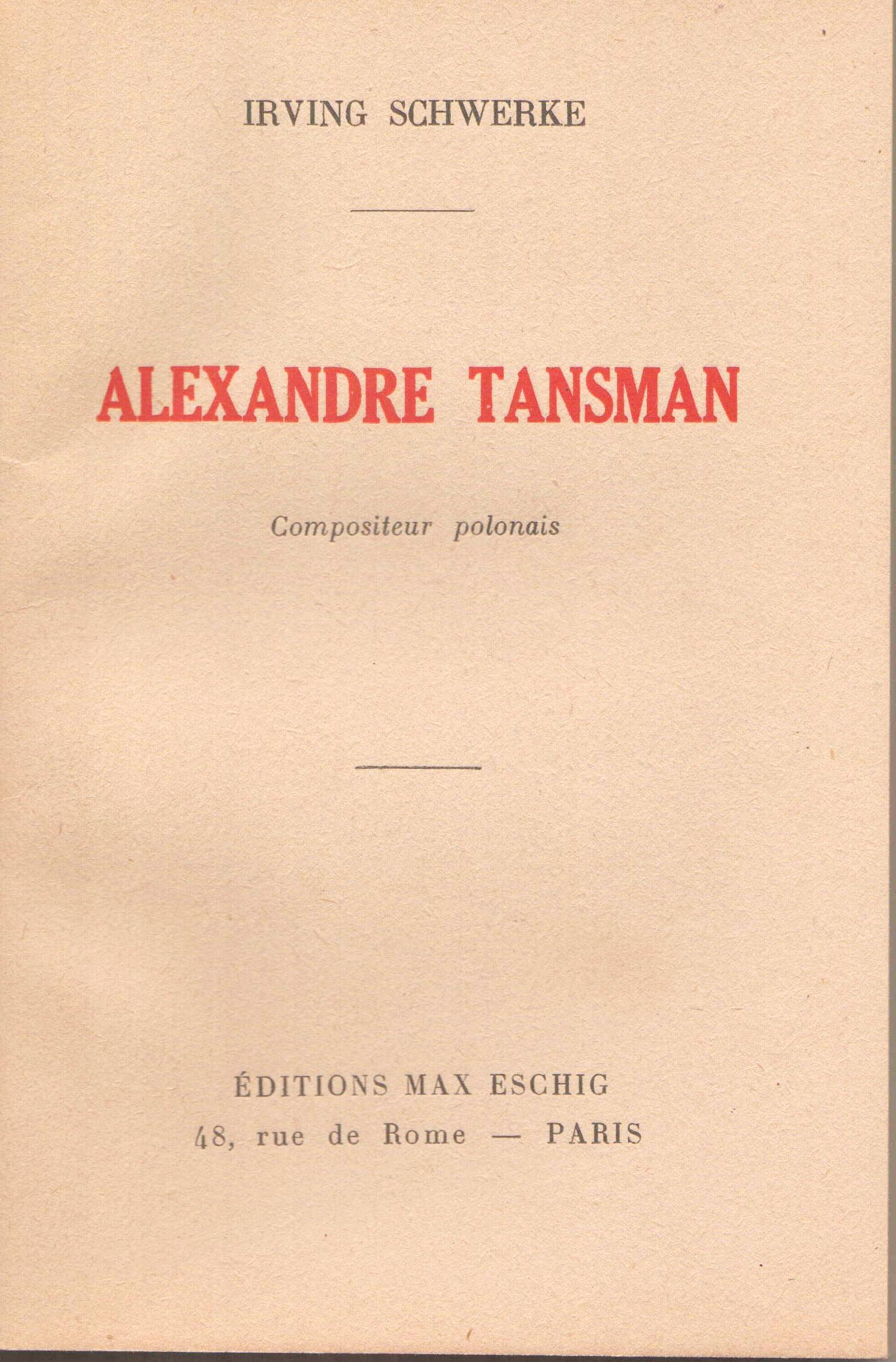
Cover Irving Schwerke's book, Paris 1931, Éditions Max Eschig

In 1931, a book authored by Irving Schwerke and titled Alexandre Tansman. Compositeur polonais (Alexander Tansman. The Polish Composer) was published in Paris. The book was devoted to the work of Tansman until 1930 and its reception, to his individual style and the aesthetics of his oeuvre. It also contained Tansman's short biography and the first catalogue of his works and their European and American premieres. Tansman's music – according to Schwerke – "is undoubtedly the most complete homage that any Polish composer of his generation has paid to his country. It occupies a prominent place among the most important artistic manifestations of the present day".

In 1932–1933, Tansman made an unprecedented artistic tour around the world – starting with the United States, through Japan, Hong Kong, Indonesia, Singapore, Ceylon, India and Egypt, to Italy. He was honored by Mahatma Gandhi and Emperor Hirohito of Japan. In Tokyo, Tansman was granted honorary membership of the Imperial Academy of Music and awarded Golden Ji Ji Shimpo Medal in recognition of his notable contribution to the world of arts.

As Marcel Mihalovici noted, Tansman was one of the most prominent contemporary representatives of the centuries-old tradition of École de Paris: "This included musicians at Notre-Dame Cathedral during the Renaissance, and later Lully, Mozart, and Wagner. Not to mention Chopin, Falla, Enescu, Honegger, Stravinsky, Prokofiev, Copland, and certainly our old colleague Alexander Tansman".

In June 1938, four years after Stravinsky and in the same year as Bruno Walter, Tansman was granted French citizenship by the last president of the Third Republic Albert Lebrun. Tansman fled Europe as his Jewish background put him in danger with Hitler's rise to power. He moved to Los Angeles, thanks to the efforts of his friend Charlie Chaplin in founding a committee visa. In 1941 he could join there the circle of famous emigrated artists and intellectuals that included Igor Stravinsky, Thomas Mann, Arnold Schoenberg, Alma Mahler, Franz Werfel, Emil Ludwig, Aldous Huxley, Lion Feuchtwanger, Man Ray, Eugène Berman, Jean Renoir. During this time, he also met and befriended Golo Mann as well as Sholem Asch.

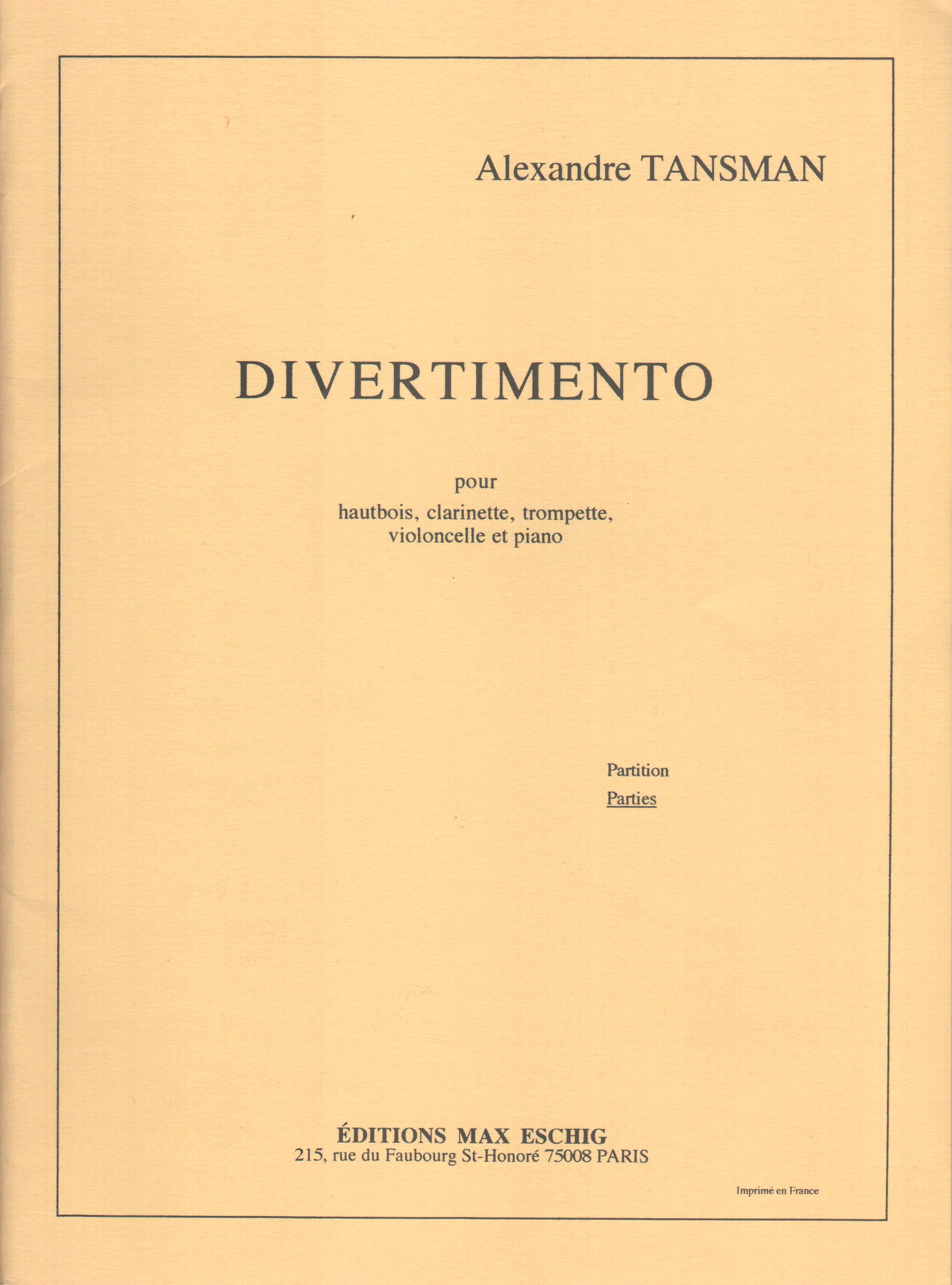
Cover of the score of Tansman's Divertimento (1944) dedicated to Arnold Schoenberg, Éditions Max Eschig

During his American years Tansman toured extensively as pianist and conductor and wrote a wealth of music, e.g. three symphonies, two quartets, works for piano. In 1944 he accepted Nathaniel Shilkret's invitation to co-create Genesis Suite, alongside Arnold Schoenberg, Darius Milhaud, Igor Stravinsky, Ernst Toch, Mario Castelnuovo-Tedesco. In the 1940s, he also wrote a few scores for Hollywood movies: i.e. Flesh and Fantasy, starring Barbara Stanwyck, a biopic of the Australian medical researcher Sister Elizabeth Kenny, starring Rosalind Russell, and Paris Underground, starring Constance Bennett. For the 1946 Academy Awards ceremony, he was nominated for an Oscar for Best Music, Scoring of a Dramatic or Comedy Picture, for Paris Underground. In 1948, Tansman published a book on Igor Stravinsky, the result of a friendship between the two composers during the years of exile in the United States.

In 1946 Tansman returned to Paris and his musical career started again all over Europe. His works, with performances at times reaching over 500 a year, were performed by the best orchestras and conductors, such as Jascha Horenstein, Rafael Kubelik, André Cluytens, Carlos Chávez, Paul Kletzki, Charles Munch, Bruno Maderna, Paul van Kempen, Sir Malcolm Sargent, Ferenc Fricsay, Charles Bruck, Øivin Fjeldstad, Eugène Bigot, Franz André, Jean Fournet, Franz Waxman, Georges Tzipine, Pedro de Freitas Branco, Alfred Wallenstein, Eduard Flipse, Robert Whitney, Manuel Rosenthal, Roger Wagner, Jean Périsson, Vassil Kazandjiev.

Despite Tansman's numerous performances far away from his home in France, he did not return to the United States after the 1946 end of his California residency. This eventually reduced the number of Americans who knew who he was.

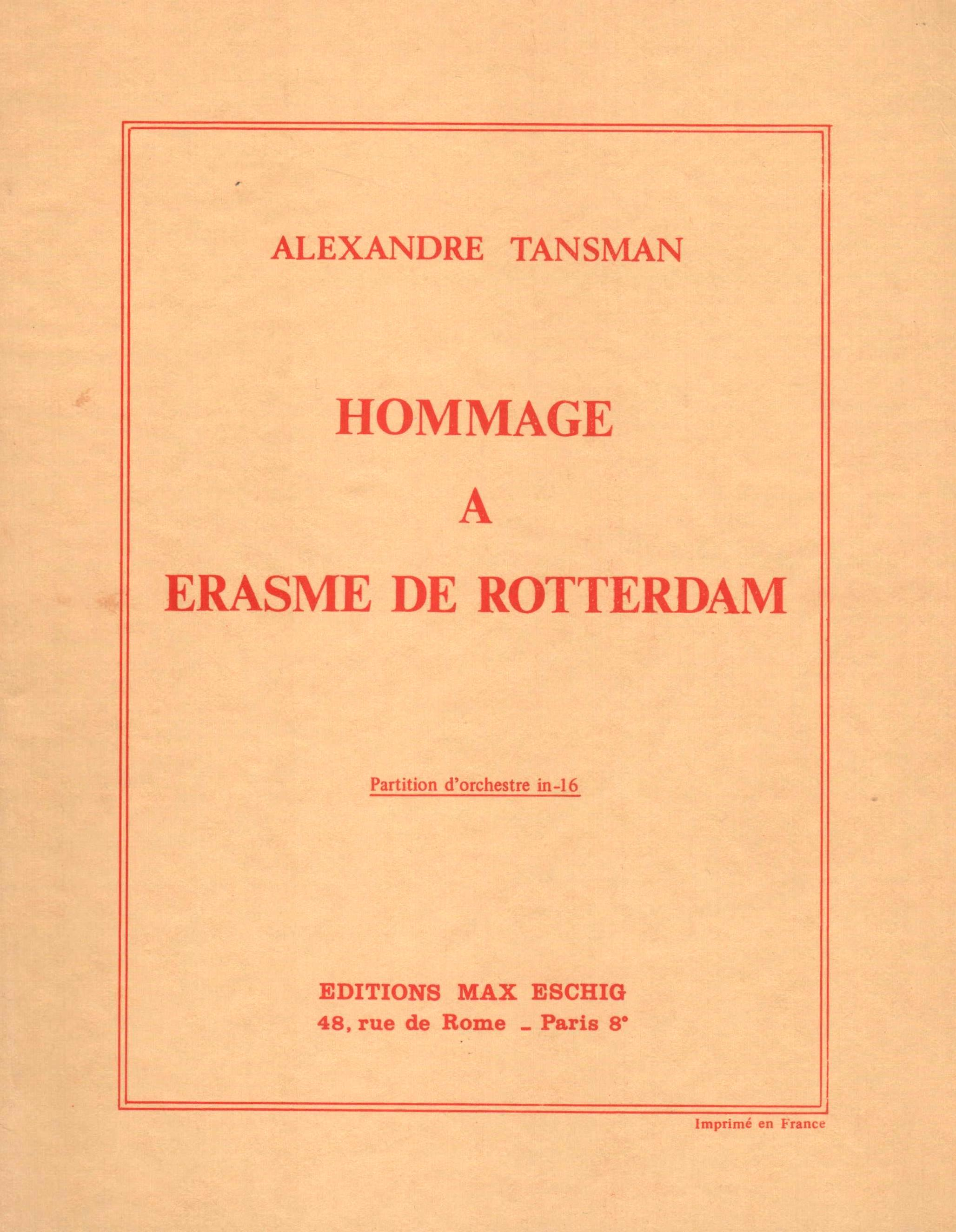
Cover of the score of Tansman's Hommage à Erasme de Rotterdam (1969), Éditions Max Eschig

As a ballet composer, for decades Tansman collaborated with the most eminent choreographers like Olga Preobrajenska, Rudolf von Laban, Jean Börlin, Adolph Bolm, Kurt Jooss, Ernst Uthoff, Françoise Adret.

In 1966, he was awarded the Hector Berlioz Prize. In 1977, in recognition of his contribution to European culture, Tansman was granted membership (after the late Dmitri Shostakovich) of the Royal Academy of Science, Letters and Fine Arts of Belgium. In 1978, he was awarded the Music Prize of the Académie Française, and in 1986 – the highest Commander grade of the Ordre des Arts et des Lettres.

Notable students of Tansman include Cristóbal Halffter, Leonardo Balada, Carmelo Bernaola, Yüksel Koptagel.

During the last period of his life, he began to reestablish connections to Poland, though his career and family kept him in France, where he lived until his death in Paris in 1986. Since 1996, in his native city of Łódź, Alexander Tansman Association for the Promotion of Culture has been organizing the Alexander Tansman International Festival and Competition of Musical Personalities (Tansman Festival).

Twenty years after the composer's death, in 2006 Henryk Górecki wrote his long-awaited 4th Symphony, which he named Tansman Episodes by no accident. Górecki left a cryptogram that explains the way he created the theme for the symphony, using musical letters from the first and last names of "Aleksander Tansman".

== Private life ==
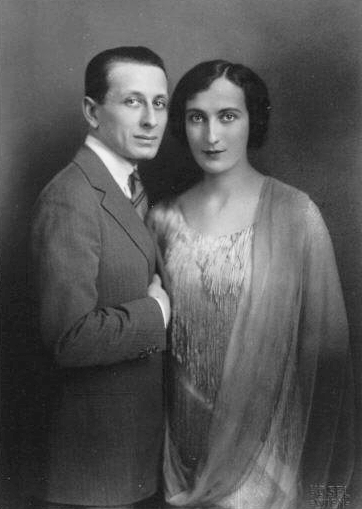
Alexander Tansman and Anna E. Broçiner, 1920s

Tansman's first wife was Anna E. Broçiner of Romanian-Swiss descent, whose family served to Royal Household of the Romanian ruling dynasty. They divorced in 1932. In 1934 he fell in love with the princess Nadejda de Bragança, daughter of Miguel, Duke de Viseu. They remained a couple until 1936. In 1937 he married a noted French pianist Colette Cras, student of Lazare Lévy and the daughter of Jean Cras, rear admiral and major general of the port of Brest, who was also a composer. They had two children.

== Music ==
Tansman was not only an internationally recognized composer, but was also a virtuoso pianist and conductor. From the 1920s, he regularly performed as pianist at Carnegie Hall and Salle Pleyel, Wigmore Hall, Salle Gaveau. He performed five concert tours in the United States, the first one as a soloist under Sergei Koussevitzky with the Boston Symphony Orchestra (1927–1928).

Many musicologists have demonstrated that Tansman's music is written in the French neoclassical style of his adopted home and the Polish national style of his birthplace, also drawing on his Jewish heritage and American dance idioms. What has often escaped attention is the significance of Edvard Grieg in the development of Tansman's earliest musical thought, which gave him the notion of "purity of design and bequeathed to him heed for folk tunes", and later on – the influence of Albert Roussel and on the other hand of Paul Dukas, which was sometimes even more distinctive than that of Igor Stravinsky, who helped him recover an absolute music form and traditional pre-Romantic aesthetics. In his departure from conventional tonality, Tansman was compared to Alexander Scriabin, whom he met personally in 1914. He adopted the extended harmonies of Maurice Ravel, since 1919 a central figure in his musical career. Furthermore, Tansman emphasized that "Ravel helped me develop a sense of economy of means, cultivate an intimate relationship between line and means of expression, and resist empty musical prattle". The composer himself also admitted and pointed to the significance and influence of Béla Bartók and Arnold Schoenberg as well, but he stressed that it should not be considered from a systematic point of view. However, both influences, that of Ravel and at the same time that of Schoenberg, were noticed by Alexis Roland-Manuel in Tansman's Little Suite (1919), a piece already stamped with a clear mark of the composer's ever stronger personality.

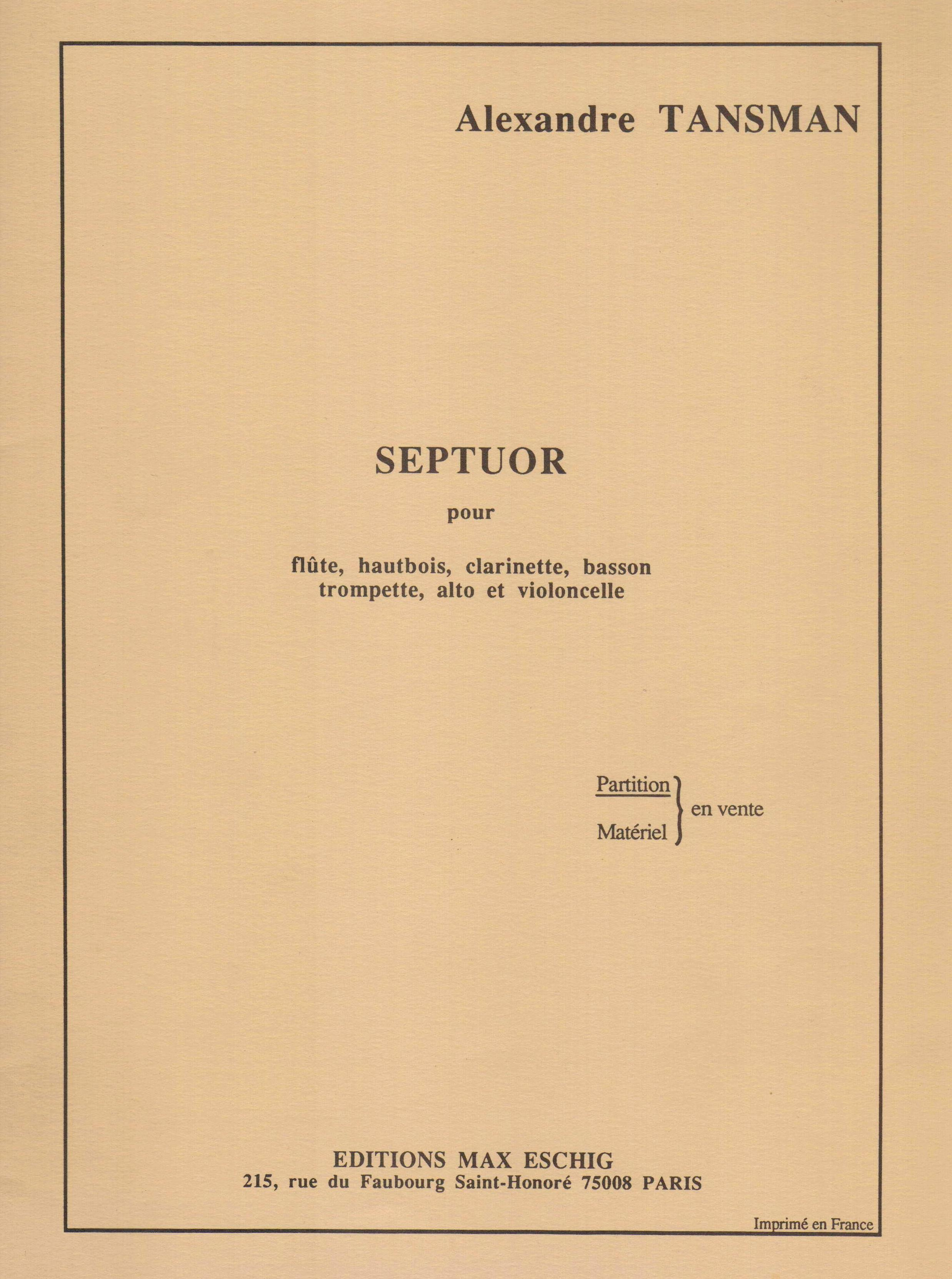
Cover of the score of Tansman's Septuor (1932) dedicated to Béla Bartók, Éditions Max Eschig

Despite his accession to the musical avant-garde, Tansman's style was never characterised by any particular radicalism, though he applied polytonality as early as 1916 (The Polish Album) and in the following years strongly contributed to its popularization worldwide. His original style, that has already manifested in the early 1920s – what was especially emphasized after the Paris premiere of his String Quartet No. 2 (1922) – was often characterised as a combination of expressive colouring, intense lyrical qualities and prolific melodic inventiveness with the ideal clarity, aristocratic elegance and precision of structure. A number of French, Belgian, Dutch, German, Austrian, Italian, Spanish and American critics admired his mastery in orchestration, instrumentation and the use of counterpoint. They spoke of the "Tansman phenomenon" and pointed to his sophisticated music language, including such of his trademarks as individual approach to form, where he introduced the so-called "bridges" or "pliers", his own expanded harmonic structures called "Tansman chords" or "the skyscrapers" and later the characteristic Tansmanian rhythmic structures.

According to Alejo Carpentier, Tansman was "one of the most gifted musical personalities of our times".

A Polish artist whose music had a global influence, Tansman interwove Polish music with a new modern language and aesthetics of the 20th century. Karol Szymanowski, fifteen years older than Tansman, also mixed Polish influences with other ethnic influences, but Tansman transcended 19th-century musical poetics and German patterns much more than Szymanowski. Moreover, Tansman became the first composer in the history of Polish music to combine an overt and predominantly classicist orientation with such a wide output and substantial achievements in contemporary art.

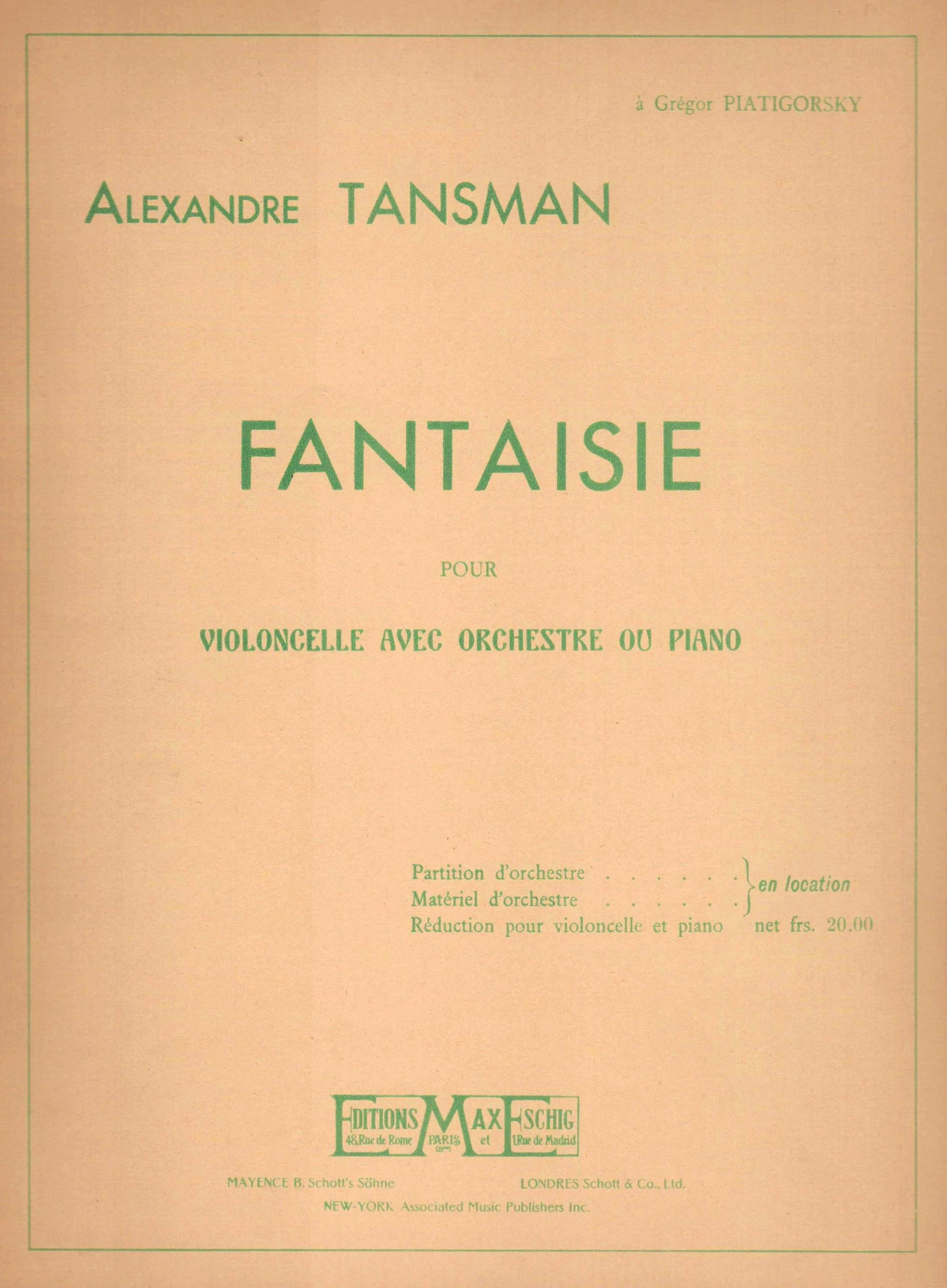
Cover of the score of Tansman's Fantaisie (1936) dedicated to Gregor Piatigorsky, Éditions Max Eschig

Tansman always described himself as a Polish composer: "It is obvious that I owe much to France, but anyone who has ever heard my compositions cannot have doubt that I have been, am and forever will be a Polish composer". After Frédéric Chopin, Tansman may be considered as one of the leading proponents of traditional Polish forms such as the mazurka or the polonaise. They were often inspired by and written in homage to Chopin. For these works, which ranged from light-hearted miniatures to virtuoso show-pieces, Tansman drew on traditional Polish folk themes, adapted them to his style, thus enriched melodic and harmonic means of modern music language, as well as its instrumental colour and rhythmic variation. However, he did not write straight settings of the folk songs, but followed the path of Bela Bartók and Manuel de Falla, as he states in an interview:

I did not use popular themes per se. I used, however, their general melodic contour. Polish folklore is abundantly rich. I think that, along with Spanish folklore, it is the richest in possibilities. I was familiar with Polish folklore very early. ... This folklore remained strongly present in my musical sensitivity but only as folklore imaginé. I have never used an actual Polish folk song in its original form, nor have I tried to reharmonize one. I find that modernizing a popular song spoils it. It must be preserved in its original harmonization. But Polish character is not solely expressed through folklore. There is something intangible in my music that reveals an aspect of my Polish origin.

As Irving Schwerke concluded: "Deeply Polish, thanks to France, Tansman became universal".

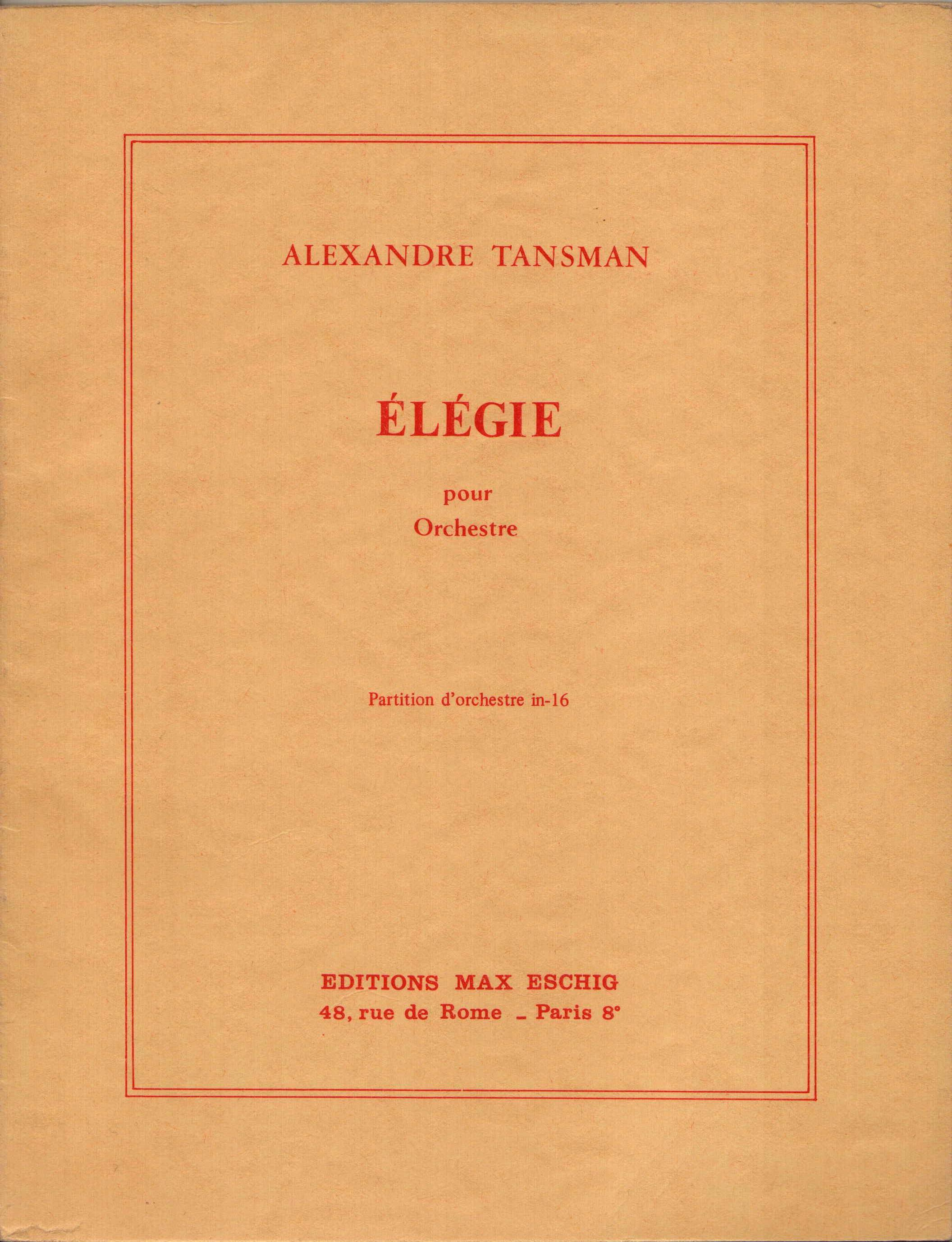
Cover of the score of Tansman's Élégie à la mémoire de Darius Milhaud (1975), Éditions Max Eschig

The key determining Tansman's artistic stance, was his constantly repeated efforts to create a new classical style. It rather meant a broader concept of being a modern classicist than sticking to neoclassical current or any other exclusive system. Although the discrepancy between Tansman's composing practice and the basic principles of neoclassicism could be observed in the 1940s, the signs of such an attitude were clearly present in his earlier works. Nevertheless, after World War II, Tansman implemented more radical techniques. The afterwar European premiere of his Sextuor à cordes (1940) heralded a "new Tansman style". He introduced more textural contrasts and metro-rhythmical complexity (Musique pour orchestre – Symphony No. 8, 1948), applied clusters (opera Sabbataï Zevi, 1957–1958), experimented with new genres and was interested in purely qualitative characteristics of sounds. The coexistence of various constructing principles in one form – an idea of integrating musical material, which he had applied and developed in his composing practice already before the war – led to the clash of different types of expression, which strengthened the drama, dynamics and power of presentation of his music. All this without breaking up with the ceaseless pursuit of his music: to find a new classical style.

When reviewing Tansman's oratorio Isaiah, the Prophet in 1955, Alfred Frankenstein and Herbert Donaldson considered it "should be counted among major works of religious music" and admired "the composer's genius".

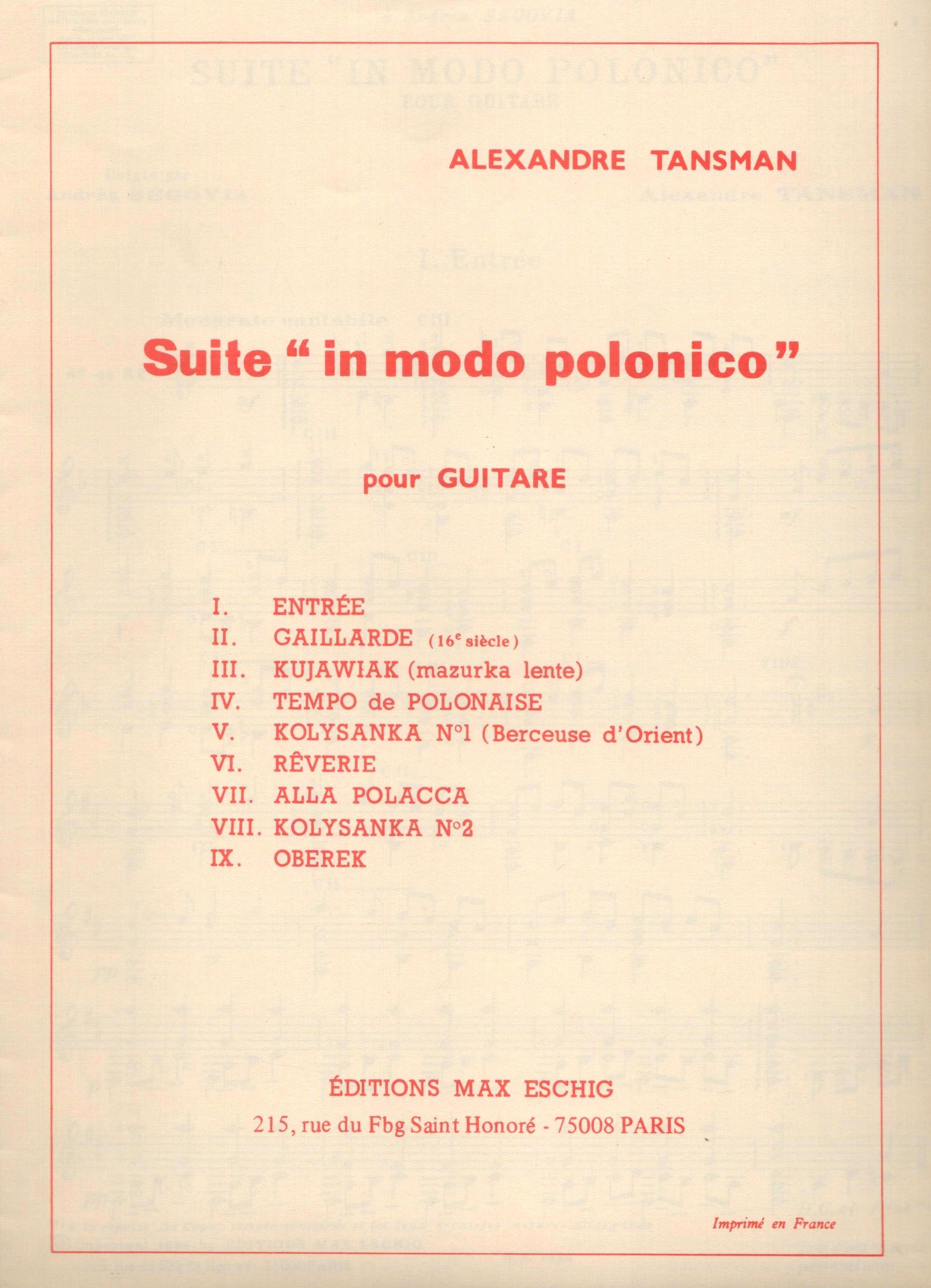
Cover of Tansman's Suite in modo polonico (1962) dedicated to Andrés Segovia, Éditions Max Eschig

Tansman composed prolifically in most genres and wrote more than 300 works, including 7 operas, 10 ballets, 6 oratorios, 80 orchestral pieces (with 9 symphonies), virtuoso concertos and substantial body of chamber music, among them 8 string quartets, tens of pieces for piano, as well as pieces for the radio theatres and pedagogical works. He is also known for his guitar pieces, mostly written for Andrés Segovia – in particular the Mazurka (1925), Cavatine (1950), Suite in modo polonico (1962), Variations sur un theme de Scriabine (1972). Segovia frequently performed the works in recordings and on tour; they are today part of the standard repertoire. Tansman's music has been performed by such artists as singers Marya Freund, Jane Bathori, Madeleine Grey, Fanély Revoil, Suzanne Danco, Jean Giraudeau, Denise Duval, Freda Betti, Xavier Depraz, Jane Rhodes, Andrée Esposito, flautists Louis Fleury, Maxence Larrieu, clarinetist Louis Cahuzac, harpsichordist Marcelle de Lacour, pianists Jonathan Plowright, Marie-Aimée Roger-Miclos, Léo-Pol Morin, Mieczysław Horszowski, Walter Gieseking, Youra Guller, Jan Smeterlin, Robert Schmitz, Dimitri Tiomkin, Nicole Henriot-Schweitzer, José Iturbi, Arturo Benedetti Michelangeli, Alicia de Larrocha, violinists Stefan Frenkel, Bronisław Huberman, Hélène Jourdan-Morhange, Joseph Szigeti, Alexander Mogilevsky, Henri Temianka, Jascha Heifetz, cellists Pablo Casals, Gregor Piatigorsky, Maurice Maréchal, Enrico Mainardi, Gaspar Cassadó, organist Marie-Louise Girod, quartets Pro Arte, Burgin, Budapest, Calvet, Paganini, Pascal, Parrenin, trio Pasquier.

Almost all his works have been now recorded on CDs.

== Selected works ==
Alexander Tansman's many hundreds of compositions include:

- Album polski (The Polish Album) for piano (1915–1916)
- Symphonie No. 1 [later withdrawn] (1916)
- Sérénade No. 1 for Orchestra (1916)
- String Quartet No. 1 (1917)
- Huit Mélodies japonaises à Marya Freund for voice and piano or orchestra (1918)
- Sonate No. 2 à Bronisław Huberman for violin and piano (1919)
- Petite Suite (The Little Suite) for piano (1919)
- Impressions à Vladimir Golschmann for orchestra (1920)
- Intermezzo sinfonico for orchestra (1920)
- String Quartet No. 2 (1922)
- Sonatine à Mieczyslaw Horszowski for piano (1923)
- Scherzo sinfonico à Serge Koussevitzky for orchestra (1923)
- Huon de Bordeaux (Huon of Bordeaux), suite for orchestra (1923)
- Sextuor, ballet d'après une nouvelle de Alexandre Arnoux (1923)
- La Danse de la Sorcière (Dance of the Sorceress) for orchestra (1923)
- Vingt pièces faciles sur des mélodies populaires polonaises à Ignacy Jan Paderewski for piano (1917–1924)
- Sinfonietta No. 1 for orchestra (1924)
- Sonata rustica à Maurice Ravel for piano (1925)
- Piano Concerto No. 1 à Édouard Ganche (1925)
- Symphonie No. 2 (1926)
- La Nuit kurde (The Kurdish Night), opera (1927)
- Piano Concerto No. 2 à Charlie Chaplin (1927)
- Suite for Two Pianos and Orchestra (1928)
- Mazurkas à Albert Roussel for piano (1918–1928)
- Toccata à Pierre Monteux for orchestra (1928–1929)
- Suite – Divertissement for violin, viola, cello and piano (1929)
- Le Cercle Éternel (The Eternal Circle), ballet (1929)
- Cinq Pièces à Joseph Szigeti for violin and orchestra (1930)
- Sonatine Transatlantique for piano (1930)
- Triptyque (Triptych) for string orchestra (1930)
- Concertino à Jose Iturbi for piano and orchestra (1931)
- Quatre danses polonaises (Four Polish Dances) for orchestra (1931)
- Symphonie No. 3 (Symphonie Concertante) à Sa Majesté la Reine Elisabeth de Belgique for piano, violin, viola, cello and orchestra (1931)
- Septuor à Béla Bartók for flute, oboe, clarinet, bassoon, trumpet, viola, cello (1932)
- La Grande Ville à Kurt Jooss, ballet (1932–1933)
- Rapsodie hébraïque for orchestra (1933)
- Sonatine No. 3 à Walter Spies for piano (1933)
- Bric à Brac à Vladimir de Terlikowski, ballet (1935)
- Fantaisie à Gregor Piatigorsky for cello and orchestra or piano (1936)
- Concerto for Viola and Orchestra (1936–1937)
- Concerto for Violin and Orchestra (1937)
- Variations sur un theme de Frescobaldi for string orchestra (1937)
- Piano Trio No. 2 (1938)
- Symphonie No. 4 (1939)
- La Toison d'or (The Golden Fleece), opera (1939) – world premiere: 2016, Tansman Festival, Lodz Grand Opera
- Rapsodie polonaise (The Polish Rhapsody) for orchestra (1940)
- Sextuor à cordes à Igor Stravinsky for 2 violins, 2 violas, 2 cellos (1940)
- Symphonie No. 5 à Paul Kletzki (1942)
- Pièce concertante (Konzertstück) for piano (left hand) and orchestra to Paul Wittgenstein (1943)
- Symphonie No. 6 "In Memoriam" for mixed choir and orchestra (1944)
- Adam and Eve, part 3 of Genesis Suite, for narrator and orchestra (1944)
- Divertimento à Arnold Schönberg for oboe, clarinet, trumpet, cello and piano (1944)
- Symphonie No. 7 "Lyrique" (1944)
- Kol-Nidrei for tenor solo, mixed choir and orgue (1945)
- Two Ancient Polish Religious Songs for mixed choir and orgue (1945)
- Concertino à Andrés Segovia for guitar and orchestra (1945)
- Musique pour cordes for string orchestra (1947)
- Musique pour orchestre (Symphonie No. 8) à Franz André (1948)
- Les Voyages de Magellan (Magellan's Travels), suite for orchestra (1949)
- Tombeau de Chopin for string quintet or string orchestra (1949)
- Isaïe le prophète (Isaiah, The Prophet), symphonic oratorio for tenor solo, choir and orchestra (1949–1950)
- Cavatine à Andrés Segovia for guitar (1950)
- Sinfonia Piccola (1951-1952)
- Concertino for Oboe, Clarinet and String Orchestra (1952)
- Christophe Colomb (Christopher Columbus), suite for orchestra (1952)
- Sonatina da camera for flute, violon, viola, cello and harpe (1952)
- Le Serment (The Oath) à Henry Barraud, opera (1953)
- Concerto pour orchestre à Darius Milhaud (1954)
- Hommage à Manuel de Falla for guitar and chamber orchestra (1954)
- Sonate No. 5, to the memory of Béla Bartók for piano (1955)
- Partita à Gaspar Cassadó for cello and piano (1955)
- String Quartet No. 8 (1956)
- Prologue et Cantata for mixed choir and chamber orchestra (1957)
- Concerto à Louis Cahuzac for clarinet and orchestra (1957)
- Sabbataï Zevi, le faux messie (Sabbatai Zevi, the False Messiah), opera (1957–1958)
- Symphonie No. 9 (1957–1958)
- Suite Baroque à Sa Majesté la Reine Elisabeth de Belgique for chamber orchestra (1958)
- Les Habits Neufs du Roi à Charles Bruck, ballet pantomime d'après Hans Christian Andersen (1958–1959)
- Suite for Bassoon and Piano (1960)
- Musique de cour à Andrés Segovia for guitar and chamber orchestra (1960)
- Psaumes (The Psalms) à Salvador de Madariaga for tenor solo, choir and orchestra (1960–1961)
- Résurrection (d'après Léon Tolstoï, The Resurrection), ballet (1961–1962)
- Suite in modo polonico à Andrés Segovia for guitar (1962)
- Six Mouvements à Pierre Capdevielle for string orchestra (1962–1963)
- L'Usignolo di Boboli, opera (1963)
- Fantaisie à Diane et André Gertler for violin and piano (1963)
- Concerto à Charles Reneau for cello and orchestra (1963–1964)
- Hommage à Chopin à Andrés Segovia for guitar (1966)
- Suite Concertante for Oboe and Chamber Orchestra (1966)
- Quatre mouvements à mes amis Lulu et Vladimir Jankélévitch for orchestra (1967–1968)
- Concertino for Flute, String Orchestra and Piano (1968)
- Hommage à Erasme de Rotterdam (Homage to Erasmus of Rotterdam) for orchestra (1968–1969)
- Stèle in memoriam Igor Stravinsky for orchestra (1972)
- Élégie, to the memory of Darius Milhaud for orchestra (1975)
- Sinfonietta No. 2 for orchestra (1978)
- L'Oiseau qui n'existe pas for Claude Aveline for piano (1978)
- Les Dix Commandements (The Ten Commandments) for orchestra (1978–1979)
- Huit Stèles de Victor Segalen (Eight Steles of Victor Segalen) for voice and chamber orchestra (1979)
- Album d'amis for piano (1980)
- Musique à Nicanor Zabaleta for harpe and orchestra (1981)
- Hommage à Lech Wałęsa for guitar (1982)
- Alla Polacca for viola and piano (1985)
- 7 operas (1927; 1939; Le roi qui jouait fou 1948; 1953; 1957–1958; 1963; Georges Dandin 1973–1974)
- 10 ballets (1922; 1923; Lumieres 1927; Le Cercel eternel 1929; 1935; 1944; He, She and I 1946; Le train de nuit 1951; 1958–1959; 1961–1962)
- 9 symphonies (1917; 1926; 1931; 1939; 1942; Lyrique 1944; 1948; 1957–1958)
- 8 string quartets (1917; 1922; 1925; 1935; 1940; 1944; 1947; 1956)

Film music: Poil de Carotte, dir. Julien Duvivier (1932), La Chatelaine du Liban, dir. Jean Epstein (1933), Flesh and Fantasy, dir. Julien Duvivier (1943), Destiny, dir. Reginald LeBorg (1944), Paris Underground, dir. Gregory Ratoff (1945), Sister Kenny, dir. Dudley Nichols (1946).

== Selected recordings ==
- Symphonie no. 5, Stele, Quatre mouvements – Czecho-Slovak State Philharmonic Orchestra, Meir Minsky, conductor – Marco Polo, Naxos – 1991
- Complete Music for String Quartet: String Quartets nos. 2–8 – Silesian String Quartet – Etcetera – 1992
- Piano Sonatas and Sonatinas – Daniel Blumenthal, piano – Etcetera – 1993
- Concerto pour orchestre, Etudes for orchestra, Capriccio for orchestra – Moscow Symphony Orchestra, Antonio de Almeida, conductor – Marco Polo, Naxos – 1995
- Piano Concerto no. 2 – Polish Radio and Television Symphony Orchestra in Cracow, Zygmunt Rychert, conductor, Marek Drewnowski, piano – Alexander Tansman Association for the Promotion of Culture, Joseph Hofmann Foundation – 1996
- Fantaisie – Igor Zubkovski, cello, Irina Khovanskaia, piano – Alexander Tansman International Competition of Musical Personalities, DUX – 1996
- Violin Concerto, Cinq Pieces, Quatre danses polonaises, Danse de la Sorciere, Rapsodie polonaise – Polish Radio Symphony Orchestra, Bernard Le Monnier, conductor, Beata Halska, violin – Olympia – 2000
- Divertimento, Sinfonia piccola, Sinfoniettas nos. 1, 2 – Virtuosi di Praga, Israel Yinon, conductor, Koch-Schwann – 2000
- Bric a Brac, Symphonie no. 4 – Bamberger Symphoniker, Israel Yinon, conductor – Koch-Schwann – 2000
- Cello concerto, Fantaisie for cello and orchestra, The Ten Commandments – Radio-Philharmonie Hannover, Israel Yinon, conductor, Sebastian Hess, cello – Koch-Schwann – 2001
- Isaie le prophete – Sinfonia Varsovia, Wojciech Michniewski, conductor, Alberto Mizrahi, tenor – City of Lodz, Alexander Tansman Association for the Promotion of Culture – 2004
- Genesis Suite – Rundfunk-Sinfonieorchester Berlin, Gerard Schwarz, conductor, Tovah Feldshuh, Barbara Feldon, David Margulies, Fritz Weaver, Isaiah Sheffer – speakers – Milken Family Foundation, Naxos – 2004
- Suite in modo polonico, Cavatina – Andres Segovia, guitar – Deutsche Grammophon – 2004, 2006
- Musique pour orchestre – Symphonie no. 8 – Royal Concertgebouw Orchestra, Rafael Kubelik, conductor – Centrum Nederlandse Muziek, Radio Netherlands International, NM Classics – 2005
- Symphonies nos. 2, 4, 5, 6, 7, 8 and 9, Quatre mouvements – Melbourne Symphony Orchestra, Oleg Caetani, conductor – Chandos – 2006–2008
- Variations sur un theme de Frescobaldi, Triptych, Musique pour cordes, Partita for string orchestra – Amadeus Polish Radio Chamber Orchestra, Agnieszka Duczmal, conductor – Alexander Tansman Association for the Promotion of Culture, Polish Radio – 2006
- Le Serment – Orchestre Philharmonique de Radio France, Choeur de Radio France, Alain Atinoglu, conductor, Helene Collerette, violon, Marie Devellereau, Jean-Sebastein Bou, Fabrice Dallis, Alain Gabriel, Delphine Haidan – soloists, Eric Genovese, reciter – Radio France, Harmonia Mundi – 2007
- Sinfoniettas nos. 1, 2, Sinfonia piccola, Sinfonie de chambre – Orchestra della Svizzera Italiana, Oleg Caetani, conductor – Chandos – 2009
- Piano Concerto no. 2 – Orchestre Philharmonique de Radio France, Steven Sloane, conductor, David Greilsammer, piano – Naïve – 2010
- Clarinet Concerto, Concertino for oboe, clarinet and string orchestra, Six Mouvements – Silesian Chamber Orchestra, Miroslaw Jacek Blaszczyk, conductor, Laurent Decker, oboe, Jean-Marc Fessard, clarinet – Naxos – 2011
- Piano Concertino, Piece concertante, Elegie, Stele – Branderburgisches Staatsorchester Frankfurt, Howard Griffiths, conductor, Christian Seibert, piano – CPO – 2012
- From Trio to Octet: Suite-Divertissement, Musica a cinque, Musique a six, Sextuor a cordes, Sonatina da camera, Tombeau de Chopin – Silesian String Quartet, Beata Bilinska, piano, Joanna Liberadzka, harpe, Jan Krzeszowiec, flute, Piotr Szymyslik, clarinet, Roman Widaszek, clarinet, Adam Krzeszowiec, cello, Krzysztof Firlus, double bass – Alexander Tansman Association for the Promotion of Culture, Classica – 2012
- Triptyque, Isaie le prophete – The Zimbler Sinfonietta, Choeur et Orchestre Philharmonique de la Radio d'Hilversum, Paul van Kempen, conductor – Forgotten Records – 2012
- Music for violin and piano: Sonatas, Sonatinas, Romance, Fantaisie – Klaidi Sahatçi, violin, Giorgio Koukl, piano – Naxos – 2015
- Suite for oboe and orchestra, Clarinet Concerto, Concertino for oboe, clarinet and string orchestra, Adagio for string orchestra – Malta Philharmonic Orchestra, Brian Schembri, conductor, Diego Dini Ciacci, oboe, Fabrizio Meloni, clarinet – CPO – 2016
- Ballet Music: Sextuor, Bric a Brac – Polish Radio Orchestra, Wojciech Michniewski, Lukasz Borowicz – conductors – Tansman Festival – CPO – 2017
- Kol Nidrei – Ensemble Choral Copernic, Itai Daniel, conductor, Sebastien Obrecht, tenor, Nicole Wiener, organ – Institut Europeen des Musiques Juives – 2018
- 11 Interludes, Hommage a Arthur Rubinstein, 2 Pieces hebraiques, Prelude et Toccata, 6 Caprices, Etude-studio – Giorgio Koukl, piano – Grand Piano – 2019
- The Polish Rhapsody – Warsaw Philharmonic Orchestra, Jacek Kasprzyk, conductor – The National Frederic Chopin Institute, NIFCCD – 2019
- Isaiah, The Prophet – Netherlands Radio Philharmonic Orchestra, Netherlands Radio Philharmonic Choir, Paul van Kempen, conductor, Cornelis Kalkman, tenor – Decca – 2020
- Danse de la Sorciere – Les solistes de l'Orchestre de Paris, Laurent Wagschal, piano – Indésens Records – 2020
- Musique de cour – Orchestre National du Capitole de Toulouse, Ben Glassberg, conductor, Thibaut Garcia, guitar – Erato Records – 2020
