= List of symphonies in C-sharp minor =

The list of symphonies in C♯ minor includes:

Composer	Symphony
Joseph Abrams	Symphony No.1
Ernest Bloch	Symphony in C♯ minor (1902)
Siegfried Borris	Symphony No. 5, Op. 61 (1943)
Havergal Brian	Symphony No. 3 (1931–32); Symphony No. 16 (1960); Symphony No. 20 (1962)
Dimitrie Cuclin	Symphony No. 9 (1949)
Wilhelm Furtwängler	Symphony No. 3 (1951-54)
David Hackbridge Johnson	Symphony No. 9, Op. 295 (2012)
Dmitri Kabalevsky	Symphony No.1, Op. 18 (1932)
Joseph Martin Kraus	Symphony in C♯ minor, VB 140.
Glenn Clarence Kruspe	Symphony in C♯ minor (1947)
Artur Lemba	Symphony No. 1 (1908)
Albéric Magnard	Symphony No. 4, Op. 21 (1913)
Gustav Mahler	Symphony No. 5 (1901-2)
George Alexander Macfarren	Symphony No. 7 (1839-40)
John Blackwood McEwen	Symphony No. 5 "Solway" (1911)
Nikolai Myaskovsky	Symphony No. 2, Op. 11 (1910-11)
Wilhelm Petersen	Symphony No. 3 (1931-32)
Hans Pfitzner	Symphony in C♯ minor, Op. 36a (1932, Adapted from String Quartet Op. 36)
Sergei Prokofiev	Symphony No. 7, Op. 131 (1952)
Ture Rangström	Symphony No. 1 "August Strindberg in Memoriam" (1914)
Julius Röntgen	Symphony No. 8 (1930)
Vissarion Shebalin	Symphony No. 2, Op. 11 (1929)
Alexandre Tansman	Symphony No. 4 (1936-39)
Solon C. Verret	Symphony No. 1?
