= Symphony No. 4 (Tansman) =

Symphony by Alexander Tansman

The Symphony No. 4 in C-sharp minor by Alexander Tansman was written between 1936 and 1939. In the meantime Tansman acquired French citizenship and married pianist Colette Cras, to whom the symphony is dedicated (À ma femme). Despite dating from his most successful period it was not premiered in his lifetime, only receiving its first performance in a 1998 studio recording by the Bamberg Symphony conducted by Israel Yinon, 12 years after the composer's death.

It lasts around 20 to 25 minutes and consists of three movements: a tense Allegro with a somber slow introduction, an introspective Adagio for strings alone and a contrapuntal finale fusing baroque and jazz influences which has been compared to Hindemith.

1. Adagio – Allegro deciso
2. Adagio tranquillo
3. Allegro giocoso

== Recordings ==
- (Germany) Bamberg Symphony — Israel Yinon, 2001. Koch Schwann
- (Poland) Podlasie Philharmonic — Marcin Nałęcz-Niesiołowski. Dux
- (Australia) Melbourne Symphony — Oleg Caetani, 2005. Chandos
