= Orchestra Sinfonica di Milano Giuseppe Verdi =

Italian orchestra based in Milan, Italy

Orchestra Sinfonica di Milano
- Orchestra
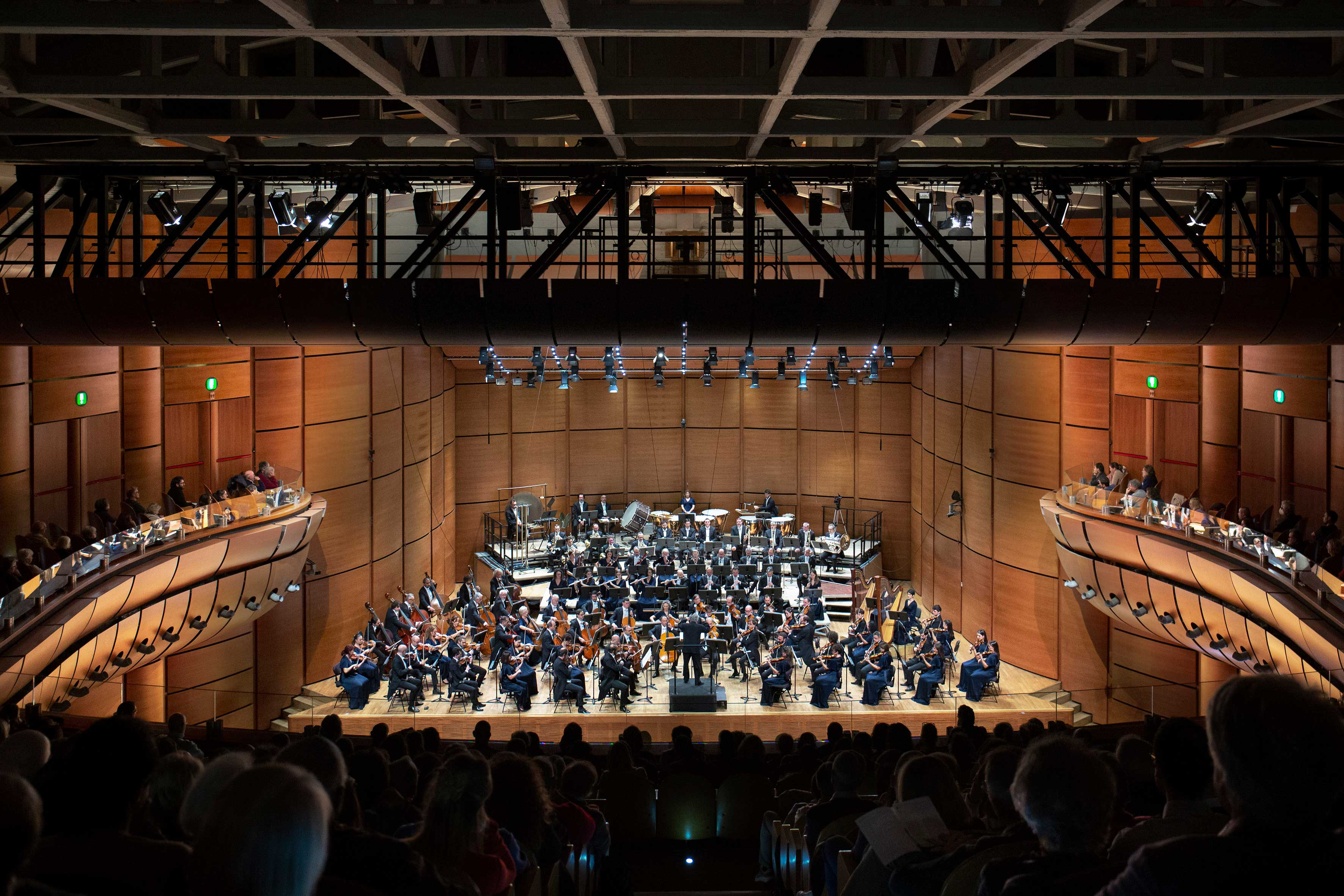
- Founded: 1993 - Active
- Location: Milan
- Concert hall: Auditorium di Milano Fondazione Cariplo
- Principal conductor: Emmanuel Tjeknavorian
- Concertmaster: Luca Santaniello / Nicolai Freiherr von Dellingshausen
- Website: sinfonicadimilano.org

Orchestra Sinfonica di Milano Giuseppe Verdi is an Italian symphony orchestra founded in 1993 by Vladimir Delman, Marcello Abbado, and Luigi Corbani. The orchestra is based in Milan, at the Auditorium di Milano Fondazione Cariplo, located in Largo Gustav Mahler. The music directorate includes Riccardo Chailly (honorary conductor), Xian Zhang (emeritus conductor), and Claus Peter Flor (emeritus conductor). Nicola Campogrande is the composer in residence. The new music director starting from the 2024/25 season is Emmanuel Tjeknavorian.

== History ==
The orchestra was founded in 1993 by Vladimir Delman, who had previously served as the conductor of the Orchestra Sinfonica di Milano della RAI before it was dissolved. Following Maestro Delman’s death the following year, Welsh conductor Alun Francis was appointed as music director, and under his leadership, the orchestra embarked on a journey through the 19th and 20th-century symphonic repertoire. From 1999 to 2005, Riccardo Chailly held the position of music director, and he is now honorary conductor.

Since its foundation, the Orchestra Sinfonica di Milano has performed at its home venue in Milan (the Auditorium di Milano in Largo Gustav Mahler). In 2002, in addition to being the resident orchestra of the Festival dei Due Mondi in Spoleto, it embarked on its first European tour, performing in France, Spain, Portugal, and Switzerland. In 2003, under the direction of Oleg Caetani, the orchestra toured Chile, Argentina, and Brazil, and later that year, conducted by Riccardo Chailly, it performed in the major concert halls of Japan in a tour featuring Martha Argerich and the Coro Sinfonico di Milano, conducted by Romano Gandolfi.

In 2004, the orchestra, conducted by Riccardo Chailly, made its debut at the Canary Islands Festival and was engaged as the resident orchestra at the Festival delle Nazioni in Città di Castello. In 2005, the Orchestra Sinfonica di Milano, conducted by Eiji Oue and featuring violinist Hilary Hahn, toured Germany and France, continuing with concerts, under the guidance of Riccardo Chailly, in major European cities such as Frankfurt, Vienna, and Budapest. In the same year, the orchestra made its debut at the 68th Maggio Musicale Fiorentino in May 2005. In the autumn of 2006, under the direction of Maestro Marko Letonja, the orchestra embarked on its first Italian tour.

On April 24, 2008, on the occasion of the third anniversary of Pope Benedict XVI's papacy, the Orchestra Sinfonica and Coro Sinfonico di Milano, conducted by Oleg Caetani, performed at the Vatican in the presence of Pope Benedict XVI and President Giorgio Napolitano. In December 2008, the orchestra was invited to Baku, Azerbaijan, for the II Mstislav Rostropovich International Festival. In 2011, with three performances of Georges Bizet's Carmen, the orchestra opened the inaugural celebrations of the Royal Opera House in Muscat, Oman, which is positioning itself among the "top ten" of the world’s best theatres.

In 2012, the orchestra embarked on another tour in Russia and, in the presence of Pope Benedict XVI in Milan for the VII World Meeting of Families, provided the musical part of the liturgy. In 2013, following a tour in Germany with violinist David Garrett, the orchestra was invited to perform at the BBC Proms, universally regarded as the number one festival in the world for symphonic programming by large orchestras. Conducted by its music director, Xian Zhang, and featuring solo tenor Joseph Calleja, The orchestra performed Giuseppe Verdi’s music, transitioning to pure symphonic works with Tchaikovsky's Manfred Symphony.

In November 2022, the Orchestra Sinfonica di Milano and its Coro Sinfonico undertook a European tour to Amsterdam (Het Concertgebouw), Barcelona (L'Auditori), Madrid (Auditorio Nacional de Música Madrid), and Alicante (Adda Alicante – Auditorio – Concert Hall), dedicated to the performance of Giuseppe Verdi’s Requiem, with a cast featuring Carmela Remigio (soprano), Anna Bonitatibus (mezzo-soprano), Valentino Buzza (tenor), and Fabrizio Beggi (bass). The Choral Director was Massimo Fiocchi Malaspina.

Alongside its concert activity, the orchestra has developed a discography that spans from Verdi and Rossini repertoires to the grand Romantic and Russian symphonic works.

== Mahler Festival 2023 ==
Between October and November 2023, the Orchestra Sinfonica di Milano presented the Mahler Festival. From October 22 to November 13, 2023, the festival featured, for the first time in Italy, the complete performance of Gustav Mahler's symphonies and orchestral song cycles, with the participation of ten prominent Italian orchestras: Filarmonica della Scala, Orchestra dell'Accademia Nazionale di Santa Cecilia, Spira Mirabilis, Orchestra I Pomeriggi Musicali, Orchestra della Toscana, Orchestra Giovanile Italiana, Orchestra Sinfonica Nazionale della Rai, Orchestra della Fondazione Arena di Verona, Orchestra Haydn di Bolzano e Trento, and Filarmonica Arturo Toscanini. The festival also featured the performance of Symphony No. 8 in E-flat Major (Symphony of a Thousand), conducted by Maestro Claus Peter Flor, at the Duomo di Milano. On April 25, 2024, the Mahler Festival was awarded the Special Prize at the 43rd edition of the Italian Music Critics' Award "Franco Abbiati".

== Artistic Groups ==
The Coro Sinfonico di Milano, founded in 1998 under the musical direction of Romano Gandolfi, is currently led by Massimo Fiocchi Malaspina. The Coro Sinfonico consists of 100 members capable of tackling the lyrical-symphonic, chamber, and polyphonic repertoire, spanning from the Baroque to the 20th century.

Other choral formations of the Foundation include the Coro di Voci Bianche di Milano, founded in the autumn of 2001 and currently made up of about 30 boys and girls aged between 8 and 18, and Coro I Giovani di Milano, composed of young people between the ages of 15 and 25, some of whom come from the Coro di Voci Bianche and others who do not. This group focuses on a musical path specifically aimed at vocal and performance education in mixed-voice repertoires. The Maestro of the youth choral formations is Maria Teresa Tramontin.

Among the Foundation’s musical ensembles is also the Orchestra Amatoriale di Milano, composed of about 100 members, an orchestra open to any enthusiast who, although having studied an instrument, did not make music their profession. It is one of the few examples of active stable amateur orchestras in Italy. In 2008, the ensemble won the first prize in the "Filippo Siebaneck" category of the XXVII Franco Abbiati Prize for Italian music criticism.

Completing the roster of formations are the Orchestra Sinfonica Junior and the Orchestra Sinfonica Kids, currently conducted by Marcello Corti and Pilar Bravo, respectively.

== Conductors ==
Throughout its history, the orchestra has hosted some of the most distinguished conductors of the second half of the 20th century, including Carlo Maria Giulini, Peter Maag, Georges Prêtre, Vladimir Fedoseyev, Helmuth Rilling, Patrick Fournillier, Riccardo Muti, and Riccardo Chailly. It has also been conducted by Valery Gergiev, Rudolf Barshai, Claus Peter Flor, Christopher Hogwood, Marko Letonja, Daniele Gatti, Roberto Abbado, Ivor Bolton, Kazushi Ono, Vladimir Jurowski, Yakov Kreizberg, Ulf Schirmer, Eiji Oue, Herbert Blomstedt, Krzysztof Penderecki, Leonard Slatkin, Vladimir Fedoseev, and Wayne Marshall.

== Recordings ==
- 2000 – Giuseppe Verdi: Heroines – conductor: Riccardo Chailly (Decca, DDD)
- 2000 – Giuseppe Verdi: Messa Solenne – conductor: Riccardo Chailly (Decca, DDD 00289 467 2802)
- 2001 – Cinema Italiano (with Lucio Dalla, Deborah Harry, Filippa Giordano, Luciano Pavarotti and Sting) – conductor: Luis Bacalov (Decca, 467 050-2)
- 2002 – Sacred Song, with Plácido Domingo – conductor: Marcello Viotti (Deutsche Grammophon, DDD)
- 2003 – Dmitri Shostakovich: Symphonies Nos. 5 & 6 – conductor: Oleg Caetani (ARTS music)
- 2003 – Bruno Maderna: Grande Aulodia – conductor: Sandro Gorli (Stradivarius, DDD)
- 2003 – Bruno Maderna: Liriche su Verlaine – conductor: Sandro Gorli (Stradivarius, DDD)
- 2003 – Theater Brass at Cinecittà: Ensemble di ottoni e di percussioni dell'Orchestra Sinfonica di Milano Giuseppe Verdi – David Short (Beat Records)
- 2003 – Nino Rota: Lo scoiattolo – Erna Collaku, Francesco Palmieri, Luciano Miotto – conductor: Giuseppe Grazioli (La Bottega Discantica, DDD)
- 2003 – Giacomo Puccini: Integrale per quartetto d'archi (Decca, DDD)
- 2003 – Dmitri Shostakovich: Symphony No. 7 – conductor: Oleg Caetani (ARTS music)
- 2003 – Una furtiva lagrima, Juan Diego Flórez – conductor: Riccardo Frizza (Decca, DDD 00289 473 4402)
- 2003 – Rossini Arias, Juan Diego Flórez – conductor: Riccardo Chailly (Decca, DDD 00289 470 0242)
- 2003 – Verdi Discoveries – conductor: Riccardo Chailly (Decca, DDD 00289 473 7672)
- 2003 – Rossini Discoveries – Laura Giordano, Ildar Abdrazakov, Michele Pertusi – conductor: Riccardo Chailly (Decca, DDD)
- 2003 – Puccini Discoveries – Taigi, Calleja, Mastromarino, Urbanova, Volonté – conductor: Riccardo Chailly (Decca, DDD 00289 475 3202)
- 2004 – Ramón Vargas: Between Friends – conductor: Vjekoslav Sutej (RCA)
- 2004 – Joseph Calleja: Tenor Arias – conductor Riccardo Chailly (Decca, DDD 00289 470 6482)
- 2004 – Sempre libera – Anna Netrebko – conductor: Claudio Abbado (DG)
- 2004 – Dmitri Shostakovich: Symphonies Nos. 9 & 10 – conductor: Oleg Caetani (ARTS music)
- 2004 – Dmitri Shostakovich: Symphony No. 4 – conductor: Oleg Caetani (ARTS music)
- 2004 – Great Tenor Arias, Juan Diego Flórez – conductor: Carlo Rizzi (Decca, DDD 00289 475 5502)
- 2004 – Puccini, Arie – conductor: Anton Coppola (EMI Classics)
- 2004 – Luciano Berio, Orchestral transcriptions – conductor: Riccardo Chailly (Decca, DDD 00289 476 2830)
- 2005 – Dmitri Shostakovich: Symphony No. 8 – conductor Oleg Caetani (ARTS music)
- 2005 – Dmitri Shostakovich: Symphony No. 11 – conductor: Oleg Caetani (ARTS music)
- 2006 – Dmitri Shostakovich: Chamber Symphonies Nos. 1-5 – conductor: Rudolf Barshai (Brilliant Classics, EAN Code 5029365821223)
- 2006 – Forbidden Love – conductor: Roberto Rizzi Brignoli (Sony Classical)
- 2006 – Dmitri Shostakovich: Symphonies Nos. 2 & 12 – conductor: Oleg Caetani (ARTS music)
- 2006 – Dmitri Shostakovich: Symphony No. 13 ("Babi Yar") – Orchestra Sinfonica e Coro Sinfonico di Milano Giuseppe Verdi – conductor: Oleg Caetani (ARTS music)
- 2006 – Dmitri Shostakovich: Symphonies Nos. 1, 10 & 15 – conductor: Oleg Caetani (ARTS music)
- 2006 – Dmitri Shostakovich: Symphonies Nos. 3 & 14 – conductor: Oleg Caetani (ARTS music)
- 2006 – Dmitri Shostakovich: Complete Symphonies – conductor: Oleg Caetani (ARTS music)
- 2008 – Umberto Giordano: Andrea Chénier – conductor: Vjekoslav Sutej. (Universal, DDD)
- 2008 – "Cielo e mar" – conductor: Daniele Callegari (Deutsche Grammophon, 477 7224)
- 2008 – Paul Hindemith, La Storia di Tuttifäntchen (Christmas fable) – conductor: Fabrizio Dorsi (La Bottega Discantica)
- 2008 – Verdissimo Arias by Giuseppe Verdi – conductor: Oleg Caetani (Warner Music)
- 2008 – Andrea Bocelli, Incanto – conductor: Steven Mercurio (Sugar Music)
- 2016 – Weill, Carpi, Rota: Opera da tre soldi/Circus Suite/Ogni anno punto e da capo – conductor: Giuseppe Grazioli (Decca)
- 2016 – Rota, Opere sacre – conductor: Giuseppe Grazioli (Decca)
- 2017 – Gino Marinuzzi: Sinfonia in la/Suite Siciliana – conductor: Giuseppe Grazioli (Decca)
- 2018 – Jules Burgmein: La secchia rapita – Soloists & Choir of Civica Scuola di Musica C. Abbado – conductor: Aldo Salvagno (Dynamic)
- 2018 – Malipiero. Busoni – violin: Domenico Nordio, conductor: Tito Ceccherini (Sony)
- 2019 – Juan Diego Flórez. Verdi – Orchestra Sinfonica e Coro Sinfonico di Milano – tenor: Juan Diego Flórez, conductor: Jader Bignamini (Sony)
- 2020 – Italian Soundtracks – conductor: Giuseppe Grazioli (Warner Music)
- 2022 – Pinocchio & More – conductor: Giuseppe Grazioli (Warner Music)
- 2023 – Gustav Mahler: Symphonies Nos. 1, 3, 5, 7 & 9 – conductor: Claus Peter Flor (CD-Box Mahler Festival 2023)
- 2024 – Franco Alfano: Suite Romantica, Una Danza – conductor: Giuseppe Grazioli (Naxos)

== Record awards ==
- 2000 – Giuseppe Verdi: Heroines – conductor: Riccardo Chailly (Decca) – Gramophone Award, Classic FM People's Choice, Le Choc de l'Année
- 2006 – Shostakovich: Complete Symphonies – conductor: Oleg Caetani (Arts) – 10/10 Highest Rating – Classics Today, il ffff – Télérama awards
