= Dimcho Velichkov =

Bulgarian concert pianist

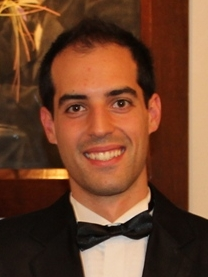
- Born: August 11, 1987 (age 39); Stara Zagora, Bulgaria
- Occupation: Concert pianist
- Years active: 2002-present

Dimcho Velichkov (born 11 August 1987 at Stara Zagora) is a Bulgarian concert pianist.

== Education ==
Velichkov started to play the piano when he was six. A year later he became a member of his father's piano class as a student in The National High School For Music, Dance and Theatre „Hristina Morfova“, Stara Zagora, graduating in 2005.

In 2005 he became a student at the University of Music and Performing Arts, Vienna, in the piano class of Franz Zettl. In 2011 he obtained a bachelor's degree in the piano class of Markus Prause. Other teachers were Igo Koch and Otto Probst. Velichkov has participated in the piano classes of Atanas Kurtev, Dimo Dimov, Ivaila Kirova, Krasimir Gatev and Aaron Short. In 2015 he obtained a master's degree.

== Musical career ==
In 2002 he played in „Hall Bulgaria“. One year later he was a soloist of the orchestra of The National State Opera, Stara Zagora. There he performed R. Shuman, piano concert in A-minor. He played as a soloist in Gap and Marseille as part of the international project „Young Musical Talents“ – Bulgaria and France.

He has performed concerts in Austria, Bulgaria, Canada, France, Hungary, Italy, Russia, Republic of Korea, Slovakia. He has taken part in the symphony orchestra "Blue jeans soloist Vienna“.

In 2013 he was invited by the Bulgarian Culture Institute and The Bulgarian Embassy in Moscow to perform as part of the celebrations of the capital of Russia. The same year he performed in Toronto, Canada. In the autumn of 2014 he played in Ulsan, Samchok, Yongul in The Republic of Korea.

Velichkov has played as a concert performer. He has also worked with other young performers including Klara Shuman (flute), Hristina Lazarova (soprano), Uljana Levit (soprano), Fulvio Bertosso, Ina Petkova (violoncello), Maiko Enomoto (violin) and Miho Yamamura (piano).

Since 2017 he works as a piano teacher at the Franz Schubert Conservatory - Vienna and at the Schmid & Zettelmann Private Music School.

=== Competitions and festivals ===
Velichkov has participated in various competitions and festivals including:

- „Stage of The Young Performer“ which was part of the Youth Festival for stage arts;
- Youth International Festival „Muses“ in Sozopol;
- „Korean World music Performing“;
- „Sofia Music Weeks“;
- „Apollonia“ – Sozopol;
- „Festival of Arts Boris Hristoff“.

== Awards ==
- First and Absolute award of the XIV international competition „Internazionale di Muzica Euterpe“, chairman of the jury was Marcello Abbado.
- Second award and silver medal from the XII international competition „Euterpe“, Corato, Italy, 2010;
- First award (composition) „A Play For a trumpet and a piano“;
- Second award and silver medal in the category „A Piano Duo“ from the Third National Competition „Classic and Modern times“;
- Third award from the second national competition „Vienna Classic“, 17th national competition „Svetoslav Obretenov“;
- A special award Young Talents from the 4th international competition „The Music and the Earth“.
