= Abbado (surname) =

Abbado is a surname. Notable people with the surname include:

- Claudio Abbado (1933–2014), Italian conductor, brother of Marcello
- Marcello Abbado (1926–2020), Italian pianist, composer, conductor, and teacher
- Roberto Abbado (born 1954), Italian conductor, son of Marcello
