= Genesis Suite =

Musical suite

Genesis Suite is a 1945 work for narrator, chorus and orchestra. A musical interpretation of the first eleven chapters of the Book of Genesis, the suite was a collaborative work by seven composers, some of whom wrote film music in Hollywood. The project was conceived by Nathaniel Shilkret, a noted conductor and composer of music for recording, radio and film. Shilkret wrote one of the seven pieces and invited the remaining composers to submit contributions as work-for-hire. Arnold Schoenberg and Igor Stravinsky wrote, respectively, the first and last parts. The Biblical text used in the spoken word narrative is the American King James Version. It was intended to be a crossover from art music to popular music.

== The Suite ==
	Title	Composer	Bible text	Timing - Angel	Timing - Naxos
I	"Prelude – Earth was without form "	Arnold Schoenberg		5:32	5:53
II	"Creation"	Nathaniel Shilkret	Genesis 1:1–12, 14–31, 2:1–3	9:29	11:07
III	"Adam and Eve"	Alexandre Tansman	Genesis 2:5–10, 15–25, 3:1–19	9:58	11:32
IV	"Cain and Abel"	Darius Milhaud	Genesis 4:1–16	5:03	4:46
V	"The Flood" ("Noah's Ark")	Mario Castelnuovo-Tedesco	Genesis 6:5–20, 7:1–4, 11, 18–19, 21–24, 8:1–13	9:37	11:03
VI	"The Covenant" ("The Rainbow")	Ernst Toch	Genesis 9:1–17	5:07	5:36
VII	"Babel"	Igor Stravinsky	Genesis 11:1–9	5:12	5:37

== Background ==
Shilkret conceived of the Genesis project while traveling with his friend Rex Schepp, perhaps around 1943. A letter from Nathaniel Shilkret to his son dated 9 February 1944 indicates that music for four of the parts had already been written (although not necessarily delivered to Shilkret) and that contractual matters with Stravinsky were holding up the writing of his part. A letter from Shilkret to Béla Bartók and a 24 July 1945 letter from Werner Janssen to Shilkret (see the commons for copies) indicates that Bartók had received a down payment for writing the "Prelude" and, as of July 1945, was preparing the work. According to Shilkret, Bartók did not do his task due to ill health, and Manuel de Falla and Richard Strauss had also been approached in connection with the project at some point, but declined. Paul Hindemith is described in the above referenced 9 February 1944 letter from Nathaniel Shilkret to his son as an alternate if Stravinsky declined.

Both Stravinsky and Schoenberg were short on money when they agreed to participate in the project.

In a personal letter dated 26 November 1945 from Nathaniel Shilkret to his wife (see the commons for a copy), Shilkret gives insight into his purpose in writing the piece and his thoughts on the resulting work:

"However, let me explain the original purpose of the Bible Album. It was never intended to be a work of musical art. If I prepared the Album for musicians I would not have done it with narrative, but like an oratorio—all singing—this would have put me in competition with Haydn's Creation—Bach—Handel etc. I would, even if I were successful musically, have sold about 500 Albums.”

"It would have been silly to have attempted such a work. My idea is strictly one for the masses—I wanted to appeal to all record buyers.”

"I admit that Schoenberg, Strawinsky, Milhaud and maybe Toch did the artistic job away from Hollywood influence, but my number received more applause [at the premiere performance] even from the concert audience. Tansman (not strictly a Hollywood composer), Tedesco (also not too Hollywoodish) and I did a more operatic style of scoring.”

"In fact, so successful was my score at the concert that we [Shilkret and Werner Janssen, who conducted the premiere concert performance and was shortly to conduct the premiere recording] are changing the order of the records. Instead of starting with Schoenberg and scaring the buyer, the album starts with Shilkret—Creation 2 sides... We leave the futuristic music of Strawinsky and Schoenberg for one double faced record and at the last.”

"The critics didn't dare to criticize the 2 giants Strawinsky and Schoenberg because they didn't understand them. Schoenberg's music is so ultramodern and in the 12 tone scale that even you with all your experience will think that the cat is just jumping all over the piano—It is a great piece of music but oh—so new in sound.”

"My appeal is to record buyers—not only music lovers of the ultra modern type but to all buyers and lovers of music and the bible.”

"If you think that Shilkret, Tedesco, Tansman and Toch wrote cheap music, you are mistaken—of course we used some dramatic tricks but you'll find them modern and beautiful—What is wrong in writing music to accentuate the scene or words—Wagner did it all the time. We do it in picture music because it is effective. For ordinary people even our music is strange and modern.”

== Performances and recordings ==
The premiere performance of the Genesis Suite was by the Janssen Symphony Orchestra of Los Angeles, Werner Janssen conducting, on 18 November 1945 at the Wilshire Ebell Theatre. The program, which includes the complete list of orchestra personnel for this performance, is reproduced in the archival edition of the Shilkret autobiography.

An anecdotal event related to the premiere performance is that the rehearsal the day before the concert is one of only two times that Schoenberg and Stravinsky, whose mutual dislike for each other is well-known, were together. Shilkret gives details of how his plans to keep them separated went awry.

The premiere recording, on 11 December 1945 of the orchestral track was also by Janssen conducting his orchestra, and a separate track was made for the choral part directed by Hugo Strelitzer. A track with narration by character actor Edward Arnold was made circa June 1946. Shilkret and Janssen made these recordings at their own expense, with Janssen expecting that RCA Victor would publish the recordings, but RCA exercised its option to decline. An offer from Capitol Records was turned down. Janssen, together with some businessmen friends, had formed Artist Records record company, and the Genesis recording, with the three tracks merged, was issued under the Artist label as Album JS-10. As Shilkret had indicated in the letter cited above, the Schoenberg piece was renamed "Postlude" and was the last piece in the album.

The "Weekly Feature Concert—New Recordings” program of Los Angeles radio station KFAC played the recording of the Genesis Suite on 7 February 1947. A KFAC flyer with their 5–7 February 1947 programming and a note from Janssen to Shilkret indicating that the suite was played in its entirety are reproduced in the archival edition of the Shilkret autobiography.

The Utah Symphony Orchestra, conducted by Janssen, with narration again by Arnold, performed the Genesis Suite on 9 February 1947 in the Tabernacle in Salt Lake City. Press reviews of the concert and correspondence from Janssen to Shilkret regarding the performance are reproduced in the archival edition of the Shilkret autobiography.

Janssen conducted the Portland Symphony Orchestra and the Portland Symphonic Choir, again with narration by Arnold, circa December 1947. Press reviews and relevant correspondence from Janssen to Shilkret are reproduced in the archival edition of the Shilkret autobiography.

Problems with Artist Record company led Janssen and Shilkret to stop sales by Artist and destroy existing stock in order for Capitol Records to issue the Genesis Suite as Album P8125 and P8125Y-Z. Schoenberg's contribution was restored to its first position and a new narration track was dubbed circa December 1950. A 1951 royalty statement in the Shilkret archives notes “Advances: One-half of $500.00 fee paid to Ted Osborne for narration.” This album was reissued in 2001 in CD format as Angel Records 67729.

A completely new recording of the Genesis Suite was made in December 2000 at Jesus-Christus-Kirche in Berlin by the Rundfunk-Sinfonieorchester Berlin, conducted by Gerard Schwarz and featuring the Ernst Senff Chor. The narration was by acting stars Tovah Feldshuh, Barbara Feldon, David Margulies, Fritz Weaver, and writer Isaiah Sheffer. The recordings were made from recreated scores. The liner notes state that the only copies of five of the scores were destroyed in a fire in Nathaniel Shilkret's home in the 1960s. There was a fire in his son Arthur Shilkret's store at 55 Church Street, Malverne, New York on 26 October 1973 (documented in the 1 November 1973 Malverne Times, a copy of which is reproduced in the archival edition of the Shilkret autobiography). However, full scores prepared by Shilkret of all seven parts are still in the Shilkret archives as well as Castelnuevo-Tedesco's original signed submitted score, dated 11 March 1944.

The Genesis Suite was performed by the Seattle Symphony Orchestra, conducted by Gerard Schwarz, accompanied by the University of Washington Chorale, with narrative by F. Murray Abraham and Patty Duke on 29 and 31 May 2008.

The Genesis Suite was performed for the first time in the UK by the London Symphony Orchestra under the direction of Simon Rattle in 2018.
