= Marcelle de Lacour =

French teacher

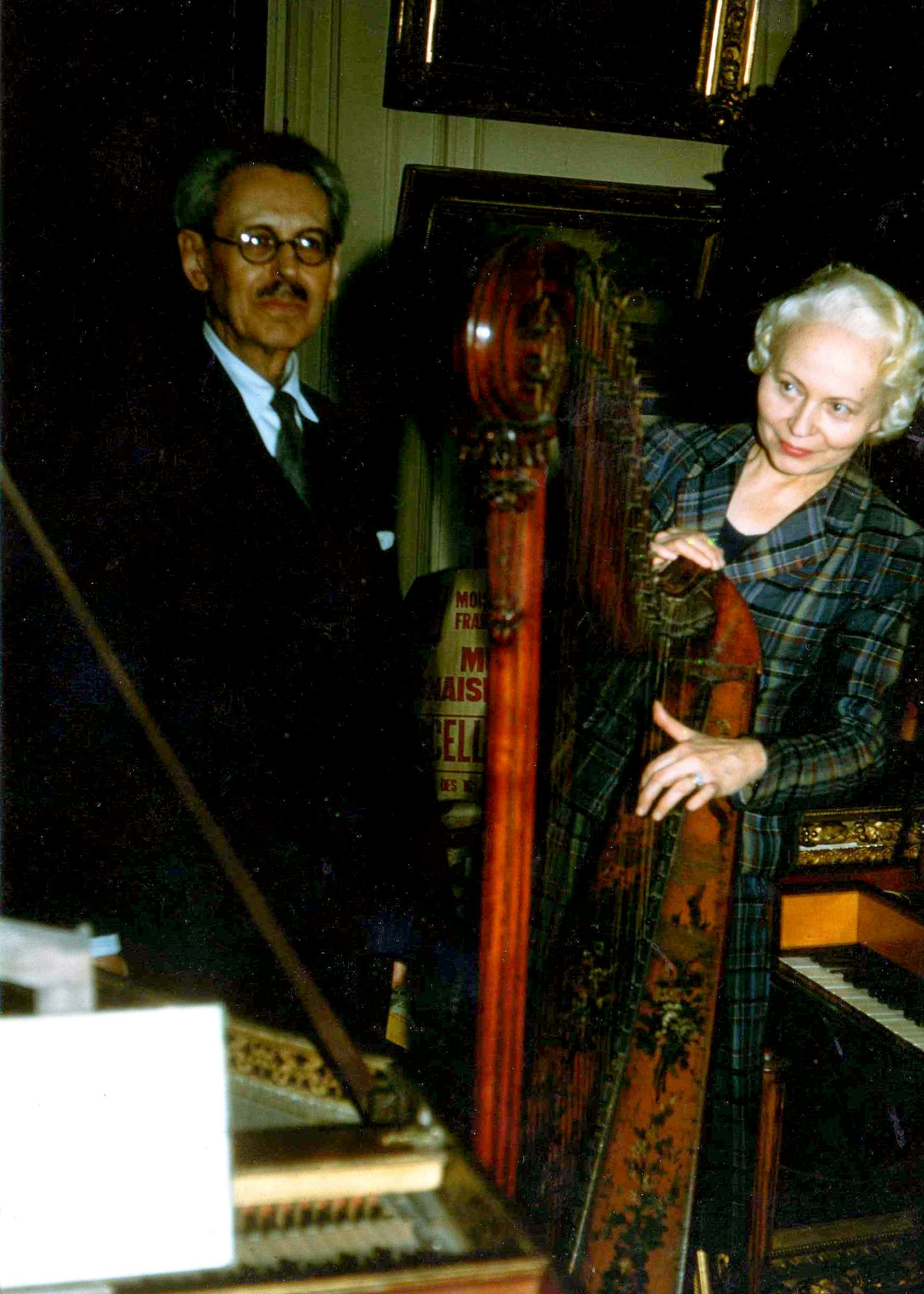
- Robert and Marcelle de Lacour
- Born: Marcelle Schaeffer; 6 November 1896; Besançon, France
- Died: 24 March 1997 (aged 100); Paris, France
- Occupations: Harpsichordist, teacher

Marcelle de Lacour, née Schaeffer (6 November 1896 – 24 March 1997), was a French harpsichordist and teacher.

== Early life ==
De Lacour was born in Besançon, France, the capital of the department of Doubs. Her father came from Alsace-Lorraine and her mother from the Franche-Comté. She married the lawyer and amateur musician Robert de Lacour and settled in Paris in the middle of the 1920s. There she studied with Wanda Landowska.

== Career ==
By the time of the outbreak of the Second World War she had given numerous recitals in France, Great Britain and other European countries. Her repertoire as soloist, either with small groups of musicians or large orchestras, encompassed the music of the Baroque and Classical periods (Loeillet, Bodin de Boismortier, Lalande, Lully, Charpentier, Couperin, Rameau, Purcell, Pachelbel, Bach, Schütz, Buxtehude, Scarlatti, Handel, Telemann). She also gave recitals of contemporary compositions by composers, including Bohuslav Martinů, Herbert Murrill, Florent Schmitt, Alexandre Tansman, and Francis Poulenc, who dedicated several works to her.

After 1945 she performed with the Paris Philharmonic Orchestra and the Orchestre National de France as well as with the oboist Pierre Pierlot, the Pasquier Trio and the flautist Jean-Pierre Rampal. On radio she created the programme Les tournois du royaume de la musique [Tournaments through the realm of Music], a music competition for young artists, and also took part in the Analyse spectrale de l'Occident [Spectral Analysis of the West], a series on Western culture instigated by the composer Henry Barraud. She also made several recordings with His Master's Voice, Pathé, and L'Oiseau Lyre.

She was professor of harpsichord at the Conservatoire de Paris, creating the class in 1955 and teaching until her retirement in September 1967. Her classes included students from Bulgaria, China, Germany, the Netherlands, and the United States. She lived her final years in Paris and died in 1997, aged 100.
