= Arsène Alexandre =

French art critic (1859–1937)

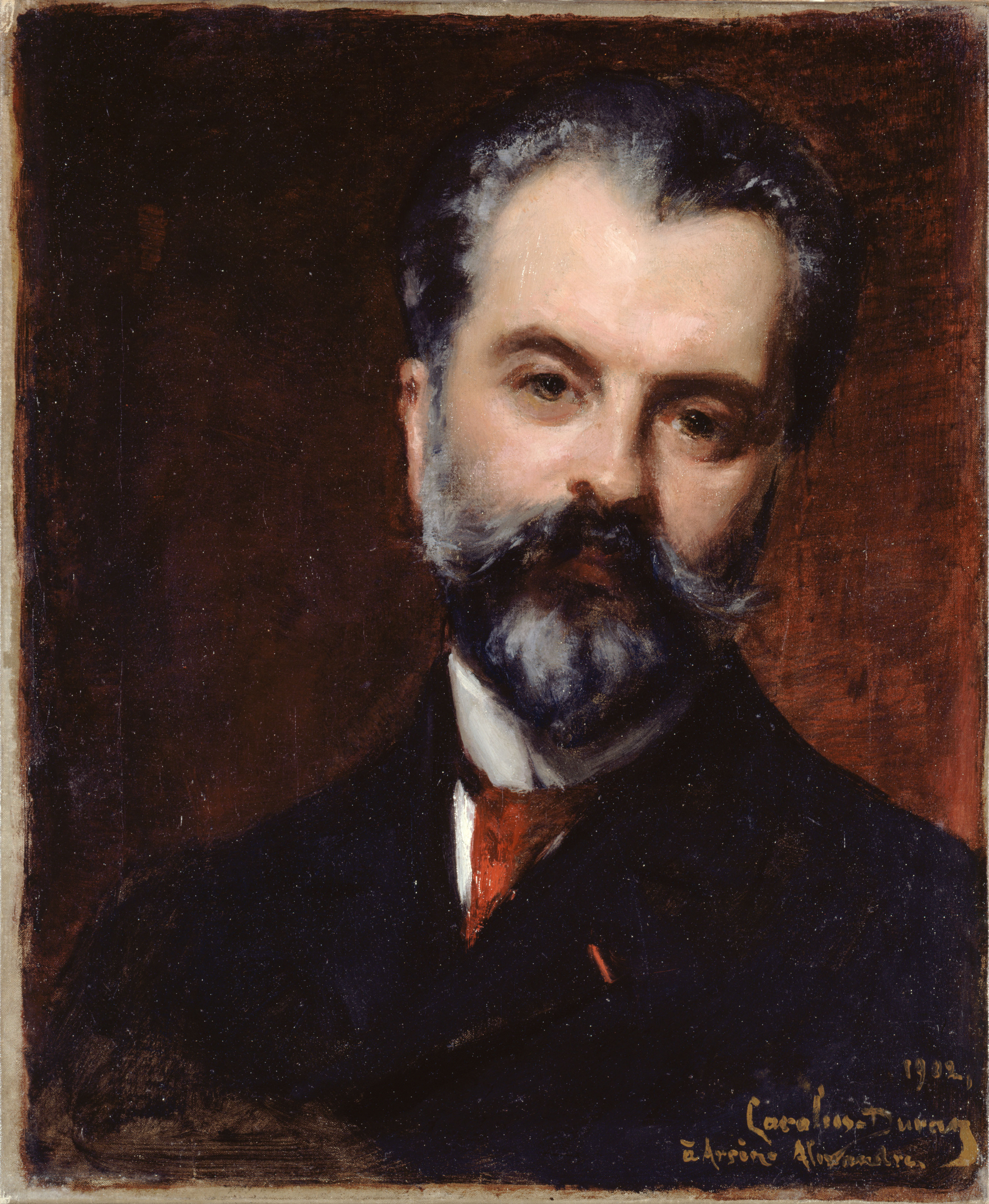
- Arsène Alexandre by Carolus-Duran.
- Born: 16 August 1859; Paris, France
- Died: 1 October 1937 (aged 78); Brain sur Allonnes, France
- Occupation: Art critic
- Writing career
- Notable works: Honoré Daumier, l'homme et l'œuvre

Arsène Alexandre (16 August 1859 – 1 October 1937) was a French art critic.

He was a contributor to L'Événement, Le Paris and L'Éclair and in 1894 was one of the founders of the satirical journal Le Rire, becoming its artistic director. He was later art critic for Le Figaro. Alexandre and Félix Fénéon were the first to use the term 'pointillism', in 1886, and Alexandre alone coined the term 'the Rouen School', in 1902 in a catalogue to an exhibition of the work of Joseph Delattre at the galerie Durand-Ruel à Paris. He also wrote several articles for Le Théâtre, notably 'Le Théâtre au Salon' in June 1898 and several theatre reviews.

He was Inspecteur Général des Musées during the First World War.

== Works ==
- Honoré Daumier, l'homme et l'œuvre, H. Laurens, Paris, 1888
- Oeuvre d'Alphonse de Neuville, A. Lahure, 1889
- A. L. Barye, Librairie de l'Art, 1889
- Histoire de l'art décoratif du XVIe siècle à nos jours, H. Laurens, 1892
- L'Art du rire et de la caricature, Librairie-imprimerie réuies, 1892
- La Sœur de Pierrot, novel, illustrations de A. Willette, Librairie Delagrave, 1893
- Histoire populaire de la peinture, H. Laurens, 1895
- Jean Carriès, imagier et potier: étude d'une œuvre et d'une vie, Librairies-imprimeries réunies, Paris, 1895
- Le Balzac de Rodin, H. Floury Éditeur, Paris, 1898
- A. F. Cals ou le bonheur de peindre, G. Petit, 1900
- Les Reines de l'aiguille: modistes et couturières, étude parisienne, T. Belin, 1902
- Ignacio Zuloaga, Manzi-Joyant, 1903
- La maison de Victor Hugo. Editions Hachette, 1903
- Auguste Rodin, Manzi-Joyant, 1904
- Donatello, H. Laurens, Paris, 1904
- Jean-François Raffaelli, peintre, graveur et sculpteur, H. Floury, Paris, 1909
- La Collection Henri Rouart, Goupil & Cie, Imprimeurs-éditeurs. Limited edition, 1912
- L'Art décoratif de Léon Bakst, M. de Brunoff, Paris, 1913
- Vladimir de Terlikowski Peintre, éditions Alcan, Paris, 1927
- Louise C. Breslau, Rieder, Paris, 1928
- Botticelli, Rieder, Paris, 1929
- Frank Boggs, Le Goupy, Paris, 1929
- Paul Gauguin : sa vie et le sens de son œuvre, Bernheim-Jeune, Paris, 1930
- Emile Friant et son oeuvre, Etablissement Braun & Cie, Mulhouse-Dornach (Haut-Rhin), no date (1931?), 48 p., 62 pl.
- Vermeer et l'école de Delft, 1933
- La Vie et l'Œuvre de Charles Pinet, graveur (1867–1932), Protat frères, Mâcon, 1934
- Les Années de captivité de Beethoven (1819–1827), F. Alcan, Paris, 1936
