= Herbert Murrill =

British composer and organist (1909-1952)

- Born: Herbert Henry John Murrill; 11 May 1909; London, England
- Died: 25 July 1952 (aged 43); London, England
- Education: Haberdashers' Aske's Hampstead School; Royal Academy of Music; University of Oxford
- Occupations: Organist; composer
- Spouses: Alice Margaret Good (m. 1933; div. 1940); Vera Canning (m. 1941)
- Children: 1

Herbert Henry John Murrill (11 May 1909 – 25 July 1952) was an English musician, composer, and organist.

== Education and early career ==
Herbert Henry John (later just Herbert) Murrill was born in London, at 19, Fircroft Road in Upper Tooting, the eldest of three children. He lived with his family in South London, where his father Walter was a cork merchant. As a young man, he had a group of musical friends who encouraged and supported him. He was a chorister and a scholarship student at Haberdashers' Aske's Hatcham School from 1920 to 1925.

He was awarded a scholarship to the Guildhall School of Music, but in 1925 went instead to the Royal Academy of Music, where he studied with York Bowen (piano), Alan Bush (harmony) and Stanley Marchant (organ and choir training). He remained there until 1928, winning medals for piano, organ, harmony and aural training, while at the same time serving as the organist of St Nicholas Church in Chiswick. His first works date from this era, including the Rhapsody for cello and piano and the ballet Picnic from 1927. Ralph Vaughan Williams heard the ballet's performance at the Crouch Festival and liked the work; he subsequently became a friend of Murrill's. He then became an organ scholar at Worcester College, Oxford, from 1928 to 1931, studying with William Harris, Ernest Walker and Hugh Allen.

== 1930s and wartime ==
After graduating he organised a recital of his own music (shared with Brian Easdale) at the Wigmore Hall in London on 1 July 1931. In 1933 he was appointed Professor of Composition at the Royal Academy of Music in 1933. The same year he married the concert pianist Alice Margaret Good (1906–2000). They subsequently divorced and she married William Pleeth in 1942. He was for a time in the 1930s organist of Christ Church, Lancaster Gate, London and St Thomas' Church, Regent Street (now demolished). He also acted as musical director of The Group Theatre, where he worked with W. H. Auden and Benjamin Britten, conducting the music Britten composed for Timon of Athens in 1935.

Murrill's second wife was the cellist Vera Canning, whom he married in 1941. They lived at Blunham Rectory in Bedfordshire. There was a daughter, Carolyn Jane Murrill (1942–2008). Between 1942 and 1946 he joined the Intelligence Corps as a Sergeant at Bletchley Park. While there he conducted the Bletchley Park Musical Society in performances of Purcell's Dido and Aeneas and persuaded top class musicians to visit and perform, including Peter Pears and Myra Hess.

== Post war and the BBC ==
Murrill's primary musical role from 1936 onwards (interrupted by the war) was working for the BBC, first as assistant to Victor Hely-Hutchinson and then to Steuart Wilson, whom he finally succeeded as Head of Music in 1950. During his brief tenure as head he clashed with the conductor Malcolm Sargent. Sargent's biographer Richard Aldous portrays Murrill as an archetypal BBC Music Department insider of that period: "home to the dispossessed of English musical life, a place where frustrated composers and academics...licked their wounds and passed judgement over their more successful contemporaries". Alan Frank disagreed, calling him "an outstanding success" at the BBC as well as "a skilled organist and pianist, a stimulating teacher [and] a composer of considerable charm".

Towards the end of 1951 Murrill was diagnosed with cancer, and had left his post at the BBC by Christmas. He died in London and was cremated at Marylebone Crematorium on 29 July 1952.

== Musical works ==
Murrill's affinities were Francophile (Ravel) and mildly middle-Stravinskian, both influences tempered by an English take on neo-classicism. The early works include the jazz opera Man in Cage (1930), which ran for eight weeks at the Grafton Theatre in London while he was still at university. He wrote film scores for And So to Work (1936) and The Daily Round (1937), short educational films directed by Richard Massingham, as well as incidental music for two plays by W. H. Auden, The Dance of Death and, also by Christopher Isherwood, The Dog Beneath the Skin. In October 1937 he and his first wife Alice Good were at Alexandra Palace playing two pianos to accompany the live television revue Full Moon, written by Archie Harradine and produced by Eric Crozier, with music by Murrill.

The orchestral Three Hornpipes (1934) were performed several times at the BBC Proms, and are reminiscent of William Walton's Portsmouth Point, while the 1945 Country Dances for string orchestra show the influence of Peter Warlock's Capriol Suite. But Murrill's personal voice comes over most clearly in the second of his two cello concertos, subtitled The Song of the Birds (1951). Written for and dedicated to Pablo Casals it quotes the popular Catalan song of the same name and has been called his "masterpiece". His second wife Vera Canning gave the first performance in 1951. The score of an unfinished Violin Concerto, dating from 1952, is among his manuscripts.

Of the chamber music, the String Quartet of 1939 is the most notable example. It was dedicated to the Leighton Quartet, whose cellist was Vera Canning. Vaughan Williams thought it "full of invention and imagination without extravagance". Murrill requested in his will that the quartet's slow movement, marked con intensita, be played at his funeral. He also wrote vocal works (such as the madrigal Love Not Me for Comely Grace and the Two Songs from Twelfth Night, dedicated to the memory of Peter Warlock). First recordings of many of his songs were issued by First Hand Records in 2025.

For the keyboard (Murrill's instrument) there are the two piano Impromptus of 1933, paying homage to Chopin and Poulenc respectively, the Suite Française (1938) for harpsichord or piano, which was dedicated to Marcelle de Lacour, and three concert pieces for piano, Toccatina, Canzona and Presto Alla Giga. He made a popular arrangement for piano duet (or organ) of the orchestral march Crown Imperial by William Walton. His piano duet arrangement of Walton's First Symphony was published by Oxford University Press. However, his most frequently performed works now are his choral and organ works written for the church: his setting of the Magnificat and Nunc dimittis in E major (published in 1947), a Double Chant in G used in the Baptist Hymn Book (1962), the hymn tune "Carolyn" (1951), and an organ piece called "Carillon".

Murrill was also responsible for the official, martial orchestral version of the Indian national anthem, approved by Jawaharlal Nehru before independence in 1947.

== Sources ==
- Murrill, Herbert (September 1989). Murrill, Carolyn (ed.). Five Songs. Heritage of English Song. Vol. 9. London: Thames Publishing.
