= Meir Minsky =

American, Israeli, and Belgian conductor (born 1949)

Meir Minsky (born 16 April 1949) is an American, Israeli, and Belgian conductor. A frequent guest among leading orchestras he has performed with more than one hundred different orchestras worldwide, including the Munich Philharmonic, the Israel Philharmonic, Orchestre National de France, Bavarian Radio Symphony Orchestra, orchestras in Tokyo, Chicago, Paris, Milan, Rome, Madrid, Barcelona, Berlin, Bonn, Frankfurt, Stuttgart, Basel, Bern, Amsterdam, Warsaw, Jerusalem, Budapest, Bucharest and Brussels. He has conducted from a wide-ranging repertoire, which includes over five hundred entries of music, and specializes in the late romantic, German and Central European, repertoire of the 19th and early 20th centuries.

== Biography ==
Born in Łódź, Poland, Meir Minsky was a few months old when his family immigrated to Israel. He is a graduate of the Jerusalem Academy of Music and Dance in conducting and composition, and in 1977 was awarded a diploma from the Accademia di Santa Cecilia in Rome after graduating from Maestro Franco Ferrara's prestigious Corso di Perfezionamento. He participated in conducting master classes at the festivals of Siena and Ravello, at Teatro La Fenice in Venice and at the Hochschule fur Musik in Cologne. Mr. Minsky has won prizes and awards from the Florence international conducting competition, the Accademia di Santa Cecila, the American Israeli Cultural Foundation and the Ravello festival.

== Recordings ==
Mr. Minsky has recorded music by Joseph Joachim and Alexandre Tansman for Marco Polo label of NAXOS, music by Daniel Sternefeld for Phaedra, Joly Braga Santos among other Portuguese Music for KOCH Schwann, and the labels DIVOX, Leonardo, and Ritzen Editions.
