= Stefan Frenkel =

Polish-born American composer

Stefan Frenkel (21 November 1902 – 1 March 1979), born in Warsaw and in later years resident in America, was a violinist, academic and composer.

== Life ==
Frenkel was born in Warsaw in 1902, a son of businessman Adam Frenkel and wife Berta. At the Hochschule für Musik in Berlin he studied violin with Adolf Busch and Carl Flesch, and composition with Friedrich Koch. He became concertmaster of the Dresden Philharmonic in 1924.

At this time he also gave concerts as soloist and in chamber music, and performed contemporary music in the series of concerts organized by the pianist Paul Aron, the "Neue Musik Paul Aron". He gave the premieres of Josef Suk's "Phantasie" for violin and orchestra, and of Kurt Weill's concerto for violin and wind orchestra. He left Dresden in 1926, and appeared as soloist at venues in Germany, playing works by contemporary composers, including the premiere in 1929 of his own concerto for violin and string orchestra.

From 1933, in Nazi Germany, Frenkel could perform only in events organized by the Jüdische Kulturbund. He left Germany in 1935 and moved to Switzerland, where he was concertmaster of the Orchestre de la Suisse Romande. In the following year he moved to the United States, and in New York was the first concertmaster of the Metropolitan Opera, holding the post until 1940.

He was a violin teacher at Princeton University, and during summers he was concertmaster at Rio de Janeiro Opera and Santa Fe Opera.

Frenkel died in 1979 at his home in Forest Hills, Queens, New York. He was survived by his wife Lotte, children Sonja and Thomas, and a granddaughter.
