= Marcello Abbado =

Italian composer (1928–2022)

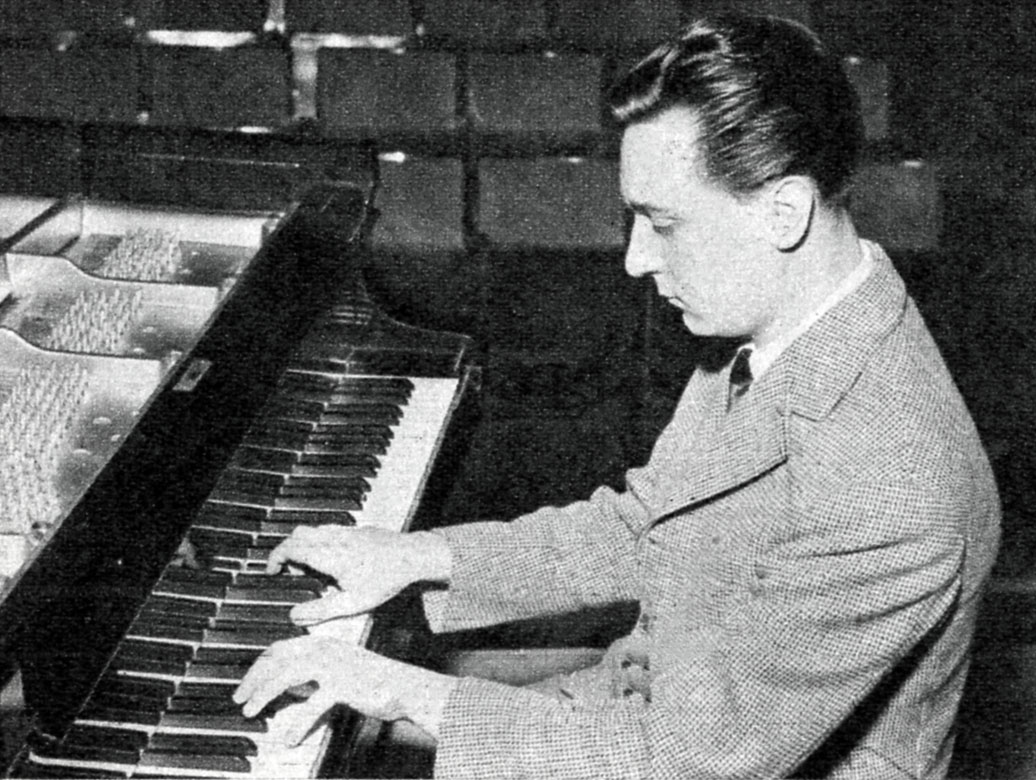
- Abbado in 1959
- Born: 7 October 1926; Milan, Italy
- Died: 4 June 2020 (aged 93); Stresa, Italy
- Education: Giuseppe Verdi Conservatory
- Occupations: Classical pianist; Composer; Conductor; Academic teacher
- Organizations: Conservatory of Bologna; Giuseppe Verdi Conservatory; Symphonic Orchestra of Milan "Giuseppe Verdi"
- Relatives: Claudio Abbado (brother); Roberto Abbado (son)

Marcello Abbado (7 October 1926 – 4 June 2020) was an Italian pianist, composer, conductor and academic teacher. His compositions include several orchestral works, two ballets, numerous pieces for solo piano, and chamber music. As a pianist, he played in major concert halls of the world. He taught composition at several conservatories, ultimately at the Giuseppe Verdi Conservatory. In 1989 he was awarded the gold medal for Meritorious Culture and Art (Medaglia d'oro ai benemeriti della cultura e dell'arte) by the Government of Italy.

== Early life and education ==
Born in Milan into a family of famous musicians, he was the son of guitarrist Michelangelo Abbado, brother of conductor Claudio Abbado, and father of conductor Roberto Abbado and digital artist Adriano Abbado. He studied piano at the Giuseppe Verdi Conservatory with Gianandrea Gavazzeni and Renzo Lorenzoni, graduating in 1944. He further studied composition with Giulio Cesare Paribèni and Giorgio Federico Ghedini, earning the diploma in 1947.

== Career ==
As a pianist, his repertoire included Mozart's 27 piano concertos, played with the Vienna Philharmonic, and Debussy's entire piano works. He also performed keyboard music by J. S. Bach and Alessandro Scarlatti, and piano concertos, including those by Tchaikovsky and Prokofiev and Ravel's Concerto for the Left Hand. He performed in the major halls of Beijing, Budapest, Buenos Aires, London, Milan, Montreal, Moscow, New York, Paris, Rome, Tokyo and Vienna.

In addition to his concert activity, Abbado was also a teacher of musical composition at the Conservatory of Bologna for twelve years, and also taught at the Parma Conservatory. He later taught and served as the director of the Giuseppe Nicolini Conservatory in Piacenza (1958 to 1966), at the Conservatory "Gioacchino Rossini" in Pesaro (1966 to 1972) and finally at the Giuseppe Verdi Conservatory in Milan (1972 to 1996). He was also a member of the board at the Teatro alla Scala for twenty-four years. In 1993, together with Vladimir Delman, he formed the Symphonic Orchestra of Milan "Giuseppe Verdi", of which he was the artistic director from 1993 to 1996. He also taught masterclasses in Asia, Europe and the United States.

His numerous compositions have been published by leading Italian publishers, including Carish, Curci, Ricordi and Suvini Zerboni. Programs dedicated exclusively to his music have been performed in Japan, Russia and the United States.

Abbado was the president and a jury member of international music competitions, including the Beethoven Competition in Vienna, Bösendorfer in Brussels, Maria Canals International Music Competition in Barcelona, Ciani in Milan, Min-On in Tokyo, Obraztosva in Saint Petersburg, Rubinstein in Tel Aviv, and Van Cliburn International Piano Competition in Fort Worth, Ettore Pozzoli International Piano Competition in Seregno, among many others.

== Death ==
Abbado died in Stresa at age 93.

== Compositions ==
Abbado's compositions include ballets, vocal music for choirs and solo voices, orchestral works and chamber music, often including the piano:

- Ciapo for voice and nine instruments
- Duo for violin and cello (1952)
- Scena senza storia, ballet (1954)
- 15 Poesie T'ang for voice, flute, oboe, cello and piano (1959)
- Ostinato sopra un ritmo dalla Sinfonia del Signor Bruschino di Rossini for piano, strings and percussion (1994)
- Sette Ricercari e Sei Intermezzi for violin and orchestra (1996)
- L'idea fissa for violin, choir and thirteen voices (1996)
- Musica celeste (1997)
- Dieci canti popolari siciliani for violin, voice and orchestra (1997)
- Le campane di Mosca for violin and percussion (1998)
- Hawaii 2000
- Lento e Rondò for violin and percussion orchestra (2000)
- Costruzione for twelve cellos (2001)
- Variazioni sopra un tema di Mozart for orchestra (2001)
- Nuova Costruzione for eight woodwinds (2002)
- Concerto per flauto e orchestra (2002)
- Australia for violin, didgeridoo, piano and percussion (2002)
- Asif, Saleem, Nasreen for violin, viola, cello and strings (2002)
- Risonanza magnetica for piano and percussion (2003)
- Stage music for La voix humaine by Jean Cocteau (2003)
- Il buio negli occhi (2003)
- La strage degli innocenti, cantata for solo voice, boys' choir, mixed choir and orchestra
- Concerto for orchestra
- Hommage à C. Debussy for orchestra
- Doppio concerto for violin, piano and double chamber orchestra
- Quadruplo concerto for piano, violin, viola, cello and orchestra
- Concerto for harp and string quartet (2003-2004)
- Concerto per carillon e orchestra (2005)
- Tankstream, for string quartet (2005)
- Fantasia russa for violin and string quartet (2005)
- Sinfonia degli arrivi (2006)
- Carillon su Joyce Yang for piano and percussion (2006)
- Quattro Viola Fantasie for oboe, trumpet, piano and vibraphone (2006)
- Kazach Fantasy for violin and orchestra Kazach (2006)
- Bali for violin and Indonesian gamelan (2006)
- Costruzioni... e Ricostruzioni 2007
- Mondrian trio, piano trio (2007)
- Carillon on Min-On for piano four-hands (2008)
- Van Cliburn Concerto for four pianos and orchestra (2008)
- Java for percussion (2008)
- Concerto for four violins and strings (2008)
- Dialogo a due voci for the left hand (2009)
- Per due orchestre (2009)
- Gloria per Gloria for soprano, choir and orchestra (2009)
- Stagioni for violin and reciter (2009)
- Alicante for sixteen horns, sixteen trumpets, and sixteen trombones (2010)
- Sogno for orchestra (2010)
- Asia for percussion, voice recordings and Asian instruments (2010)
- Dialogo for harp and trumpet (2011)
- Sitkovetsky Wu for violin and piano (2011)
- Marlaena Kessick for flute orchestra (2011)
- Fantasia for cello (2011)
- Trio for piano, singer, and dancer (2012)
- Fantasia ungherese for flute (2012)
- Trio for violin, cello and double bass (2012)
- Ceneri for piano (2012)
- Così non fan tutte for orchestra (2013)
- Tastiera sola for piano (2013)
- Fibonacci for piano (2013)
- Alhambra for orchestra
- Aus dem klavier for piano
- Chaconne for violin
- Costruzioni for 5 piccole orchestre
- Divertimento for four woodwinds and piano
- Doppio concerto for violin, piano and double chamber orchestra
- Lamento per la morte della madre for piano
- Musica for orchestra
- Quartetto n. 1, n. 2 and n. 3, string quartets
- Riverberazioni for flute, oboe, bassoon and piano
