= Vladimir de Terlikowski =

Polish painter (1873–1951)

Wladimir de Terlikowski or Włodzimierz Terlikowski (1873–1951) was a Polish painter mainly active in France.

== Life ==
Born to a noble family near Warsaw, he discovered art on several trips to France, Italy, Spain, Germany, Switzerland and North Africa. After short periods studying in the academy of fine arts in Munich and the Parisian studio of Jean-Paul Laurens, Terlikowski's first works were close to Fauvism and got him noticed by the galerie Galerie Bernheim-Jeune. Terlikowski set up a studio in Montparnasse, where he was a contemporary of Modigliani, Soutine, Picasso, Derain and Vlaminck.

== Exhibitions ==
- Exposition Władimir de Terlikowski (21 April – 3 May 1913), Chez MM Bernheim-Jeune
- L'art polonais en France, paysages du Morbihan (20 November – 2 December 1916), Chez MM Bernheim-Jeune
- Exposition W. de Terlikowski: Venise, Paris, Provence - Hotel Charpentier - 21 April – 19 May 1927
- Wladimir de Terlikowski: May–June 1981, Troyes, Centre culturel Thibaud de Champagne
- Wladimir de Terlikowski: June–October 2002, Musée des Peintres de l'Ecole de Murol - 63 Murol
- Wladimir de Terlikowski: February 2012, Bibliothèque Polonaise de Paris - 75004 Paris

== Museums exhibiting his works ==
- Musée National d'Art Moderne - Centre national d'art et de culture Georges-Pompidou
- Musée des beaux-arts de Bordeaux
- Musée des beaux-arts de Troyes
- Musée de Murol

== Bibliography ==
- Arsène Alexandre, W. de Terlikowski Peintre, éditions Alcan, Paris, 1927
- Jan-Topass, "W de Terlikowski" Editions "Le Triangle" Paris 1930
- Arsène Alexandre "Terlikowski" Peintre de Figures, copyright by A. Alexandre, 1934
- Wladimir de Terlikowski: his life and art, Par Bennard B. Perlman, Martha Walker Fullington, éditions W. Vance Brown II, 1998
