= Oleg Caetani =

Italian conductor

Oleg Caetani (born 5 October 1956) is an Italian conductor.

== Life and career ==
Born in Lausanne, Caetani is the son of Igor Markevitch (1912-1983) and Donna Topazia Caetani (1921–1990), Markevitch's second wife and a descendant of a very old aristocratic Roman family that included the early 14th-century Pope Boniface VIII. Caetani has chosen to use his mother's family name to continue its lineage. Caetani was a pupil of Nadia Boulanger. At the Conservatory of Santa Cecilia in Rome, he studied conducting with Franco Ferrara and composition with Irma Ravinale. He made his debut at age 17 with a production of Claudio Monteverdi's Il combattimento di Tancredi e Clorinda. He then attended the Moscow Conservatory to study conducting with Kirill Kondrashin and musicology with Nadezhda Nikolaeva. He graduated from the St Petersburg Conservatory in conducting with Ilya Musin.

Caetani won the RAI Competition in 1979 and the third prize at the Karajan Competition in Berlin in 1982. He started his professional career at the Staatsoper Unter den Linden in Berlin. He was then Chief Conductor at the Nationaltheater Weimar, First Kapelllmeister at the Frankfurt Opera, Music Director first at the Hessisches Staatstheater Wiesbaden, later at the Chemnitz Opera and Robert Schumann Philharmonic Orchestra.

In 2001 Caetani conducted at La Scala, Milan Turandot and Otello in 2005. His first conducting appearance with English National Opera (ENO) was in 2003 with Khovanshchina, then he was Chief Designate in 2005 and came back for Sir John in Love in 2006. His first conducting appearance with English National Opera (ENO) was in 2003 with Khovanshchina. In February 2005, ENO announced the appointment of Caetani as its music director, effective in 2006. However, after the November 2005 resignation of ENO's then-artistic director, Sean Doran, who had appointed Caetani, Caetani's own appointment as the next ENO Music Director was cancelled in December 2005, the month before he was scheduled to take up the post. Concerns had arisen that Caetani's commitments in Australia limited his available time to serve with ENO. Even though Caetani never formally took up the post of ENO's music director, he fulfilled his contract to conduct ENO's 2006 production of Sir John in Love (the first fully staged revival since 1958).

Caetani made his Australian conducting debut in 2001 with the Melbourne Symphony Orchestra (MSO). In January 2005, he became the MSO's chief conductor and artistic director. In 2007 he led the MSO on its second European tour, which took in performances in major centres including Berlin, Madrid, Milan and Paris (the first time that an Australian orchestra played in those European capitals). In March 2008, the MSO announced the extension of Caetani's contract through to the end of 2010. He led the MSO in the Australian premieres of Brahms' Serenade No. 1, works by Enescu, Bartók, Schoenberg, Walton, Ravel, and Shostakovich's Symphonies No. 2 and No. 13 (Babi Yar) on 7 August 2008. His recording projects with the MSO included all the symphonies of Alexandre Tansman and the orchestral works of Rudi Stephan. In 2009, Caetani's contract was ended one year early after disagreements with the MSO management.

Caetani's recordings include the first complete cycle of the Shostakovich symphonies recorded by an Italian orchestra, with the Orchestra Sinfonica di Milano Giuseppe Verdi, Poliuto by Donizetti with Carreras, Ricciarelli and the Wiener Symphoniker, the symphonic cycles by Tchaikovsky and Gounod (Diapason d'or ), a CD with Wagner overtures and another one with various Mendelssohn works. He has been a regular guest at the Mariinsky Theatre, where he has conducted the Russian Premiere of The Prisoner by Dallapiccola at the White Night Festival in 2015. Caetani received the Berlioz medal for his interpretation of Benvenuto Cellini and the Romanian Legion of Honour for culture merite because of his work to increase Enesco's popularity outside Romania.

Cultural offices
Preceded by John Carewe	Generalmusikdirektor, Theater Chemnitz; 1996–2001	Succeeded by Nikša Bareza
