= Israel Yinon =

Israeli conductor

- ישראל ינון
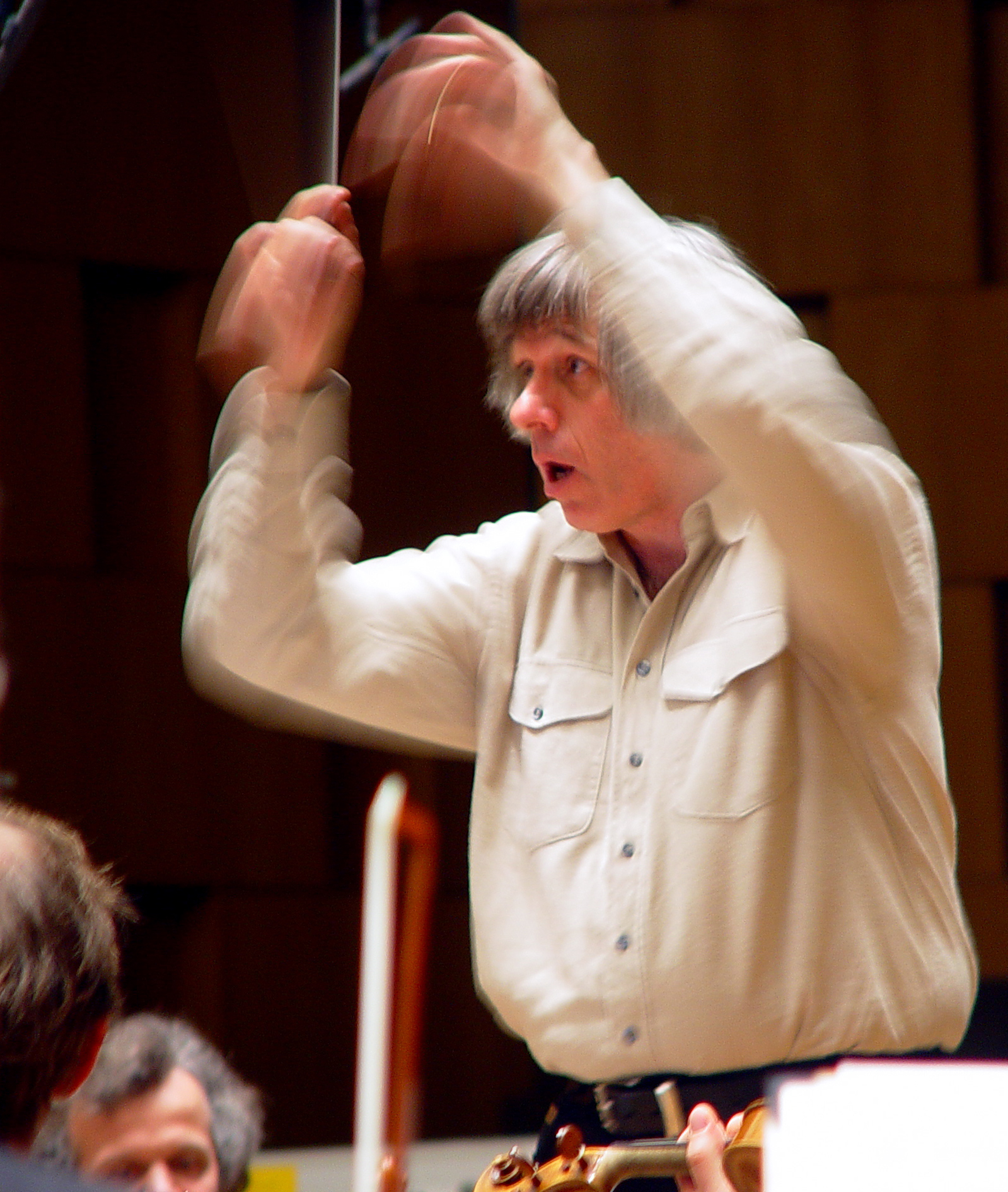
- Yinon during rehearsals in 2003
- Born: 11 January 1956; Kfar Saba, Israel
- Died: 29 January 2015 (aged 59); Lucerne, Switzerland
- Occupation: Conductor

Israel Yinon (Hebrew: ישראל ינון; 11 January 1956 – 29 January 2015) was an Israeli conductor. He was a guest conductor with numerous orchestras around the world, including the Royal Philharmonic and the Vienna Symphony. He specialized in reviving works of forgotten German composers who were forbidden under Adolf Hitler.

Yinon died after collapsing on stage during a youth concert at the Lucerne University of Applied Sciences and Arts in Switzerland. He was 59.
