= Vladimir Delman =

Russian conductor (1923–1994)

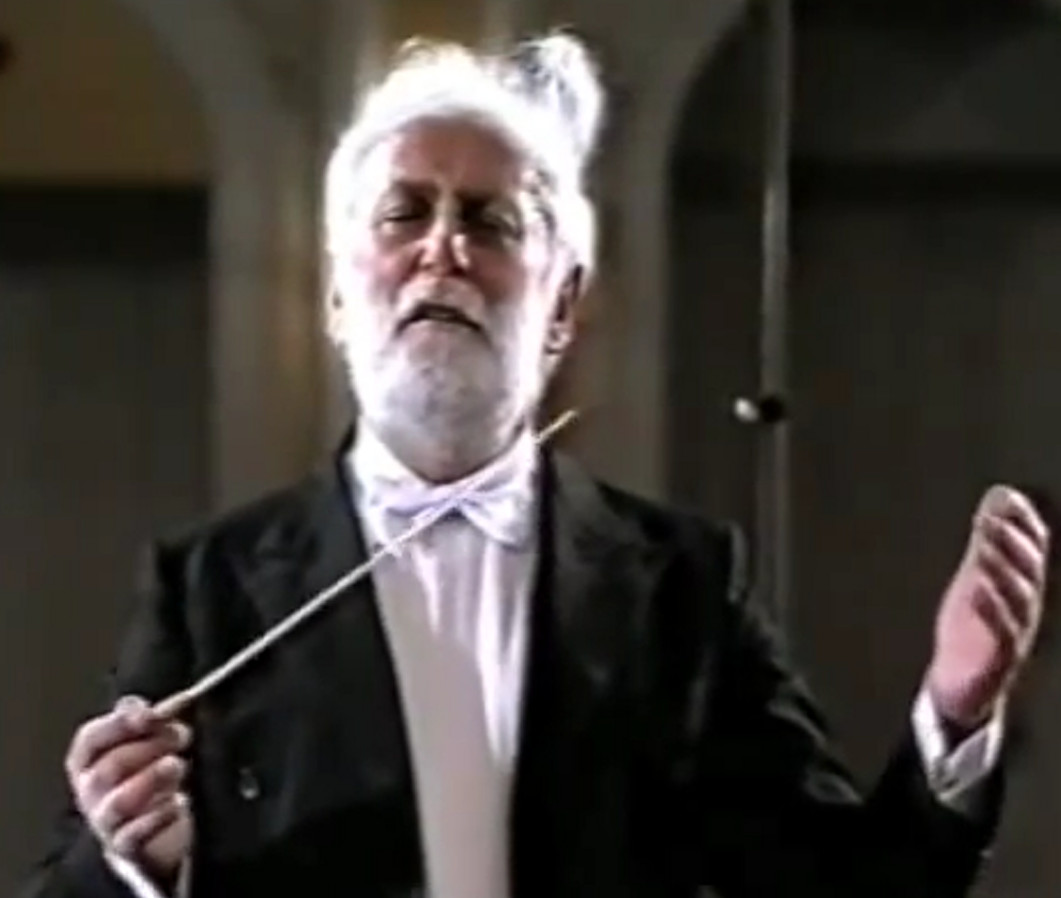
- Delman conducting

Background information
- Born: Vladimir Isaakovič Delman; 26 January 1923; Petrograd (later Leningrad, now Saint Petersburg), Russian Soviet Federative Socialist Republic
- Died: 28 August 1994 (aged 71) Bologna, Italy
- Genre: Classical
- Occupation: Conductor
- Instruments: piano, conducting

Vladimir Delman (26 January 1923 – 28 August 1994) was a Soviet-born conductor who later became an Italian citizen.

== Biography ==
Born in Petrograd, he graduated with diplomas in piano and orchestral conducting from the city’s conservatory. This marked the beginning of a long career—initially as a chorus master—that led him to conduct in major theaters across the Soviet Union and around the world.

In his home country during the 1950s, he conducted works such as Cimarosa’s "Il matrimonio segreto" (The Secret Marriage), Johann Strauss’s "Die Fledermaus" (The Bat), and Offenbach’s "Les Contes d’Hoffmann" (The Tales of Hoffmann). In 1963, he conducted Sergei Prokofiev’s "Betrothal in a Monastery", a performance broadcast by the BBC in a link-up with Radio Moscow.

Furthermore, in Moscow, he led the world premieres of two works by composer Rodion Shchedrin: "Bureaucratiade", Op. 27 (on February 24, 1965) and "Not Love Alone", Op. 47 (on January 20, 1972)—the latter with the Moscow Chamber Opera Theatre Orchestra, which he founded and directed starting in 1971.

During this same period, he also taught at the Institute of Theatre Arts. It was students from this institute, together with the Moscow Chamber Opera Theatre Orchestra, who were involved in the revival and staging of Shostakovich’s opera "The Nose".

In 1974, he received permission to leave the country and moved to Italy, eventually acquiring Italian citizenship. He began conducting at major opera houses (in Milan, Naples, Rome, and Palermo) and with leading symphony orchestras, both in Italy and abroad. Notably, in 1975, he conducted his first opera in Italy: Tchaikovsky’s "Eugene Onegin" at the Teatro Politeama Garibaldi in Palermo. In 1979, he conducted Mahler’s Symphony No. 8, the "Symphony of a Thousand", at the Teatro Comunale di Bologna. From the following year, he served as its permanent conductor (until 1983) and later spearheaded the "Teatro-Studio" initiative within the same opera house, acting as its director.

In 1984, he recorded Tchaikovsky’s six symphonies with the Orchestra del Teatro Regio di Torino, released by Fonit-Cetra as a four-CD set.

Between 1985 and 1987, he presided over the jury for the "Arturo Toscanini" International Conducting Competition in Parma, while simultaneously directing an advanced professional training course for conductors, which was integrated into the competition. From 1986 to 1988, he served as the principal conductor of the "Arturo Toscanini" Orchestra. In 1988, he collaborated with RAI on a film titled "A me l’orchestra" ("The Orchestra is mine"), directed by Fausto Dall’Olio. He also conceived and starred in the television series "Le Magnifiche Sei" ("The Magnificent Six," 1989), produced by Rai-Uno. The series focused on Tchaikovsky’s six Symphonies, performed by youth orchestras from the "Giuseppe Verdi" Conservatory in Milan (Symphonies No. 2 and No. 4), the Tchaikovsky Conservatory in Moscow (Symphonies No. 1 and No. 6), and Carnegie Mellon University in Pittsburgh (Symphonies No. 3 and No. 5).

He passed away on August 28, 1994, shortly after that remarkable inaugural season with the Orchestra Sinfonica di Milano.

He is buried in the Jewish section of the Monumental Cemetery of the Certosa in Bologna.
