= 2018 in British music =

This is a summary of the year 2018 in British music.

== Events ==
- 2 January – The Paxton Festival announces that Helen Jamieson is to stand down as its artistic director in September 2018.
- 8 January – Arts Council England announces the appointment of Claire Mera-Nelson as Director of Music and as director in its London office.
- 10 January – The Royal Philharmonic Orchestra announces the resignation of Charles Dutoit as its principal conductor and artistic adviser, with immediate effect, following allegations against Dutoit of inappropriate sexual behaviour. Dutoit had previously been scheduled to vacate the posts in 2019.
- 11 January – Sinfonia Viva announces the appointment of Frank Zielhorst as its new principal conductor, with immediate effect.
- 15 January – The Cumnock Tryst announces the appointment of Jean Nicholson as its new festival director.
- 18 January – The Southbank Centre announces that Jude Kelly is to stand down as its artistic director, effective May 2018.
- 25 January – Creative Scotland announces the newest round of Regular Funding recipients for its next three-year programme, which includes the losses of £300,000 for the Dunedin Consort and of £550,000 for the Hebrides Ensemble.
- 26 January – King's College, Cambridge announces that Stephen Cleobury is to retire as its director of music, effective 30 September 2019.
- 1 February
  - The Buxton Festival announces the appointment of Michael Williams as its next chief executive officer, effective April 2018.
  - The BBC Scottish Symphony Orchestra, under the direction of Martyn Brabbins, gives the first performance of the Symphony in B♭ by Michael Tippett since its 1935 premiere.
- 2 February – Following the release of his debut album Inspiration, Sheku Kanneh-Mason becomes the first-ever BBC Young Musician winner to enter the Official UK Albums Chart with a debut recording.
- 6 February – Creative Scotland announces restoration of £300,000 funding for 3 years to the Dunedin Consort.
- 11 February – 50 years after its composition, Richard Reason's Dylan Thomas Song Cycle receives its first performance at Conway Hall.
- 20 February – Longborough Festival Opera announces the appointment of Polly Graham, daughter of festival founders Martin and Lizzie Graham, as its new artistic director, with immediate effect.
- 22 February – A news report states that Rafael Payare is to stand down as music director of the Ulster Orchestra as of the end of his current contract, at the close of the 2018–2019 season.
- 7 March – NME announces that it is to discontinue its print edition, and to shift its publication emphasis to its online edition.
- 8 March
  - English National Opera announces the appointment of Stuart Murphy as its next chief executive, effective 3 April 2018.
  - Trinity Laban Conservatoire of Music and Dance announces its 'Venus Blazing' programme for the 2018–2019 academic year, with the commitment that music by female composers is to comprise at least 50% of the selections for its public performances.
- 14 March – The Royal Society of Musicians announces the appointment of Charlotte Penton-Smith as its first ever chief executive.
- 24 March – Glyndebourne announces the prize winners of its inaugural Glyndebourne Opera Cup competition:
  - Overall winner: Samantha Hankey
  - Second place: Jacquelyn Stucker
  - Third place: Elbenita Kajtazi
  - Ginette Theano prize (for most promising talent): Emily Pogorelc
  - Media prize: Samantha Hankey
  - Audience prize: Elbenita Kajtazi
- 28 March – The High Court of Justice rules in favour of violist Christopher Goldscheier in his lawsuit against the Royal Opera House, Covent Garden, for hearing damage from 'acoustic shock'.
- 4 April – The Royal Philharmonic Society announces the appointment of James Murphy as its next chief executive, effective in the summer of 2018.
- 5 April – The Buxton International Festival announces that its artistic director, Stephen Barlow, is to stand down from the post in late July 2018.
- 21 April – The Queen's Birthday Party, a music concert celebrating the 92nd birthday of Queen Elizabeth II, is held at London's Royal Albert Hall.
- 27 April – It is announced that Ralph Fiennes is to star in a new film about the life of George Frederic Handel, directed by Chris Addison.
- 13 May – Lauren Zhang is announced as the winner of the BBC Young Musician 2018 competition.
- 19 May – The Wedding of Prince Harry and Meghan Markle features such musicians as:
  - Choir of St George's Chapel, Windsor Castle
  - The Kingdom Choir
  - The State Trumpeters of the Household Cavalry
  - Elin Manahan Thomas
  - Sheku Kanneh-Mason
  - David Blackadder
  - Orchestral musicians from the BBC National Orchestra of Wales, the English Chamber Orchestra and the Philharmonia Orchestra, conducted by Christopher Warren-Green
- 23 May – King's College, Cambridge announces the appointment of Daniel Hyde as its next director of music, effective 1 October 2019.
- 29 May – The Scottish Chamber Orchestra announces the appointment of Maxim Emelyanychev as its next principal conductor, effective with the 2019–2020 season.
- 1 June – The Royal Philharmonic Society (RPS) announces its awarding of honorary membership in the RPS to Stephen Hough, the 141st such recipient in the history of the RPS.
- 7 June – Thea Musgrave receives The Queen's Medal for Music 2017, in a private audience with HRH Queen Elizabeth II.
- 8 June – Queen's Birthday Honours
  - Dame Kiri Te Kanawa is made a Companion of Honour.
  - Simon Keenlyside is made a Knight Bachelor.
  - Thomas Adès, Kanya King, and Gillian Moore are each made a Commander of the Order of the British Empire.
  - Alice Coote, Julian Joseph, and Debbie Wiseman are each made an Officer of the Order of the British Empire.
  - Susannah Eastburn, Rosemary Johnson, Ms. Dynamite (Niomi McLean-Daley), Orphy Robinson, and Dennis Rollins are each made a Member of the Order of the British Empire.
- 8–10 June – Download Festival 2018 takes place at Donington Park in Leicestershire. The main stage is headlined by Avenged Sevenfold, Guns N' Roses and Ozzy Osbourne, the Zippo encore stage by You Me at Six, Parkway Drive and Rise Against, the Avalanche stage by Bad Religion, Neck Deep and The Hives, and the Dogtooth stage by Tesseract, Thy Art Is Murder and Baroness.
- 26 June – Southbank Sinfonia announces the appointment of William Norris as its next managing director, effective July 2018.
- 2 July
  - The Royal Philharmonic Orchestra announces the appointment of Vasily Petrenko as its new music director, effective with the 2021–2022 season, with an initial contract of 5 years.
  - The Royal Liverpool Philharmonic Orchestra (RLPO) announces that Vasily Petrenko is to conclude his tenure as its chief conductor as of the end of the 2020–2021 season, and subsequently to take the title of conductor laureate of the RLPO.
- 4 July – The Susan Chilcott Scholarship announces soprano Gemma Summerfield as the final recipient of the Chilcott Award.
- 9 July – ORA Singers announces the appointment of Stephen Fry as its new president.
- 13 July – The Lightning Seeds' single "Three Lions" reaches number one in the UK singles chart for the fourth time following England's achievements in the 2018 FIFA World Cup, making it the only song to reach number one on four separate occasions with the same artist lineup. By the following week the single has plummeted to number 97, setting a record for the fastest ever fall from the top of the charts.
- 26 July – The Academy of Ancient Music announces that Richard Egarr is to stand down as its music director at the close of the 2020-2021 season.
- August – In 2019, streaming platform Spotify reveals that Welsh duo Alffa is the "most streamed Welsh language act ever" with three million streams for their two singles.
- 9 August – Glyndebourne Festival Opera announces the appointment of Stephen Langridge as its next artistic director, effective in the spring of 2019.
- 31 August – The Leeds International Piano Competition announces the appointment of Fiona Sinclair as its next chief executive, eff3ective 1 October 2018.
- 6 September – Welsh National Opera announces the appointment of Aidan Lang as its next general director, effective July 2019.
- 20 September – Wolf Alice are revealed as winners of the 2018 Mercury Prize for their second album Visions of a Life.
- 4 October – The BBC Philharmonic announces the appointment of Omer Meir Wellber as its next chief conductor, effective with the 2019-2020 season, with an initial contract of 4 years.
- 27 October – The Mass Via Victrix of Sir Charles Villiers Stanford receives its first-ever complete performance, 99 years after its composition, in Cardiff by the BBC National Orchestra of Wales, the BBC National Chorus of Wales, and vocal soloists Kiandra Howarth, Jess Dancy, Ruairi Bowen, and Gareth Brynmor John.
- 5 November – The Dartington International Summer School and Festival announces the appointment of Sara Mohr-Pietsch as its next artistic director, effective January 2019, with her first programmed season scheduled to occur in 2020.
- 6 November – Glyndebourne Festival Opera announces the appointment of Ben Glassberg as the new principal conductor of the Glyndebourne Tour, with an initial contract of 3 years.
- 23 November – The Donatella Flick LSO Conducting Competition 2018 announces Felix Mildenberger as its winner, which includes the appointment of Mildenberger as the new assistant conductor of the London Symphony Orchestra for a 2-year period.
- 26 November – The Royal Northern College of Music announces the appointment of Sara Ascenso as its first-ever lecturer in Musicians' Health and Wellbeing, the first UK music institution ever to institute such a post.
- 3 December – Chetham's School of Music announces the appointment of Tom Redmond as its next director of music, effective September 2019.
- 4 December – The Philharmonia Orchestra announces that Esa-Pekka Salonen is to stand down as its principal conductor after the close of the 2020-2021 season.
- 19 December – The Royal Scottish National Orchestra announces the appointment of Alistair Mackie as its next chief executive, effective April 2019.
- 28 December – New Year's Honours:
  - Nicola Benedetti, Nick Mason, and Nitin Sawhney are each made a Commander of the Order of British Empire.
  - Christian Blackshaw, Stephen Darlington, Gordon Giltrap, David Hill, Jacqueline Tyler, and Neil Warnock are each made a Member of the Order of the British Empire.
  - Shirley Thompson is made an Officer of the Order of the British Empire.
- Undated – London drill rapper Digga D and group 1011 are issued with a Criminal Behaviour Order (CBO) that places restrictions on their music, including requiring them to have the Metropolitan Police's permission before releasing any new music.

== Television programmes ==
- 23 February – The Old Grey Whistle Test – one-off special episode
- 6 April–4 May – Sounds Like Friday Night – Series 2
- 8 May–12 June – Later... with Jools Holland – Series 52

== Artists and groups reformed ==
- BBMak
- The Bluebells
- The Kinks
- Late of the Pier
- Spice Girls
- Westlife
- The Zutons

== Groups disbanded ==
- Chas & Dave
- The Fall
- Frightened Rabbit
- Hookworms
- Runrig
- Splashh
- Spring King
- The Strypes
- Thumpers
- Ultimate Painting
- Wild Beasts

== Classical works ==
- Richard Barnard – In Cambridge Town
- Iain Bell – Aurora
- Harrison Birtwistle – Keyboard Engine
- Bishi – The Good Immigrant
- Mark David Boden – Clarinet Concerto
- Laura Bowler – /ˌfɛmɪˈnɪnɪti/.
- Rory Boyle – Songs of the Marshes
- Charlotte Bray – Reflections in Time
- Ewan Campbell – Frail Skies
- Joe Cutler – Elsewhereness
- Jonathan Dove – The Kerry Christmas Carol
- Brian Elias – L'innominata
- Samantha Fernando – Formations
- Cheryl Frances-Hoad
  - Between the Skies, the River and the Hills (piano concerto)
  - Last Man Standing (text by Tamsin Collison)
- Alex Gowan-Webster – Cantio Invocatione
- Helen Grime (music) and Fiona Benson (texts) – Bright Travellers
- Helen Grime – Woven Space
- Simon Holt
  - Llanto (para las chumberas) (Lament [for the prickly pears])
  - 4th Quartet ('Cloud House')
- Thomas Hyde
  - Symphony
  - Les at Leisure (comedy overture)
- Sarah Jenkins – And the sun stood still
- Nicola LeFanu (music) and Wendy Cope (text) – St Hilda of Whitby
- Benedict Mason – Ricochet
- Christian Mason – Man Made
- David Matthews – Symphony No 9
- Anna Meredith – Five Telegrams
- Stephen Montague
  - Beguiled (for solo piano)
  - Hound Dog Blues
- Thea Musgrave
  - La Vida es Sueño
  - Whirlwind
- Roxanna Panufnik – Songs of Darkness, Dreams of Light
- Francis Pott – Ardor Amoris
- Stephen Pratt – Symphonies of Time and Tide
- Deborah Pritchard – River Above
- Guto Puw – Camouflage
- Rebecca Saunders
  - Unbreathed (for string quartet)
  - O, Yes & I
- Dobrinka Tabakova – Tectonic
- Joby Talbot – Ink Dark Moon (Guitar Concerto)
- Bramwell Tovey – Sinfonia Della Passione
- Philip Venables
  - The Gender Agenda
  - Venables Plays Bartók (violin concerto)
- Errollyn Wallen – Concerto for Violin, Viola and Accordion
- Huw Watkins – Spring
- Lara Weaver – Christus factus est
- Judith Weir – Piano Quintet (A Song of Departure)
- Alison Willis – A Light Not Yet Ready to Go Out
- Alex Woolf (music) and Gillian Clarke (new text) – Requiem

== Opera ==
- Sir George Benjamin and Martin Crimp – Lessons in Love and Violence
- Tansy Davies and Nick Drake – The Cave
- Emily Howard and Selma Dimitrijevic – To See the Invisible
- Elena Langer and Emma Jenkins – Rhondda Rips It Up!
- David Sawer and Rory Mullarkey – The Skating Rink
- Mark-Anthony Turnage and Rory Mullarkey – Coraline

== Musical theatre ==
- Sylvia, with music by DJ Walde and Josh Cohen.

== Musical films ==
- Been So Long, starring Michaela Coel
- Bohemian Rhapsody, starring Rami Malek, with music by Queen
- Mamma Mia! Here We Go Again, starring Lily James, Julie Walters and Colin Firth, with music by ABBA.

== Film scores and incidental music ==
=== Film ===
- Howard Goodall – Johnny English Strikes Again
- Steven Price – Ophelia

=== Television ===
- Isobel Waller-Bridge
  - The ABC Murders
  - Vanity Fair

== British music awards ==
- Brit Awards – see 2018 Brit Awards

=== British Composer Awards ===
- Amateur or Young Performers: Oliver Searle – Microscopic Dances
- Chamber Ensemble: James Weeks – Libro di fiammelle e ombre
- Choral: Judith Weir – In the Land of Uz
- Community or Educational Project: Liam Taylor-West – The Umbrella
- Jazz Composition for Large Ensemble: Cassie Kinoshi – Afronaut
- Jazz Composition for Small Ensemble: Simon Lasky – Close to Ecstasy
- Orchestral: Sir Harrison Birtwistle – Deep Time
- Small Chamber: Rebecca Saunders – Inbreathed
- Solo or Duo: Dominic Murcott – The Harmonic Canon
- Sonic Art: Emily Peasgood – Halfway to Heaven
- Stage Works: Oliver Coates – Shoreline
- Wind Band or Brass Band: Simon Dobson – The Turing Test
- British Composer Award for Innovation: Trevor Wishart
- British Composer Award for Inspiration: Sally Beamish

== Deaths ==
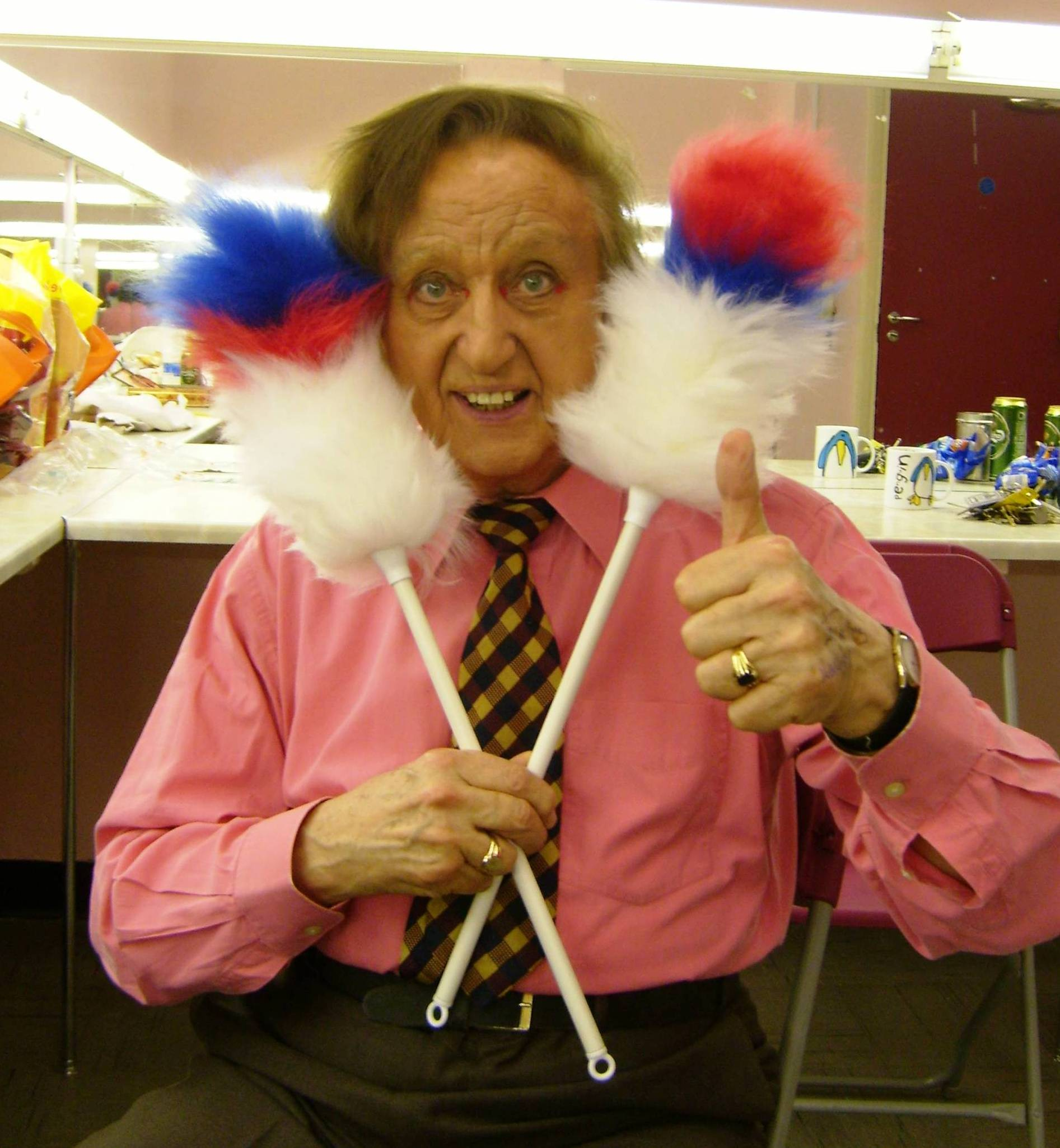
Ken Dodd

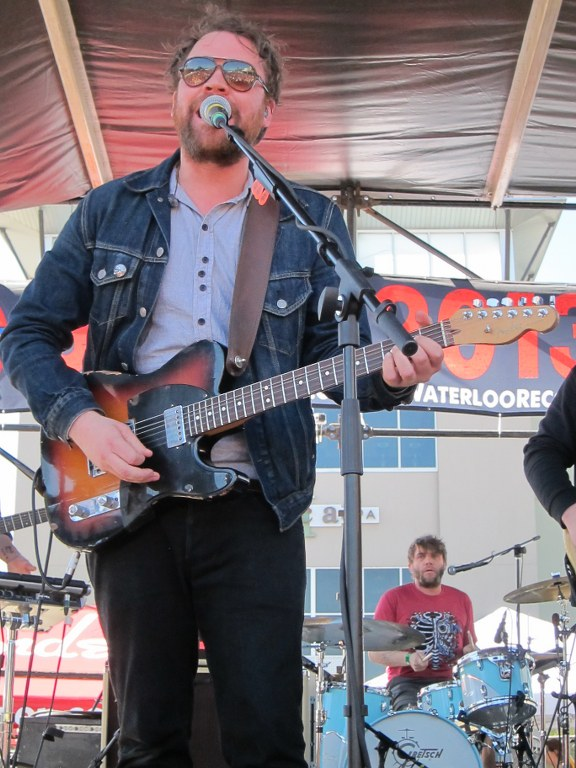
Scott Hutchison

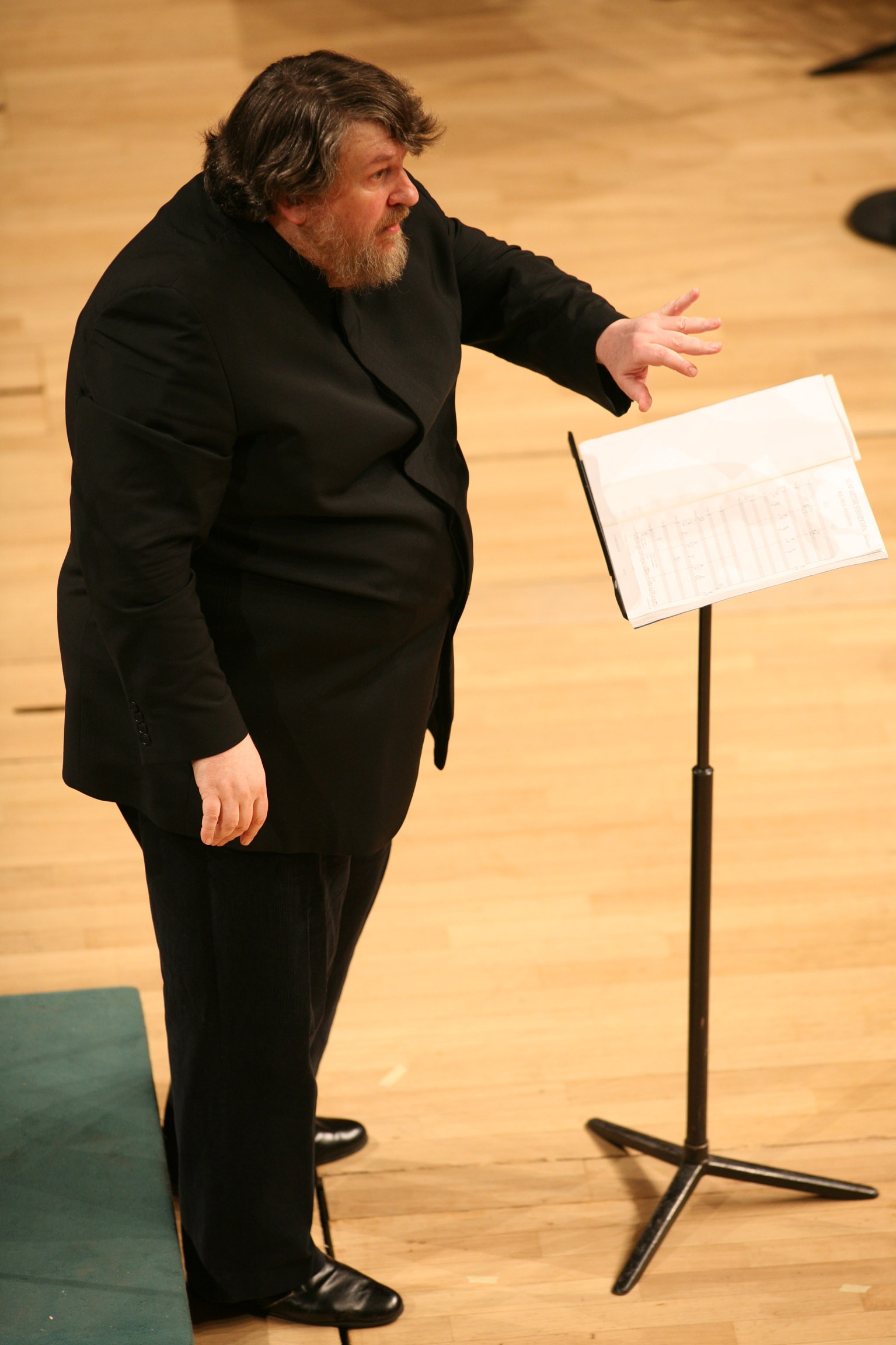
Oliver Knussen

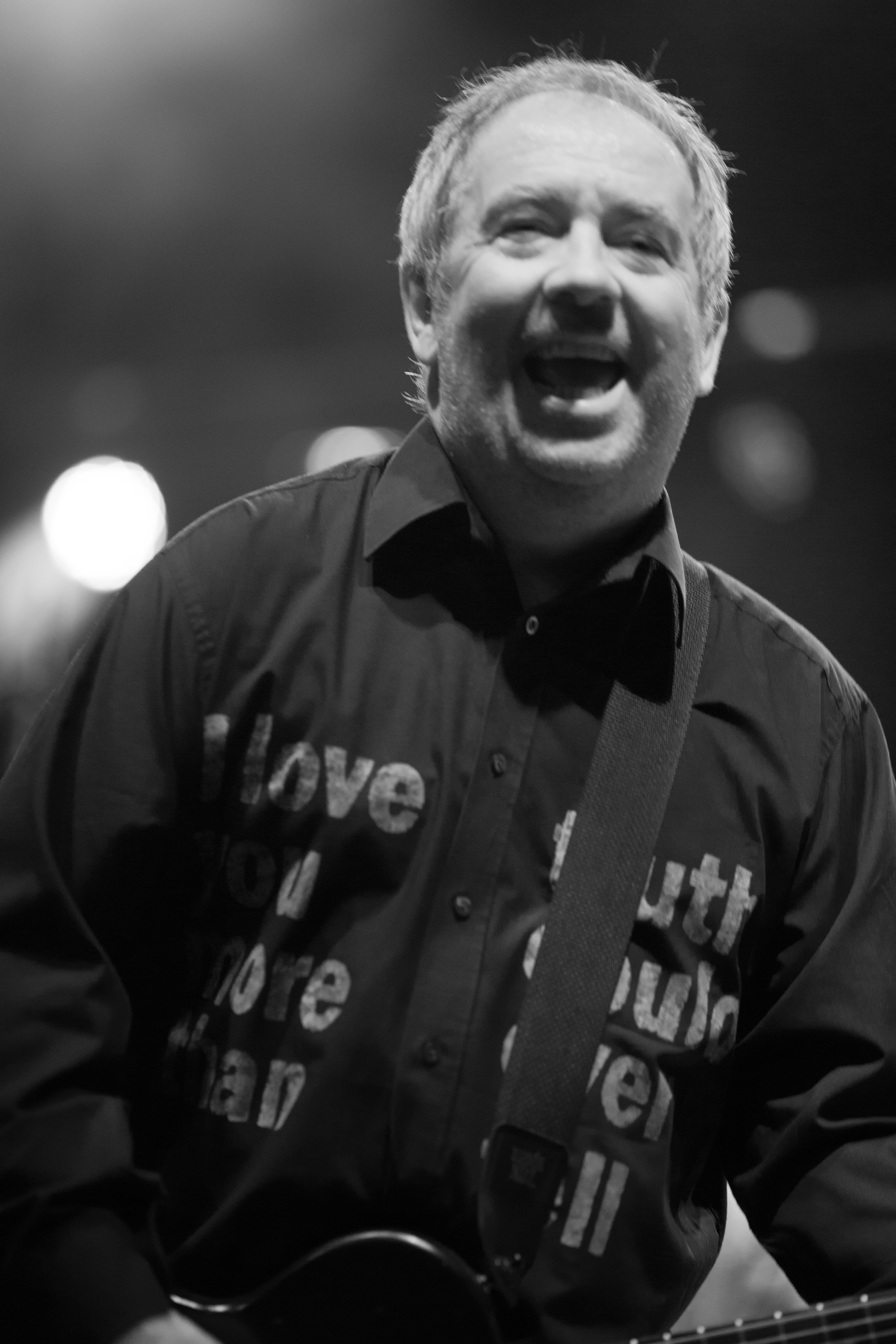
Pete Shelley

- 1 January – Peter Evans, music scholar and expert on the music of Benjamin Britten, 88
- 2 January – Tony Calder, record executive, producer and manager, 74
- 4 January – Ray Thomas, founding member of The Moody Blues, flautist, singer and composer, 76
- 10 January – Eddie Clarke, better known as "Fast" Eddie Clarke, guitarist and member of heavy metal bands Fastway and Motörhead, 67. Of Motörhead's classic lineup, which consisted of Lemmy, himself and Phil "Philthy Animal" Taylor, he was the last surviving member.
- 16 January – Dave Holland, drummer (Trapeze), 69
- 20 January – Jim Rodford, bass guitarist for Argent, The Kinks and The Zombies, 76
- 24 January – Mark E. Smith, vocalist and frontman and the only constant member of The Fall, 60
- 10 February – Raimund Herincx, baritone, 90
- 19 February – Stormin (born Shaun Lewis), grime and drum and bass MC, 34
- 23 February – Eddy Amoo, singer for The Real Thing, 74
- 11 March – Ken Dodd, singer, comedian, actor, 90
- 28 March – Philip De Groote, South African-born cellist and founding member of the Chilingirian Quartet, 68
- 15 April – Peter Lloyd, orchestral flautist, 86
- 9–10 May (confirmed 11 May) – Scott Hutchison, singer, songwriter, musician Frightened Rabbit, 36
- 1 June – Andrew Massey, conductor based in America, 72
- 8 June – Danny Kirwan, guitarist, songwriter (Fleetwood Mac), 68
- 12 June – Jon Hiseman, drummer, 73
- 2 July – Alan Longmuir, bassist (Bay City Rollers), 70
- 8 July – Oliver Knussen, classical composer, 66
- 9 August – Arthur Davies, operatic tenor, 77
- 24 August – James Mallinson, British classical recording engineer, 75
- 1 September – Kenneth Bowen, Welsh tenor, 86
- 15 September – Helen Clare, English singer, 101
- 22 September – Chas Hodges, musician (Chas & Dave), 74 (organ failure)
- 1 October – Ben Daglish, 52, English composer and musician, lung cancer.
- 2 October – Geoff Emerick, recording engineer (Abbey Road Studios, The Beatles), multi-Grammy winner, 72
- 4 October – John Tyrrell, 76, musicologist.
- 7 October – John Wicks, 65, producer, singer and musician (The Records).
- 25 October – Martin Dalby, composer and music administrator, 76
- 6 November – Hugh McDowell, 65, cellist (Electric Light Orchestra)
- 16 November
  - Alec Finn, 74, English-born Irish bouzouki player (De Dannan).
  - Al James, 73, bass player (Showaddywaddy)
- 17 November – Richard Baker, news reader and BBC classical music television presenter, 94
- 20 November
  - Levine Andrade, 64, Indian-born violinist and founding member of the Arditti Quartet.
  - Roy Bailey, 83, English folk singer.
- 28 November – Gary Haisman, 60, English musician.
- 6 December – Pete Shelley. 63, singer, musician (Buzzcocks), heart attack.

== See also ==
- 2018 in British radio
- 2018 in British television
- 2018 in the United Kingdom
