= 2015 in British music =

This is a summary of the year 2015 in British music.

== Events ==
- 5 January – An official statement from Glyndebourne confirms that Danielle De Niese and her husband, Gus Christie, chairman of Glyndebourne Opera, are expecting their first child.
- 15 January – The nominations for the 2015 Brit Awards are announced, with Ed Sheeran, Sam Smith and George Ezra dominating many of the categories.
- 22 January – It is announced that BBC Radio 1's annual Big Weekend event this year will be held at Earlham Park, Norwich.
- 8 February – Sam Smith is the big winner at the 57th Annual Grammy Awards, winning Best New Artist, and Record and Song of the Year for "Stay with Me" from the album In the Lonely Hour, which subsequently won Best Vocal Album.
- 25 February – Ed Sheeran and Paloma Faith win Best British Male and Female Solo Artist at this year's Brit Awards, with x winning Best Album and "Uptown Funk" winning Best Single. Notable moments of the night include Kanye West's controversial performance of "All Day" and Madonna falling off stage during her performance of "Living for Love".
- 27 February – Disgraced former glam rocker Gary Glitter is sentenced to 16 years in prison after being found guilty of sexual offences with minors dating back between 1975–1980
- 1 March – Audio streaming became incorporated into the UK Albums Chart.
- 3 March – The London Symphony Orchestra announces the appointment of Sir Simon Rattle as its next music director, effective September 2017, with an initial contract of 5 years.
- 7 March – The BBC confirms that Electro Velvet's 1920s inspired song "Still in Love with You" has been chosen to represent the UK at this year's Eurovision Song Contest.
- 9 March
  - Sam Smith releases a special remake of their song "Lay Me Down", featuring John Legend, as this year's official Comic Relief single.
  - English National Opera announces the appointment of Cressida Pollock as interim Chief Executive Officer.
- 10 March – Sarah Brightman confirms she has been working on a song with Andrew Lloyd Webber that she can perform in space aboard the International Space Station in September. Brightman subsequently withdraws from the planned flight, citing family commitments.
- 11 March
  - The BBC Scottish Symphony Orchestra announces the appointment of Thomas Dausgaard as its 11th chief conductor, effective with the 2016–2017 season.
  - Simon Halsey is announced as the recipient of the Queen's Medal for Music 2014.
- 18 March – Julian Lloyd Webber is confirmed as the Principal of Birmingham Conservatoire.
- 20 May – Ye Yanchen's new work, Septet, to be premiered at St Illtud's Church, Llantwit Major, by soloists from China’s National Centre for the Performing Arts Orchestra.
- 23 May – The United Kingdom is represented at the Eurovision Song Contest in Vienna, Austria, by Electro Velvet, with the song "Still in Love with You". They finish 24th out of 27 entries, scoring five points.
- 12 June – Musicians recognised in the 2015 Birthday Honours include conductor Sir Neville Marriner (Companion of Honour) composers Karl Jenkins and James MacMillan who receive knighthoods, and singers Michael Ball (OBE) and Van Morrison (knighthood)
- 12–14 June – Download Festival 2015 takes place at Donington Park in Leicestershire. The main stage is headlined by Slipknot, Muse and Kiss, the Zippo encore stage by Black Stone Cherry, Marilyn Manson and Enter Shikari, the Maverick stage by Fightstar, Andrew W.K. and Yellowcard, Jake's Stage by A, Hey! Hello! and Suicidal Tendencies, and the Dog's Bed stage by Tim Vantol and Like a Storm.
- 21 June – Nadine Koutcher wins the 2015 BBC Cardiff Singer of the World competition.
- September – A-level student Jessy McCabe persuades examination board Edexcel to ensure that female composers are in future included in its Music syllabus.
- 21 September – English National Opera announces the appointments of Harry Brünjes as chairman and confirms Cressida Pollock as CEO for an additional three years.
- 23 September – Welsh National Opera announces the appointment of Tomáš Hanus as music director for the 2016–2017 season, and of Carlo Rizzi as conductor laureate with immediate effect.
- 2 October – "Writing's on the Wall" by Sam Smith, the theme for the new James Bond movie Spectre, becomes the first ever Bond theme to reach number 1 in the UK.
- 23 October – "Hello", the lead single from Adele's third studio album 25, is released to intense global media attention. The album (released 20 November) becomes the fastest selling in UK chart history, ending the year on 2.5 million.
- 18 November – The Three Choirs Festival announces that Alexis Paterson will take over as chief executive in January 2016.
- 13 December – Louisa Johnson wins the twelfth series of The X Factor. Reggie 'n' Bollie are named runner-ups, while Ché Chesterman and Lauren Murray finish in third and fourth place respectively.
- December – As a result of a campaign led by student Jessy McCabe, exam board Edexcel announces that it has changed its A-level music syllabus to include female composers.

== Television series ==
- 10 January
  - Launch of the fourth series of The Voice UK.
  - Return of Stars in Their Eyes after nearly ten years off air.
- 14 February – Peter Sarsfield wins the first revival series of Harry Hill's Stars in Their Eyes, impersonating Frankie Valli.
- 16 January – Sound of Song, presented by Neil Brand
- 26 January – Launch of new music based entertainment show, South Side Story.
- 2 February – Global Radio, the owners of pop music channel Heart TV, are reprimanded by Ofcom after the channel played 72 seconds more than the permitted amount of advertising during one particular hour in October 2014. Global says the incident occurred when a commercial break was pushed to the end of an hour, creating too much advertising time for the following hour.
- 14 February – Stars in Their Eyes is cancelled again after critical reviews of its revamped format.
- 7 March – Reginald D. Hunter's Songs of the South begins on BBC Two.
- 26 May – The BBC announces that its music panel quiz Never Mind the Buzzcocks is to end after 18 years and 28 series.
- 28 June – Pappano's Classical Voices begins on BBC Four.
- 29 August – Launch of the twelfth series of The X Factor.
- 19 December – Jay McGuinness of The Wanted and his dance partner Aliona Vilani win the thirteenth series of Strictly Come Dancing.
- 20 December – The Sound of Music Live is broadcast on ITV, starring Kara Tointon and Julian Ovenden.

== Publications ==
- Karl Jenkins – Still with the Music

== Artists and groups reformed ==
- Bay City Rollers
- Black Grape
- The Bluetones
- Busted
- Faithless
- The King Blues
- Lush
- Simply Red
- Supertramp
- We've Got a Fuzzbox and We're Gonna Use It

== Groups on hiatus ==
- Blur
- The Saturdays

== Groups disbanded ==
- Does It Offend You, Yeah?
- Heart In Hand
- Flesh for Lulu
- Kingsland Road
- Klaxons
- Motörhead
- Neon Jungle
- Noah and the Whale
- Ph.D
- Rise to Remain
- Stereo Kicks

== Classical works ==
- Eleanor Alberga – Arise, Athena!
- Julian Anderson
  - In lieblicher Bläue (Violin Concerto)
  - Van Gogh Blue
- Richard Ayres – No 48 (In the Night Studio)
- Guy Barker – The Lanterne of Light
- Gerald Barry – The One-Armed Pianist
- Sally Beamish – "Be still" (Introit)
- Luke Bedford
  - Instability
  - Saxophone Quartet
- Fiona Bennett – The New Lady Radnor's Suite
- Judith Bingham
  - Ghostly Grace
  - Zodiack
- Harrison Birtwistle
  - The Cure
  - The Silk House Sequences
- Victoria Borisova-Ollas – ... and time is running past midnight ...
- Mark Bowden and Owen Sheers – A Violence of Gifts
- Gary Carpenter – Dadaville
- Pete Churchill – Echoes: A Song of Poland
- James Clapperton – Northern Sky
- Anna Clyne – The Seamstress
- Edward Cowie – Three Spitfire Motets
- Paul Crabtree – O Icarus
- Laurence Crane: Chamber Symphony No 2 ('The Australian')
- Tansy Davies – Re-greening
- Benjamin Ellin – Miyabi – Concerto for Violin and Orchestra
- David Fennessy – Hirta Rounds
- Michael Finnissy – Janne
- Peter Fribbins – Violin Concerto
- Alexander Goehr
  - Variations (Homage to Haydn), for solo piano
  - Seven Impromptus, op 96, for two pianos
- Helen Grime – Concerto for clarinet and trumpet
- Barry Guy – Mr Babbage is Coming to Dinner
- Robin Holloway
  - Soldered Schumann
  - Silvered Schubert
  - Europa and the Bull (tuba concerto)
- Mica Levi – Greezy
- James MacMillan
  - A Little Mass
  - Symphony No 4
- Colin Matthews and Michael Morpurgo – The Pied Piper of Hamelin
- David Matthews – Symphony No 8
- Melinda Maxwell – FRACTURES: Monk Unpacked
- Christopher Mayo – Supermarine
- Anna Meredith – Smatter Hauler
- Thea Musgrave – Power Play
- Mark Simpson
  - Israfel
  - The Immortal (text by Melanie Challenger)
- Howard Skempton – The Rime of the Ancient Mariner
- Errollyn Wallen – Rebuttal Blues No 1
- Bertram Wee – Dithyrambs
- Judith Weir – Good Morning, Midnight
- Michael Wolters – Requiem to Let
- Hugh Wood – Epithalamion
- Raymond Yiu – Symphony

== Opera ==
- 21 May – UK premiere of Gaetano Donizetti's Poliuto at Glyndebourne.
- Charlotte Bray and Amy Rosenthal – Entanglement
- Tansy Davies and Nick Drake – Between Worlds
- Matt Rogers and Sally O'Reilly – The Virtues of Things
- Joby Talbot and Gene Scheer – Everest

== Musical theatre ==
- Bend It Like Beckham the Musical, with music by Howard Goodall, lyrics by Charles Hart, and book by Gurinder Chadha and Paul Mayeda Berges
- School of Rock, with music by Andrew Lloyd Webber and book by Julian Fellowes
- The Mirror Never Lies, music by Juan Iglesias, book and lyrics by Joe Giuffre, based on a novel by Barbara Pym

== Musical films ==
- Kill Your Friends, starring Nicholas Hoult and Georgia King.
- London Road, starring Olivia Colman and Anita Dobson

== Film scores and incidental music ==
=== Film ===
- Craig Armstrong – Far from the Madding Crowd
- Patrick Doyle – Cinderella
- George Fenton – Absolutely Anything
- Henry Jackman – Kingsman: The Secret Service

=== Television ===
- Anne Dudley – Poldark
- Debbie Wiseman – Wolf Hall

== British music awards ==
=== Brit Awards ===
See 2015 Brit Awards

=== British Composer Awards ===
- Amateur or Young Performers: Kate Whitley – Alive
- Choral: James Dillon – Stabat Mater dolorosa
- Community or Educational Project: Stuart Hancock – Snapshot Songs
- Contemporary Jazz Composition: Trish Clowes – The Fox, The Parakeet & The Chestnut
- Large Chamber: Sinan Savaskan – Many stares (through semi-nocturnal Zeiss-Blink) – Module 30
- Liturgical: Michael Finnissy – John the Baptist
- Orchestral: Harrison Birtwistle – Responses: Sweet disorder and the carefully careless
- Small Chamber: Julian Anderson – String Quartet No. 2
- Solo or Duo: Michael Finnissy – Beat Generation Ballads
- Sonic Art: Yann Seznec – Currents
- Stage Works: Julian Anderson – Thebans
- Wind Band or Brass Band: Rory Boyle – Muckle Flugga

== Charts and sales ==
=== Notable events and records ===
On 10 July 2015, the chart week changed from Sunday–Saturday to Friday–Thursday, with the first chart covering Sunday 5 July to Thursday 9 July. This chart move is to align the chart week with the new Global Release Day (Friday) for music.

Pharrell Williams set an all-time record when "Happy" notched 64 consecutive weeks in the top 75 of the singles chart.

Adele's 25 became the fastest-selling UK album of all time, beating the record previously held by Oasis' Be Here Now in 1997.

Jess Glynne scored three UK number-one singles and two from the previous year, tying here with Cheryl Fernandez-Versini as the British women with the most UK number-one singles.

In December, Justin Bieber's songs "Sorry" and "Love Yourself" claimed the top 2 spots on the singles chart during the same week, marking the first time this was accomplished since Madonna in 1985. "Love Yourself" went on to replace "Sorry" in the top position, making Bieber the first artist since Elvis Presley in 2005 to knock themselves off the top spot.

=== Number-one singles ===
The singles chart includes a proportion for streaming.

Key
†	Best performing single of the year

Chart date (week ending)	Song	Artist(s)	Chart sales	References (Note: 1st ref: chart position; 2nd: chart sales (sales + streams/100))
3 January	"Uptown Funk" †	Mark Ronson featuring Bruno Mars	186,655	
10 January	"Uptown Funk" †	Mark Ronson featuring Bruno Mars	156,335	
17 January	"Uptown Funk" †	Mark Ronson featuring Bruno Mars	129,871	
24 January	"Uptown Funk" †	Mark Ronson featuring Bruno Mars	125,948	
31 January	"Uptown Funk" †	Mark Ronson featuring Bruno Mars	120,443	
7 February	"Uptown Funk" †	Mark Ronson featuring Bruno Mars	101,962	
14 February	"Love Me like You Do"	Ellie Goulding	172,368	
21 February	"Love Me like You Do"	Ellie Goulding	118,225	
28 February	"Love Me like You Do"	Ellie Goulding	118,343	
7 March	"Love Me like You Do"	Ellie Goulding	98,167	
14 March	"King"	Years & Years	100,955	
21 March	"Lay Me Down"	Sam Smith featuring John Legend	105,070	
28 March	"Lay Me Down"	Sam Smith featuring John Legend	68,739	
4 April	"Hold My Hand"	Jess Glynne	97,494	
11 April	"Hold My Hand"	Jess Glynne	80,177	
18 April	"Hold My Hand"	Jess Glynne	57,372	
25 April	"See You Again"	Wiz Khalifa featuring Charlie Puth	193,018	
2 May	"See You Again"	Wiz Khalifa featuring Charlie Puth	141,671	
9 May	"Cheerleader"	OMI	112,626	
16 May	"Cheerleader"	OMI	96,533	
23 May	"Cheerleader"	OMI	89,201	
30 May	"Cheerleader"	OMI	76,572	
6 June	"Want to Want Me"	Jason Derulo	127,113	
13 June	"Want to Want Me"	Jason Derulo	75,066	
20 June	"Want to Want Me"	Jason Derulo	65,300	
27 June	"Want to Want Me"	Jason Derulo	57,039	
4 July	"Not Letting Go"	Tinie Tempah featuring Jess Glynne	110,001	
9 July	"Are You with Me"	Lost Frequencies	83,712	
16 July	"House Every Weekend"	David Zowie	54,929*	
23 July	"Black Magic"	Little Mix	112,684	
30 July	"Black Magic"	Little Mix	65,720	
6 August	"Black Magic"	Little Mix	59,877	
13 August	"Drag Me Down"	One Direction	76,015	
20 August	"Marvin Gaye"	Charlie Puth featuring Meghan Trainor	94,455	
27 August	"Don't Be So Hard on Yourself"	Jess Glynne	61,994	
3 September	"Fight Song"	Rachel Platten	58,581	
10 September	"What Do You Mean?"	Justin Bieber	83,746	
17 September	"Easy Love"	Sigala	82,237	
24 September	"What Do You Mean?"	Justin Bieber	66,876	
1 October	"What Do You Mean?"	Justin Bieber	60,782	
8 October	"Writing's on the Wall"	Sam Smith	69,604	
15 October	"What Do You Mean?"	Justin Bieber	50,927	
22 October	"What Do You Mean?"	Justin Bieber	46,533	
29 October	"Turn the Music Louder (Rumble)"	KDA featuring Tinie Tempah & Katy B	60,334	
5 November	"Hello"	Adele	332,599	
12 November	"Hello"	Adele	179,406	
19 November	"Hello"	Adele	127,075	
26 November	"Sorry"	Justin Bieber	104,472	
3 December	"Sorry"	Justin Bieber	111,655	
10 December	"Love Yourself"	Justin Bieber	115,821	
17 December	"Love Yourself"	Justin Bieber	113,709	
24 December	"Love Yourself"	Justin Bieber	102,084	
31 December	"A Bridge over You"	NHS Choir	127,490	

=== Number-one albums ===
The 'sales' figures since the chart week ending 7 March include a proportion for audio streams.

Key
†	Best performing album of the year

Chart date (week ending)	Album	Artist	Sales / chart sales	References (Note: 1st ref: chart position; 2nd: chart sales (sales + streams))
3 January	x	Ed Sheeran	211,168	
10 January	Wanted on Voyage	George Ezra	72,121	
17 January	In the Lonely Hour	Sam Smith	34,551	
24 January	Wanted on Voyage	George Ezra	24,553	
31 January	Uptown Special	Mark Ronson	33,380	
7 February	Title	Meghan Trainor	25,246	
14 February	Shadows in the Night	Bob Dylan	22,031	
21 February	In the Lonely Hour	Sam Smith	34,422	
28 February	Smoke + Mirrors	Imagine Dragons	25,675	
7 March	In the Lonely Hour	Sam Smith	40,874	
14 March	Chasing Yesterday	Noel Gallagher's High Flying Birds	89,110	
21 March	In the Lonely Hour	Sam Smith	49,482	
28 March	To Pimp a Butterfly	Kendrick Lamar	29,695	
4 April	Chaos and the Calm	James Bay	64,440	
11 April	The Day Is My Enemy	The Prodigy	45,302	
18 April	Future Hearts	All Time Low	19,463	
25 April	The Ultimate Collection	Paul Simon	15,487	
2 May	Stages	Josh Groban	20,092	
9 May	The Magic Whip	Blur	43,746	
16 May	Wilder Mind	Mumford & Sons	81,351	
23 May	Wilder Mind	Mumford & Sons	29,922	
30 May	The Desired Effect	Brandon Flowers	31,077	
6 June	85% Proof	Will Young	21,321	
13 June	How Big, How Blue, How Beautiful	Florence and the Machine	68,788	
20 June	Drones	Muse	72,863	
27 June	Drones	Muse	24,445	
4 July	How Big, How Blue, How Beautiful	Florence and the Machine	14,419	
9 July	The Definitive Collective	Lionel Richie	19,896	
16 July	x	Ed Sheeran	19,754*	
23 July	Communion	Years & Years	55,592	
30 July	Communion	Years & Years	20,627	
6 August	Born in the Echoes	The Chemical Brothers	18,056	
13 August	Marks to Prove It	The Maccabees	16,082	
20 August	Compton	Dr. Dre	45,721	
27 August	The Very Best of Cilla Black	Cilla Black	12,965	
3 September	I Cry When I Laugh	Jess Glynne	59,117	
10 September	Beauty Behind the Madness	The Weeknd	34,819	
17 September	The Book of Souls	Iron Maiden	60,249	
24 September	Keep the Village Alive	Stereophonics	44,868	
1 October	Rattle That Lock	David Gilmour	48,075	
8 October	Caracal	Disclosure	26,789	
15 October	We the Generation	Rudimental	22,718	
22 October	Faithless 2.0	Faithless	12,341	
29 October	Jamie Lawson	Jamie Lawson	20,351	
5 November	Sounds Good Feels Good	5 Seconds of Summer	42,459	
12 November	If I Can Dream	Elvis Presley	79,053	
19 November	If I Can Dream	Elvis Presley	88,603	
26 November	Made in the A.M.	One Direction	93,189	
3 December	25 †	Adele	800,307	
10 December	25 †	Adele	439,337	
17 December	25 †	Adele	353,765	
24 December	25 †	Adele	376,716	
31 December	25 †	Adele	449,870	

=== Number-one compilation albums ===
Key
†	Best-selling compilation of the year

Chart date (week ending)	Album	Sales	References (Note: 1st ref: chart position; 2nd: sales)
3 January	Now 89	150,703	
10 January	Now 89	43,093	
17 January	Now 89	21,264	
24 January	Now 89	15,962	
31 January	The Weekender	15,230	
7 February	Now Power Ballads	17,427	
14 February	Now Power Ballads	18,601	
21 February	Fifty Shades Of Grey	41,080	
28 February	Fifty Shades Of Grey	45,684	
7 March	Fifty Shades Of Grey	36,038	
14 March	Fifty Shades Of Grey	27,755	
21 March	Fifty Shades Of Grey	29,294	
28 March	Fifty Shades Of Grey	15,253	
4 April	Move On Up: The Very Best of Northern Soul	14,236	
11 April	Now 90	264,159	
18 April	Now 90	105,020	
25 April	Now 90	63,008	
2 May	Now 90	44,426	
9 May	Now 90	38,959	
16 May	Now 90	29,014	
23 May	Now 90	25,964	
30 May	Now 90	24,789	
6 June	Now 90	22,554	
13 June	Now Classic Rock	18,131	
20 June	TFI Friday	18,668	
27 June	Now Classic Rock	33,238	
4 July	Now Summer Party	33,340	
9 July	Now Summer Party	34,885	
16 July	Now Summer Party	23,726*	
23 July	Now Summer Party	36,471	
30 July	Now Summer Party	31,070	
6 August	Now 91	224,172	
13 August	Now 91	118,073	
20 August	Now 91	66,074	
27 August	Now 91	45,642	
3 September	Now 91	34,933	
10 September	Now 91	30,229	
17 September	Now 91	22,327	
24 September	Now 91	18,383	
1 October	Now 91	16,051	
8 October	Now 91	14,775	
15 October	Keep Calm and Unwind	14,966	
22 October	Rapper's Delight	16,247	
29 October	Rapper's Delight	14,634	
5 November	Now Singer	13,438	
12 November	BBC Radio 1's Live Lounge 2015	23,194	
19 November	The Annual 2016	22,692	
26 November	The Annual 2016	21,132	
3 December	Now 92 †	211,548	
10 December	Now 92 †	159,716	
17 December	Now 92 †	120,919	
24 December	Now 92 †	111,116	
31 December	Now 92 †	146,967	

=== Top singles of the year ===
This chart was published by the Official Charts Company in January 2016 showing sales and streams for the whole of 2015.

Combined position	Title	Artist(s)	Peak position	Combined sales
1	"Uptown Funk"	Mark Ronson featuring Bruno Mars	1	1,760,000
2	"Cheerleader"	OMI	1	1,520,000
3	"Take Me to Church"	Hozier	2	1,250,000
4	"Love Me like You Do"	Ellie Goulding	1	1,190,000
5	"See You Again"	Wiz Khalifa featuring Charlie Puth	1	1,170,000
6	"Hello"	Adele	1	1,120,000
7	"Lean On"	Major Lazer & DJ Snake featuring MØ	2	
8	"Hold Back the River"	James Bay	2	
9	"What Do You Mean?"	Justin Bieber	1	988,000
10	"Sorry"	Justin Bieber	1	934,000
11	"King"	Years & Years	1	
12	"Thinking Out Loud"	Ed Sheeran	3 (Note: Reached number 1 in 2014)	917,000
13	"Sugar"	Maroon 5	7	
14	"Hold My Hand"	Jess Glynne	1	876,000
15	"Where Are Ü Now"	Jack Ü & Justin Bieber	3	874,000
16	"Want to Want Me"	Jason Derulo	1	
17	"Are You with Me"	Lost Frequencies	1	
18	"FourFiveSeconds"	Rihanna, Kanye West & Paul McCartney	3	
19	"Shut Up + Dance"	Walk the Moon	4	
20	"How Deep Is Your Love"	Calvin Harris & Disciples	2	
21	"Can't Feel My Face"	The Weeknd	3	778,000
22	"Firestone"	Kygo featuring Conrad Sewell	8	
23	"Trap Queen"	Fetty Wap	8	
24	"Love Yourself"	Justin Bieber	1	719,000
25	"The Hills"	The Weeknd	3	600,000
26	"Earned It"	The Weeknd	4	
27	"Black Magic"	Little Mix	1	600,000
28	"Wish You Were Mine"	Philip George	2	600,000
29	"Photograph"	Ed Sheeran	15	
30	"The Nights"	Avicii	6	
31	"Runaway (U & I)"	Galantis	4	
32	"Elastic Heart"	Sia	10	
33	"Bloodstream"	Ed Sheeran & Rudimental	2	
34	"Marvin Gaye"	Charlie Puth featuring Meghan Trainor	1	
35	"Up"	Olly Murs featuring Demi Lovato	4	
36	"Not Letting Go"	Tinie Tempah featuring Jess Glynne	1	
37	"Shine"	Years & Years	2	
38	"Ayo"	Chris Brown & Tyga	6	
39	"Don't Be So Hard on Yourself"	Jess Glynne	1	
40	"Hotline Bling"	Drake	3	
41	"Let It Go"	James Bay	10	
42	"Chandelier"	Sia	6	
43	"Jealous"	Nick Jonas	2	
44	"I Really Like You"	Carly Rae Jepsen	3	
45	"GDFR"	Flo Rida featuring Sage the Gemini & Lookas	3	
46	"Bills"	LunchMoney Lewis	2	
47	"Never Forget You"	MNEK & Zara Larsson	5	
48	"Drag Me Down"	One Direction	1	
49	"House Every Weekend"	David Zowie	1	
50	"Heroes (We Could Be)"	Alesso featuring Tove Lo	6	

=== Top albums of the year ===
This chart published by the Official Charts Company on 5 January 2016 shows combined sales for artist albums from sales and streams for the whole of 2015.

No.	Title	Artist	Peak position	Sales
1	25	Adele	1	2,496,000
2	x	Ed Sheeran	1	971,000
3	In the Lonely Hour	Sam Smith	1	893,000
4	If I Can Dream	Elvis Presley	1	881,000
5	Purpose	Justin Bieber	2	645,000
6	1989	Taylor Swift	2	
7	I Cry When I Laugh	Jess Glynne	1	583,000
8	Chaos and the Calm	James Bay	1	518,000
9	A Head Full of Dreams	Coldplay	2 (Note: Reached number 1 in 2016)	507,000
10	Wanted on Voyage	George Ezra	1	
11	Get Weird	Little Mix	2	389,000
12	Hozier	Hozier	3	
13	Never Been Better	Olly Murs	3 (Note: Reached number 1 in 2014)	
14	Made in the A.M.	One Direction	1	
15	Wilder Mind	Mumford & Sons	1	308,000
16	Another Country	Rod Stewart	2	300,000
17	Title	Meghan Trainor	1	
18	Alone in the Universe	Jeff Lynne's ELO	4	
19	How Big, How Blue, How Beautiful	Florence and the Machine	1	
20	Communion	Years & Years	1	260,000
21	Chasing Yesterday	Noel Gallagher's High Flying Birds	1	
22	Royal Blood	Royal Blood	3 (Note: Reached Number 1 in 2014)	
23	A Perfect Contradiction	Paloma Faith	5 (Note: Reached Number 2 in 2014)	
24	1000 Forms of Fear	Sia	5	
25	The Very Best of Cilla Black	Cilla Black	1	
26	Beauty Behind the Madness	The Weeknd	1	
27	The Ultimate Collection	Paul Simon	1	181,000
28	American Beauty/American Psycho	Fall Out Boy	2	
29	Dark Sky Island	Enya	4	
30	Drones	Muse	1	
31	Chapter One	Ella Henderson	7 (Note: Reached Number 1 in 2014)	
32	A Year of Songs	Alexander Armstrong	6	
33	III	Take That	11 (Note: Reached Number 1 in 2014)	
34	Delirium	Ellie Goulding	3	
35	Rattle That Lock	David Gilmour	1	
36	The Balcony	Catfish and the Bottlemen	18 (Note: Reached Number 10 in 2014)	
37	Liquid Spirit	Gregory Porter	9	
38	+	Ed Sheeran	9 (Note: Reached Number 1 in 2011)	
39	Keep the Village Alive	Stereophonics	1	
40	Christmas	Michael Bublé	12 (Note: Reached Number 1 in 2011)	
41	Cinema	Andrea Bocelli	3	
42	1	The Beatles	5 (Note: Reached Number 1 in 2000)	
43	The Very Best of Fleetwood Mac	Fleetwood Mac	7 (Note: Reached Number 6 in 2009)	
44	Motion	Calvin Harris	8 (Note: Reached Number 2 in 2014)	
45	21	Adele	11 (Note: Reached Number 1 in 2011)	
46	The Definitive Collection	Lionel Richie	1	
47	V	Maroon 5	13 (Note: Reached Number 4 in 2014)	
48	Smoke + Mirrors	Imagine Dragons	1	
49	If You're Reading This It's Too Late	Drake	3	
50	Four	One Direction	7 (Note: Reached Number 1 in 2014)	

== Deaths ==
- 1 January – Matthew Cogley, musician and songwriter (Failsafe), 30
- 6 January – Lance Percival, actor and singer, 81
- 22 January – Joan Hinde, trumpet player, 81
- 27 January – Margot Moir, Scottish-born Australian singer (The Moir Sisters), 55
- 29 January – Danny McCulloch, 69, bassist (Eric Burdon & The Animals)
- 12 February – Steve Strange, singer (Visage), 55 (heart attack)
- 13 February – John McCabe, British composer and pianist, 75
- 16 February – Gavin Clark, British songwriter and singer with the bands Sunhouse, Clayhill and U.N.K.L.E, 46
- 22 February – Chris Rainbow, rock singer and musician (The Alan Parsons Project), 68
- 16 March – Andy Fraser, composer and bassist (Free), 62
- 21 March – Jackie Trent, singer-songwriter and actress, 74
- 23 March
  - Roy Douglas, composer, 107
  - Lil Chris, singer-songwriter, musician, 24
- 26 March – John Renbourn, guitarist and songwriter (Pentangle), 70
- 28 March
  - Josie Jones, singer (The Mighty Wah!) (death announced on this date)
  - Ronald Stevenson, composer and pianist, 87
- 1 April – Dave Ball, musician (Procol Harum), 65
- 3 April – Andrew Porter, organist, music critic, and opera director, 86
- 10 April – Ronald Hambleton, English-born Canadian broadcaster and music critic (Toronto Star), 97
- 13 April – Ronnie Carroll, Northern Irish singer, 80
- 17 April – Brian Couzens, music industry executive (Chandos Records), 86
- 6 May – Errol Brown, Jamaican-born British singer (Hot Chocolate), 71
- 15 May – Ross Dawson, English drummer (Late of the Pier)
- 16 May – Flora MacNeil, Scottish Gaelic singer, 86
- 21 May – Twinkle, British singer-songwriter, 66 (cancer)
- 28 May – Johnny Keating, Scottish musician, songwriter and arranger, 87
- 4 June – Allan Fryer, Scottish-born Australian musician (Heaven), 60 (cancer)
- 5 June – Nick Marsh, singer and musician (Flesh for Lulu), 53 (cancer)
- 12 June – Ernest Tomlinson, composer, 90
- 27 June – Chris Squire, bassist (Yes), 67 (acute erythroid leukemia)
- 29 June – Bruce Rowland, drummer (Fairport Convention), 74
- 1 July
  - Val Doonican, Irish-born singer, 88
  - Edward Greenfield, music critic and broadcaster, 86
- 13 July – Eric Wrixon (Them, Thin Lizzy), 68
- 22 July – Eddie Hardin, singer-songwriter and pianist (The Spencer Davis Group and Axis Point), 66
- 1 August – Cilla Black, singer and presenter, 72
- 12 August – John Scott, organist and choirmaster, 59
- 14 August – Jazz Summers, music manager (Scissor Sisters, The Verve, Snow Patrol), 71 (lung cancer)
- 8 October – Jim Diamond, Scottish singer, songwriter, 64
- 11 October – Carey Lander, keyboardist, singer (Camera Obscura), 33
- 13 October – Duncan Druce, English composer and musicologist, 76
- 28 October – Diane Charlemagne, singer (52nd Street, Urban Cookie Collective), 51 (cancer)
- 9 November – Andy White, Scottish musician, drummer, 85
- 11 November – Phil "Philthy Animal" Taylor, drummer (Motörhead), 61
- 28 November – Wayne Bickerton, songwriter, record producer, and music executive, 74
- 17 December – Mick Lynch, Irish singer, musician (Stump), 56 (cancer)
- 28 December
  - John Bradbury, drummer (The Specials), 62
  - Guru Josh, techno producer, musician, 51 (suicide)
  - Ian "Lemmy" Kilmister, singer, songwriter, musician (Motörhead, Hawkwind), 70 (cancer)

== See also ==
- 2015 in British radio
- 2015 in British television
- 2015 in the United Kingdom
- List of British films of 2015
