= Birmingham Contemporary Music Group =

British chamber ensemble

Birmingham Contemporary Music Group (BCMG) is a British chamber ensemble based in Birmingham, England specialising in the performance of new and contemporary music. BCMG performs regularly at the CBSO Centre and Symphony Hall in Birmingham, tours nationally and worldwide and has appeared several times at the Proms in London.

Musicians from the City of Birmingham Symphony Orchestra formed the ensemble in 1987, with Simon Rattle as its founding patron. Since then BCMG has premiered over 150 new works and won numerous awards, including the 2004 Royal Philharmonic Society Audience Development Award, the 1995 Gramophone Award for Best Orchestral Recording, the 1993 Royal Philharmonic Society Chamber Ensemble Award, the 1993 Prudential Award for Music, and The Arts Ball 2002 Outstanding Achievement Award.

Thomas Adès was the first music director of BCMG, from 1998 to 2000. The current artistic director of BCMG is Stephan Meier, who succeeded Stephen Newbould (artistic director 2001-2016). John Woolrich and Oliver Knussen were artists-in-association with BCMG.

Past chairs of BCMG have included Stephen Saltaire, who served in the post from 2000 to 2015. In December 2015, BCMG announced the appointment of Christoph Trestler as its new chair.

== Sound Investment ==
The Sound Investment scheme is a partnership between BCMG, the composers whom it commissions to write new pieces and BCMG's audience. Members of the public are invited to "invest" in a new commission by paying a sum of money, currently £150, to purchase Sound Investment Units in the new work and so contribute to the costs involved in commissioning new pieces. For each commissioned piece, a certain number of Units are available, typically 30-50. Sound Investors are kept informed about "their" work's progress and are invited to attend rehearsals, as well as the first public performance. They are also able to purchase either a signed copy of the score or receive a signed copy of the score's title page. Composer Colin Matthews, who has had four works commissioned by BCMG, has called the Sound Investors "a remarkable group...although the only return on their investment is a signed copy of the score.

== Composers and works commissioned ==
(The year shown is the year of first performance)

- 1990: Simon Holt: "Lilith"
- 1992: Geoffrey Poole: The Magnification of the Virgin
- 1992: David Lang: My Evil Twin
- 1993: Elena Firsova: Distance
- 1993: David Sawer: The Memory of Water
- 1994: Detlev Muller-Siemens: Phoenix
- 1994: Errollyn Wallen: Are you worried...?
- 1994: Colin Matthews: ...through the glass
- 1995: Philip Cashian: Chamber Concerto
- 1995: Aaron Jay Kernis: Goblin Market
- 1995: Judith Weir: Musicians Wrestle Everywhere
- 1996: Sally Beamish: A Book of Seasons
- 1996: Osvaldo Golijov: Last Round
- 1996: Howard Skempton: Delicate
- 1997: Thomas Adès: Concerto Conciso
- 1997: Peter-Paul Nash: Symphony No. 2
- 1997: Gerard McBurney: Desire
- 1998: Simon Bainbridge: Guitar Concerto
- 1998: David Lang: The Passing Measures
- 1999: Alastair Greig: Play
- 1999: Bent Sørensen: Sinful Songs
- 1999: Stuart MacRae: Portrait
- 1999: Kenneth Hesketh: The Circling Canopy of Night
- 2000: Gerald Barry: Wiener Blut
- 2000: Colin Matthews: Continuum
- 2000: Thea Musgrave: Lamenting with Ariadne
- 2000: John Woolrich: Bitter Fruit
- 2001: Poul Ruders: ABYSM
- 2001: Edward Rushton: Palace
- 2002: Gerald Barry: Dead March
- 2002: Marc-André Dalbavie: Palimpseste
- 2002: Mark-Anthony Turnage: The Torn Fields
- 2002: Simon Holt: Boots of Lead
- 2003: Param Vir: The Theatre of Magical Beings
- 2004: Philip Cashian: Three Pieces
- 2004: Michael Wolters: Neighbours for a Night
- 2005: Julian Anderson: Book of Hours
- 2005: Huw Watkins: Rondo
- 2005: Judith Weir: Psyche and Manimekelai
- 2005: Howard Skempton: Ben Somewhen
- 2006: Philip Cashian: Skein
- 2006: Morgan Hayes: Violin Concerto
- 2006: Dave Douglas: Blue Latitudes
- 2007: John Woolrich: Going a Journey
- 2007: Tansy Davies: Falling Angel
- 2007: Elvind Buene: Garland (for Matthew Locke)
- 2007: Brett Dean: Wolf-Lieder
- 2007: Johannes Maria Staud: One Movement and Five Miniatures
- 2007: Nicholas Sackman: Concerto in Black
- 2008: Gerald Barry: Beethoven
- 2008: Luke Bedford: Good Dream She Has
- 2008: Kevin Volans: The Partenheimer Project
- 2009: Francesco Antonioni: Ballata
- 2009: Helen Grime: A Cold Spring
- 2009: Simon Holt: Capriccio Spettrale
- 2009: Richard Causton: Chamber Symphony
- 2009: Vic Hoyland: Hey Presto!... moon - flower - bat
- 2009: David Sawer: Rumpelstiltskin
- 2010: Charlie Usher: Slow Pan
- 2010: Michael Wolters: I see with my eyes closed
- 2011: Jo Kondo: Three Songs Tennyson Sung
- 2011: Dominic Muldowney: Six Cabaret Songs
- 2011: Silvina Milstein: de oro y sombra ...
- 2012: Tansy Davies: Nature
- 2012: Alexander Goehr: To These Dark Steps / The Fathers are Watching
- 2012: John Woolrich: The Mustering Drum
- 2013: Richard Baker: The Tyranny of Fun
- 2013: David Sawer: Rumpelstiltskin Suite
- 2013: David Sawer: The Lighthouse Keepers
- 2014: David Lang: Crowd Out
- 2014: Param Vir: Raga Fields
- 2015: Ivo Nilsson: Rapidità
- 2015: Gerald Barry: The Importance of Being Earnest
- 2015: Melinda Maxwell: FRACTURES: Monk Unpacked
- 2016: Edmund Finnis: Parallel Colour
- 2016: Michael Zev Gordon: Seize the Day
- 2016: Benedict Mason: Horns Strings and Harmony
- 2016: Richard Baker: Hwyl fawr ffrindiau
- 2016: John Woolrich: Swansong
- 2016: Luke Bedford: In Black Bright Ink
- 2016: Zoë Martlew: Broad St. Burlesque
- 2017: Helen Grime: Piano Concerto
