= Piano Concerto (Grime) =

Helen Grime's Piano Concerto was written for the between 2016 and 2017 on a joint commission from Wigmore Hall and the Birmingham Contemporary Music Group. Its world premiere was given by the pianist Huw Watkins, Grime's husband, and members of the Birmingham Contemporary Music Group at Wigmore Hall, London, on 3 March 2017.

== Composition ==
The concerto lasts about 12 minutes and is cast in three short, numbered movements. Unlike other piano concertos, which are typically cast for piano and orchestra, Grime's concerto is scored much more sparingly for piano and a chamber ensemble of only 6 players. In the score program note, Grime said that her intention "was to create an intimate piece which is as much about chamber music as moments of great virtuosity and stillness." The concerto was also written in part as a homage to the music of Elliott Carter and Pierre Boulez, with Grime citing Carter's Triple Duo (1982) and Boulez's Sur Incises (1996/1998) as personal favorites.

=== Instrumentation ===
The work is scored for solo piano and a chamber ensemble comprising flute (doubling alto flute), clarinet (doubling bass clarinet), one percussionist (playing vibraphone, crotales, and large suspended cymbal), harp, violin, and cello.

== Reception ==
Reviewing the world premiere, Erica Jeal of The Guardian called the concerto "a compact work of glittering sonorities carefully applied, with a hectic finale that explodes and then vanishes into thin air." Jeal questioned the classification of the piece as a piano concerto, however, adding, "While it certainly demands virtuosic display from the pianist – something Watkins supplied with assurance – the focus is shared between all seven players. Really it's a delicately wrought chamber piece." Despite this, she nevertheless concluded, "the Piano Concerto is a demonstration of Grime's ability to create dense and fascinating textures with the utmost economy." Hannah Nepil of the Financial Times similarly said the writing was "as much maths as music," but that "it also imbues every instrument with personality."
