= Adina Izarra =

Venezuelan musician

Adina Izarra (born 1959) is a Venezuelan musician, music educator and composer.

== Biography ==
Adina Izarra was born in Caracas, Venezuela. She studied music under Alfredo del Mónaco in Caracas and received her Ph.D. in composition from York University, England, in 1988, after studying with Vic Hoyland.

After 1988 Izarra returned to Caracas where she took a position as professor of composition at Simón Bolívar University. Between 1999 and 2001, she was a member of the executive committee of the International Society for Contemporary Music (ISCM). Currently residing in Guayaquil, Ecuador, where she is a professor at the University of the Arts. She works in the areas of live electronics and audio-reactive visuals.

She has a duet with Rubén Riera, who plays ancient and contemporary plucked string instruments, with whom she performs original improvisations, works by both, as well as covers a lot of old music, transformed through electronics.

Adina has just received a Master's degree in Digital Audiovisual Postproduction from ESPOL, Guayaquil and has a PhD in composition from the University of York, England.Currently residing in Guayaquil, Ecuador, working as a professor at the University of the Arts. She works in the areas of live electronics and audio-reactive visuals.

== Works ==
- 10 ° 29 'N. Acousmatic, 2007
- All my life I loved hos, video, 2006
- Vihuela for Vihuela, electronic collaboration with Rubén Riera, 2005
- Third Aria for Oboe, Clarinet and Bassoon, 2004
- 3c Aria for flute, bassoon and guitar, 2004
- The Earth is our home, for string quartet, 2004
- In Visée, MP3 to Theorbo and Laptop, 2004 videos
- Caucus, for piano solo, 2003
- Two Medieval Miniatures, for clarinet in Bb and piano, 2003, short for guitar and string quartet, 2003
- Folias of Spain, for harp alone, 2002
- Guacaipuro, 2000. Opera for old instruments, chamber orchestra, chorus and soloists.
- Three Short version for piano and flute, 2001
- A Two MP3 Flute and Guitar. 1991
- Two Movements for Quintet. 1991 Guitar and String Quartet National Award 1990
- Guitar Concerto, 1991 Guitar and Chamber Orchestra
- Tribute, 1991 Chamber Orchestra National Award, 1991
- Luvina, 1992 Bass Flute and Delay
- The Grinder, Flute Alone 1992
- Incidental music for Euripides' TROJAN, 1993 Municipal Theatre Award 1994
- Reeds, Single Flute 1994 Edited by Funves Caracas 1996, Analysis of the work by A. Izarra (1996)
- Folias of Spain, Guitar Sola 1995 Commission Mavesa SA, Caracas
- Landini cadence Study, 1996 Piano Solo
- Profane Oratorio, 1997 Sop, barite., Flute, Harp, Guitar and percussion. Custom USB, Caracas
- Portraits of Macondo, 1997 Clarinet, Bassoon and Piano Commissioned by Trio Neos (Mexico)
- Concert Harp, 1997 Harp and Chamber Orchestra Commissioned Caracas Telda
- Three short films: 1st short, short slow, the 2nd short 1998 Flute & Guitar
- Oshunmare, 1982 Concerto for Violin and Orchestra Commissioned by University of York, England
- Watch, 1983 Two pianists and narrator National Composition Prize 1984
- Arpilleras Weaver Magic Orchestra, 1985 National Award 1985
- Plumismo Flute, Piccolo 1986 Published by Equinox single, USB, Caracas
- Sulphuratus Pitangus 1987 Concerto for Flute and Strings
- Vojm 1988 Voice and Electronic Equipment
- Through some Transparencies Alone 1989 Harp
- 1989 Margarita Soprano, Guitar and Flute
- 1989 Margarita Mezzo, Flute, Harp, Oboe, Keyboards and Bass.
- Silences, 1989 Single Guitar Edited by Funves Caracas 1990
- Reverón, 1989 Flute, Oboe and Bass
- Querrequerre, 1989 Two piccolos or Piccolo and Oboe
- From a window with Parrots, Guitar Sola 1989
