= Virga (disambiguation) =

A virga is an observable streak or shaft of precipitation.

Virga may also refer to:

- Virga (butterfly), genus of butterflies
- Virga parish, parish in Priekule municipality, Latvia
- The Virga series, a science fiction series by Karl Schroeder
- Virga, an orchestral composition by Helen Grime
- Virga Jesse Basilica, church in Belgium
- An obsolete unit of length, proposed by Gabriel Mouton

== People with the surname ==
- Valerio Virga (born 1986), Italian footballer
- Vincenzo Virga (born 1936), Italian mob boss

== See also ==
- Virgo (disambiguation)
- Viagra
