= Clarinet Concerto (Grime) =

Composition for clarinet by Helen Grime

Helen Grime's Clarinet Concerto was composed in 2009 on a commission from the Tanglewood Music Center. Its world premiere was given by the clarinetist Brent Besner and Fellows of the Tanglewood Music Center at the Tanglewood Music Festival on 9 August 2010.

== Composition ==
The concerto lasts about 16 minutes and is cast in three numbered movements. In the score program note, Grime noted that the music was inspired in part by the poem "The Cracked Bell" by the French poet Charles Baudelaire.

=== Instrumentation ===
The work is scored for solo clarinet and a chamber orchestra comprising a flute (doubling piccolo), bassoon (doubling contrabassoon), horn, trumpet, trombone, harp, and strings (one each).

== Reception ==
The clarinet concerto has been generally praised by music critics. Reviewing the world premiere, Allan Kozinn of The New York Times wrote that Grime "seems drawn to melody and textural luxuriance, but she also has an ear for counterpoint and rhythmic complexity that gives her music an appealing edge." He added, "The concerto's most entrancing section is a clarinet cadenza in which a combination of trills and sustained tones creates the illusion of several clarinet lines intertwined." George Hall of The Guardian similarly lauded "Grime's ability to allot each instrument its own individuality," remarking, "Once again, the music's ability to sustain interest was as notable as the sometimes lyrical, sometimes abrasive gestures Grime deploys as building blocks of a tight structure."

Ivan Hewett of The Daily Telegraph favorably noted stylistic echoes of the French composer Pierre Boulez, writing, "Flurries of nervously intense melody from the soloist were caught and held in a web of trilling sounds in the string quartet, with muted trombone and thrummed harp adding a touch of menace." Likewise, Anthony Tommasini, reviewing a later concert for The New York Times, called it "a compact and engagingly mercurial work, which alternates passages of lacy, searching lyrical writing with stretches of jumpy animation."

== Recording ==
A recording of the concerto, performed by the clarinetist Lynsey Marsh and members of The Hallé, was released on album together with several other Grime compositions through NMC Recordings on 22 September 2014.
