= Luke Bedford =

British composer (born 1978)

Luke Bedford (born 25 April 1978) is a British composer.

He studied composition with Edwin Roxburgh and Simon Bainbridge at the Royal College of Music, and won the Mendelssohn Scholarship in 2000. This was followed by post-graduate study with Simon Bainbridge at the Royal Academy of Music. In 2007 Bedford signed to Universal Edition London.

Awards include the 2000 Royal Philharmonic Society Composition Prize for composers under 29 and the 2004 BBC Radio 3 Listeners' Award at the British Composer Awards. In 2007, Bedford became the first compositional recipient of a Paul Hamlyn Artists' Award since David Sawer in 1993. 2007 also saw him receive a nomination for the Royal Philharmonic Society large-scale composition prize, for his song cycle On Voit Tout En Aventure. In 2008, Bedford received his second British Composer Award for his 2007 orchestral work Wreathe. In 2012, he was awarded the Ernst von Siemens Composer Prize.

Bedford was the Wigmore Hall's first ever Composer-in-Residence, from 2008-2011.

In 2015 his work for large orchestra, Instability, was premiered at the Proms, and in October 2017 his Concerto for Saxophone Quartet & Orchestra had its premiere at the Berlin Philharmonie.

Bedford has written two operas: Seven Angels with librettist Glyn Maxwell, and Through His Teeth with David Harrower. Both have received multiple performances both in the UK and Germany. In 2018 Bastille Musique released a studio recording of Through His Teeth, performed by Opera Factory Freiburg.

Bedford received an Ivor Novello Award nomination at The Ivors Classical Awards 2023. Staggard Nocturne, for 14 players and percussion soloist was nominated for Best Chamber Ensemble Composition.

Luke is married with two children and lives in Shrewsbury where he used to play cricket.

== Selected works ==
Stage

- Seven Angels, Chamber Opera in 2 acts for 7 singers and 12 instruments (2009–2011)
- Through His Teeth, Opera in 1 act for 3 singers and 8 musician (2013)

Orchestral

- Rode with Darkness (2003)
- Outblaze the Sky (2007)
- Wreathe (2007)
- Più Mosso for large orchestra (2009)
- Instability (2015)
- Concerto for saxophone Quartet and orchestra (2017)

Concertante

- Wonderful Two-Headed Nightingale for violin solo, viola solo and 15 players (2011)

Ensemble

- Five Abstracts for 14 players (2000–2001)
- Catafalque for large ensemble (2002)
- Man Shoots Strangers from Skyscraper for 8 players (2002)
- Slow Music for 8 players (2005)
- Or Voit Tout En Aventure for soprano and 16 players (2006)
- By the Screen in the Sun at the Hill on the Gold for 18 players (2008)
- Self-Assembly Composition No. 1 for any instruments (2009)

Chamber and instrumental music

- Chiaroscuro for violin, cello and piano (2002–2005)
- Of the Air for string quartet (2008–2009)
- Great Bass Rackett for solo bassoon (2009)
- Faraway Canons for piano and bass drum (2018)

Piano

- Catafalque (2002)

Vocal

- Good Dream She Has for soprano, mezzo-soprano, tenor and chamber ensemble (2007)
- On Time for choir and orchestra (2008)
- Upon St. George's Hill for tenor and guitar (2008)
