= Michael Wolters =

British composer of German origin (born 1971)

Michael Wolters is a British composer of German origin. He was born in 1971 in Mönchengladbach, Germany, grew up in Niederkrüchten, a small German village on the Dutch border and now lives in Birmingham, UK. After working as a care worker in a children's home and a runner at several theatres in Germany and Scarborough he studied Applied Theatre Studies at Justus-Liebig-Universität Giessen, Germany and Composition and Theatre Studies at the University of Huddersfield (BA, MA) and finally received his PhD in Composition from the University of Birmingham in 2003. His composition teachers include Christopher Fox, Heiner Goebbels, Patric Standford and Vic Hoyland. Since 2009 he has been Deputy Head of Composition at Birmingham Conservatoire. He is a founder member of the artists' collective New Guide to Opera.

== Aesthetic outlook ==
Wolters has maintained an outsider position in the world of contemporary music with works which deconstruct and question the traditional concert situation or which are designed for performance outside the concert hall. He has written music for traditional ensembles like Birmingham Contemporary Music Group (Journal, Neighbours for a Night and I see with my eyes closed) but prefers not to be confined by conventional set-ups and concert rituals. This has resulted in pieces with unusual instrumentations (His 2012 twelve-minute-long opera The Voyage in collaboration with Birmingham-based theatre company Stan's Cafe, for example, is written for mezzo-soprano, eleven recorders and double bass ), performances in unusual places (wahnsinnig wichtig on ice [with New Guide to Opera] took place on and around an ice rink) or projects of unusual duration (his Spring Symphony: The Joy of Life is the shortest symphony in the world and lasts around 17 seconds and the performance of Wir sehen uns morgen wieder [with New Guide to Opera] lasted for one month). He strongly believes that the idea and the concept of a work are the crucial elements to create a successful piece of art. There is no place for musical or other material that doesn't serve the idea. His work focuses on many of the principles highlighted in Sol LeWitt's Sentences on Conceptual Art. One of the major influences on his music was the work of American performance artist Laurie Anderson in the 1980s. He especially admires Anderson's ability to use multiple artistic genres to create highly effective and moving performance situations, where – in her typical postmodern way – she tells stories while highlighting the fact that she is telling stories.

== Reactions ==
Wolters' constant refusal to conform to conventional concert practice has led to mixed receptions in the international press. The Telegraph called his Neighbours for a Night "a piece that stood all the norms of 'new music' on their head". In the performance "the audience was invited to sing a deathless melody", which left the Guardian reviewer Andrew Clements baffled. Clements' unfavourable review of this piece highlights how Wolters' work sits purposefully uncomfortably within the Western concert tradition. In contrast, Charlotte Higgins, the Guardian's chief arts writer called I see with my eyes closed, his first collaboration with Theatre Company Stan's Cafe, "fascinating, oddly moving territory". American Recorder called his radio play Kathryn und Peter durchqueren die Antarktis an "impressive achievement in the world of music/theater/performance" while Stephen Graham's acknowledges the absurdity of Wolters' "postmodern folk theatre" German Folk Tunes, but also finds it "a little too self-conscious and obvious in its satire".

== Works ==
Wolters works have been performed in Europe, Russia, New Zealand, USA and Canada. His music for Danserye, a dance project in collaboration with the German choreographer Sebastian Matthias, toured Germany, Switzerland, Belgium and the Netherlands in 2013. His opera The Voyage was commission by the PRS Foundation for the 2012 Cultural Olympiad.

=== Selected works ===
- Danserye (2013) music for dance, recorder, clarinet, violin, guitar
- The Voyage (2012) for voice, eleven recorders and double bass
- Monsterwalzer (2002/2012) for 11 strings/9 flutes, cello and double bass
- Deutsche Volksweisen (German Folk Tunes)
- The Lady plays Rachmaninov (2007) for decibel
- Concerto Grosso (2006) for Orkest de Volharding
- The Bridegroom (2004) opera after Pushkin
- Spring Symphony: The Joy of Life (2002) for orchestra
- BRAHMS (2002) for large orchestra
- Journal (2001) for large ensemble
- Symphony No 1 "Concerto for Orchestra" (1999) for orchestra
- HandBAG-Music (1997) for ensemble

=== With New Guide to Opera ===
- wahnsinning wichtig: on ice (2012) music theatre
- Wir sehen uns morgen wieder (2009) multi media project
- Grosse Mengen Bach (2008) music theatre
- BBC4 World News Today (2008) music theatre
- The End of the Gulf Stream (2006) music theatre
- Kathryn und Peter durchqueren die Antarktis (2005) music theatre
- The American Penis (2005) music theatre
