= Percussion Concerto (Grime) =

Concerto by Helen Grime

The Percussion Concerto is a composition for solo percussion and orchestra by the Scottish composer Helen Grime. The work was commissioned by the Southbank Centre, the Baltimore Symphony Orchestra, and the Swedish Chamber Orchestra. It was first performed by the percussionist Colin Currie and the London Philharmonic Orchestra conducted by Marin Alsop at the Royal Festival Hall, London, on 16 January 2019.

== Composition ==
The composition is cast in a single movement divided into three sections. It has a performance duration of approximately 23 minutes.

== Instrumentation ==
The work is scored for a solo percussionist and an orchestra consisting of two flutes (2nd doubling piccolo), two oboes (2nd doubling cor anglais), two clarinets (2nd doubling E-flat clarinet), two bassoons (2nd doubling contrabassoon), two horns, two trumpets, harp, celesta, and strings. The percussion battery consists of vibraphone, glockenspiel, marimba, crotales, cowbells, bass drum, tom tom, conga, two bongo drums, suspended cymbal, two brake drums, four woodblocks, and high metal pipe.

== Reception ==
Reviewing the world premiere, Richard Fairman of the Financial Times wrote that "the premiere of Helen Grime's Percussion Concerto [...] imagined an orchestral kaleidoscope of flickering lights and perfectly judged timbres," adding, "For her and the LPO this must have been an evening of hard work, but it paid dividends."

Conversely, Andrew Clements of The Guardian described the piece as "seem[ing] rather formulaic." Patrick Rucker of The Washington Post was also critical of the piece, observing, "The orchestration was carefully balanced, so when Currie's solos were accompanied at all, it was usually quietly. Yet Grime didn't exploit two dynamic elements of the concerto form: dialogue between soloist and orchestra, and the dramatic potential of the individual juxtaposed against the crowd. Also curious for a percussion concerto was the absence of strong rhythmic character." He concluded, "Lucky is the soloist who has conductor Alsop as an ultrasensitive concerto partner, but despite her and her musicians' best efforts, Grime's Percussion Concerto came off as unimpressively bland."
