= Edwin Roxburgh =

English composer, conductor and oboist

Edwin Roxburgh (born 6 November 1937) is an English composer, conductor and oboist.

Roxburgh was born in Liverpool. After playing oboe in the National Youth Orchestra, he won a double scholarship to study composition with Herbert Howells and oboe with Terence MacDonagh at the Royal College of Music. He also studied composition with Nadia Boulanger in Paris and Luigi Dallapiccola in Florence. Boulanger once described him as "the new Stravinsky".

After his studies he became principal oboist of the Sadler's Wells Opera, and as a virtuoso soloist he gave the UK premieres of Luciano Berio’s Sequenza VII and Heinz Holliger’s Cardiophonie. Together with Léon Goossens he wrote the Menuhin Music Guide for the oboe in 1977. He also played with the Menuhin Festival Orchestra.

Roxburgh taught composition and conducting at the Royal College of Music, where he founded the RCM's Twentieth Century Ensemble. In 2004 he became the acting Head of Composition at the Birmingham Conservatoire and from 2005 has acted as visiting tutor in composition and conducting, as well as workshop leader. Among his students are Luke Bedford, Dai Fujikura, Daniel Giorgetti, Helen Grime, Kenneth Hesketh, Rolf Hind, Jonathan Lloyd, Roger Redgate and David Warburton.

In 2007 his 70th birthday was celebrated in a series of concert performances showcasing a selection of his works. He is Associate Composer of the London Festival Orchestra.

== Music ==
The orchestral piece Montage was premiered at the BBC Proms in 1977. His Clarinet Concerto (1995), structured as a 30 minute single movement, and the nine movement orchestral work Saturn from 1982 (a tribute to Holst, depicting each of the planet’s nine satellites) have been recorded. The 2006 Oboe Concerto, An Elegy for Ur, won a British Academy Award, while the Concerto for Orchestra (2008) was the recipient of a Royal Philharmonic Society bursary. A Concerto for Piano and Wind Orchestra was premiered on 30 March 2017 to celebrate the composer's 80th birthday, and there are other works for wind band such as Time’s Harvest (2000) and Aeolian Carillons (2006).

Roxburgh has contributed significantly to the chamber music repertoire of his own instrument, the oboe. He composed Aulodie (1977) and Antares (1988) to mark the 80th and 90th birthdays of Léon Goossens, while Elegy (1982) was dedicated the memory of Janet Craxton. Christopher Redgate has recorded a disc of chamber music for the oboe. A CD of his piano music issued in 2007 includes the substantial, single movement Piano Sonata of 1993, (derived from a three note motif by Alban Berg) and the "freely atonal" Six Etudes (1980).

His 2003 opera Abelard has been published but awaits a full staging. A newer opera, Her War, for soprano and trumpet with words by Jonathan Ruffle, was premiered by soprano April Fredrick and trumpeter Simon Desbruslais in London in September 2020.
