= Near Midnight =

Orchestral work by Helen Grime

Near Midnight is an orchestral composition written in 2012 by the Scottish composer Helen Grime. It was commissioned by The Hallé as the first piece written during Grime's tenure as the ensemble's Associate Composer. Its world premiere was given by the Hallé Orchestra conducted by Sir Mark Elder at Bridgewater Hall on 23 May 2013.

== Composition ==
Near Midnight has a duration of about 12 minutes and is cast in one movement spanning four connected sections. The composition was partially inspired by a poem by D. H. Lawrence "Week-night Service," about which Grime wrote in the score program note, "Its melancholic undertones, images of tolling bells, high-spun moon and the indifference of night, immediately struck a chord with me. Throughout the piece fanfare-like brass passages act almost like the tolling of bells, sometimes distant but often insistent and clangourous, these episodes act as important markers in the structure of the piece."

=== Instrumentation ===
The work is scored for a large orchestra comprising three flutes (3rd doubling piccolo), two oboes, cor anglais, three clarinets (2nd doubling E-flat clarinet; 3rd doubling 2nd bass clarinet), bass clarinet, two bassoons, contrabassoon, four horns, three trumpets, three trombones, bass trombone, tuba, timpani, three percussionists, celesta, harp, and strings.

== Reception ==
Fiona Maddocks of The Guardian praised Near Midnight, among other Grime compositions, remarking, "The writing is finely textured, dense but airy, ornamental but never decorative." Catherine Reese Newton of the Utah Arts Review also praised the piece, writing, "The prevailing mood was reflective and melancholy, but Near Midnight doesn't depict a silent night; clear woodwinds and rustling strings suggested the stirring of birds and other creatures, and periodic brass outbursts depicted the tolling of bells."

However, Edward Seckerson of The Arts Desk was more critical of the music, writing that "nothing about it sounded at all new or even challenging." He added, "She orchestrates with the sharpness and precision befitting great ears but the total effect here was of a latter-day Firebird, exotic and fantastical but in the end merely cosmetic."
