= Meditations on Joy =

Orchestral work by Helen Grime

Meditations on Joy is a composition for orchestra written in 2019 by the Scottish composer Helen Grime. The work was jointly commissioned by the BBC, the Deutsches Symphonie-Orchester Berlin, and the Los Angeles Philharmonic. Its world premiere was given by the Los Angeles Philharmonic conducted by Otto Tausk at the Walt Disney Concert Hall on 23 February 2023.

== Composition ==
Meditations on Joy has a duration of roughly 15 minutes and is cast in three numbered movements. In the score program note, Grime described the piece, saying, "This piece is an exploration of joy in its many different forms, from a personal perspective. The act of composing, although often a huge challenge, can occasionally elicit the most intense feeling of joy, and that is something that I wanted to pervade the whole piece. This is contrasted by much darker music, the one often coming out of the other quite unexpectedly."

=== Instrumentation ===
The work is scored for a large orchestra comprising three flutes (doubling piccolo and alto flute), two oboes, Cor anglais, three clarinets, two bassoons, contrabassoon, four horns, three trumpets, two trombones, bass trombone, tuba, timpani, four percussionists, celesta, harp, and strings.

== Reception ==
Rupert Christiansen of The Daily Telegraph praised Meditations on Joy, writing, "Three short movements travel from passages of muffled intensity, interrupted by a triumphant thunderclap, to a light-touch Scherzo and an ascent into celestial realms, graced with cascades of woodwind, and concluding in something like a lullaby, its harmonies unresolved." He added, "It's a richly atmospheric and delicately coloured piece – Debussy a presence in its hinterland – that should be heard again."

Geoff Brown of The Times was more critical of the piece, however, opining that there was "not much" joy in the music. He elaborated, "Joy of sorts arrived with clattering staccato outbursts for brass and percussion and swirling woodwinds, but the most lingering mood of this three-movement, 15-minute creation was contemplative and coloured light grey."
