= Two Eardley Pictures =

Orchestral work by Helen Grime

Two Eardley Pictures is a set of two orchestral compositions written in 2016 by the Scottish composer Helen Grime. It was inspired by two works by the British artist Joan Eardley, for which the music is named. The first piece "Catterline in Winter" was commissioned by the BBC and given its world premiere by the BBC Scottish Symphony Orchestra conducted by Thomas Dausgaard as part of the BBC Proms at the Royal Albert Hall, London, on 5 August 2016. The second piece "Snow" was commissioned by the National Youth Orchestra of Scotland and also given its premiere at the Proms by the National Youth Orchestra of Scotland conducted by Ilan Volkov on 7 August 2016. Two Earley Pictures won the prize for Large Scale Work at the 2017 Scottish Awards for New Music.

== Composition ==
Two Eardley Pictures lasts about 16 minutes in performance and is divided into "I. Catterline in Winter" and "II. Snow," which last around 8 minute each. The two pieces can be played together or as standalone works.

=== Background ===
In an interview with The Scotsman, Grime remarked, "I liked the idea [Eardley] was out in the open doing these paintings, persistently trying to get closer to what she was trying to achieve, to the extent that if the sky shifted, she'd move quickly to a fresh canvass to capture the fast changing light." The composer thus approached the two works as musical canvases created back-to-back, adding, "I was interested in using exactly the same base material for each piece, but hearing it in different ways.” Grime described "Catterline in Winter" as "darker and slower," where "Snow" is "brighter and faster." Despite their ordering, the composer perceives "Snow" as the opening of the two, reflecting, “It ends quite darkly, thus providing a natural link into Catterline."

Both pieces contain musical quotes from the traditional Scottish ballad "The Scranky Black Farmer." Despite this, she added, "I don't use it in a recognisable way – you only hear the full melody once. Instead, I've given it a rich, harmonic feel."

=== Instrumentation ===
The work is scored for a large orchestra comprising three flutes (3rd doubling piccolo in "Snow"), three oboes (3rd doubling Cor anglais), three clarinets (2nd doubling bass clarinet in "Catterline in Winter"; 3rd doubling E-flat clarinet), two bassoons, contrabassoon, four horns, three trumpets (1st doubling E-flat trumpet in "Catterline in Winter"), two trombones, bass trombone, tuba, three percussionists, harp, celesta, and strings.

== Reception ==
Both pieces have been praised by music critics. Reviewing the world premiere of "Catterline in Winter," The Scotsman wrote, "A smooth wash of sound as the low brass and woodwind growled a heterophonic chorale; skittery dashes of colour, and watercolour effects from the chimes: this was visually-evocative music, clean-textured and filled with light, the contrast between hard-edged brass and mellow strings setting up a constant tension." Reviewing a later performance of "Snow," the same publication wrote that it "proved a compelling synthesis of frenetic busyness and needle-sharp definition, its wildness warmly checked by languid swathes of folk melody."

Tim Ashley of The Guardian similarly described "Snow" as "attractively scored" and wrote, "It takes as its starting point 'The Scranky Black Farmer,' a traditional song from the same region, heard at the outset on the clarinets, then shuttled from instrument to instrument in a series of variations, which in turn form the effective landscape across which scurrying figurations and slowly shifting string chords suggest the flurries and drifts of snow."
