= Violin Concerto (Grime) =

Helen Grime's Violin Concerto was written between 2015 and 2016 on a commission from the Swedish Radio Symphony Orchestra. Its world premiere was performed by the violinist Malin Broman and the Swedish Radio Symphony Orchestra conducted by Daniel Harding at Berwald Hall, Stockholm, on 15 December 2016.

== Composition ==
The concerto has a duration of roughly 20 minutes and is cast in one continuous movement divided into three numbered sections connected by intermezzi.

=== Instrumentation ===
The work is scored for solo violin and an orchestra consisting of two flutes (2nd doubling piccolo), two oboes, two clarinets (2nd doubling E-flat clarinet), two bassoons (2nd doubling contrabassoon), two horns, two trumpets, two trombones, bass trombone, tuba, two percussionists, harp, celesta, and strings.

== Reception ==
The music journalist Jari Kallio praised the piece as "one of [Grime's] most compelling scores" and predicted that "the concerto is destined to become a repertory item." Fellow music journalist Colin Anderson similarly said that the work "makes an instant impression through energy and attack," describing it as "music that also holds the attention rewardingly." Chris King of The St. Louis American also praised the concerto, writing, "The soloist almost never rested and almost always played at a feverish pitch. Grime wrote only scraps of melody for the other instruments; the brass section played such short lines it was almost used for percussion, and when anyone other than the soloist played as many as 12 notes in a line, it felt like an event." He added that "the music is not ugly, only edgy, unsettled, and unsettling" and that it "ended on a gorgeous note of discord."
