= Woven Space =

2017 orchestral composition by Helen Grime

Woven Space is an orchestral composition written in 2017 by the Scottish composer Helen Grime. The work was commissioned by the Barbican Centre for Sir Simon Rattle and the London Symphony Orchestra, which first performed the piece conducted by Rattle on 19 April 2019. The piece was the recipient of the Large Scale New Work award at the 2019 Scottish Awards for New Music.

== Composition ==
Woven Space lasts about 22 minutes and is composed in three movements:

1. Fanfares
2. Woven Space
3. Course

The work's title comes from the name of a sculpture of woven willow twigs by the artist Laura Ellen Bacon, which served as a visual influence for the second and third movements. The first movement "Fanfares" was written as an optional standalone piece, which was given its world premiere ahead of the larger work in September 2017.

=== Instrumentation ===
The piece is scored for a large orchestra comprising four flutes (2nd doubling alto flute; 3rd and 4th doubling piccolo), two oboes, Cor anglais, three clarinets (2nd doubling E-flat clarinet; 3rd doubling bass clarinet), two bassoons, contrabassoon, four horns, three trumpets, two trombones, bass trombone, tuba, timpani, four percussionists, harp, celesta, and strings.

== Reception ==
Woven Space has been generally praised by music critics. Peter Quantrill of The Arts Desk wrote, "Helen Grime has composed astutely for her commissioned forces. This is Rattle's kind of new music, driven forward by, if not excessively reliant upon striding pedal points and skittering ostinato figures. The piece grows appreciably outwards from a slow, rocking branch of an idea planted at the opening of the central movement. Grime has never been one for protracted closures, and the thrust of Woven Space is abruptly cut off at its knees, though one suspects that the harmony has run its course to that very point with the kind of structural ingenuity and economy that would have raised a dry nod of approval from Haydn." Richard Morrison of The Times similarly observed, "The three movements are disparate in tempo and mood, but all convey tumultuous tussle – between contrasting instrumental textures and between themes. Grime increasingly has the confidence and technique to build these into longer movements that ebb and flow, and ebb again." Barry Millington of the Evening Standard also lauded the piece, saying, "the opening, incident-packed movement, Fanfares deploys Grime's usual striking palette of sonorities, while its closing bars set off a coruscating ripple that hangs in the air. The interweaving strands and often brittle sonorities of the second movement recreate the lattice forms of Bacon's work, while the downward trajectories of the third aptly reflect her willows."

Tim Ashley of The Guardian gave the piece a slightly more mixed review, however, elaborating:

Grime echoes Bacon's work by weaving sonic fragments and melodic shapes into tapestries of sound that coalesce, disperse and reform as the textures alternately thicken, lighten and glare through the score's three movements. The outer sections have a brittle quality that is in danger of turning insubstantial, though the central slow movement-cum-scherzo, with its slowly shifting string writing, carries deeper emotional resonance. With a Mahler-sized orchestra at her disposal, Grime's scoring is at times extravagant, and marked by a fondness for tintinnabulatory effects supplied by an array of tuned percussion. It arouses mixed feelings, but Rattle conducted it with considerable energy and drive, and the playing was dexterous, elegant and crystal clear.
