= Helen Grime =

Scottish composer

Helen Grime MBE (born 1981) is a Scottish composer of contemporary classical music. Her work, Virga, was selected as one of the best ten new classical works of the 2000s by the Royal Scottish National Orchestra. She is married to the composer and pianist Huw Watkins.

== Early life ==
Grime's grandparents were music teachers in Macduff, Aberdeenshire. Her mother also taught music, at St. Margaret's School, Edinburgh. Though she was born in York, England, Grime's parents returned to Scotland with her when she was a baby, and she spent her early years in Ellon, Aberdeenshire.

As a youth, Grime learned the oboe with John Anderson, whilst her sister Frances learned violin. Grime began music studies at age 9 at the City of Edinburgh Music School, and continued at age 17 at St Mary's Music School. She played the oboe in the National Youth Orchestra of Scotland. She started to compose from age 12, where her teachers included Hafliði Hallgrímsson.

Grime continued formal studies at the Royal College of Music (RCM), where she studied composition with Julian Anderson and Edwin Roxburgh and played oboe in the RCM Sinfonietta and RCM Baroque Orchestra. She earned first-class honours and a master's degree from the RCM in 2004. Her other composition teachers included Sally Beamish and Jennifer Martin. Grime was a Legal and General Junior Fellow at the Royal College of Music from 2007 to 2009 and a 2008 Leonard Bernstein Fellow at the Tanglewood Music Center (USA).

== Career ==
Grime became a lecturer in composition at the Department of Music at Royal Holloway, University of London, in January 2010.

Grime's compositions include an oboe concerto, for which she herself was the soloist in its world premiere, written on commission from the Meadows Chamber Orchestra (Edinburgh), and for which she won a "Making Music" prize in the British Composer Awards. Other works have included Virga (2007), commissioned by the London Symphony Orchestra and later performed at The Proms in August 2009. A Cold Spring (2009) was commissioned by Birmingham Contemporary Music Group and premiered 20 June at Aldeburgh Festival, conducted by Oliver Knussen. The BBC commissioned her work Everyone Sang for the 75th anniversary of the BBC Scottish Symphony Orchestra in 2010. In 2010, she was signed to Chester Music for publication of her music. In February 2011, she was named the next associate composer of The Hallé Orchestra, starting in autumn 2011, for a contracted period of three years.

In November 2025 Grimes won an Ivor Novello Award for her piece Folk for soprano and orchestra.

== Personal life ==
Grime is married to the composer and pianist Huw Watkins, who has performed her works in concert.

She was appointed Member of the Order of the British Empire (MBE) in the 2020 New Year Honours for services to music.

== Selected compositions ==
Stage

- Doorstepping Susanna, chamber opera for soprano, counter-tenor, bass, bass clarinet, double bass and percussion (2002)

Orchestral

- Virga (2007)
- Everyone Sang (2010)
- Night Songs (2012)
- Near Midnight (2012)
- Two Eardley Pictures (1. "Catterline in Winter," 2. "Snow") (2016)
- Woven Space (2017)
- Meditations on Joy (2019)

Concertante

- Oboe Concerto (2003)
- Clarinet Concerto (2009)
- Violin Concerto (2016)
- Piano Concerto (2017)
- Percussion Concerto (2019)
- Trumpet Concerto, night-sky-blue (2022)

Chamber and ensemble music

- 5 Miniatures (1996)
- Quintet for flute, clarinet, violin, cello and piano (2002)
- Romance for violin and piano (2003)
- Blurred Edges for flute (piccolo), clarinet (bass clarinet), violin, cello, harp and piano (2004)
- Chasing Butterflies for 100 violas (8-part ensemble) (2004)
- Song for Seven Instruments (2004)
- Quartet (2004)
- Elegiac Inflections for wind ensemble (2005)
- 5 Movements for cello and piano (2005)
- YKSITOISTA for chamber ensemble (2005)
- Into the Faded Air for 2 violin, 2 violas and 2 cellos (2007)
- The Brook Sings Loud for violin, cello and piano (2008)
- Piano Trio (2008)
- A Cold Spring for chamber ensemble (2009)
- To See the Summer Sky for violin and viola (2009)
- Fantasie, Danse, Cérémonie for flute and harp (2010)
- 7 Pierrot Miniatures for flute (piccolo), clarinet (bass clarinet), violin (viola), cello and piano (2010)
- Luna for flute, oboe, clarinet, horn, percussion and piano (2011)
- Oboe Quartet (2012)
- String Quartet No 1 (2014)
- String Quartet No 2 (2021)

Piano

- The Flash of Fireflies in Folds of Darkness (2004)
- Harp of the North (2004)
- Entwined Channels for 2 pianos (2006)
- 10 Miniatures (2009)

Vocal

- A Vision for soprano, clarinet, violin and cello (2000)
- A Last Look for soprano and piano (2002)
- In the Mist for tenor and piano (2008)
- Nobody Comes for voice and piano (2008)

Choral

- Lachrymae for chorus a cappella (2005)
- Missa Brevis for choir and organ (2023)
