= Huw Watkins =

British composer and pianist (born 1976)

- Born: 13 July 1976 (age 49); South Wales
- Education: Chetham's School of Music; King's College, Cambridge; Royal College of Music
- Occupations: Classical pianist; Composer; Academic teacher
- Organizations: Royal College of Music
- Watkins' voice recorded March 2015

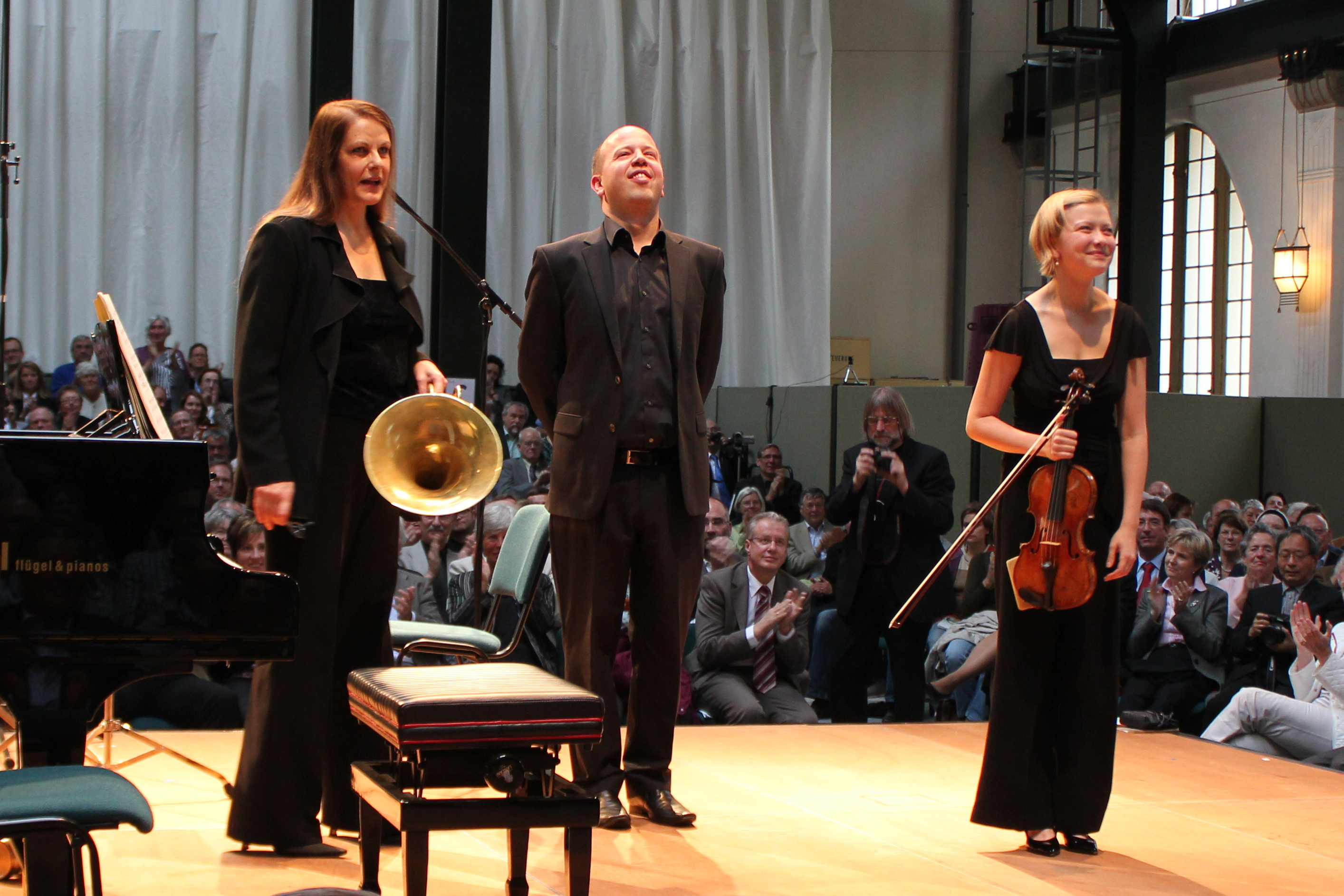
Marie-Luise Neunecker, Huw Watkins, Alina Ibragimova

Huw Thomas Watkins MBE (born 13 July 1976) is a British composer and pianist. Born in South Wales, he studied piano and composition at Chetham's School of Music in Manchester, where he received piano lessons from Peter Lawson. He then went on to read music at King's College, Cambridge, where he studied composition with Robin Holloway and Alexander Goehr, and completed an MMus in composition at the Royal College of Music, where he studied with Julian Anderson. Huw Watkins was awarded the Constant and Kit Lambert Junior Fellowship at the Royal College of Music, where he used to teach composition. He is Honorary Research Fellow at the Royal College of Music. He is married to fellow composer Helen Grime.

== Career ==
In 1999, the Nash Ensemble premiered Watkins' Sonata for Cello and Eight Instruments, which had been commissioned by Faber Music. The review in The Times declared that "at 22, Huw Watkins is already a composer to be reckoned with". The work has since been performed by the Birmingham Contemporary Music Group in London, Paris, Copenhagen and Aldeburgh under the direction of Sakari Oramo and Peter Rundel.

In 2000, the BBC National Orchestra of Wales gave the first performance of Watkins' Sinfonietta under Grant Llewellyn, and as a result of the collaboration, a piano concerto was commissioned for the same orchestra. This was given its premiere – with Watkins at the piano – in May 2002, under Martyn Brabbins.

His works include a Nocturne for solo horn and chamber orchestra – first performed and recorded in March 2002 by David Jolley and the Cincinnati Chamber Orchestra under Mischa Santora; a Cello Sonata, recorded with his brother Paul Watkins for Nimbus Records on a CD of 20th-Century British cello music; String Quartet No. 3, written for the Belcea Quartet and premiered at London's Wigmore Hall in 2004.

More recent works include a London Concerto, commissioned by the London Symphony Orchestra to mark their centenary in 2005; Rondo for Birmingham Contemporary Music Group; a Nash Ensemble commission celebrating their 40th Anniversary, and a Double Concerto for viola, cello and orchestra premiered at the 2005 BBC Proms. His composition Dream has been released on the Britten Sinfonia own label, on an album entitled Songs of the Sky. 2014 saw the premiere of "On The Other Hand – Concerto for Brass Band and 2 Jazz Trumpets", commissioned by Ty Cerdd for the National Youth Brass band of Wales.

Chamber music has always been central to Watkins' output: in 2001 his String Quartet No. 2 was premiered at the Cheltenham Festival by the Petersen Quartet, and the Brahms Ensemble Hamburg gave the first performance of his Variations on a Schubert Song at the Gstaad Festival. He recorded his Cello Sonata with Paul Watkins for Nimbus Records and premiered Fantasy for viola and piano with Lawrence Power in 2006. His String Quartet No. 3 was written for the Belcea Quartet, who gave its premiere at the Wigmore Hall in February 2004. Also at the same Hall, the Nash Ensemble premiered their commission Gig in 2005, and Alina Ibragimova gave the world premiere of Partita for solo violin. This was broadcast as part of BBC Radio 3's 2006 lunchtime concert series. He has performed and recorded at the Spannungen chamber music festival in Heimbach.

Song settings are another area of compositional interest. Watkins' setting for tenor and string quartet of Dylan Thomas' In My Craft or Sullen Art was premiered by Mark Padmore and the Petersen Quartet at the Wigmore Hall in May 2007. Watkins' Three Auden Songs (2009) were commissioned by Mark Padmore. The Five Larkin Songs (2010), which were premiered by Carolyn Sampson, won the Vocal category of the 2011 British Composer Awards.

As a pianist, Huw Watkins is regularly heard on BBC Radio three, both as a soloist and with artists such as Alina Ibragimova, Daniel Hope, Nicholas Daniel and Alexandra Wood. He has given premieres of works by Alexander Goehr, Peter Maxwell Davies and Mark-Anthony Turnage. He has performed concertos with the BBC Symphony Orchestra and Orchestra of the Swan as well as being the Britten Sinfonia's pianist. He has recorded Thomas Adès' song cycle The Lover in Winter with the countertenor Robin Blaze for EMI Classics, and his recording of contemporary British music for violin and piano with Alexandra Wood was released on Usk in 2005. His most recent recording was of the piano cycle Symmetry Disorders Reach by Alexander Goehr, for Wergo.

Watkins' Violin Concerto was premiered at The Proms on 17 August 2010, performed by Alina Ibragimova, for whom it was written.

Watkins was appointed Member of the Order of the British Empire (MBE) in the 2021 Birthday Honours for services to music.

== Personal life ==
Watkins is married to the composer Helen Grime, whose works he has performed in concert.

== Selected works ==
=== Orchestral and Large ensemble works ===
- Anthem for orchestra (2005)
- Broken Consort for ensemble (2008)
- Cello Concerto (2016)
- Crime Fiction a chamber opera in one act (2008)
- Double Concerto for viola, cello and orchestra (2005)
- Flute Concerto (2013)
- Horn Concerto (2024)
- London Concerto for violin, bassoon, harp and orchestra (2005)
- Nocturne for horn and chamber orchestra (2001)
- Piano Concerto (2002)
- Rondo for chamber ensemble (2005)
- Sinfonietta for orchestra (2000)
- Symphony No 1 (2016)
- Symphony No 2 (2020–21)
- Violin Concerto (2010)

=== Chamber, Small ensemble and solo works ===
- Coruscation and Reflection for violin and piano (1998)
- Dream for clarinet, violin and piano (2006)
- Fanfares for soprano saxophone and piano (2006)
- Fantasy for viola and piano (2006)
- Four Spencer Pieces for piano (2001)
- Gig for flute, clarinet, harp and string quartet (2005)
- In My Craft or Sullen Art for tenor and string quartet (2007)
- Miniatures for viola and piano (2009)
- Partita for solo violin (2006)
- Piano Trio (2009)
- Pièce d'orgue for solo organ (2005)
- Postlude for flute, clarinet, harp and string quartet (2007)
- Prelude for solo cello (2007)
- Romance for violin and piano (2003)
- Sad Steps for piano and string sextet (2008)
- Sonata for cello and piano (2000)
- Sonata for Cello and Eight Instruments (1999)
- Speak Seven Seas for clarinet, viola and piano (2011)
- String Quartet No. 2 (2001)
- String Quartet No. 3 (2004)
- String Quartet (2013)
- Suite for Harp (2006)
- Tarantella for violin and piano (2002)
- Three Welsh Songs for Strings (2008–2009)
- Three Auden Songs for tenor and piano (2009)
- Trio for horn, violin and piano (2008)
- Two Chorales for clarinet and piano (2000)
