= Tansy Davies =

English composer

- Born: 29 March 1973 (age 53); Bristol, UK
- Occupation: Composer
- Era: Contemporary
- Works: Compositions
- Website: Tansy Davies

Tansy Davies (born 29 May 1973) is an English composer of contemporary classical music. She won the BBC Young Composers' Competition in 1996 and has written works for ensembles such as the London Symphony Orchestra, the BBC Symphony Orchestra and the BBC Scottish Symphony Orchestra. In 2023 she was awarded the Ivor Novello Award for Outstanding Works Collections at The Ivors Classical Award in recognition of her outstanding achievements in composition. In 2019, she was listed as one of the UK's most influential people by the Evening Standard's Progress 1000, alongside Simon Rattle and Dave.

== Early life ==
Davies was born in Bristol and began singing and playing guitar in a rock band. She developed an interest in composition in her teens and studied composition and French horn at the Colchester Institute, followed by further study with Simon Bainbridge at the Guildhall School of Music and Drama and with Simon Holt. Davies has been Composer-in-Residence at Royal Holloway, University of London, where she gained a PhD, and currently teaches at the Royal Academy of Music in London. She also worked for three years as a freelance horn player and was a member of the Moon Velvet Collective.

== Commissions ==
Davies was a prizewinner in the 1996 BBC Young Composers' Competition. She has received a number of commissions from a number of organisations, for such works as the following:

- Iris (2004), commission from the Cheltenham Festival
- Residuum (2004), commission from the Orchestra of the Swan
- Tilting (2005), commission from the London Symphony Orchestra
- Spine (2005), commission from the Aldeburgh Festival
- As With Voices And With Tears (2010), commission for The Portsmouth Grammar School
- Christmas hath a darkness (2011), commission for A Festival of Nine Lessons and Carols, King's College Cambridge 2011.
- "Between Worlds" (2015), a commission from The Barbican Centre, for The English National Opera.

In February 2007, the Birmingham Contemporary Music Group and Thomas Adès gave the premiere of Falling Angel, a 20-minute commission for large ensemble in Birmingham, and at the Présences festival in Paris. Her first commission for The Proms, Wild Card for orchestra, received its world premiere in September 2010.

== Musical style ==
Davies' music is informed by the worlds of the classical avant-garde, funk, experimental rock, disco, bebop, alt-pop and modernism. Her scores contain unusual directions, such as 'urban, muscular', 'seedy, low slung', 'stealthy' and 'solid, grinding'. Other influences on her compositions have included the architecture of Zaha Hadid, in her trumpet concerto Spiral House. She has also collaborated with the video artist Zara Matthews. The Independent said of her:

Drawing on influences ranging from Luciano Berio to Miles Davis, and inspirations from architectural spaces to the tarot and the I Ching, she has created works such as Tilting (2005), Kingpin (2007) and Wild Card (2010), where compulsive rhythms, fragmented melody and outlandish counterpoint testify to her love of funk, contemporary jazz, the avant-garde, and a certain deep, unsettling sense of darkness.

Of her 2006 work Falling Angel, Davies said in the Daily Telegraph:

Like a lot of my music, it's built up layer by layer, a bit like funk. But, whereas funk is incredibly tight, I make something very baggy. I like to keep people guessing by suggesting a pulse, and then showing that actually the true pulse is somewhere else.

== Recordings ==
Davies has been the subject of three portrait CDs, Troubairitz (Nonclassical Recordings, 2011), Spine (NMC Recordings, 2012) and Nature (NMC, 2021). Other compositions appear in various anthologies, notably on the NMC label.

== Compositions ==
Davies' first opera, Between Worlds, is about the terror attacks in the USA in 2001. She commented in the Guardian:

I don't think it could have been done earlier. It just grew organically. We had another idea first. But gradually the librettist [poet] Nick Drake and the director Deborah Warner moved step by step towards it. The idea grew in all of us, and we knew we had to be brave and let ourselves be led by our highest instincts; to make something intensely human and to somehow transform or transcend the darkness into light. The story is told from many perspectives, from those trapped inside one of the Twin Towers, from there on the ground (people in NYC looking up), and from a far, cosmic place: an orchestral "fabric of the universe", with the figure of a shaman at its centre who relays messages across time and space... Music is a fantastic vehicle for expressing energy, emotion, feelings that go beyond language.

Her chamber opera of 2018, Cave, with Drake as librettist again, was staged in an abandoned industrial warehouse by The Royal Opera. It uses electronics as well as a small ensemble and "only two singers".

- The Void in This Colour (2001) – chamber ensemble of 13 players
- Inside Out ii (2003)
- Genome (2003)
- neon (2004) – chamber ensemble of 7 players
- Iris (2004) – soprano saxophone and chamber ensemble of 15 players
- grind show (electric) (2007) – chamber ensemble of 5 players with electronics
- Hinterland (2008) – chamber ensemble
- Leaf Springs (2008)
- grind show (unplugged) (2008)
- Destroying Beauty (2008) – voice and piano
- This Love (2009) – tenor and piano
- Static (2009) – tenor and piano
- Troubairitz (2010) – soprano and percussion
- Wild Card (2010) – orchestra
- Greenhouses (2011) – female voice, alto flute, percussion and double bass
- Christmas Eve (2011) – mixed voice
- Aquatic (2011) – duet for cor anglais and percussion
- Nature (2012) – concerto for piano and 10 players
- Delphic Bee (2012) – wind nonet
- Re-greening for large singing orchestra (2015)
