= Virga (composition) =

Short orchestral composition written in 2007 by the Scottish composer Helen Grime

Virga is a short orchestral composition written in 2007 by the Scottish composer Helen Grime. The work was commissioned by the London Symphony Orchestra in partnership with UBS, as part of the UBS Soundscapes: Pioneers series. The piece was given its world premiere by the London Symphony Orchestra conducted by Yan Pascal Tortelier at the Barbican Centre, London, on 1 July 2007. In 2010, Virga was selected by the Royal Scottish National Orchestra as one of the ten best new classical works of the 2000s.

== Composition ==
Virga is cast in a single movement and lasts about 6 minutes. Its title comes from the eponymous term for visible precipitation that evaporates before reaching the ground.

=== Instrumentation ===
The piece is written for a large orchestra comprising three flutes (2nd and 3rd doubling piccolo), two oboes, Cor anglais, three clarinets (3rd doubling bass clarinet), two bassoons, contrabassoon, four horns, three trumpets, trombone, bass trombone, tuba, timpani, two percussionists, harp, celesta, and strings.

== Reception ==
Virga has been generally praised by classical music critics. Andrew Clements of The Guardian called it "a taut little orchestral showpiece" that "stands up well to repeated hearing, packaged in glowing orchestral colours, and containing the right number of striking ideas."

== Recording ==
A recording of Virga performed by The Hallé conducted by Jamie Phillips was released through NMC Recordings, alongside other Grime orchestral and chamber music, on 22 September 2014.
