= Elbenita Kajtazi =

Kosovar operatic sopran (born 1991/1992)

- Born: c. 1991; Mitrovica
- Occupation: Opera singer
- Employer: Deutsche Oper Berlin
- Website: kajtazielbenita.com

Elbenita Kajtazi (born c. 1991–1992) is a Kosovar soprano opera singer.

Elbenita Kajtazi was born in Mitrovica, Kosovo, the eldest of seven children. In 1999, she and her family fled Mitrovica to Albania during the Kosovo War, leaving their home shortly before a Serbian tank drove through it. They and many other refugees were robbed by Serbian soldiers; Kajtazi recalls a soldier put a rifle to her head demanding money from her father. She began performing publicly in a refugee camp and took music lessons after her family returned to Mitrovica. She turned to opera after watching Maria Callas performances on YouTube.

Kajtazi attended the University of Prishtina, then became a soloist for the Kosovo Philharmonic. From 2014 to 2016, Kajtazi was a Young Artist Fellow at the Deutsche Oper Berlin. In March 2018, she competed in the inaugural Glyndebourne Opera Cup. It was her first visit to England since she had previously been unable to obtain a visa. She won third prize as well as the Audience Award, winning over many with her performance of Konstanze's aria from Mozart's Die Entführung aus dem Serail. She said "The aria is about sadness and I know what that is."

She joined the Hamburg State Opera in 2018. In the 2019-2020 season, she starred as Nannetta in Giuseppe Verdi's Falstaff, with her debut shown live on German television. The opera was directed by Calixto Bieito, known for his provocative stagings. In one scene, Kajtazi's Nannetta cups the testicles of Fenton. Kajtazi refused Bieito's request that she appear partially nude in one scene. She was to return to Glyndebourne to appear as Adina in Gaetano Donizetti's L'elisir d'amore in the summer of 2020, but this was one of many performances cancelled that year due to COVID-19.

In 2021, she was the first person to represent Kosovo at the BBC Cardiff Singer Of The World competition.

== Personal life ==
She is married to the Kosovar composer, Ardian Halimi.
