= David Sawer =

British composer

David Sawer (born 14 September 1961) is a British composer of opera and choral, orchestral and chamber music.

== Biography ==
Sawer was born in Stockport, England. After attending Ipswich School, he studied music at the University of York where he began composing contemporary music-theatre pieces. He directed the UK premiere of Mauricio Kagel's Kantrimiusik at the ICA, conducted the UK premieres of Mare Nostrum and Szenario, and appeared as solo performer in Phonophonie at the South Bank Centre, London, and a non-singing role in the world premiere of Harrison Birtwistle's Gawain at the Royal Opera House.

In 1984 he won a DAAD scholarship to study with Mauricio Kagel in Cologne. Even from this point his career, Sawer's music tends to define each piece within theatrical terms and his works often reference the visual arts, and in particular surrealist imagery. For example, his piano piece, The Melancholy of Departure was inspired by the shadowy and irrational perspectives of a De Chirico painting.

In 1992 Sawer was awarded the Fulbright-Chester-Schirmer-Scholarship; he won a Paul Hamlyn Foundation Award in 1993, an Arts Foundation Fellowship in 1995 and was composer in association with the Bournemouth Symphony Orchestra in 1996. In 2007 he featured in a composer portrait concert as part of the Philharmonia's 'Music of Today' series. He was awarded a Civitella Ranieri Foundation Fellowship in 2006 and a MacDowell Fellowship, taking residence in 2016. He teaches composition at the Royal Academy of Music, London.

Sawer has received numerous commissions that have resulted in impressive works for the concert hall, dance, film, theatre and radio. His 50-minute radio composition Swansong (1989), a collage of orchestral, choral and electronic sounds, inspired by the work of Hector Berlioz, won a Sony Radio Award and a Prix Italia Special Mention.

Sawer's work reflects a variety of influences, from Igor Stravinsky to György Ligeti and Luciano Berio. Certain characteristics remain from his early music: for instance the blurring of background and foreground in his first orchestral work, Trompe l'oeil (1982; since withdrawn).

Ensembles who have performed his work include Asko/Schoenberg Ensemble, Birmingham Contemporary Music Group, Continuum Ensemble, Holst Sinfonietta, Israel Contemporary Players, Juilliard Ensemble, Klangforum Wien, London Sinfonietta, Lontano, musikFabrik, Oberlin Sinfonietta, Remix Ensemble/Porto, Riot Ensemble and Tokyo Sinfonietta. Orchestras who have performed his work include Aarhus Symphony Orchestra, Basel Sinfonietta, Bournemouth Symphony Orchestra, BBC Symphony Orchestra, BBC National Orchestra of Wales, BBC Philharmonic, Britten Sinfonia, Hallé, Hessischer Rundfunk Frankfurt, Netherlands Radio Symphony, Norddeutscher Rundfunk Sinfonieorchester, Norrköping Symfoniorkester, ORF Symphonieorchester, Philharmonia Orchestra, West Australian Symphony Orchestra. Conductors of his work include George Benjamin, Martyn Brabbins, Andrew Davis, Paul Daniel, Sian Edwards, Mark Elder, Richard Farnes, Edward Gardner, Reinbert de Leeuw, Brad Lubman, Susanna Mälkki, Esa-Pekka Salonen, Leonard Slatkin, Jac van Steen, Ilan Volkov, Mark Wigglesworth.

In the theatre, he has worked with playwrights Howard Barker, Edward Bond, Nick Dear, Paul Godfrey and David Harrower. His score for Gogol's Government Inspector at the Young Vic theatre was described as "what may be the best soundtrack I've ever heard in the world of straight theatre" (The Arts Desk).

His music is published by Universal Edition and Edition Peters.

== Selected works ==
=== Stage works ===
- The Panic, a chamber opera, premiered in 1991.
- From Morning to Midnight, an opera in seven scenes, based on Georg Kaiser's play, premiered in 2001 by English National Opera, for which he a received Laurence Olivier Award Nomination for Outstanding Achievement in Opera and a Royal Philharmonic Society Award Nomination (Large-scale Composition).
- Skin Deep, an operetta on the theme of plastic surgery, to a libretto by Armando Iannucci, and co-commissioned by Opera North, Bregenz Festival, and Royal Danish Opera Copenhagen, premiered on 16 January 2009.
- Rumpelstiltskin, a ballet in eight scenes, for six dancers and thirteen players, commissioned by BCMG, premiered on 14 November 2009 at the CBSO Centre, Birmingham, and toured to Tramway, Glasgow the Huddersfield Contemporary Music Festival and the Spitalfields Music Festival.
- The Skating Rink, an opera in three acts based on Roberto Bolaño's The Skating Rink to a libretto by Rory Mullarkey. Premiered on 5 July 2018 at Garsington Opera who commissioned the work.

Recent works include Flesh and Blood, a dramatic scene for two voices and orchestra, premiered at the Barbican by the BBC Symphony Orchestra conducted by Ilan Volkov, with soloists Christine Rice and Marcus Farnsworth, Wonder, for SATB choir, included in the Choirbook for the Queen, a concert suite of Rumpelstiltskin , premiered by BCMG at the Wigmore Hall, conducted by George Benjamin, and The Lighthouse Keepers, a radio play based on a Grand Guignol play, adapted by David Harrower, for the 2013 Cheltenham Festival. Future commissions include works for Onyx Brass/2014 New Music Biennial, Aurora Orchestra/NMC Recordings/Science Museum, London Sinfonietta/Royal Ballet/RPS Drummond Fund, Birmingham Contemporary Music Group/Feeney Trust and the BBC Singers.

=== Orchestral works ===
- Byrnan Wood (1992)
- Trumpet Concerto (1994)
- Tiroirs, for chamber ensemble (1996)
- the greatest happiness principle (1997)
- Piano Concerto (2002) winner of British Academy British Composer Award in the orchestra category/Venice Biennale.
- Rebus, for chamber ensemble (2004)
- April \ March for large ensemble (2016) choreographed by Aletta Collins for Royal Ballet (Blue Moon)
- Sphinx (2024)

=== Choral works ===
- Songs of Love and War (1990)
- Sounds: Three Kandinsky Poems (1996–99)
- Stramm Gedichte (2002)
- How Among the Frozen Words (2019) Royal Philharmonic Society Award Nomination (Large-scale Composition)

=== Chamber works ===
- The force that through the green fuse for flute, clarinet, trumpet, trombone, piano, 2 violins, 2 violas, 2 cellos (1981) (withdrawn)
- Cat's-eye for 2 clarinets, trumpet, trombone, harp, piano, viola and violoncello (1986); choreographed by Richard Alston for Ballet Rambert; design by Paul Huxley
- Take Off for flute, 2 clarinets, piano, violin, viola and violoncello (1987) shortlisted for the 1989 Gaudeamus Award
- Between for harp; first performed by Osian Ellis in 1989
- Good Night for alto flute/piccolo, harp, violin, viola and violoncello (1989)
- Satz for violin, violoncello and piano (2007)
- Bronze and Iron for brass quintet (2013)
- Coachman Chronos for nine players (2014)
- Caravanserai for 14 players (2015) commissioned by The John Feeney Charitable Trust

=== Theatre ===
- Endgame (Old Vic); The Trial, Enemy of the People, The Government Inspector, The Good Soul of Szechuan (Young Vic); Hamlet (RSC); The Blue Ball (National Theatre); Food of Love (Almeida); Jackets (Bush)

=== Radio ===
- Swansong, The Long Time Ago Story (with Rose English/BBC Radio 3 Between the Ears)

=== Film ===
- Rumpelstilzchen (BalletBoyz/Curzon Cinemas/Sky Arts)

== Sources ==
- "Sawer, David in Oxford Music Online". www.oxfordmusiconline.com. (Requires login or UK library card)
