= Simon Bainbridge =

British composer (1952–2021)

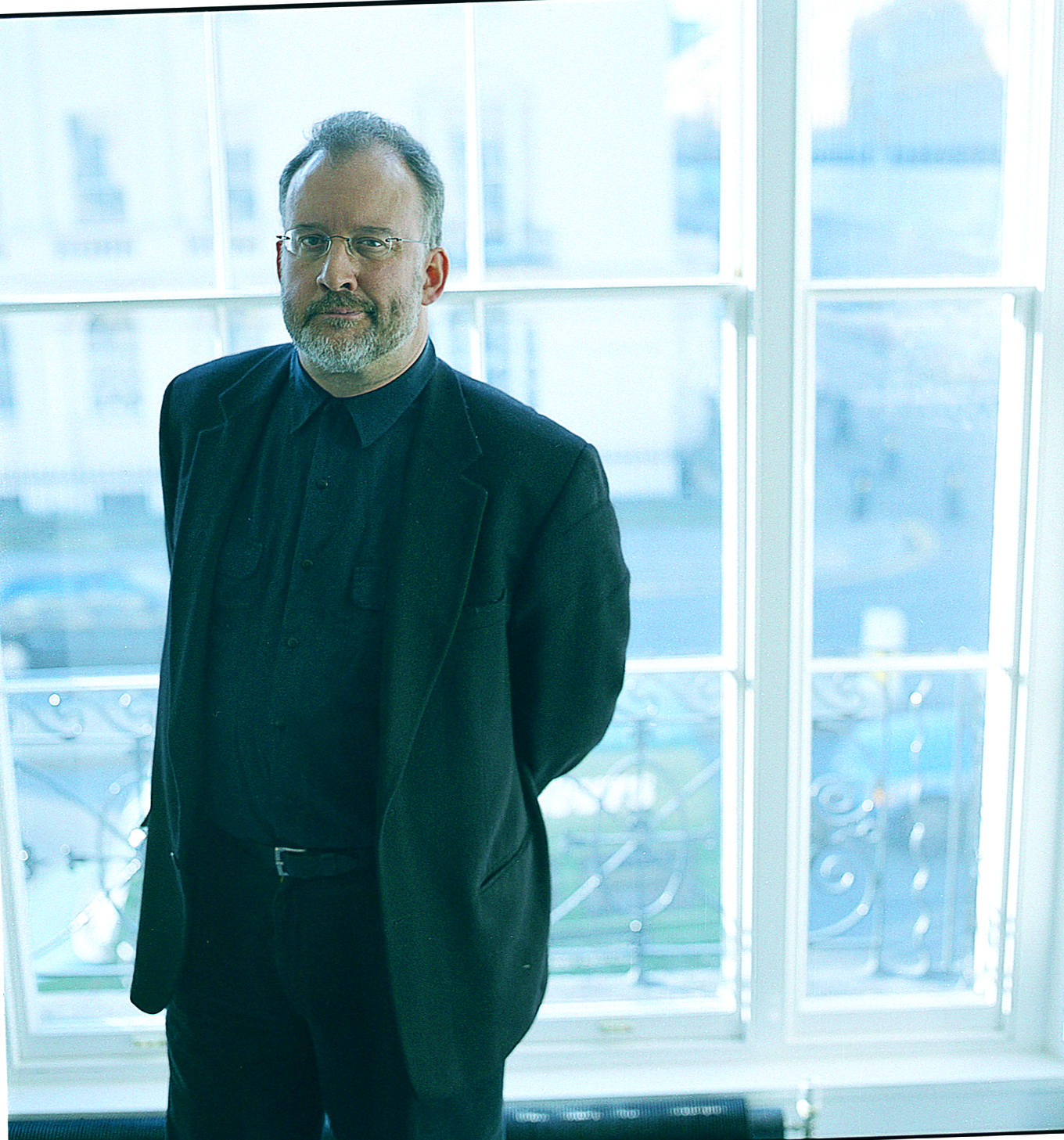
British composer Simon Bainbridge in 2007

Simon Bainbridge (30 August 1952 – 2 April 2021) was a British composer. He was also a professor and head of composition at the Royal Academy of Music, London, and visiting professor at the University of Louisville, Kentucky, in the United States.

== Biography ==
Bainbridge was born in London. He had his first major break with Spirogyra, written in 1970 while he was still a student. This work displays a passion for intricate and sensuous textures that remained the hallmark of Bainbridge's style. He was educated at Highgate School and the Royal College of Music. After graduating from the Royal College of Music, he studied with Gunther Schuller at Tanglewood; his fondness for American culture was occasionally portrayed in works such as Concerto in Moto Perpetuo (1983), which contains echoes of American minimalism, and the bebop-inspired For Miles (1994). In the 1990s, his work took on a new expressive dimension in works such as Ad Ora Incerta (1994), which earned him the Grawemeyer Award in 1997.

Bainbridge was head of composition at the Royal Academy of Music from 1999 to 2007, and was one of the first four professors to be appointed in 2000 with the Academy's status as a constituent college of the University of London.

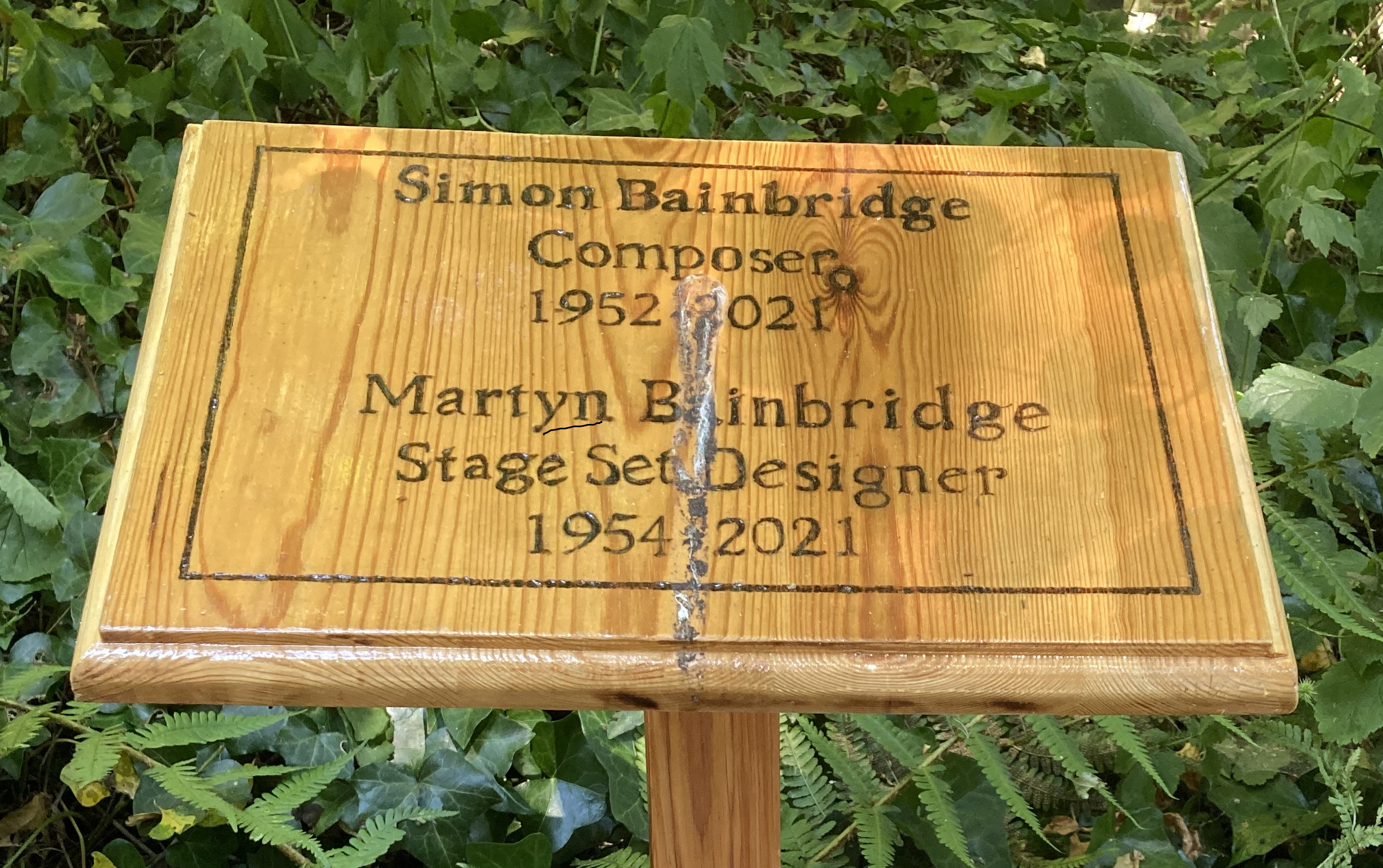
Plaque in Highgate Cemetery above the grave of Simon Bainbridge

Bainbridge died on 2 April 2021, aged 68, after four years of pain following unsuccessful back surgery. Bainbridge was married with one daughter. His ashes are interred on the western side of Highgate Cemetery with the ashes of his brother Martyn Bainbridge, a stage set designer.

== Career highlights ==
- 1969–1974 – Studied at Royal College of Music, London, then at Tanglewood with Gunther Schuller
- 1976–1978 – Forman Fellow in Composition at the University of Edinburgh
- 1983–1985 – Composer-in-residence at Southern Arts
- 1997 – University of Louisville Grawemeyer Award for Music Composition for Ad Ora Incerta
- 2001 – Appointed head of composition at the Royal Academy of Music
- 2002 – Fiftieth-birthday events in Cheltenham, Huddersfield and London

== Key works ==
- String Quartet No. 1 (1972)
- Viola Concerto (1976)
- Fantasia for Double Orchestra (1984)
- Clarinet Quintet (1993)
- For Miles for trumpet and chamber ensemble (1994)
- Ad Ora Incerta, Four Orchestral Songs from Primo Levi for mezzo-soprano, bassoon and orchestra (1994); poems by Primo Levi
- Four Primo Levi Settings for mezzo-soprano, clarinet, viola and piano (1996); poems by Primo Levi
- Guitar Concerto for guitar and chamber ensemble (1998)
- Chant for amplified chorus and large ensemble (1999)
- Voiles for bassoon and string ensemble (2001)

== Selected recordings ==
- Ad Ora Incerta; Four Primo Levi Settings – NMC D059
- Herbsttag – USK 1224CD
