= Julian Anderson =

British composer and teacher of composition

Julian Anderson CBE (born 6 April 1967) is a British composer and teacher of composition.

== Biography ==
Anderson was born in London. He studied at Westminster School, then with John Lambert at the Royal College of Music, with Alexander Goehr at Cambridge University, privately with Tristan Murail in Paris, and on courses given by Olivier Messiaen, Per Nørgård and György Ligeti.

From 2000 to 2004 he was Head of Composition at the Royal College of Music, and from 2004 to 2007, Fanny P. Mason Professor of Music at Harvard University. He is currently Professor of Composition and Composer in Residence at the Guildhall School of Music and Drama. He was Composer-in-Association with the City of Birmingham Symphony Orchestra from 2001 to 2005 and Daniel R. Lewis Fellowship Composer with the Cleveland Orchestra from 2005 to 2007. From 2002 to the end of the 2010–11 concert season, he was artistic director of the 'Music of Today' concert series run by the Philharmonia Orchestra in London. From 2013 to 2016 he was Composer in Residence with Wigmore Hall.

Anderson was appointed Commander of the Order of the British Empire (CBE) in the 2021 New Year Honours for services to music.

== Music ==
Anderson's former publisher, Faber Music, describes his music as:

... characterised by a fresh use of melody, vivid contrasts of texture and lively rhythmic impetus. He has a continuing interest in the music of traditional cultures from outside the Western concert tradition. He has a special love for the folk music of Eastern Europe–especially of the Lithuanian, Polish and Romanian traditions–and has also been much influenced by the modality of Indian ragas.

These influences combine with elements of modernism, spectral music and electronic music to make up what Gramophone has called "the composer's vivid, transfixing sound worlds".

Anderson's first orchestral piece, Diptych, was completed in 1990, and achieved great success, as did Khorovod (completed in 1994) and Alhambra Fantasy (2000), both composed for the London Sinfonietta. The latter work has been performed by the Ensemble InterContemporain, the Asko Ensemble and the Ensemble Modern, often under the direction of Oliver Knussen, who was, until his death in 2018, a regular collaborator and advocate for Anderson's music.

His first work written for the CBSO, Imagin'd Corners, premiered in 2002, was described by the Daily Telegraph as "seeth[ing] with variety of texture, dynamics and colour, from the atmospheric stillness of the opening to the high density and tumult as the piece reaches its final climax. This is a fine score, full of optimism and real creative drive." A year later, Symphony was composed for the CBSO and their chief conductor Sakari Oramo.

In the last decade, Anderson has written a large amount of unaccompanied choral music, including O Sing Unto the Lord for Westminster Cathedral, I Saw Eternity (2003, first performed by the London Philharmonic Choir) and the Four American Choruses (2001-4, for the City of Birmingham Symphony Chorus and their conductor Simon Halsey, who gave their first UK performance in 2005). While appearing simpler in style than his instrumental music, these pieces are often related to the larger works, both technically (for example 'At the Fountain', the last of the Four American Choruses, has the same melodic and harmonic basis as a passage from Alhambra Fantasy) and aesthetically (the American poet Emily Dickinson is a recurring presence, as are themes of non-denominational spirituality or a secularised Christianity).

Anderson has also used both live and pre-recorded electronics in his large-scale Book of Hours for 20 players and electronics, composed for the Birmingham Contemporary Music Group, who gave the first performance in February 2005 with Oliver Knussen. His third and final full orchestral work composed for Birmingham forces, Eden, was first heard at the 2005 Cheltenham International Music Festival, played by the CBSO under Martyn Brabbins, and is an exploration of the non-tempered tuning of the harmonic series. This preoccupation with fusing tempered modality and non-tempered resonance is continued in his largest work to date, Heaven is Shy of Earth, an oratorio for mezzo-soprano, chorus and orchestra lasting nearly 35 minutes, commissioned by the BBC for the 2006 Promenade Concerts, where it was premiered by singer Angelika Kirchschlager and the BBC Symphony Orchestra and Chorus conducted by Sir Andrew Davis. A new version of that work, expanded through the addition of a new (third) movement, 'Gloria (with Bird)', was premiered at the Barbican Centre on 26 November 2010 with Susan Bickley as the soloist.

Further choral-orchestral works came in the shape of Alleluia for chorus and orchestra, composed for the reopening of the Royal Festival Hall ("The London Philharmonic Choir, with nowhere to hide in such a revealing acoustic, maintained pitch admirably and delivered a virtuoso cadenza of animated susurration"), and the shorter Harmony, commissioned as the opening work for the 2013 season of the BBC Proms. In between these came Fantasias, a 25-minute orchestral work premiered by the Cleveland Orchestra in November 2009 displaying a new interest in multi-movement structures, and The Discovery of Heaven, commissioned and premiered as part of Anderson's composer residency with the London Philharmonic Orchestra; the latter two works feature on a recent portrait disc of the composer by the same orchestra.

An earlier portrait disc, Alhambra Fantasy, featuring five of Anderson's orchestral and ensemble pieces conducted by Oliver Knussen, won the 2007 Gramophone Best of Category (Contemporary) Award, from a shortlist which also included the NMC disc Book of Hours. (Both CDs were released in 2006, and were the first two commercially available discs entirely devoted to Anderson's work.)

In May 2014 Anderson's first opera, Thebans, received its world premiere at English National Opera, conducted by Edward Gardner. Playwright Frank McGuinness wrote the three-act libretto based on Sophocles' three Theban plays: Oedipus the King, Oedipus at Colonus and Antigone. Pierre Audi, Artistic Director of the De Nederlandse Opera, directed the co-production between English National Opera and Theater Bonn.

Anderson received two Ivor Novello Award nominations at The Ivors Classical Awards 2024. Mitternachtslied, for soprano and ensemble, received a nomination for Best Chamber Ensemble Composition and ECHOES, for solo baritone, chorus and orchestra, received a nomination for Best Orchestral Composition in association with Dorico.

In October 2025 he received an Ivor Novello Award nomination for Best Choral Composition for his piece Nothing At All.

== Works ==
Dramatic

- Towards Poetry, ballet (1999; extended version for dance of Poetry Nearing Silence (1997))
- The Comedy of Change, ballet, chamber ensemble (2009), commissioned by Ballet Rambert
- Thebans (2010–14), for English National Opera

Orchestral

- Diptych (1988–90)
- Tye's Cry, string orchestra (1995)
- Past Hymns, string orchestra (1996)
- The Crazed Moon (1996–97)
- The Stations of the Sun (1997–98)
- Alhambra Fantasy, chamber orchestra (1998–2000)
- The Bird Sings with its Fingers, four choreographic sketches for chamber orchestra (2000)
- Imagin'd Corners, five horns and orchestra (2001–02)
- Symphony No. 1 (2002–03)
- Eden (2004–05)
- Fantasias (2007–09)
- The Discovery of Heaven (2011)
- In lieblicher Bläue, solo violin and orchestra (2014–15)
- Incantesimi (2015–16)
- The Imaginary Museum, concerto for piano and orchestra (2016–17)
- Litanies, solo cello and orchestra (2018–19)
- Symphony No. 2 Prague Panoramas (2019–21)

Chamber Music

- String Quartet No. 1 Light Music (1984–85)
- Ring Dance, two violins/cellos (1987)
- Scherzo (with Trains), four clarinets (1993)
- Khorovod, chamber ensemble (1988–94, rev. 1995)
- Tiramisù, chamber ensemble (1993–94, rev. 1995)
- The Bearded Lady, oboe/clarinet and piano (1994)
- The Colour of Pomegranates, alto flute and piano (1994)
- Bach Machine, chamber ensemble (1997)
- Poetry Nearing Silence, chamber ensemble (1996–97) (also as ballet Towards Poetry)
- Book of Hours, ensemble and electronics (2002–04)
- Transferable Resistance, brass ensemble (2010)
- String Quartet No. 2 300 Weihnachtslieder (2014)
- Van Gogh Blue, chamber ensemble (2015)
- String Quartet No. 3 Hana no hanataba (2017–18)
- Fanfare SC-GH, two trumpets (2018)
- String Quartet No. 4 (2023-24)
- Ice Quartet, (String Quartet No.5) (2023-24)

Instrumental

Piano:

- Piano Études Nos. 1–4 (1995–99)
- Somewhere near Cluj, solo piano (1998)
- Quasi una passacaglia, solo piano (2002)
- Steps, solo piano (2003)
- Old Bells, solo piano (2004)
- Sensation, solo piano (2015–16)
- Capriccio, solo piano (2017)

Other:

- Prayer, solo viola (2009)
- Another Prayer, solo violin (2012)
- Catalan Peasant with Guitar, solo guitar (2015)
- Landscapes, solo cello (2018-19)
- Mime, solo clarinet (2020)

Vocal

- Seadrift, soprano and chamber ensemble (1988–93)
- I'm nobody, who are you?, tenor, violin and piano (1995)
- Shir Hashirim, soprano and orchestra (2001)
- Lucretius, soprano and percussion (2008)
- Tombeau, soprano and piano trio (2017)

Choral

- SING, unaccompanied chorus (1981–82, rev. 2019)
- O Sing Unto the Lord, SATB chorus (1999)
- Four American Choruses, mixed voices (2002–2003)
- I Saw Eternity, unaccompanied chorus (2003)
- My Beloved Spake, SATB chorus and organ (2006)
- Heaven is Shy of Earth, mezzo-soprano, chorus and orchestra (2005–06, rev. 2009–10)
- Alleluia, choir and orchestra (2007)
- Bell Mass, choir and organ (2010)
- Harmony, choir and orchestra (2013)
- Magnificat, unaccompanied chorus (2016)
- Nunc dimittis, unaccompanied chorus (2016–17)
- Evening canticles, choir and organ (2018)
- Exiles, soprano, choir and orchestra (2021)

Anderson's music is published by Schott Music. Works written before 2014 are published by Faber Music.

== Awards ==
- 1993 Royal Philharmonic Society's Young Composer Prize
- 2001 South Bank Show Award for the Best New Dance Work for The Bird Sings with its Fingers
- 2004 British Composer Award for Symphony
- 2006 Royal Philharmonic Society Music Award for Large-Scale Composition for Book of Hours
- 2007 Best of Category (Contemporary) Gramophone Award Winner for the recording Alhambra Fantasy (BBC Sinfonietta / Oliver Knussen)
- 2011 British Composer Awards for Fantasias and Bell Mass
- 2013 South Bank Show Award for The Discovery of Heaven and for education work with the London Philharmonic Orchestra
- 2015 British Composer Awards for Thebans and String Quartet No. 2
- 2016 Royal Philharmonic Society Music Award for Chamber-Scale Composition for Van Gogh Blue
- 2017 BBC Music Magazine Premiere Award for In lieblicher Bläue and Alleluia (LPO Label)
- 2023 Grawemeyer Award for Music Composition for Litanies
