= Vic Hoyland =

British composer

Vic Hoyland (born 11 December 1945) is a British composer. He was born in Wombwell, Yorkshire, England.

Educated at Hull and York universities (where he completed his PhD), Hoyland was Haywood Fellow at the University of Birmingham where he became Professor in Composition until his retirement in 2011. He now lives in the North Yorkshire moors.

Influenced by Luciano Berio and Franco Donatoni, Hoyland has composed pieces for the BBC Symphony Orchestra, the Arditti Quartet and the Lindsay String Quartet. A CD of two orchestral works, Vixen and In Transit, featuring the BBC Symphony Orchestra under Martyn Brabbins was released by NMC in 2002.
