= 2021 in classical music =

This article is for major events and other topics related to classical music in 2021.

== Events ==
- 1 January
  - The Vienna Philharmonic performs its annual Neujahrskonzert, conducted by Riccardo Muti, without a live audience for the first time in the history of the concert, in the wake of the COVID-19 pandemic.
  - Clemens Schuch becomes managing director of Bärenreiter-Verlag.
- 4 January – Dutch National Opera and Ballet announces the appointment of Stijn Schoonderwoerd as its new general director (algemeen directeur), effective 1 February 2021.
- 7 January – The Montreal Symphony Orchestra announces the appointment of Rafael Payare as its next music director, effective with the 2022–2023 season, with an initial contract of 5 years.
- 11 January
  - The Bavarian Radio Symphony Orchestra announces the appointment of Sir Simon Rattle as its next chief conductor, effective with the 2023–2024 season, with an initial contract of 5 years.
  - The London Symphony Orchestra announces that Sir Simon Rattle is to stand down as music director of the orchestra in 2023, and subsequently to take the title of conductor emeritus for life.
  - The Opéra national de Bordeaux announces that Marc Minkowski is to stand down as artistic director of the company in 2022.
  - The city of Leipzig announces Hans-Joachim Schulze and Christoph Wolff as the joint recipients of the Bach-Medaille 2021 der Stadt Leipzig, the first time that the Leipzig Bach Medal has been awarded to two recipients.
- 12 January – The National Repertory Orchestra announces the appointment of Michael Stern as its new music director.
- 13 January
  - Klaus Lederer, Berlin Senator for Culture, announces the closure of theatres and opera houses in Berlin through Easter 2021, in the wake of the COVID-19 pandemic.
  - Midori is announced as one of the recipients of the 2020 Kennedy Center Honors.
- 14 January – The State Academic Symphony Orchestra of the Russian Federation announces the appointment of Vasily Petrenko as its next principal conductor, effective 1 September 2021.
- 19 January – The New Century Chamber Orchestra announces the appointment of Richard Lonsdorf as its new executive director, with immediate effect.
- 22 January – The City of Birmingham Symphony Orchestra announces that Mirga Gražinytė-Tyla is to conclude her tenure as its music director after the 2021–2022 season, and subsequently to take on the post of principal guest conductor.
- 25 January
  - The Gesellschaft für Musikgeschichte Baden-Württemberg announces the appointment of Frieder Bernius as its new president.
  - The Metropolitan Opera announces the appointment of Marcia Sells as its new chief diversity officer, the first such appointment in the history of the company.
  - Opera Columbus announces the appointment of Julia Noulin-Mérat as its next general director and chief executive officer, with immediate effect.
- 26 January – The Rochester Philharmonic Orchestra announces the appointment of Andreas Delfs as its next music director.
- 27 January
  - The Opéra national de Lorraine announces the appointment of Marta Gardolińska as its next music director, the first female conductor ever named to the post, effective with the 2021–2022 season, with an initial contract of three seasons.
  - Dallas Opera announces the cancellation of its scheduled spring 2021 subscription season, in the wake of the COVID-19 pandemic.
  - Seong-Jin Cho gives the first performance of a recently re-discovered piano piece by Wolfgang Amadeus Mozart, the Allegro in D, K. 626b/16, at the Great Hall of the Salzburg Mozarteum Foundation.
- 28 January – The Bayreuth Festival announces the appointment of Ulrich Jagels as its new managing director.
- 29 January
  - The American Composers Orchestra announces that George Manahan is to conclude his music directorship of the ACO on 1 July 2021, and subsequently to take the title of music director emeritus.
  - The Metropolitan Opera announces Erin Morley, Brenda Rae, Anthony Roth Costanzo, Ben Bliss, and Ryan Speedo Green as the joint recipients of the 2021 Beverly Sills Award, the first time that this award has been divided among multiple singers.
- 3 February – The Orchestre Lamoureux announces the appointment of Adrien Perruchon as its next music director, effective autumn 2021, with an initial contract of 3 seasons.
- 4 February
  - The Opéra national de Paris announces the appointment of Ching-Lien Wu as its new Cheffe des Chœurs (director of choruses), the first female conductor named to the post, effective 26 April 2021.
  - Dutch National Opera announces the departure of Ching-Lien Wu as its chorus director, effective April 2021.
- 5 February – The Schleswig-Holstein Musik Festival announces Isata Kanneh-Mason as the recipient of its Leonard Bernstein Award for 2021.
- 8 February – The American Composers Orchestra announces the appointment of Melissa Ngan as its next president and chief executive officer, the first woman ever named to the posts, effective February 16, 2021.
- 9 February
  - The Fort Worth Symphony Orchestra announces the appointment of Robert Spano as its next music director, effective with the 2022–2023 season, with an initial contract of three years.
  - The Oregon Symphony announces the appointment of David Danzmayr as its next music director, effective with the 2021–2022 season.
- 12 February – The Santa Fe Opera announces the appointment of David Lomelí to its newly created post of chief artistic officer, effective 1 May 2021.
- 16 February – Rory Jeffes announces his intention to stand down as chief executive officer of Opera Australia.
- 18 February
  - The City of London Corporation announces the cancellation of plans for the intended Centre for Music, with scheduled renovations of the Barbican Centre to occur instead.
  - The Boston Symphony Orchestra announces the appointment of Gail Samuel as its next president and chief executive officer, the first woman named to the posts, effective 21 June 2021.
- 19 February
  - The Queensland Symphony Orchestra announces the re-appointment of Johannes Fritzsch to the orchestra as its new principal conductor and artistic adviser, with a contract until 2023.
  - The Mikhailovsky Theatre announces the appointment of Alevtina Ioffe as its new musical director, the first female conductor ever named to the post, with immediate effect.
- 22 February – Long Beach Opera announces the appointment of James Darrah as its new artistic director and chief creative officer, with immediate effect, with an initial contract through 2024.
- 1 March – The Caramoor Center for Music and the Arts announces the appointment of Edward J. Lewis III as its next president and chief executive officer, effective 1 May 2021.
- 9 March – The Charleston Symphony Orchestra announces a structural reorganisation that includes elimination of the position of music director, with Ken Lam scheduled to conclude his tenure in the post at the close of the 2021–2022 season.
- 10 March – Boston Lyric Opera announces that Esther Nelson is to stand down as its general director and artistic director at the close of the 2020–2021 season.
- 11 March – The Real Orquesta Sinfónica de Sevilla announces the appointment of Marc Soustrot as its next principal conductor and artistic director, with an initial contract of 3 years.
- 12 March – The Association of British Orchestras announces its 2021 ABO Awards at its 2021 conference:
  - ABO Award: The Musicians
  - Classical Music Artist Manager of the Year: Moema Parrott
  - Classical Music Concert Hall Manager of the Year: John Gilhooly
  - Orchestra Manager of the Year: Crispin Woodhead
  - Commendation: Greg Felton
  - ABO Special Award: John Summers and Timothy Walker
- 16 March – Royal Northern Sinfonia announces the appointment of Dinis Sousa as its next principal conductor, effective September 2021.
- 17 March
  - The Borletti-Buitoni Trust announces Silvia Colasanti as the recipient of the Franco Buitoni Award 2021.
  - Mills College announces that it is to transition away from its status as a degree-granting college institution.
- 18 March – The BBC announces that the leadership team of BBC Radio 3 is to relocate to Salford.
- 23 March
  - Michigan Opera Theatre announces the appointment of Christine Goerke as its new associate artistic director, with a contract of 3 years.
  - The New England Conservatory of Music announces the appointment of Benjamin Sosland as its new provost and dean, effective 5 July 2021.
- 30 March
  - The London Symphony Orchestra announces the appointment of Sir Antonio Pappano as its next chief conductor, effective in September 2024.
  - The Royal Opera announces that Sir Antonio Pappano is to conclude his tenure as ROH music director at the close of the 2023–2024 season.
- 31 March – The Orchestre national d'Auvergne announces the appointment of Thomas Zehetmair as its next principal conductor, effective with the 2021–2022 season.
- 7 April – Southbank Sinfonia and St John's Smith Square mutually announce their merger into a single charity and organisation, Southbank Sinfonia at St John's Smith Square.
- 8 April – The London Philharmonic Orchestra announces the appointment of Elena Dubinets as its next artistic director, effective September 2021, following the departure of Cristina Rocca from the post.
- 9 April – The NHK Symphony Orchestra announces the appointment of Fabio Luisi as its next chief conductor, effective September 2022, with an initial contract of 3 years
- 10 April
  - National Opera gives its premiere company performance, of Mozart's La Clemenza di Tito, at Llewellyn Hall of Australian National University in Canberra.
  - Australian Vocal Ensemble (AVÉ) performs its debut concert at the queensland Conservatorium Theatre.
- 12 April – Cologne Opera announces the appointment of Hein Mulders as its new artistic director (Intendant), effective with the 2022–2023 season.
- 13 April – English Touring Opera announces the appointment of Gerry Cornelius as its next music director, with immediate effect.
- 15 April – The SWR announces the appointment of Lydia Rilling as the next artistic director of the Donaueschinger Musiktage, the first woman ever named to the post, effective 1 March 2022.
- 16 April – The Paris Opera announces the appointment of Gustavo Dudamel as its next music director, effective 1 August 2021, with an initial contract of 6 seasons.
- 21 April – The Detroit Symphony Orchestra announces that Anne Parsons is to retire as its president and chief executive officer in the autumn of 2022.
- 22 April – The Berliner Symphoniker announces the appointment of Hansjörg Schellenberger as its next chief conductor.
- 26 April – The Baltimore Symphony Orchestra announces that Peter Kjome is to stand down as its president and chief executive officer after the close of his contract in January 2022.
- 28 April – The Cité de la Musique – Philharmonie de Paris announces the appointment of Olivier Mantel as its next artistic director, effective 1 November 2021, with an initial contract of 5 years.
- 2 May – The BBC announces percussionist Fang Zhang as the BBC Young Musician 2020.
- 10 May – The Cleveland Institute of Music announces the appointment of Carlos Kalmar as its next director of orchestral studies, effective 1 July 2021.
- 11 May – Barbara Klepsch, the Culture Minister of Saxony, announces simultaneously that at the close of the 2023–2024 season, Peter Theiler is to stand down as Intendant of the Semperoper and that Christian Thielemann is to conclude his chief conductorship of the Staatskapelle Dresden.
- 18 May – The recreation – Grosses Orchester Graz announces the appointment of Mei-Ann Chen as its next principal conductor, the first female conductor and the first Asian conductor to be named to this post, effective with the 2021–2022 season.
- 20 May – The Chicago Symphony Orchestra announces that Duain Wolfe is to retire as director of the Chicago Symphony Chorus at the close of the 2021–2022 season.
- 24 May
  - The Artemis Quartet announces that it is suspending its activities for an indefinite period.
  - The Donatella Flick LSO Conducting Competition 2021 announces Julio García Vico as its winner, with Chloe Rooke as the winner of the Audience Prize.
- 26 May – The Prague Radio Symphony Orchestra announces the appointment of Petr Popelka as its next chief conductor, effective with the 2022–2023 season.
- 27 May – An overnight fire at the Bussy-Saint-Georges Conservatory destroys part of the building, including a room stored with musical instruments.
- 31 May – The Toronto Mendelssohn Choir announces the appointment of Jean-Sébastien Vallé as its next artistic director.
- 1 June – Ottawa Chamberfest announces the appointment of Mhiran Faraday as its next executive director, effective 14 June 2021.
- 2 June – The Virginia Symphony Orchestra announces the appointment of Eric Jacobsen as its next music director, effective with the 2021–2022 season.
- 7 June – New York City Opera announces the appointment of Constantine Orbelian as its new music director and principal conductor.
- 8 June
  - The Semperoper announces the appointment of Nora Schmid as its incoming Intendantin, the second woman to hold the post, effective with the 2024–2025 season.
  - Graz Opera announces that Nora Schmid is to stand down as its Intendantin at the close of the 2022–2023 season.
  - The Opéra de Toulon announces the appointments of Marzena Diakun and Valerio Galli as joint principal conductors of the company, effective 1 September 2021.
- 12 June
  - The Melbourne Symphony Orchestra announces the appointment of Jaime Martin as its next chief conductor, effective in 2022.
  - Queen's Birthday Honours List 2021:
    - Imogen Cooper is made a Dame Commander of the British Empire.
    - Eleanor Alberga, Julian Lloyd Webber, John Summers, and Michael Volpe are each made an Officer of the Order of the British Empire.
    - Jess Gillam, Huw Watkins, and Sarah Willis are each made a Member of the Order of the British Empire.
  - The 2021 Malko Competition announces its prize winners:
    - 1st prize: Dmitry Matvienko
    - 2nd prize: Linhan Cui
    - 3rd prize: Chloé Dufresne
- 15 June
  - The Ernst von Siemens Foundation announces Georges Aperghis as the recipient of the Ernst von Siemens Prize 2021 for music.
  - A fire destroys the Dobson Pipe Organ Builders facility in Lake City, Iowa, USA.
- 16 June
  - The Berliner Festspiele announces that Thomas Oberender is to stand down as Intendant of the festival at the end of 2021.
  - The Západočeského Symfonického Orchestru v Mariánských Lázních (West Bohemian Symphony Orchestra) announces the appointment of Radek Baborák as its new chief conductor, effective with the 2021–2022 season.
  - The Cincinnati Symphony Orchestra announces that Louis Langrée is to conclude his tenure as its music director at the close of the 2023–2024 season.
- 17 June – The Kimmel Center for the Performing Arts and The Philadelphia Orchestra announce plans to unite the two organisations into a single entity, to be called The Philadelphia Orchestra and Kimmel Center, Inc.
- 19 June – BBC Cardiff Singer of the World 2021 competition results:
  - Main Prize – Gihoon Kim
  - Song Prize – Masabane Cecilia Rangwanasha
  - Audience Prize – Claire Barnett-Jones
- 23 June – The Barbican Centre announces that Sir Nicholas Kenyon is to stand down as its managing director in September 2021.
- 24 June – BBC Radio 3 announces its newest roster of New Generation Artists, effective September 2021, for the period from September 2021 to December 2023:
  - Tom Borrow, piano
  - Helen Charlston, mezzo-soprano
  - María Dueñas, violin
  - Konstantin Krimmel, baritone
  - Kunal Lahiry, piano
  - Mithras Trio
  - Quatuor Mona
  - William Thomas, bass
- 29 June
  - The Palau de les Arts Reina Sofía announces the appointment of James Gaffigan as its next music director, effective 1 September 2021, with an initial contract of 4 years.
  - Houston Grand Opera announces the appointment of Khori Dastoor as its next general director and CEO, the first woman ever named to the posts, effective January 2022.
- 2 July – The Poznań Philharmonic announces the appointment of Łukasz Borowicz as its new music director and chief conductor, with immediate effect.
- 7 July
  - The 2021 Scottish Awards for New Music are announced:
    - Award for Large Scale New Work (11+ performers): Aileen Sweeney – Above the Stars
    - Good Spirits Co-Award for Innovation in New Traditional Music: GRIT Orchestra – The Declaration
    - Mark McKergow Award for Innovation in Jazz: Liam Shortall – Corto Alto
    - The Musicians' Union Award for Installation/Sound Art/Electroacoustic New Work: Martin Suckling with Joan Clevillé and Genevieve Reeves – these bones, this flesh, this skin
    - The ISM Award for New Music in Covid Times: Nevis Ensemble – Lochan Sketches
    - The Locavore Award for Environmental Sustainability: Scottish Classical Sustainability Group – Nevis Ensemble, Scottish Ensemble, et al.
    - Award for the Recording of New Music: David Fennessy – The Night With... Live Vol. One & Letters:
    - The Dorico Award for Small/Medium Scale Work: Edwin Hillier – Plastica
    - The Dorico Award for Solo Work: Ailie Robertson – Skydance
    - The RCS Award for Education/Community Project: StAMP – University of St Andrews in partnership with The Wallace Collection
    - The EVM Award for New Music in Media: Luci Holland – Sayo
    - The RCS Award for Making It Happen: Aileen Sweeney and Ben Eames – Ear to the Ground
    - The SMIA Award for Creative Programming: Scottish Ensemble – 2020 programme
  - The Toronto Symphony Orchestra announces that Matthew Loden is to stand down as its chief executive officer, effective 22 September 2021.
- 8 July – The Maggio Musicale Fiorentino announces the appointment of Daniele Gatti as its next principal conductor, effective March 2022, with an initial contract of 3 years.
- 12 July – The government of Greece announces the dissolution of the orchestra Armonia Atenea, in the wake of unpaid debts.
- 13 July – The Spoleto Festival USA announces the appointment of Mena Mark Hanna as its next general director, effective October 2021.
- 14 July – The Houston Symphony announces the appointment of Juraj Valčuha as its next music director, effective with the 2022–2023 season.
- 15 July
  - The San Francisco Symphony announces the resignation of Mark Hanson as its chief executive officer, effective 31 August 2021.
  - Flooding of the Wupper tributary of the Rhine River leads to extensive property damage at Wuppertal Opera.
- 19 July – The Belgian National Orchestra announces the appointment of Antony Hermus as its next chief conductor, effective with the 2022–2023 season, with an initial contract of four seasons.
- 21 July
  - Justino Díaz is announced as one of the recipients of the 2021 Kennedy Center Honors.
  - San Francisco Opera announces that Ian Robertson is to retire as its chorus director at the end of 2021.
  - Portland Opera announces the appointment of Priti Gandhi as its next artistic director.
- 22 July – The French Ministry of Culture announces the appointment of Emmanuel Hondré as the next director of the Opéra National de Bordeaux, effective August 2022.
- 25 July – Oksana Lyniv conducts the first night of the new Bayreuth Festival production of Der fliegende Holländer, the first female conductor ever to conduct at the Bayreuth Festival.
- 27 July – The Staatstheater Nürnberg announces that Joana Mallwitz is to conclude her tenure as its Generalmusikdirektorin at the close of the 2022–2023 season.
- 28 July – Queensland Conservatorium Griffith University announces the appointment of Bernard Lanskey as its new director.
- 30 July – The Theater Erfurt announces the appointment of Alexander Prior as its next Generalmusikdirektor, effective with the 2022–2023 season.
- 4 August – The BBC announces the appointment of Bill Chandler as the new director of the BBC Concert Orchestra, effective 4 September 2021.
- 6 August – The Rady Shell at Jacobs Park, in San Diego, California, features its inaugural concert, with the San Diego Symphony.
- 10 August – The BBC announces the appointment of Suzy Klein as its new head of arts and classical music TV, effective 4 October 2021.
- 11 August
  - Opera Australia announces the appointment of Fiona Allan as its new chief executive officer, the first woman ever named to the post.
  - Chamber Music America announces the appointment of Kevin Kwan Loucks as its new chief executive officer, effective 1 September 2021.
- 12 August
  - The Southbank Centre announces the appointment of Mark Ball as its next artistic director, effective January 2022.
  - The Royal Philharmonic Society awards Vladimir Jurowski the Royal Philharmonic Society Gold Medal for 2021, at the Royal Albert Hall during The Proms, on the occasion of his final concert as principal conductor of the London Philharmonic Orchestra.
- 20 August – The San Francisco Symphony announces the departure of Ragnar Bohlin as its chorus director at the close of August 2021.
- 24 August – The Metropolitan Opera announces the ratification by Local 802 of the American Federation of Musicians of a new labour agreement.
- 25 August – The Sarasota Orchestra announces the appointment of Bramwell Tovey as its next music director, effective with the 2022–2023 season, with an initial tenure of four years.
- 26 August – The Emerson String Quartet announces its intention to disband at the close of the 2022–2023 season.
- 27 August – The Curtis Institute of Music announces the departures of Gary Graffman and of Jennifer Higdon from its faculty.
- 30 August – Apple Inc. announces its acquisition of Primephonic, with discontinuation of the Primephonic platform scheduled to begin on 7 September 2021.
- 31 August
  - The Konzerthausorchester Berlin announces the appointment of Joana Mallwitz as its next chief conductor and artistic director, the first female conductor ever named to the posts, effective with the 2023–2024 season, with an initial contract of five seasons.
  - Portland Opera announces the conclusion of George Manahan's tenure as its music director.
- 2 September – The Theater und Philharmonie Essen announces the appointment of Merle Fahrholz as the new Intendantin of the Essen Aalto-Musiktheater, the Philharmonie Essen, and of the Essen Philharmonic, effective with the 2022–2023 season.
- 11 September – The Metropolitan Opera Chorus and Orchestra give the first live performance at the Metropolitan Opera, a performance of the Requiem of Giuseppe Verdi, since the advent of the COVID-19 pandemic and the subsequent cancellation of performances through the remainder of the 2019–2020 season and the whole of the 2020–2021 season.
- 14 September
  - Yo-Yo Ma is announced as the Music Laureate of the 32nd Praemium Imperiale.
  - The City of Birmingham Symphony Orchestra announces the appointment of Kazuki Yamada as its next chief conductor and artistic advisor, effective 1 April 2023, with an initial contract of 4.5 years.
  - José Carreras gives his final live concert performance, a charity benefit recital at the Vienna State Opera.
- 15 September
  - In an article from The New York Times, Jaap van Zweden announces his intention to stand down as music director of the New York Philharmonic at the close of the 2023–2024 season.
  - The Marin Symphony announces that Alasdair Neale is to stand down as its music director at the close of the 2022–2023 season.
- 18 September – The 2021 Leeds International Piano Competition announces its prize winners:
  - First prize: Alim Beisembayev
  - Second prize: Kaito Kabayashi
  - Third prize: Ariel Lanyi
  - Fourth prize: Dmytro Choni
  - Fifth prize: Thomas Kelly
- 20 September – The Metropolitan Opera announces Debra Lew Harder as the new host of the Metropolitan Opera radio broadcasts.
- 21 September – The Residentie Orchestra gives its first concert in the new Amare performing arts centre in The Hague, conducted by Anja Bihlmaier.
- 23 September
  - The Berliner Festspiele announces the appointment of Matthias Pees as its new Intendant, effective 1 September 2022.
  - The Chicago Symphony Orchestra announces a revision to the scheduled conclusion of the music directorship of Riccardo Muti, with an extension of the scheduled closing date of his tenure to the end of the 2022–2023 season.
- 27 September
  - The Orchestre national des Pays de la Loire announces the appointment of Sascha Goetzel as its next music director, effective 1 September 2022, with an initial contract of 4 years.
  - The Metropolitan Opera presents the first night of its new production of the opera Fire Shut Up in My Bones, with music by Terence Blanchard and libretto by Kasi Lemmons, the first opera with music and libretto by African-American artists ever to be staged by the company, and the first opera staged by the company ever to feature an African-American director, production co-director Camille A. Brown.
- 28 September – Calgary Opera announces the appointment of Jonathan Brandani as its new artistic director.
- 29 September – The Brussels Philharmonic announces the appointment of Kazushi Ōno as its next music director, effective with the 2022–2023 season.
- 8 October – The Nuremberg Symphony Orchestra announces that Kahchun Wong is to stand down as its chief conductor in August 2022.
- 9 October – At the Bolshoi Theatre, Yevgeny Kulesh, a dancer and stage extra, dies during a performance of Sadko, after being struck by a piece of backdrop scenery during a scene change.
- 11 October – The Teatro Comunale di Bologna announces the appointment of Oksana Lyniv as its new music director, effective January 2022, with an initial contract of 3 years. Lyniv is the first female conductor to be named music director of the company, and the first female conductor ever to be named music director of an Italian opera company.
- 13 October – The Atlanta Symphony Orchestra announces the appointment of Nathalie Stutzmann as its next music director, the first female conductor to be named to the post, effective with the 2022–2023 season, with an initial contract of four years.
- 14 October - John Williams makes his debut at the helm of the Berliner Philharmoniker in a concert of his own works.
- 15 October
  - The Choir of St John's College, Cambridge announces its intention to admit female singers to the choir for the first time in its history, effective in 2022.
  - The Glimmerglass Festival announces that Francesca Zambello is to stand down as its artistic director and general director at the close of its 2022 season.
- 17 October – The London Handel Festival announces the appointment of Gregory Batsleer as its next festival director, with immediate effect.
- 21 October
  - The French Ministry of Culture announces the appointment of Louis Langrée as the next music director of the Théâtre national de l'Opéra-Comique, with an initial contract of 5 years.
  - The XVIII International Chopin Piano Competition announces its prize winners:
    - 1st prize – Bruce (Xiaoyu) Liu (Canada)
    - 2nd prize ex aequo – Alexander Gadjiev (Italy/Slovenia)
    - 2nd Prize ex aequo – Kyohei Sorita (Japan)
    - 3rd Prize – Martin Garcia Garcia (Spain)
    - 4th Prize ex aequo – Aimi Kobayashi (Japan)
    - 4th Prize ex aequo – Jakub Kuszlik (Poland)
    - 5th Prize – Leonora Armellini (Italy)
    - 6th Prize – JJ Jun Li Bui (Canada)
- 25 October
  - The Adelaide Chamber Singers announce simultaneously the scheduled departure of Carl Crossin as artistic director and conductor at the end of 2021, and the appointment of Christie Anderson as the ensemble's new artistic director and conductor at the beginning of 2022.
  - The London Mozart Players announce the appointment of Flynn LeBrocq as its new chief executive, effective January 2022.
- 26 October – Oper Frankfurt announces the appointment of Thomas Guggeis as its next Generalmusikdirektor, effective with the 2023–2024 season, with an initial contract of 5 years.
- 29 October
  - The Noord Nederlands Orkest announces the appointment of Eivind Gullberg Jensen as its next chief conductor, effective with the 2022–2023 season.
  - Early Music America announces the appointment of David McCormick as its new executive director, effective 15 November 2021.
- 1 November – The Royal Philharmonic Society announces the recipients of the 2021 Royal Philharmonic Society Awards:
  - Chamber-Scale Composition: Laura Bowler – Wicked Problems
  - Conductor: Ryan Bancroft
  - Ensemble: Dunedin Consort
  - Gamechanger: Bold Tendencies
  - Impact: ENO Breathe
  - Inspiration: Hilary Campbell and Bristol Choral Society
  - Instrumentalist: Nicola Benedetti
  - Large-Scale Composition: Dani Howard – Trombone Concerto
  - Opera & Music Theatre: L'enfant et les sortilèges – Vopera
  - Series & Events: 'The World How Wide' – Chorus of Royal Northern Sinfonia
  - Singer: Jennifer Johnston
  - Storytelling: Kadiatu Kanneh-Mason – House of Music
  - Young Artist: The Hermes Experiment
- 2 November – The Korean Symphony Orchestra announces the appointment of David Reiland as its next artistic director, effective January 2022, with an initial contract of three years.
- 10 November – The Barcelona Symphony Orchestra and National Orchestra of Catalonia announces the appointment of Ludovic Morlot as its next principal conductor, effective with the 2022–2023 season, with an initial contract of four seasons.
- 12 November – The Spektral Quartet announces their intention to disband at the close of the 2021–2022 season.
- 18 November – Sir Roger Norrington conducts his self-proclaimed final concert, with the Royal Northern Sinfonia at The Sage, Gateshead.
- 20 November – At a concert by the Warsaw National Philharmonic Orchestra, a new composition by Paweł Szymański, it's fine, isn't it?, was removed from the originally scheduled programme after external protests regarding inclusion of sampled speech by Jarosław Kaczyński.
- 23 November – L'Ensemble contemporain de Montréal announces that it is to cease operations in 2022.
- 24 November – The Salzburg Festival announces the appointment of Kristina Hammer as its next president, effective 1 January 2022, with an initial contract through 31 December 2026.
- 30 November – The Rossini Opera Festival announces the appointment of Juan Diego Flórez as its next artistic director, effective 1 January 2022.
- 3 December – The Ensemble intercontemporain announces the appointment of Pierre Bleuse as its next music director, effective with the 2023–2024 season, with an initial contract of 4 years.
- 4 December – The Schleswig-Holstein Musik Festival announces Hannah Kendall as the recipient of its Hindemith Prize 2022.
- 5 December – The 44th Kennedy Center Honors takes place with US president Joe Biden and First Lady Jill Biden in attendance, the first appearance by the US president at the Kennedy Center Honors since 2016, and US vice president Kamala Harris and Second Gentleman Doug Emhoff also in attendance.
- 6 December
  - Oper Zürich announces the appointment of Matthias Schulz as its next Intendant, effective 1 August 2025.
  - The Royal Stockholm Philharmonic Orchestra announces the appointment of Ryan Bancroft as its next principal conductor, effective with the 2023–2024 season.
  - The University of Louisville announces Olga Neuwirth as the winner of the 2022 Grawemeyer Award, for her opera Orlando.
- 7 December
  - Opera San José announces the appointment of Shawna Lucey as its next general director and chief executive officer, effective January 2022.
  - San Francisco Opera announces the appointment of John Keene as its next chorus director, effective January 2022.
- 9 December
  - The Basel Sinfonietta announces the appointment of Titus Engel as its next principal conductor, effective with the 2023–2024 season.
  - The Detroit Symphony Orchestra announces the appointment of Erik Rӧnmark as its next president and chief executive officer, effective March 2022.
- 10 December
  - Emma Dunch resigns as chief executive officer of the Sydney Symphony Orchestra, with immediate effect.
  - The Helsinki Philharmonic Orchestra announces that Susanna Mälkki is to stand down as its chief conductor at the end of the 2022–2023 season, and subsequently to take the title of chief conductor emeritus with the orchestra.
- 14 December – The Sydney Symphony Orchestra announces the appointment of Craig Whitehead as its interim chief executive officer, with immediate effect.
- 15 December – The Metropolitan Opera announces a requirement for all audience members and company employees to have received COVID-19 vaccine boosters as a condition of entry, effective 17 January 2022.
- 16 December
  - Radio France announces the appointment of Lionel Sow as the next music director of the Chœur de Radio France, effective 1 September 2022, with an initial contract of 3 years.
  - The National Youth Orchestra of Canada announces the appointment of Sascha Goetzel as its next music director, for 2022 and 2023.
- 20 December – The Detroit Symphony Orchestra announces the transition of its president, Anne Parsons, to the post of its president emeritus, and the elevation of Erik Rӧnmark as its next president and chief executive officer, an acceleration of the latter appointment from its originally scheduled time of March 2022, both with immediate effect.
- 22 December – The Staatsorchester Rheinische Philharmonie announces the appointment of Benjamin Shwartz as its next chief conductor, effective with the 2022–2023 season.
- 29 December – Liona Boyd and John Estacio are each appointed to the Order of Canada.
- 31 December – 2022 New Year Honours:
  - John Gilhooly is made a Commander of the Order of the British Empire.
  - Alpesh Chauhan, Steven Osborne, and Mark Pemberton are each made an Officer of the Order of the British Empire.
  - Peter Broadbent and Andrew Carwood are each made a Member of the Order of the British Empire.

== New works ==
The following composers' works were composed, premiered, or published this year, as noted in the citation.

=== A ===
- Michael Abels – Emerge
- Rodolfo Acosta – las flores subterráneas
- Ondřej Adámek – Where Are You?
- Thomas Adès
  - Shanty – Over the Sea
  - Alchymia (clarinet quintet)
- Leila Adu-Gilmore – Colouring-In Book
- Kati Agócs – Voices of the Immaculate
- Kashimana Ahua and Khary Jackson – Don't Tread on Me: A Century of Racism
- Juan Arroyo – WAYRA
- Kinan Azmeh – Vol de nuit

=== B ===
- Guy Barash (music) and Nick Flynn (text) – 'Life Is Sweet'
- William Barton – Apii Thatini Mu Murtu
- Mason Bates – Soundcheck in C Major
- Sally Beamish – Distans (Double Concerto for Violin, Clarinet and Orchestra)
- Huw Belling (music) and Pierce Wilcox (text) – Fumeblind Oracle
- Sir George Benjamin – Concerto for Orchestra
- Alex Berko – Exodus
- Ragnhild Berstad – trãnseõ
- Jonathan Bingham - Tautology
- Annesley Black – abgefackelte wackelkontakte
- Charlotte Bray – When Icebergs Dance Away
- Courtney Bryan
  - Blessed
  - Requiem
- Eivind Buene – Personal Best
- Kenji Bunch – Time In
- Britta Byström – Parallel Universes

=== C ===
- Jay Capperauld – Nutshell Studies of Unexplained Death
- Ana Leira Carnero: Carnavalito XXI for Two Violins
- Christopher Cerrone - Concerto for Trumpet, Tuba and Orchestra
- Ann Cleare – anfa
- Didem Coskunseven – Ext.The Woods.Night
- Tom Coult – Pleasure Garden
- Kim Cunio – CO_{2} and the Ice Core
- Viet Cuong (music) and David Ferry (text) – Still So Much to Say
- Chaya Czernowin – Unhistoric Acts
- Edith Canat de Chizy – Rising Stars (text of Walt Whitman)

=== D ===
- Brett Dean
  - Imaginary Ballet
  - Notturno inquieto (Rivisitato; revised version)
- Elisabet Dijkstra – here, now
- Milica Djordjević – Čvor
- Jonathan Dove – In Exile
- Onur Dülger – Baiterek-Kut

=== E ===
- Thierry Escaich – Araising Dances

=== F ===
- Karmit Fadael – Parting
- Samantha Fernand – Everything Passes, Everything is Connected
- Francesco Filidei (music) and Hannah Dübgen (text) – The Red Death
- Stefan Freund – Voyageur Fantasy
- Beat Furrer – Tableaux I-III – Drei Skizzen für Orchester

=== G ===
- Álvaro Gallegos – Marte desde mi Ventana
- Ritika Ganguly and Roshan Ganu – Xylem
- Brenda Gifford – Minga Bagan
- Erik Griswold – How Strange the Change

=== H ===
- Lars Petter Hagen – Gestern
- Adolphus Hailstork (music) and Herbert Woodward Martin (text) – TULSA 1921
- Bryn Harrison – A Coiled Form
- David Philip Hefti –- Gallicinium: Musik zur vierten römischen Nachtwache für Bläserquintett
- Jake Heggie (music) and Margaret Atwood (texts) – Songs for Murdered Sisters
- Moya Henderson – Ruth Bader Ginsburg
- Jennifer Higdon – Wise Moon
- Anders Hillborg – Viola Concerto
- Simon Holt – Cloud Shadow
- Toshio Hosokawa – Violin Concerto (Genesis)
- Jack Hughes – Jubilate PM (for string quartet)
- Hasan Hujairi – Retreat Strategies

=== I ===
- Lisa Illean – Tiding II (silentium)
- Marton Illés – Forajzok

=== K ===
- Robert Keane – Suite for Two Pianos
- Hannah Kendall
  - "Where Is the Chariot of Fire?"
  - Rosalind (Sabrina Mahfouz, text)
- Gordon Kerry – Sinfonia concertante
- Andile Khumalo – The Broken Mirrors of Time
- Daniel Kidane – Revel
- Yair Klartag – Akward Dances and Passacaglia für Ensemble
- Natalie Klouda – Nightscapes 2020
- Martyna Kosecka – Concerto for Clarinet, Multipercussion and String Orchestra

=== L ===
- Larissa Lakner – Three-Minute Cello Concerto
- Vanessa Lann – Shining Still (text after Matthew Arnold)
- Mikołaj Laskowski – Transnatural#2
- Septina Rosalina Layan – The Planet: A Lament
- Mary Jane Leach – Alone Together
- James Lee III – Amer'ican
- George E. Lewis – Minds in Flux
- Liza Lim – World as Lover, World as Self
- Magnus Lindberg – Serenades
- Piyawat Louilarpprasert – Ohm-Na-Mo (โอม นะโม)

=== M ===
- Christian Mason – Somewhere in the distance (lost in the horizon
- Grace-Evangeline Mason – The Imagined Forest
- Wynton Marsalis – Concerto for Tuba and Orchestra
- Colin Matthews – Seascapes (texts by Sidney Keyes)
- Peri Mauer – Woman on a Journey (Kin Janabarhi Vra)
- Charlie McCarron and Oanh Vu – Chim Lạc (Lost Bird)
- Johannes MacDonald – 'The Sun is Coming (a warning from Ra)'
- Cecilia McDowall – There is no rose
- Sir James MacMillan
  - Christmas Oratorio
  - When Soft Voices Die
- Misato Mochizuki – Intrusions

=== N ===
- Angélica Negrón – The Island We Made
- Rebecca Nichloson and Asako Hirabayashi – Dear America, Beat Your Heart Defiantly, Naked and Open With Love
- Natalie Nicolas – Secrets
- Carolina Noguera Palau – Ferocious: Contorting femininities
- Shara Nova
  - tone-policing
  - Urgency
  - Resolve

=== O ===
- Elizabeth Ogonek – Cloudline
- Gabriela Ortiz – D'Colonial Californiano (Flute Concerto)

=== P ===
- Canela Palacios – los otros
- Ileana Perez Velazquez – Vitrales
- Joseph C. Phillips Jr. – The Undisappeared
- Lara Poe – Dialethia (for string quartet)
- Enno Poppe – Hirn
- Stefan Prins – under_current

=== Q ===
- Qin Yi – Silk

=== R ===
- Maja S.K. Ratkje – Considering Icarus
- Gity Razaz – Mother
- Kate Reid – Solander
- Matana Roberts – Auricular Hearsay
- Erin Rogers – Constancy
- Nima A. Rowshan – Propinquity

=== S ===
- Steven Christoper Sacco – Quartet for Bass Trombone, Vibraphone, Marimba, and Harp
- Rebecca Saunders (music) and Ed Atkins (text) – Us Dead Talk Love
- Coen Schenk – Sonata for piano
- Kurt Schwertsik – 'Haydn lived in Eisenstadt'
- Hannes Seidl (music) and Anselm Neft (text) – Die Flexibilität der Fische – Teil 1
- Michael Seltenreich – Sextet for Piano and Winds
- Caroline Shaw – 'We Need to Talk' (text by Anne Carson)
- Jack Sheen – Hollow propranolol séance
- Nina Shekhar – y-mas
- Sean Shepherd – Old Instruments
- Mark Simpson – Violin Concerto
- Chloe Sinclair – Rainfall of Diamonds
- Tyshawn Sorey
  - Save the Boys (text by Frances Ellen Watkins Harper)
  - Requiem for a plague
- Lewis Spratlan – FANTASY DANCES
- Paul Stanhope – A New Requiem
- Roger Stubblefield – Christmas Sweets

=== T ===
- Sir John Tavener – La Noche Oscura (completed in 2012, premiered 25 June 2021)
- Augusta Read Thomas
  - Filigree of the Sun (for string quartet)
  - Dance Figures
- Klas Torstensson – City Imprints
- Anna S. Þorvaldsdóttir – Catamorphosis
- Øyvind Torvund – Plans
- Joan Tower – 1920/2019
- Calliope Tsoupaki – Memento Nostri
- Mark-Anthony Turnage
  - Owl Songs
  - Up for Grabs
- Joe Twist – An Australian Song Cycle

=== V ===
- Thomas Van Dun – Unrestrictions
- Rick van Veldhuizen - mais le corps taché d'ombres
- Octavio Vasquez – Piano Quintet

=== W ===
- Errollyn Wallen – Sojourner Truth
- Rolf Wallin – Das war schön! (new double concerto version of the work); Concerto for percussion, cello and orchestra
- Wang Lu
  - Constellations Apart
  - Aftertouch
- José Sosaya Wekselmann – Tejidos andinos
- LJ White (music) and Alex Dimitrov (text) – a carol called love
- Kate Whitley (music) and Laura Attridge (text) – Our Future in Your Hands
- John Williams – Violin Concerto No. 2
- Randall Woolf – Leadville Pantoum

=== Z ===
- Pamela Z – Times3

== New operas ==
- Matthew Aucoin and Sarah Ruhl – Eurydice
- Anthony Bolton and Kit Hesketh-Harvey – The Life and Death of Alexander Litvinenko
- Deborah Cheetham – Parrwang Lifts the Sky
- John Corigliano and Mark Adamo – The Lord of Cries
- Peter Eötvös and Mari Mezei – Sleepless
- Samantha Ferrando and Melanie Wilson – Current, Rising
- Ben Frost and Daniela Danz – The Murder of Halit Yozgat
- Gordon Getty – Goodbye, Mr. Chips
- Pierre Jodlowski and Frank Witzel – Alan T.
- Laura Karpman and Taura Stinson – On the Edge
- Steven Mackey and Rinde Eckert – Moon Tea
- Damien Sneed and Karen Chilton – The Tongue & the Lash
- Kaija Saariaho and Sofi Oksanen (multilingual libretto translations by Aleksi Barrière) – Innocence
- Joel Thompson and Andrea Davis Pinkney – The Snowy Day
- Alexander Voltz – Edward and Richard: The True Story of the Princes in the Tower

== Albums ==
- Stéphan Elmas – Piano Concertos Nos. 1 and 2 ('The Romantic Piano Concerto', Volume 82; first recordings, Hyperion)
- Plaisirs Illuminés (works by Sándor Veress, Francisco Coll, Alberto Ginastera)
- Beschenkt (works by Sir George Benjamin, Peter Eötvös, Michael Gordon, HK Gruber, Chikage Imai, Cathy Milliken, Brigitta Muntendorf, Olga Neuwirth, Johannes Schöllhorn et al.; first recordings, Ensemble Modern Medien)
- Claire Cowan – Hansel and Gretel (first recording)
- Antonio Salieri and Marco Coltellini – Armida (first recording)
- John Eccles – Semele (second commercial and first professional recording)
- Imani Winds – BRUITS: Vijay Iyer – Bruits; Reena Esmail – The Light is the Same; Frederic Rzewski – Sometimes (premiere recordings)
- Chaya Czernowin – Heart Chamber
- Isidora Žebeljan – Zujte strune
- Mozart/Jones: Violin Sonatas Fragment Completions (fragments of violin/fortepiano sonatas by Wolfgang Amadeus Mozart, realised by Timothy Jones; first recordings)
- Australian Premières, Volume 2 (works of David Morgan, Andrew Ford, Robert Constable, and Eric Bryce; first recordings, recorded with a virtual orchestra)
- Hans Gál – Hidden Treasure: Hans Gál's unpublished Lieder (first recordings)
- Tansy Davies – Nature
- Martin Suckling – This Departing Landscape
- Alex Paxton – Music for Bosch People
- Christopher Cerrone – The Arching Path
- Francisco Coll – Aqua Cinerea / Hidd'n Blue / Four Iberian Miniatures / Violin Concerto / Mural
- Liza Lim – Liza Lim: Singing in Tongues
- Aldo Clementi – Canoni Circolari
- Charles Uzor – Mothertongue
- Havergal Brian – Faust (first recording)
- César Franck – Hulda (first recording)
- Walter Piston – Concerto for Orchestra, Variations on a Theme by Edward Burlingame Hill (first recordings), Divertimento for Nine Instruments, Clarinet Concerto

== Deaths ==
- 2 January – Paul Ganson, American orchestral bassoonist, 79
- 3 January – Tasso Adamopoulos, Greek-French violist and pedagogue, 76 (from COVID-19)
- 5 January – John Georgiadis, British orchestral violinist and leader, and conductor, 81
- 6 January
  - Reinhold Johannes Buhl, German cellist, 87
  - Osian Ellis, British harpist, 92
- 7 January – Biserka Cvejić, Serbian mezzo-soprano/contralto and pedagogue, 97
- 13 January – Henri Goraieb, Lebanon-born pianist resident in France, 85
- 14 January – Elijah Moshinsky, Australian opera director resident in the UK, 75 (from COVID-19)
- 22 January – Louis Dandrel, French music journalist, composer, administrator, and sound designer, 82
- 26 January – Eva Coutaz, Germany-born French recording executive (harmonia mundi), 76
- 30 January – Michel Trempont, Belgian baritone, 92
- 1 February
  - Cynthia Turner, Maltese pianist, 88 (from COVID-19)
  - Kevin McCutcheon, American conductor, 66 (from COVID-19)
  - John Weaver, American organist, 83
- 2 February – Libuše Domanínská, Czech soprano, 96
- 6 February – Jan Willem Loot, Dutch orchestra administrator, 77
- 7 February – Stefano Mazzonis di Pralafera, Italian opera director, 72
- 8 February – Roger Englander, American classical music television programme producer, 94
- 12 February
  - Jean-Marie Gamard, French cellist and pedagogue, 78
  - Paolo Isotta, Italian musicologist and writer, 70
- 13 February – Peter G. Davis, American opera and classical music critic, 84
- 15 February
  - Andréa Guiot, French soprano, 93
  - Steuart Bedford, British conductor, 81
- 24 February – Wolfgang Boettcher, German orchestral cellist, 86
- 26 February – Peggy Wiltrout, American oboist, 74 (from COVID-19)
- 1 March – Paul Laubin, American oboe maker, 88
- 2 March – Anna Shuttleworth, British cellist and pedagogue, 93
- 3 March – Medea Abrahamyan, Armenian cellist and pedagogue, 88
- 4 March – Helmut Winschermann, German oboist, conductor and pedagogue (body found on this date)
- 6 March
  - Renée Doria, French soprano, 100
  - Lou Ottens, Dutch engineer and inventor of the compact cassette tape, 94
- 7 March – Dmitri Bashkirov, Russian pianist, 89
- 8 March – Éva Tordai, Hungarian soprano, 83
- 9 March
  - Maarja Haamer, Estonian soprano, 82
  - James Levine, American conductor and pianist, 77
- 10 March – Stephen Scott, American composer, 76
- 13 March
  - Mark Lubotsky, Russian violinist, 89
  - Kenneth Cooper, American harpsichordist, pianist and musicologist, 79
- 14 March – Bliss Michelson, American radio announcer and double bassist, 74 (from COVID-19)
- 16 March – Emilia Fadini, Spain-born Italian harpsichordist, musicologist and pedagogue, 90
- 17 March – François Grenier, French harpsichordist, 39
- 20 March
  - Taryn Fiebig, Australian soprano, 49
  - Robert Gard, UK-born Australian tenor, 90
  - Yevgeny Nesterenko, Russian bass, 83 (from COVID-19)
- 21 March – Trisutji Djuliati Kamal, Indonesian composer, 84
- 23 March – Corinne Chapelle, USA-born French violinist, 44
- 24 March – Richard Stoker, British composer and actor, 82
- 25 March – Jaroslav Šaroun, Czech pianist, composer and pedagogue, 77
- 26 March – Coosje Wijzenbeek, Dutch violinist and pedagogue 72
- 29 March
  - Keiko Toyama, Japanese pianist, 87
  - Ottomar Borwitzky, German orchestral cellist, 90
  - Elaine Hugh-Jones, British composer, 93
  - Theodore Lambrinos, American baritone, 85 (from COVID-19)
- 31 March
  - Jane Manning, British soprano, 82
  - Valerie, Lady Solti, British music philanthropist, former arts journalist, and widow of Sir Georg Solti, 83
  - Jadwiga Wysoczanská-Štrosová, Czech soprano, 93
- 1 April – Susan Clickner, American mezzo-soprano and academic vocal teacher, 86
- 2 April – Simon Bainbridge, British composer, 68
- 7 April – Wayne Peterson, American composer, 93
- 10 April – Ilona Bartalus, Hungarian pedagogue and conductor, 80
- 11 April – Lou Magor, American choral conductor, pedagogue and pianist, 75
- 13 April – Rocco Filippini, Swiss cellist, 77 (from COVID-19)
- 14 April – Gerard Kantarjian, Egypt-born Canadian orchestral violinist and pedagogue, 89
- 15 April – Christopher Parker, British recording engineer, 95
- 24 April
  - Christa Ludwig, German mezzo-soprano, 93
  - József Soproni, Hungarian composer and pedagogue, 90
- 28 April – Paul Kellogg, American arts administrator, 84
- 29 April – Martin Bookspan, American radio and TV presenter, 94
- 30 April – Anthony Payne, British composer, 84
- 2 May – Joel Chadabe, American electronic and experimental composer, 82
- 4 May – Laurent Verney, French orchestral violist, 61
- 8 May – Ghenady Meirson, Ukraine-born pianist, pedagogue, and vocal repertoire coach, 63
- 10 May – Pauline Tinsley, British soprano, 93
- 14 May
  - Ester Mägi, Estonian composer, 99
  - Sándor Balassa, Hungarian composer and pedagogue, 86
- 15 May – Mildred Allen, American soprano, 91
- 19 May – Martin Turnovský, Czech conductor, 92
- 23 May – Cristóbal Halffter, Spanish composer and conductor, 91
- 1 June – Alexander Maykapar, Russian harpsichordist, organist, pianist, writer, broadcaster, music historian and pedagogue, 74
- 2 June – Fritz Noack, Germany-born organ builder resident in the US, 85
- 20 June
  - Gianna Rolandi, Lady Davis, American soprano and opera pedagogue, 68
  - Jeanne Lamon, American-Canadian violinist and conductor, 71
- 21 June – Mimi Stern-Wolfe, American pianist, composer, and concert impresario, 84
- 24 June – Richard Hoffmann, American composer and educator, 96
- 26 June – Frederic Rzewski, American composer and pianist, 83
- 29 June – Robert Wykes, American composer, 95
- 1 July – Louis Andriessen, Dutch composer and pianist, 82
- 7 July – Donald Pippin, American opera impresario and administrator, 95
- 9 July – Gil Wechsler, American opera house lighting designer, 79
- 12 July – Adrian Tan, Singaporean conductor, 44
- 13 July
  - Joan Parets Serra, Catalan musicologist, 81
  - Guido Lamell, American violinist and conductor, 68
- 15 July – Jean Kraft, American mezzo-soprano, 94
- 17 July
  - Sir Graham Vick, British opera director, 67 (from COVID-19)
  - Edward Berkeley, American opera director, 76
  - Michael McClelland, American orchestral violinist, 62
- 23 July – Thierry Dran, French tenor, 67
- 26 July – André Tubeuf, French musicologist, 90
- 28 July – Giuseppe Giacomini, Italian tenor, 80
- 1 August – Kazimierz Kowalski, Polish bass and opera administrator, 70
- 3 August – Allan Stephenson, English-born South African composer, cellist, and conductor, 71
- 10 August – Stephen Wilkinson, British composer and choral conductor, 102
- 11 August – Gianluigi Gelmetti, Italian conductor, 75
- 13 August – Vladimir Mendelssohn, Romanian-born orchestral violist active in The Netherlands, 71
- 14 August
  - R. Murray Schafer, Canadian composer, 88
  - Hugh Wood, British composer, 89
  - Igor Oistrakh, Russian violinist, 90
- 19 August – Robert Cogan, American composer, theorist and teacher, 91
- 20 August – Michael Morgan, American conductor, 63
- 22 August
  - Charles Burles, French tenor, 85
  - Brian Culverhouse, British record producer, 93
- 25 August – James Orent, American violinist and conductor, 67
- 26 August – Marianne Blok, Panama-born Dutch soprano, 80
- 27 August – Siegfried Matthus, German composer, 87
- 28 August – Teresa Żylis-Gara, Polish soprano, 91
- 2 September
  - Michel Corboz, Swiss conductor, 87
  - Mikis Theodorakis, Greek composer, 96
- 5 September – Carmen Balthrop, American soprano, 73
- 7 September – Amanda Holden, British librettist, writer, translator and pianist, 73
- 15 September – Norman Bailey, British bass-baritone, 88
- 19 September
  - Sylvano Bussotti, Italian composer, 87
  - András Ligeti, Hungarian violinist and conductor, 68
- 22 September
  - Jean-Patrice Brosse, French harpsichordist and organist, 71
  - Jan Stanienda, Polish orchestral violinist, 68
- 28 September
  - Karan Armstrong, American soprano, 79
  - James Buswell, American violinist, 74
- 30 September
  - Carlisle Floyd, American composer, 95
  - Miah Im, Canada-born opera coach and academic pedagogue resident in the US, 47
- 1 October – Raymond Gniewek, American violinist and past concertmaster (leader) of the Metropolitan Opera Orchestra, 89
- 5 October – Manfred Hermann Schmid, German musicologist, 74
- 7 October – Clifford Grant, Australian bass, 90
- 9 October – Gilbert Py, French tenor, 87
- 10 October – Luis de Pablo, Spanish composer, 91
- 17 October – Carl Pini, UK-born Australian violinist, conductor and pedagogue, 87
- 18 October – Edita Gruberová. Slovak soprano, 74
- 20 October – Hans Haselböck, Austrian organist, composer, writer and pedagogue, 93
- 21 October – Bernard Haitink, Dutch conductor, 92
- 22 October – Udo Zimmermann, German composer, conductor and music administrator, 78
- 23 October – Alfredo Diez Nieto, Cuban composer, conductor and pedagogue, 102
- 29 October – Renato Zanettovich, Italian violinist and pedagogue, 100
- 31 October – Joan Carlyle, British soprano, 90
- 1 November – Nelson Freire, Brazilian pianist, 77
- 3 November – Joanna Bruzdowicz, Polish composer, 78
- 4 November – Mario Lavista, Mexican composer, 78
- 7 November – Béla Kovács, Hungarian clarinetist, 84
- 8 November – Franz Streitwieser, Germany-born trumpeter and collector of brass instruments resident in the US, 82
- 9 November – John Kinsella, Irish composer, 89
- 11 November – Aga Mikolaj, Polish soprano, 51 (from COVID-19)
- 18 November – Günter Neubert, German composer, 85
- 21 November – Gordon Crosse, British composer, 83
- 22 November – Evelinde Trenkner, German pianist, 88
- 28 November – Andrei Hoteev, Russian pianist, 74
- 30 November – Pamela Helen Stephen, British mezzo-soprano, 57
- 1 December – Alvin Lucier, American composer, 90
- 14 December – Karl Heinz Wahren, German composer and pianist, 88
- 19 December – Judith Davidoff, American cellist and specialist in early music, 94
- 21 December – George Alexander Albrecht, German conductor and composer, 86
- 31 December – Graham Pauncefort, British classical music recording executive and founder of the CRD label, 81

== Major awards ==
- 2021 Pulitzer Prize in Music: Tania León – Stride

=== Grammy Awards ===
- Best Chamber Music/Small Ensemble Performance: Contemporary Voices, Pacifica Quartet (Cedille Records)
- Best Choral Performance: Richard Danielpour – The Passion of Yeshua, James K. Bass, J'Nai Bridges, Timothy Fallon, Kenneth Overton, Hila Plitmann and Matthew Worth; Buffalo Philharmonic Orchestra; Buffalo Philharmonic Chorus and UCLA Chamber Singers; James K. Bass and Adam Luebke, chorus masters; JoAnn Falletta, conductor (Naxos)
- Best Classical Compendium: Michael Tilson Thomas – From the Diary of Anne Frank, Meditations on Rilke; Isabel Leonard; San Francisco Symphony; Michael Tilson Thomas, conductor; Jack Vad, producer (SFS Media)
- Best Classical Instrumental Solo: Christopher Theofanidis – Concerto for Viola and Chamber Orchestra, Richard O'Neill; Albany Symphony; David Alan Miller, conductor (Albany Records)
- Best Contemporary Classical Composition: Christopher Rouse – Symphony No. 5, Nashville Symphony; Giancarlo Guerrero, conductor (Naxos)
- Best Classical Solo Vocal Album: Dame Ethyl Smyth – The Prison, Sarah Brailey and Dashon Burton; Experiential Chorus; Experiential Orchestra; James Blachly, conductor (Chandos)
- Best Opera Recording: Gershwin – Porgy and Bess; Frederick Ballentine, Angel Blue, Denyce Graves, Latonia Moore, Eric Owens; The Metropolitan Opera Orchestra and Metropolitan Opera Chorus; David Robertson, conductor; David Frost, producer (Metropolitan Opera)
- Best Engineered Album, Classical: Shostakovich: Symphony No. 13 ('Babi Yar'); Alexey Tikhomirov; Chicago Symphony Orchestra; Men of the Chicago Symphony Chorus; Riccardo Muti, conductor; David Frost and Charlie Post, engineers; Silas Brown, mastering engineer (CSO Resound)
- Best Orchestral Performance: Ives – Complete Symphonies; Los Angeles Philharmonic; Gustavo Dudamel, conductor (Deutsche Grammophon)
- Producer of the Year, Classical: David Frost

=== Gramophone Classical Music Awards 2021 ===
- Chamber: Amy Beach, Edward Elgar – Piano Quintets; Takács Quartet and Garrick Ohlsson (Hyperion)
- Choral: Jan Ladislav Dussek – Messe Solemnelle; Stefanie True, Helen Charlston, Gwilym Bowen, Morgan Pearse; Choir of the AAM, Academy of Ancient Music, Richard Egarr (AAM Records)
- Concerto: Shostakovich – Violin Concertos; Alina Ibragimova, State Academic Symphony Orchestra of the Russian Federation, Vladimir Jurowski (Hyperion)
- Contemporary: John Pickard – The Gardener of Aleppo and other chamber works; Susan Bickley, The Nash Ensemble, Martyn Brabbins (BIS)
- Early Music: Josquin des Prez – Masses (Hercules Dux Ferrarie, D'ung aultre amer, Missa Faysant regretz); The Tallis Scholars and Peter Phillips (Gimell Records)
- Instrumental: Johann Sebastian Bach – Lute Suites; Sean Shibe (Delphian)
- Opera: Britten – Peter Grimes; Stuart Skelton, Erin Wall, Roderick Williams, Susan Bickley, Catherine Wyn-Rogers, Robert Murray, James Gilchrist, Marcus Farnsworth; Bergen Philharmonic Orchestra and Choir, Edward Gardner (Chandos)
- Orchestral: Franz Schmidt – Complete Symphonies; hr-Sinfonieorchester and Paavo Järvi (Deutsche Grammophon)
- Piano: Johann Sebastian Bach – The Well-Tempered Clavier , Book 2 (excerpts); Piotr Anderszewski (Warner Classics)
- Solo Vocal: El Nour (Gamal Abdel-Rahim, Berlioz, Bizet, Manuel de Falla, Philippe Gaubert, Federico García Lorca, Fernando Obradors, Ravel, José Serrano); Fatma Said, Malcolm Martineau, Rafael Aguirre, Burcu Karadağ, Tim Allhoff, Itamar Doari, Henning Sieverts, Tamer Pinarbasi, vision string quartet (Warner Classics)
- Voice and Ensemble: Verdi – Ludovic Tézier; Orchestra del Teatro Comunale di Bologna, Frédéric Chaslin (Sony Classical)
- Recording of the Year: Britten – Peter Grimes; Stuart Skelton, Erin Wall, Roderick Williams, Susan Bickley, Catherine Wyn-Rogers, Robert Murray, James Gilchrist, Marcus Farnsworth; Bergen Philharmonic Orchestra and Choir, Edward Gardner (Chandos)
- Artist of the Year: James Ehnes
- Concept Album: Cello 360; Christian-Pierre La Marca (Naïve)
- Label of the Year: Deutsche Grammophon
- Lifetime Achievement: Gundula Janowitz
- Orchestra of the Year: Minnesota Orchestra
- Spatial Audio: Josquin Des Prez – The Golden Renaissance; Stile Antico (Decca Classics)
- Special Achievement: Boston Modern Orchestra Project
- Young Artist of the Year: Fatma Said

=== Victoires de la musique Classique ===
- Recording of the Year: Beethoven – 'Around the World'; Quatuor Ebène (Erato)
- Artiste Lyrique: Julie Fuchs
- Instrumental soloist: Alexandre Tharaud
- Composer: Betsy Jolas – Topeng (for string quartet)
- Révélation Artiste Lyrique – Marie-Laure Garnier
- Révélation Soliste Instrumental – Aurélien Gignoux

=== Ivors Composer Awards ===
- Impact Award – Zoe Rahman
- Visionary Award – Sarah Angliss
- Innovation Award – Cleveland Watkiss
- Jazz Composition – Nikki Iles: The Caged Bird
- Large-Scale Composition – Anna Þorvaldsdóttir: Catamorphosis
- Outstanding Works Collection – Alexander Goehr
- Small Chamber Composition – Alex Paxton: Sometimes Voices
- Solo Composition – Martin Iddon: Lampades
- Sound Art – Caroline Kraabel: London 26 And 28 March 2020: Imitation: Inversion
- Vocal and Choral Composition – Thomas Adès: Gyökér (Root)
