= Carlos Pintado =

Cuban–American writer, playwright and poet

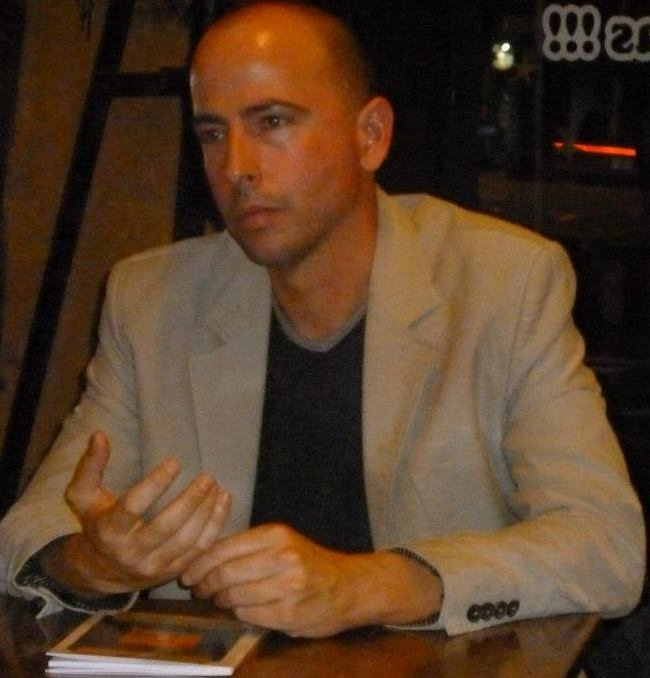
- Born: 1974 (age 51–52); Pinar del Río, Cuba
- Occupation: Author
- Writing career
- Genres: Poetry, fiction, plays, screenplay short stories
- Notable works: 2014 Paz Prize for Poetry, National Poetry Series, Sant Jordi's International Prize, Rimas Tropicales, Habitación a oscuras, Nine coins/Nueve monedas. Poem 'The Moon" was featured in The New York Times Magazine, selected by US Poet Laureate Natasha Tretheway
- Website: www.carlospintado.net

Carlos Pintado (born 1974 in Cuba) is a Cuban–American writer, playwright and award-winning poet who immigrated to the United States in the early 90s. He received the prestigious 2014 Paz Prize for Poetry for his book Nine coins/Nueve Monedas awarded by the National Poetry Series and published in a bilingual edition by Akashic Press. His book Autorretrato en azul received the Sant Jordi's International Prize for Poetry and his El azar y los tesoros was one of the finalists for Adonais Prize in 2008. He also contributed to the book The exile Experience: a journey to freedom, coordinated by Cuban American music producer Emilio Estefan. In September 2015, The New York Times Magazine published his poem "The moon", selected by US Poet Laureate Natasha Trethewey. Some of his works have been published on World Literature Today, The American Poetry Review, The New York Times, Raspa Magazine, among others.

In praising Pintado’s work, United States' Presidential Inaugural poet Richard Blanco has written: “The urgency and presence in Pintado’s poems feel as if the poet’s very life depended on writing them. They are possessed by a unique, intangible quality that arrests the reader and commands attention. His work is intimate yet boundless, moving easily between form and free verse, prose poems and long poems, whether capturing the everyday streets of Miami Beach or leading us into the mythic and mystical worlds of his imagination.”

In 2012, Carlos Pintado was one the judges of Gibara's Film Festival, along with Spanish singer and film maker Luis Eduardo Aute.

== Biography ==
In 2010, the South Beach Chamber Ensemble released the "Quintet on Carlos Pintado Poems" a piano and string quintet based on his poems with concerts throughout United States led by the American composer Pamela Marshall and director Michael Andrews. The author has been an invited artist to the White Night or Sleepless Night performing among several musicians and artists of recognized artistic career. Pintado practices Nichiren Buddhism since 2004 and is also a member of the worldwide Buddhist association Soka Gakkai International.

== Published works ==
- La Seducción del Minotauro (short stories, 2000)
- Los bosques de Mortefontaine (poetry, 2007)
- Habitación a oscuras (Sant Jordi International Prize for poetry, 2007)
- Los Nombres de la noche (poetry, 2008)
- El azar y los tesoros (poetry, 2008)
- El unicornio y otros poemas (Poetry Anthology, editorial Ruinas Circulares, Argentina, 2011)
- Cuaderno del falso amor impuro (Editorial Tigres de Papel, Madrid, Spain, 2014)
- Taubenschlag (Editorial Capiro, Santa Clara, Cuba, 2015).
- La sed del último que mira (Sudaquia Editores, New York,2015).
- Nine coins/Nueve monedas (Winner of The National Poetry Series' 2014 Paz Prize for Poetry. Akashic Books 2015).
- El árbol rojo ( Ediciones Furtivas, 2022).
- Instrucciones para matar un ciervo ( Ediciones Loynaz, 2023).
- Música para cuerdas de bambú/ Music for bamboo strings ( 2023 Sundial Literary Translation Award. Columbia University Press/Sundial House 2024 ).

== Awards and honors ==
- Haicuba/haikuba (North South, Simon & Schuster )
- 2015 Included in World Literature Today's annual year-end list of notable translations.
- 2015 finalist for the 2015–2016 CINTAS Foundation Fellowship in Creative Writing.
- 2015 His poem "The moon" was selected by United States Poet Laureate and Pulitzer winner, Natasha Trethewey to be the featured

poem of September's edition of The New York Times Magazine" and also listed among the 10 Best Poems of 2015 by Vancouver Poetry House.

- 2014 Recipient of 2014 Paz Prize for Poetry (The National Poetry Series). Judged by United States Inaugural poet Richard Blanco
- 2012 The San Francisco Girls Chorus sang his 'Rimas Tropicales".
- 2011 Idolos del sueño (piece for a soprano, clarinet, violin and piano, collaborated with CONTINUUM ENSemble in New York).
- 2010 Quinteto sobre los Poemas de Carlos Pintado" (Piano quintet interpreted by The South beach Music Ensemble based on his poems).
- 2007 Recipient of Sant Jordi International Prize for poetry.
- 2008 Shortlisted for Adonais International Prize for Poetry.

== Collaborations ==
- Rimas Tropicales ("Tropical Rhymes")

A collection of his poetry titled Tropical Rhymes had its World Premiere in San Francisco in June 2011, by the San Francisco Girls Chorus. Music accompanying the poems was composed by Tania León.

- "Idols of the dream"

Carlos Pintado's "Idolos del sueño" (Dream eidolons) was turned into a piece for a soprano, clarinet, violin, cello and piano by Ileana Perez-Velazquez, which was premiered in 2011 by Continuum at Kaufman Music Center.

The Exile Experience: A Journey to Freedom. Pintado was a contributor to this book, coordinated by Cuban American music producer Emilio Estefan.

Pintado has collaborated with Cuban musicians Gema and Pavel, as well as international superstar Francisco Céspedes and in 2009 participated along with actor and sculptor Michel Hernandez on the project 'The Invention of the senses", a fusion of poetry and sculptures which is now part of the OPEN SPACES/ ESPACIO ABIERTO catalog of Miami's Centro Cultural Español. Pintado is also a contributor writer of Free Soul Dance Company directed by Belma Suazo and international actor Francisco Gattorno.

His articles have appeared in Vogue magazine in Spanish.
