= Death Song (album) =

Studio album by the Black Angels
- Released: April 21, 2017
- Recorded: September 2016
- Studios: Arlyn Studios, Austin, Texas; Avast! Studios, Seattle, Washington; Electrokitty
- Genre: Psychedelic rock
- Length: 48:42
- Label: Partisan
- Producer: Phil Ek

The Black Angels chronology
Clear Lake Forest (2014)	Death Song (2017)	Wilderness of Mirrors (2022)

Singles from Death Song
- 1. "Currency" Released: February 10, 2017

Death Song is the fifth studio album by American psychedelic rock band The Black Angels released on April 21, 2017, 4 years after their last album Indigo Meadow. Recording took place during September 2016 at Arlyn, Avast! and Electrokitty Recording Studios. Phil Ek produced, mixed and engineered the album.

== Reception ==
Professional ratings
Aggregate scores
Source	Rating
Metacritic	75/100
Review scores
Source	Rating
AllMusic	3.5/5 stars
American Songwriter	3/5 stars
The A.V. Club	B
Paste	8.8/10 stars
The Skinny	4/5 stars

The album was released to generally favorable reviews scoring 75 on aggregate website Metacritic, based on 12 reviews. Giving the album 3.5 out of 5 stars, AllMusic critic Mark Deming said of the album "Death Song is an album that's big on cool sounds and not as strong in terms of songs (despite the title), and if you're searching for compelling melodies or hooks, this album may not be your cup of acid. But if you're in the market for an album that will summon the dark atmospheres, Death Song certainly delivers the goods, and it demonstrates that the Black Angels slowly but surely improve each time they go into the studio." Paste Magazine's Beverly Bryan gave the album 8.8 out of 10 in a rave review and said "...a dark, mysterious and sweeping record that returns to the combination of politics and mysticism that made their gritty anti-war themed first album Passover so fascinating.

== Track listing ==
Death Song track listing
No.	Title	Length
1.	"Currency"	5:16
2.	"I'd Kill for Her"	3:37
3.	"Half Believing"	4:19
4.	"Comanche Moon"	4:51
5.	"Hunt Me Down"	3:53
6.	"Grab as Much (As You Can)"	3:51
7.	"Estimate"	5:09
8.	"I Dreamt"	4:22
9.	"Medicine"	3:31
10.	"Death March"	3:24
11.	"Life Song"	6:29
Total length:		48:42

== Personnel ==
=== The Black Angels ===
- Alex Maas – lead vocals, bass, harmonium
- Christian Bland – guitar, Mellotron, bass, vocals, Vox Continental
- Jake Garcia – guitar, bass, vocals
- Kyle Hunt – bass, guitar, Moog synthesizer, Rheem MK VII organ
- Stephanie Bailey – drums, percussion, Philicorda

=== Technical and design personnel ===
- Phil Ek – engineering, mixing, producing
- Greg Calbi – mastering
- Joe Hogyn – assistant engineer
- Cameron Nicklaus – assistant engineer
- Jacob Sciba – assistant ebgineer
- Pierre Schmidt – album artwork

== Charts ==
Chart performance for Death Song
Chart (2017)	Peak position
Belgian Albums (Ultratop Flanders)	79
Belgian Albums (Ultratop Wallonia)	40
Dutch Albums (Album Top 100)	78
French Albums (SNEP)	92
Swiss Albums (Schweizer Hitparade)	73
UK Albums Chart	68
US Billboard 200	94
