= Wilderness of Mirrors =

Wilderness of Mirrors may refer to:

- "Wilderness of mirrors", a phrase from the poem "Gerontion" by T. S. Eliot
- Wilderness of Mirrors (Lawrence English album), 2014
- Wilderness of Mirrors (The Black Angels album), 2022
- Wilderness of Mirrors (Myrath album), 2026
- A Wilderness of Mirrors, a book by Max Frisch
