= Wilderness of Mirrors (Lawrence English album) =

Studio album by Lawrence English
- Released: 21 July 2014
- Genre: Ambient; drone
- Length: 39:08
- Label: Room40
- Producer: Lawrence English

Lawrence English chronology
Suikinkutsu No Katawara Ni (2013)	Wilderness of Mirrors (2014)	Approaching Nothing (2016)

Wilderness of Mirrors is a studio album by Australian record producer Lawrence English. It was released on 21 July 2014 through Room40. It received universal acclaim from critics.

== Background ==
During the making of the album, Lawrence English drew inspiration from live performances by the bands Earth, Swans, and My Bloody Valentine. The album's tracks were written with the "live experience of listening" in mind. It took him two years to finish the album. The album's title originates from T. S. Eliot's poem "Gerontion". A music video was released for the track "Forgiving Noir". The album was released on 21 July 2014 through his record label Room40.

== Critical reception ==
Professional ratings
Aggregate scores
Source	Rating
Metacritic	82/100
Review scores
Source	Rating
Fact	4/5 stars
MusicOMH	4/5 stars
Pitchfork	7.5/10
The Skinny	4/5 stars
Tiny Mix Tapes	4/5 stars

According to the review aggregator Metacritic, Wilderness of Mirrors received "universal acclaim" based on a weighted average score of 82 out of 100 from 6 critic scores.

Brian Howe of Pitchfork stated, "Wilderness of Mirrors isn't groundbreaking in general, but it is new territory for the often-cerebral English, and he puts an engaging, commanding stamp on this style of ambient overdrive hymn." Maya Kalev of Fact commented that "Drone albums are by their nature immersive, but it's rare to come across one so tempestuous, evocative and compelling from start to finish as Wilderness of Mirrors."

Gary Kaill of The Skinny wrote, "Built from almost intangible elements, Wilderness of Mirrors' aural scree is equal parts harmony and discord." He added, "Its inarguable aesthetic makes for a listening experience as unsettling as it is exhilarating." Pat Beane of Tiny Mix Tapes commented that "English makes us feel in our gut his sense of something-gone-wrong, which is central to our experience listening to this album." He added, "To that end, he uses bass tones and shrill distortion to shake up the listener."

=== Accolades ===
Year-end lists for Wilderness of Mirrors
Publication	List	Rank	Ref.
Fact	The 50 Best Albums of 2014	21	

== Track listing ==
All tracks are written by Lawrence English.

Wilderness of Mirrors track listing
No.	Title	Length
1.	"The Liquid Casket"	6:20
2.	"Wilderness of Mirrors"	2:37
3.	"Guillotines and Kingmakers"	2:02
4.	"Another Body"	6:26
5.	"Wrapped in Skin"	3:18
6.	"Forgiving Noir"	8:25
7.	"Graceless Hunter"	5:10
8.	"Hapless Gatherer"	4:47
Total length:		39:08

== Personnel ==
Credits adapted from liner notes.

- Lawrence English – production
- Vanessa Tomlinson – bass drum (2), tam tam (5)
- James Plotkin – mastering
- Traianos Pakioufakis – design
- Edward Steichen – cover photography
