= Robert Keen =

Robert Keen may refer to:

- Robert Earl Keen (born 1956), American country singer-songwriter and entertainer
- Robert J. Keen (1923–1992), American flying ace
- Bob Keen (born 1960), British film director

== See also ==
- Bob Keane (1922–2009), American musician and music producer
- Bob Keene (1919–2010), American football player
- Robert Keane (disambiguation)
