= Better Off Alone (disambiguation) =

"Better Off Alone" is a 1998 single by Alice Deejay.

Better Off Alone may also refer to:

- Better Off Alone, a 1999 EP by Bullet for My Valentine, or its title track
- "Better Off Alone" (Grinspoon song), a 2004 single
- Better Off Alone, a 2011 EP by Friends, now known as Better Off
- "Better Off Alone", 1996 song by Wang Lee Hom from album "If You Heard My Song"
- "Better Off Alone", 1977 single by Jan Howard
- "Better Off Alone", 1986 single by The Good Brothers from album Delivering the Goods''
- "Better Off Alone", 2007 single by The Black Angels from Passover
- "Better Off Alone", 2007 song by Katharine McPhee from Katharine McPhee
- "Better Off (Alone, Pt. III)", 2023 single by Alan Walker, Dash Berlin and Vikkstar
- Better Off Alone (album), a 2024 album by A Boogie wit da Hoodie
