= Raft (album) =

Studio album by Mike Cooper
- Released: 7 July 2017
- Length: 37:06
- Label: Room40

Mike Cooper chronology
Sky Songs (2016)	Raft (2017)	Tropical Gothic (2018)

Raft is a solo studio album by English guitarist Mike Cooper. It was released on 7 July 2017 through Room40. It received generally favorable reviews from critics.

== Background ==
Raft is specifically inspired by the sailors Vital Alsar and William Wills. A music video was released for the track "Raft 21 – Guayaquil to Tully".

== Critical reception ==
Professional ratings
Aggregate scores
Source	Rating
Metacritic	74/100
Review scores
Source	Rating
Pitchfork	6.8/10
Record Collector	4/5 stars
Spectrum Culture	4/5 stars
Tiny Mix Tapes	4/5 stars

According to the review aggregator Metacritic, Raft received "generally favorable reviews" based on a weighted average score of 74 out of 100 from 6 critic scores.

Will Neibergall of Tiny Mix Tapes stated, "In a changing and frustrating world where everything solid seems to fall into aqueous mixture, Mike Cooper is still afloat, his guitar tied tightly to his lap with patch cords, so talented as always at finding another raft." He added, "[Raft] may seem conceptually like a retrospective or statement of purpose, and it holds up nicely as a portrait, but it should also be considered a refinement, wading further away from readymade images of the tropics and into the depth of the traveler's imagination." Andy Beta of Pitchfork commented that "Glints of old country blues, slack-key guitarist Gabby Pahinui, Fripp & Eno's (No Pussyfooting), or the KLF's Chill Out might all come to mind, but if Cooper's varied and voluminous catalog tells us anything, these are all just tributaries flowing into the man's particular ocean of sound." Daniel Bromfield of Spectrum Culture called the album "an intensely evocative and pleasurable listen, even if it's a bit short."

=== Accolades ===
Year-end lists for Raft
Publication	List	Rank	Ref.
Crack	The Top 100 Albums of 2017	46	

== Track listing ==
Raft track listing
No.	Title	Length
1.	"Raft 21 – Guayaquil to Tully"	4:06
2.	"Raft 37 – Las Balsas"	12:12
3.	"Raft 28 – Vital Alsar"	2:47
4.	"Raft 33 – Malama Honua (To Care for Our Earth)"	4:08
5.	"Raft 29 – Honey Hunters"	5:19
6.	"Raft 36 – Age Unlimited"	3:48
7.	"Raft 27 – Guayaquil to Ballina"	4:41
Total length:		37:06
