= Robert Keane =

Robert Keane may refer to:

- Robert Emmett Keane (1883–1981), American actor
- Robert Angus Keane (1914–1977), Canadian military officer
- Bob Keane (1922–2009), American music producer
- Robert Keane (composer) (active 2021), classical music composer in 2021 in classical music
- Robbie Keane (born 1980), Irish professional footballer

== See also ==
- Robert Kean (1893–1980), New Jersey congressman
- Robert Keen (disambiguation)
