= Directions to See a Ghost =

Studio album by The Black Angels
- Released: April 15, 2008
- Recorded: May 2006 – November 2007
- Studio: Cacophony Studios, Austin, TX
- Genre: Psychedelic rock
- Length: 70:25
- Label: Light in the Attic Records
- Producer: Erik Wofford

The Black Angels chronology
Passover (2006)	Directions to See a Ghost (2008)	Phosphene Dream (2010)

Singles from Directions to See a Ghost
- 1. "Doves" Released: May 20, 2008

Professional ratings
Aggregate scores
Source	Rating
Metacritic	68/100
Review scores
Source	Rating
AllMusic	3.5/5 stars
Blender	4.5/5 stars
Drowned In Sound	(6/10)
Pitchfork Media	(6.6/10)
PopMatters	(8/10)
Prefix Magazine	(9.0/10)
The Times	3/5 stars
Twisted Ear	4.5/5 stars
World of Music	5/5 stars

Directions to See a Ghost is the second album from rock band The Black Angels. It was released digitally on April 15, 2008 by Light in the Attic Records. However, it was not until May 13 that the CD and 3xLP were released. Those who purchased the album digitally were given a code to download the album. On or after the date of release, it was to be brought back to the place of purchase in exchange for a hard copy of the album as well as a bonus four-song EP Black Angel Exit. Moreover, Directions to See a Ghost features the song "Doves" also available on the "Doves" single 7" released the same day. Unlike the CD, the 3xLP contains bonus tracks "Surf City (Revisited)" and "Paladin's Last Stand."

The group signed to the label Suretone, owned by Interscope, for releases after this album.

Prefix called it "an easy candidate for one of the best records of the year".

According to Rolling Stone columnist David Fricke "...tripsters the Black Angels bring the aura of mid-1966 - the drilling guitars of early Velvet Underground shows, the raga inflections of late-show Fillmore jams, the acid-prayer stomp of Austin avatars the 13th Floor Elevators - everywhere they go, including the levitations on their second album, Directions to See a Ghost (Light in the Attic). Mid-Eighties echoes of Spacemen 3 and the Jesus and Mary Chain also roll through the scoured-guitar sustain and Alex Maas' rocker-monk incantations."

== Track listing ==
No.	Title	Length
1.	"You on the Run"	4:53
2.	"Doves"	4:29
3.	"Science Killer"	4:45
4.	"Mission District"	5:12
5.	"18 Years"	5:25
6.	"Deer-Ree-Shee"	5:49
7.	"Never/Ever"	8:34
8.	"Vikings"	4:38
9.	"You in Color"	5:52
10.	"The Return"	4:31
11.	"Snake in the Grass"	16:13

Bonus tracks

1. "Black Angel Exit/Shine" [iTunes]
2. "Surf City (Revisited)" [LP]
3. "Paladin's Last Stand" [LP]
4. "No Satisfaction" [LP]

== Personnel ==
The Black Angels

- Stephanie Bailey – drums, percussion, bass
- Christian Bland – guitar, vocals, bass, drums
- Alex Maas – vocals, bass, rogue sitar, organ
- Jennifer Raines – Vox Jaguar organ, drone machine
- Nate Ryan – guitar, bass
- Kyle Hunt – bass, guitar, drums, organ

Production

- Erik Wofford – recording, mixing
- Dave Cooley – mastering
- Maya Boboia – artwork

== In popular culture ==
- "You on the Run" was featured in the 2009 film The Limits of Control.
- "Mission District" was featured in the "Dramatics, Your Honor" episode of the TV Series The Good Wife (2014).
- "Mission District" was featured in the "F is for Fire" episode of the TV Series Evil (2021).
- "Science Killer" was featured in the 2013 TV Series Longmire (S02E02).
- "Science Killer" was featured in the "A Material World" episode of the TV Series The Good Wife (2014).
