= Lawrence English =

Australian composer, artist, and curator

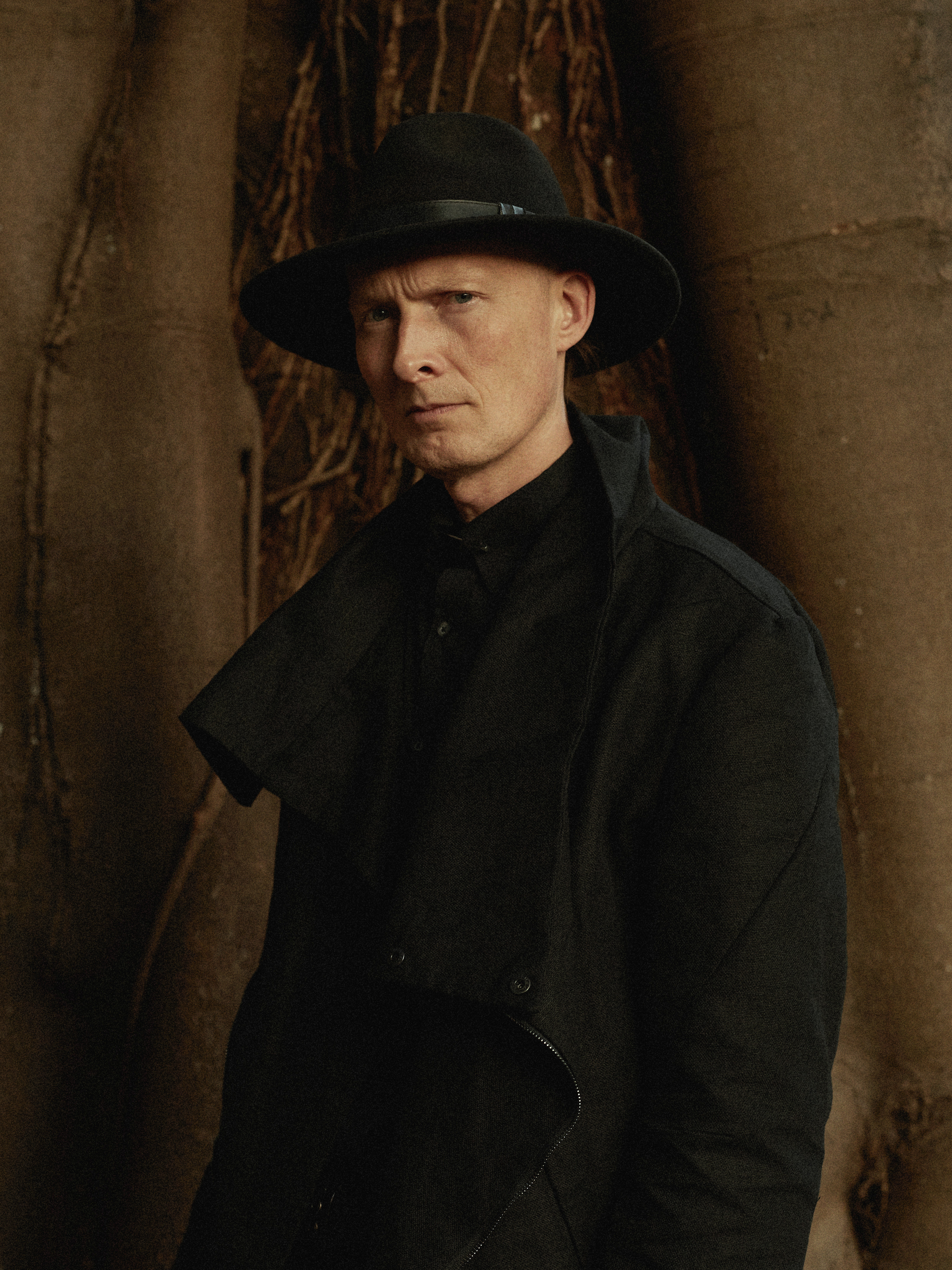
- English in 2023

Background information
- Born: 2 July 1976; Brisbane, Queensland, Australia
- Education: Queensland University of Technology (BA, MA, PhD)
- Occupations: Composer; artist; curator
- Years active: 2004–present
- Labels: Important; Room40
- Website: lawrenceenglish.com

Lawrence English (born 1976) is an Australian composer, artist, and curator from Brisbane. His work is broadly concerned with the politics of perception, specifically he is interested in the nature of listening, and sounds' capability to occupy the body. He is the director of the imprint Room40, which was founded in 2000. He and Jamie Stewart from Xiu Xiu have an ongoing collaboration named Hexa.

== Sound works ==
English's music is recognised as exploring "environmental and musical sources and is highly regarded for its intelligent invocation of perception, memory and space". On his 2014 album Wilderness of Mirrors, he outlines his approach to composition "For me it's about a kind of struggle between almost nothing and almost everything. Sometimes one sound can be too much and other times 50 layers seems lacking in the depth you want to convey. I think at the heart of this question is dynamics, and I feel that's very much what this album is about. It's a slow reveal, I want it to be a seduction."

He cites childhood experiences birdwatching for reed warbler with his father as the starting point for his interest in sound in space. He has stated, "If you just looked in the reeds you'd see nothing. If you listened you got an idea of space and a sense of where it might be, then you understood it. That's probably my first experience with these ideas of space and sound, which are basically the fundamental building blocks of what I've been interested in since then." These experiences have led to a long engagement with field recordings, and more recently the development of theoretical approaches to the practice including his Relational Listening theory. He set out the framework of relational listening in his doctoral thesis, The listener's listening (Queensland University of Technology, 2017), for which he received an outstanding doctoral thesis award.

He also released Cruel Optimism (2017) and Even the Horizon Knows Its Bounds (2025).

== Discography ==
=== Studio albums ===
Title	Details
Transit	Release date: 2004; Label: Cajid Media (cajid 003CD)
Happiness Will Befall	Release date: 2005; Label: Crónica (Crónica 022)
Autumn	Release date: 2005; Label: Autumn Records (leaf 022)
Plateau (with Ai Yamamoto)	Release date: 2007; Label: Phono-Statique Records (P-S 007)
Merola Shoulders (with Domenico Sciajno)	Release date: 2007; Label: Phono-Statique Records (P-S 008)
For Varying Degrees of Winter	Release date: 2007; Label: Baskaru (KARU7)
Kiri No Oto	Release date: 2008; Label: Touch (Tone 31)
Studies for Stradbroke	Release date: 2008; Label: Winds Measure (wm11)
Euphonia (with Tom Hall)	Release date: 2008; Label: Presto!? (P!?003)
U (with Tujiko Noriko & John Chantler)	Release date: 2008; Label: Room40 (RM435)
HB (with Francisco López)	Release date: January 2009; Label: Baskaru (KARU:13)
A Colour for Autumn	Release date: 2009; Label: 12k (12K1052)
It's Up to Us to Live	Release date: 2009; Label: Sirr (SIRR 0032)
A Path Less Travelled (with Minamo)	Release date: 2010; Label: Room40 (RM427)
And the Lived in	Release date: 2012; Label: Room40 (DRM420)
Songs of the Living	Release date: 2012; Label: Room40 (DRM420)
For / Not for John Cage	Release date: 2012; Label: Line (LINE_058)
Lonely Women's Club	Release date: 2013; Label: Important Records (IMPREC367)
Suikinkutsu No Katawara Ni	Release date: 2013; Label: Winds Measure Recordings (wm35)
Wilderness of Mirrors	Release date: 2014; Label: Room40 (RM460)
A Path Less Travelled (with Stephen Vitiello)	Release date: November 2014; Label: Dragon's Eye Recordings (der009)
Shadow of the Monolith (with Werner Dafeldecker)	Release date: November 2014; Label: Holotype Editions (HOLO2)
Approaching Nothing	Release date: 2016; Label: Baskaru (karu:40)
Cruel Optimism	Release date: 2017; Label: Room40 (RM470)
Immediate Horizon (with Alessandro Cortini)	Release date: 2018; Label: Important Records (IMPREC466)
Selva Oscura (with William Basinski)	Release date: 2018; Label: Temporary Residence Limited (TRR312)
Lassitude	Release date: 2020; Label: Room40 (RM401)
Field Recordings from the Zone	Release date: 2020; Label: Boomkat Editions (BKEDITDS011)
Observation of Breath	Release date: September 2021; Label: Hallow Ground (HG2103)
Viento	Release date: 8 April 2022; Label: Room40 (RM4190)
Eternal Stalker (with Merzbow)	Release date: 3 June 2022; Label: Dais Records (DAIS192)
Colours of Air (with Loscil)	Release date: 3 February 2023; Label: Kranky (KRANK236)
Chthonic	Release date: 11 August 2023
Even the Horizon Knows Its Bounds	Release date: 31 January 2025; Label: Room40 (RM4245)
Trinity (with Stephen Vitiello)	Release date: 21 November 2025; Label: American Dreams Records (85ADR)

== Awards ==
=== Queensland Music Awards ===
The Queensland Music Awards (previously known as Q Song Awards) are annual awards celebrating Queensland, Australia's brightest emerging artists and established legends. They commenced in 2006.

Year	Nominee / work	Award	Result (wins only)
2008	"Watching It Unfold"	Electronic song of the Year	Won
