= The Black Angels (band) =

American psychedelic rock band

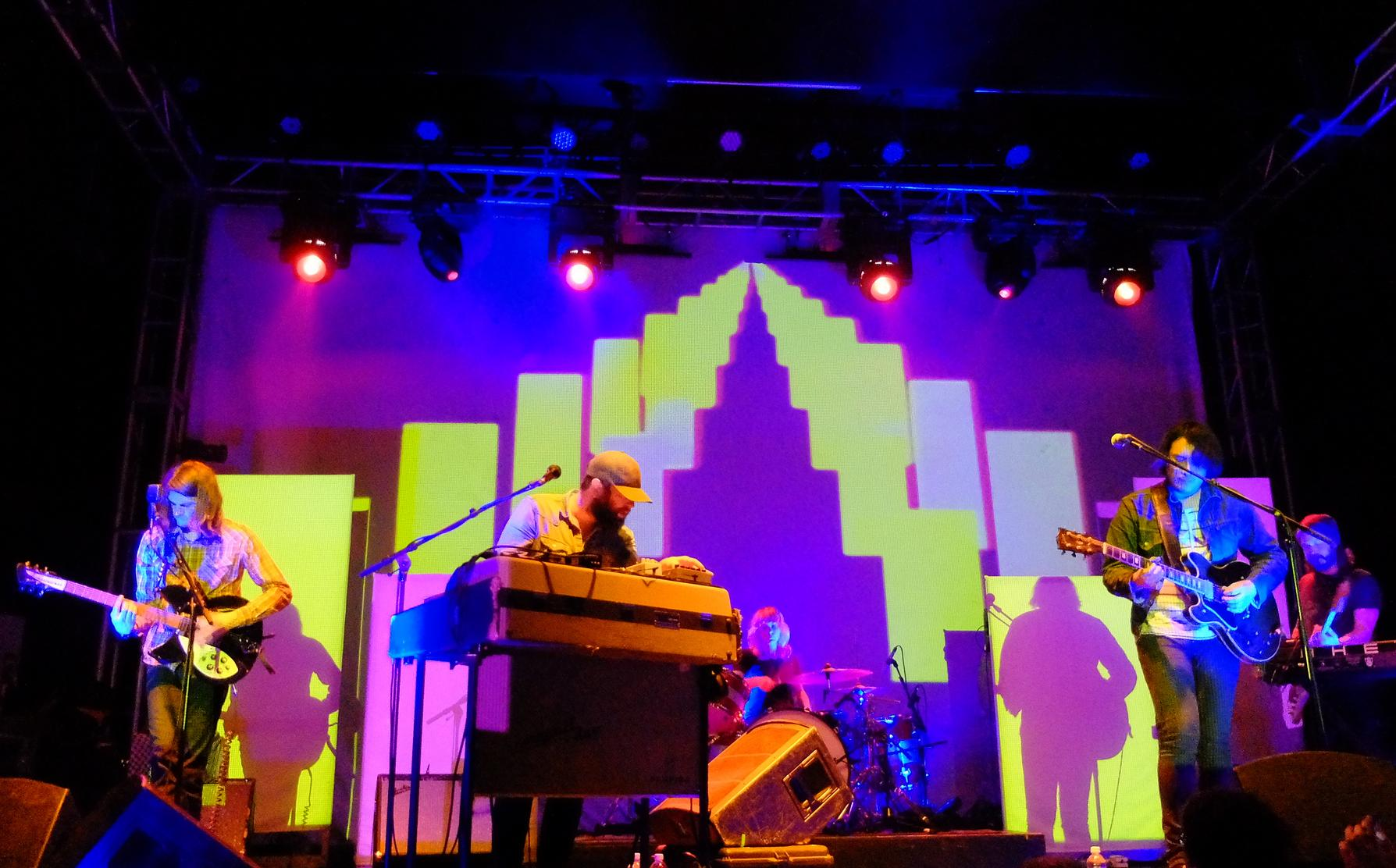
- The Black Angels live in Texas 2014

Background information
- Origin: Austin, Texas, United States
- Genres: Psychedelic rock; neo-psychedelia; garage rock
- Years active: 2004–present
- Labels: Light in the Attic; Blue Horizon; Partisan
- Members: Stephanie Bailey; Christian Bland; Alex Maas; Jake Garcia; Misti Hamrick-French
- Past members: Kyle Hunt; Nate Ryan; Jennifer Raines; Todd Keller
- Website: Official website

The Black Angels are an American psychedelic rock band from Austin, Texas. Formed in May 2004, they took their name from the Velvet Underground's "The Black Angel's Death Song". They have released six studio albums and one compilation album.

== History ==
=== Early Years (2004–2005) ===
In 2005, the Black Angels were featured on a dual-disc compilation album of psychedelic music called Psychedelica Vol. 1 from Northern Star Records. This, along with the growing popularity of their MySpace page, gave the band a jump in popularity in the underground scene.

=== Passover and Directions to See a Ghost (2006–2009) ===
The group's debut LP, Passover, released in 2006, was generally well received in the underground independent rock community and was noted for its dark tones and lyrical content. A review of Passover described them as "Walking in the shadows cast by Spiritualized mastermind Jason Pierce," invoking "dirges" reminiscent of the 13th Floor Elevators. Passover included a quote in the liner notes from Edvard Munch: "Illness, insanity, and death are the black angels that kept watch over my cradle and accompanied me all my life." The band was featured on the soundtrack of the 2007 Kevin Bacon movie, Death Sentence, on the second episode of FOX's Fringe, and in the ninth episode of Californication.

They released their second album Directions to See a Ghost in 2008. Songs from Directions to See a Ghost were also featured in The History Channel's 2009 documentary, Manson. Their song "Young Men Dead" was featured on the March 17, 2010 episode of UFC Primetime, "St. Pierre vs. Hardy", on Spike. "Young Men Dead" was also included on the soundtrack for the 2011 snowboard movie The Art of Flight. "Young Men Dead" was used in the soundtrack for the 2020 video game The Last of Us: Part II.

Festival appearances by the band during this time included Lollapalooza 2007, SXSW 2006 & 2008, and All Tomorrow's Parties 2008, among others. Touring partners included the blues rock band The Black Keys, Black Rebel Motorcycle Club, The Warlocks, Roky Erickson, The Brian Jonestown Massacre, Queens of the Stone Age, The Raveonettes, Wolfmother, and The Horrors.

Between October 28 and November 2, 2008, the band performed as Roky Erickson's backing band on the West Coast. The band featured on Unkle's May 2010 release, Where Did the Night Fall, collaborating on a song called "Natural Selection".

=== Phosphene Dream, Indigo Meadow, and Death Song (2010–present) ===
On April 23–25, 2010, The Reverberation Appreciation Society and the Black Angels presented their third annual music-and-arts festival, Austin Psych Fest. Bands topping the 43-band bill included The Raveonettes, Pink Mountaintops, The Warlocks, The Gaslamp Killer, Warpaint, Night Beats, and Silver Apples.

The band's third album, Phosphene Dream, was released on September 14, 2010. The group played the ATP New York 2010 Music Festival in Monticello, New York, in September 2010. On Record Store Day 2011 a 12" LP titled Another Nice Pair was released, a limited edition red LP containing the band's first two EPs. Of the total records pressed, 100 were randomly inserted with a print signed by Alex Maas, Stephanie Bailey, Christian Bland, Kyle Hunt, and Nate Ryan.

The 4th annual Austin Psych Fest ran from April 29 – May 1, 2011, and was held at the Seaholm Powerplant (the last event to be held inside the building) and featured Roky Erickson, Spectrum, Omar Rodriguez Lopez Group, Atlas Sound, Black Moth Super Rainbow, Prefuse 73 and A Place To Bury Strangers topping a lineup of 55 bands.

The band's fourth album, Indigo Meadow, was released on April 2, 2013, and they embarked on a tour across the United States in May 2013 in support of the album.

In February 2014, the Black Angels recorded a version of "Soul Kitchen" for A Psych Tribute to the Doors, released by Cleopatra Records.

The 7th annual Austin Psych Fest was held during May 2–4, 2014 at Carson Creek Ranch next to the Colorado River and featured a rare Friday night performance from the legendary 1960s baroque pop band The Zombies, The Dandy Warhols and The Brian Jonestown Massacre performing together on the same stage, the psychedelic folk band Quilt, the electronica duo Peaking Lights, Temples, Sleepy Sun, The War on Drugs, Loop, and an incendiary performance from Japanese drone rock band Acid Mothers Temple in which several instruments were lit on fire.

On July 22, 2014, the Black Angels released their EP, Clear Lake Forest.

In December 2014, the Black Angels released a split single, along with Sonic Jesus, called "Molly Moves My Generation".

The 8th annual Austin Psych Fest, now renamed Levitation, was held from May 8–10, 2015 at Carson Creek Ranch and featured an impressive lineup, including a rare 50th anniversary reunion of pioneering Texas psychedelic rock band The 13th Floor Elevators, The Flaming Lips, Tame Impala, The Jesus and Mary Chain's 30th anniversary performance of Psychocandy in its entirety, Spiritualized, Primal Scream, and Earth. Melody's Echo Chamber and Rose Windows were scheduled to perform, but Rose Windows announced their breakup prior to the event and Melody's Echo Chamber had travel issues and had to cancel.

The band released their fifth album, Death Song, in April 2017. They released their sixth album, Wilderness of Mirrors, on September 16, 2022.

In Fall 2027 the band embarked on a 20th anniversary tour for their debut album Passover.

== Logo ==
Logo

Besides the band's name, the Velvet Underground are also referred to in the band's logo, which incorporates a high-contrast negative image of the Velvet Underground's vocalist, Nico.

== Band members ==
Current

- Alex Maas – lead vocals, bass, organ, guitar, percussion, flute, Mellotron (2004–present)
- Christian Bland – guitars, bass, keys, vocals, occasional drums, organ, harmonium, autoharp, electric piano, celeste, Mellotron (2004–present)
- Stephanie Bailey – drums, percussion, occasional bass (2004–present)
- Jake Garcia – guitars, bass, vocals, Mellotron (2016–present)
- Misti Hamrick – bass, organ (2024–present)

Former

- Nate Ryan – bass, guitars, vocals, organ, electric autoharp, occasional drums (2004–2011)
- Jennifer Raines – drone machine/organ, keyboards, percussion (2004–2008)
- Todd Keller – guitars (2004–2005)
- Rachel Staggs (aka Rachel Goldstar) – bass, vocals (2004)
- Kyle Hunt – guitars, bass, keyboards, percussion (2006–2016)
- Ramiro Verdooren – guitar, bass, keyboards, vocals, harmonica, percussion (2019–2023)

== Side projects ==
- World Destroyers' Pleasure Club (Nate Ryan [aka Neight Trion], Rocky of Death Valley Girls, Jay Eraser from Grooms & others)
- The Shine Brothers (Nate Ryan, Oakley Munson of Black Lips, Colin Ryan, Ryan Rapsys)
- The Viet Minh
- Christian Bland & The Revelators
- The UFO Club (Christian Bland, Lee Blackwell of Night Beats & others)
- Sweet Tea
- Mien (Alex Maas, John Mark Lapham of The Earlies, Rishi Dhir of Elephant Stone and Tom Furse (aka Tom Cowan) of The Horrors)
- The Welly Welly Wells
- The Rotten Mangos
- The Hollow Trees

== Discography ==
=== Albums ===
List of albums, with selected details and chart positions
| Title | Album details | Peak chart positions | | |
| Title | Album details | US | FRA | UK |
|---|---|---|---|---|
| Passover | Released: 2006; Label: Light in the Attic | — | — | — |
| Directions to See a Ghost | Released: 2008; Label: Light in the Attic | — | 108 | — |
| Phosphene Dream | Released: 2010; Label: Blue Horizon | 52 | 52 | — |
| Indigo Meadow | Released: 2013; Label: Blue Horizon | 64 | 108 | — |
| Death Song | Released: 2017; Label: Partisan | 94 | 92 | 68 |
| Wilderness of Mirrors | Released: 2022; Label: Partisan | — (Note: Wilderness of Mirrors did not chart on the Billboard 200, but reached 34 on the Top Album Sales chart.) | 122 | — |

=== Compilations ===
- Another Nice Pair (Light in the Attic Records, compilation of first two EPs, 2011)

=== EPs ===
- The Black Angels (Light in the Attic Records, 2005)
- Black Angel Exit (Light in the Attic Records, 2008)
- Phosgene Nightmare (Blue Horizon, 2011)
- Clear Lake Forest (Blue Horizon, 2014)

=== Singles ===
- "The First Vietnamese War" b/w "Nine Years" (released August 21, 2006)
- "Better Off Alone" b/w "Yesterday Always Knows" (released May 28, 2007)
- "Doves" b/w "Drone in G# Major" (released May 20, 2008)
- "Telephone" (released August 3, 2010)
- "Watch Out Boy" b/w "I'd Rather Be Lonely" (released April 21, 2012)
- "Don't Play With Guns" (released January 22, 2013)
- "Molly Moves My Generation" (released December 1, 2014)
- "Waterloo Waltz" (released January 20, 2015)
- "Currency" (released February 10, 2017)
- "El Jardín" (June 2022)
