= The Black Angels (EP) =

EP by The Black Angels
- Released: October 18, 2005
- Studio: Wire Recording, Austin, TX; Shh! Recording, San Antonio, TX; Cacophony Recorders, Austin, TX
- Genre: Psychedelic rock
- Label: Light In The Attic Records

The Black Angels chronology
The Black Angels (2005)	Passover (2006)

Professional ratings
Review scores
Source	Rating
AllMusic	link

The Black Angels is the debut EP released by psychedelic rock band The Black Angels in October 2005 on the Light In The Attic Records label.

== Track listing ==
1. "Black Grease" - 4:35
2. "The First Vietnamese War" - 3:33
3. "Winter '68" - 2:41
4. "Manipulation" - 5:57

== Appearances ==
- "Black Grease" is heard on the fictional radio station Vinewood Boulevard Radio in the 2013 action-adventure video game Grand Theft Auto V.
- "The First Vietnamese War" was featured in the 2012 third-person shooter video game Spec Ops: The Line.

== Personnel ==
The Black Angels

- Alex Maas – vocals, bass
- Christian Bland – guitar, vocals, keys
- Jennifer Raines – drone machine/organ
- Nate Ryan – bass, guitar
- Stephanie Bailey – drums, percussion

Additional musician

- Todd Keller – guitar on "Black Grease" and "Manipulation"

Production

- Ross Ingram – engineer at Wire Recording, and Shh! Recording
- Erik Wofford – engineer at Cacophony Recorders
- Micajah Ryan – mastering at Blue Heaven Studio
