= Vanessa Tomlinson =

Australian artist and composer

- Born: 1971 (age 54–55); Australia
- Education: University of Adelaide, University of California, San Diego
- Known for: Clocked Out Duo
- Notable work: “Sonic Dreams”
- Website: vanessatomlinson.com

Vanessa Tomlinson (born 1971) is an Australian percussionist, composer, artistic director and educator. She is Director of Creative Arts Research Institute and Head of Percussion at Griffith University and has produced 150 publications. She is the co-founder and co-artistic director of Clocked Out, along with Erik Griswold.

== Career ==
In 1993 Tomlinson was awarded a recording contract with Etcetera Records, and won two awards for her percussion.

Upon completing her degree in Adelaide, Tomlinson studied with Bernhard Wulff and Robert van Sice at Musikhochschule Freiburg, Germany. She then moved to San Diego to complete a Masters under Steven Schick, and completed a Doctor Of Musical Arts in 2000.

Since 2000 she has collaborated with her partner Erik Griswold and released several albums together as Clocked Out Duo. They won two Green Room Awards for their collaboration Dada Cabare in 2000, and later won the Award for Excellence by an Organisation or Individual and Queensland State Award at 2011's APRA and AMC Art Music Awards for their work as Clocked Out.

In 2017 Tomlinson began a collaboration titled TOMLIN | FERGUS with Dr John Ferguson, an academic at the Queensland Conservatorium of Music where Tomlinson also taught.

In 2018 Tomlinson released her debut solo album The Space Inside on Room40 on cassette tape. She was an artist-in-residence at The Smithsonian Institution as part of its 2019 Year of Music, coining the term 'soundings' "to describe the way a musician activates a place or space". In 2020 Tomlinson initiated the 84 Pianos: Pandemic Edition project with Erik Griswold.

In October 2025, Tomlinson was announced as the new Director of the Queensland Conservatorium.

== Discography ==
2019 - Pateras Collected Works Vol. II (2005-2018) Immediata

2018 - The Space Inside Room40

2017 - Ephemoral Rivers Hat Hut Records

2017 - Water Pushes Sand Jazzhead Records

2015 - Time Crystals Innova Records

2015 - Daughters Fever Hellosquare Recordings

2010 - From Small Things Grow Clocked Out

2010 - fish boast of fishing Listen Hear Collective

2010 - Foreign Objects Clocked Out

2007 - Wide Alley Clocked Out

2006 - Xenakis Complete Percussion Works Mode

2004 - Mutant Theatre Tzadik

2002 - Water Pushes Sand Clocked Out

2000 - Every Night the Same Dream Clocked Out

1997 - Ferneyhough Solo Works Etcetera

== Awards ==
Year	Award	Work	Status
2018	Art Music Awards: QLD Award for Excellence in Experimental Music	100 Ways to Listen with Leah Barclay and John Ferguson	Winner
2018	Art Music Awards: NSW Award for Excellence in a Regional Area	Tyalgum Music Festival	Winner
2018	Art Music Awards: WA Award for Excellence in Performance	Never tilt your chair	Winner
2017	Art Music Award: National Award for Excellence in Experimental Music	The Piano Mill Project	Winner
2017	Art Music Awards: QLD Award for Excellence by an Individual	Conceiving and curating the 2016 Australian Percussion Gathering	Winner
2011	Art Music Award: National Award for Excellence by an Organisation	Clocked Out 2009-10 Season	Winner
2000	Green Room Awards: Commitment To Cabaret (Venue/producer) and Most Innovative Use Of Form	Cabaret Dada with Erik Griswold	Winner
