= Mike Cooper (musician) =

- Born: Michael Cooper; 24 August 1942 (age 84); Reading, Berkshire, England
- Genres: Country blues; jazz experimental; Hawaiian music
- Occupations: Musician; guitarist; songwriter
- Instruments: Guitar, vocals
- Years active: 1962–present
- Labels: Pye; Dawn; Hipshot; Room40
- Website: www.cooparia.com

Michael Cooper (born 24 August 1942) is an English guitarist and singer-songwriter. Initially coming to attention as a country blues performer, his later work also straddles jazz, Polynesian, ambient, and various experimental and improvisational styles.

== Biography ==
=== Early life ===
Mike Cooper was born in Reading, Berkshire. After spending several years as a child in Australia, he returned to England. He started playing guitar after leaving school aged 16, and became involved in local skiffle groups. Having spent time at local jazz clubs, in 1961 he saw Sonny Terry and Brownie McGhee play with Terry Lightfoot, and harmonica player James Cotton playing with Chris Barber's band at the Beaulieu Jazz Festival. Inspired by Alexis Korner, he formed an R&B band, the Blues Committee, in which he was the lead singer. The band supported visiting blues musicians including John Lee Hooker, Jimmy Reed, and Sonny Boy Williamson. With changes in line-up, from 1964 the Blues Committee diversified into modern jazz as well as R&B.

Cooper also played as a solo act in folk clubs around Reading, performing country blues and folk music, After meeting such musicians as Martin Carthy, Leon Rosselson and Don Partridge, he began playing in London clubs, and appeared briefly as a guitar player in the 1963 film That Kind of Girl. He bought a 1932 National resophonic guitar, and learned to play Blind Boy Fuller's repertoire of songs, gradually acquiring his own style and learning to play lap steel guitar with a miniature whiskey bottle.

=== Early career ===
In 1965 Cooper turned professional, and played regular gigs in and around Reading. He met virtuoso guitarist Derek Hall, and they established a shared residency at the Shades coffee house in Reading, hosting visiting artists such as John Renbourn, Bert Jansch, Davey Graham, Al Stewart and others. With Hall, Cooper recorded a limited edition EP, Out of the Shades, on the local Kennet record label, comprising a mixture of country blues and other tunes. After Hall moved away, Cooper teamed up with harmonica player Jerry Kingett and recorded an unreleased album in the Netherlands. Cooper continued to perform as a solo act, touring widely in the UK and Europe. In 1968, he recorded another EP, Up the Country Blues, for the Saydisc label in Bristol, with liner notes by his friend Ian A. Anderson. Cooper and Anderson appeared, with fellow acoustic blues musicians Jo Ann and Dave Kelly, on the album Blues Like Showers of Rain, and Cooper and Anderson also shared the LP The Inverted World, both albums released on the Matchbox label.

Cooper continued to develop his playing style, and performed around Britain in clubs and at festivals. In 1968 he signed a recording contract offered by record producer Peter Eden at Pye Records, and at the end of the year recorded the album Oh Really!?. Apart from one song each by Blind Boy Fuller and Son House, all the tracks were written by Cooper. The album was performed as acoustic blues, with Cooper heavily influenced by Mississippi Fred McDowell, with whom he performed.

Increasingly Cooper developed his own eclectic approach following his exposure to a wider range of music, especially jazz, at festivals where he performed. His second album, Do I Know You?, on Pye's subsidiary Dawn label, featured the bass playing of jazz musician Harry Miller, as well as field recordings, and was followed by his 1970 album Trout Steel, featuring a wider range of musicians including Mike Osborne, Alan Skidmore and John Taylor, as well as Harry Miller, Stefan Grossman, and the folk-rock band Heron. The album is considered "one of his most enduring and influential recordings."

His next album, Places I Know, was originally intended as a double album, with one LP of blues recordings and the other covering jazz and rock, but was released as a single album credited to Mike Cooper with the Machine Gun Co. and Michael Gibbs. In 1972, he released The Machine Gun Co. with Mike Cooper, a band album on which the other members were Geoff Hawkins (saxophone), Alan Cook (keyboards), Les Calvert (bass) and Tim Richardson (percussion). He was encouraged by music executive Tony Hall to make what became his final album of the decade, Life & Death in Paradise. It was released in 1974 and featured drummer Louis Moholo. In 1977, two of his tracks were included on Stefan Grossman's album Country Blues Guitar Festival which also featured Son House and Jo Ann Kelly.

=== Stylistic diversification and later career ===
Cooper continued to perform and tour in the UK and Europe, often collaborating with jazz musicians. He later said of the period, "I left behind the safe shores of melody and conventional harmony and headed out into the sea of timbre." The album 'Ave They Started Yet? recorded a collaboration with dancer Joanna Pyne on a tour in Europe in early 1980. The same year, he recorded a live album in Berlin with free jazz musicians Dave Holland and Lol Coxhill (credited as "The Johnny Rondo Duo"). He also played in G.T. Moore's reggae band the Outsiders; experimental band The Mayhem Quartet; the "no wave" jazz group Beating Time; the band Avant Roots, playing a mixture of Greek rembetika and improvised music; acoustic country blues band National Gallery; and electric blues band Continental Drift.

In 1985, he recorded The Continuous Preaching Blues with Ian A. Anderson. He also recorded with Lol Coxhill and percussionist Roger Turner as The Recedents. Cooper became increasingly influenced by Polynesian slack key guitar styles, and in 1987 recorded an album, Aveklei Uptowns Hawaiians, with French slide guitarist Cyrille Lefebvre and other musicians including Lol Coxhill. He has continued to record in a unique style that he has called "ambient electronic exotica". From 1986 to 1996, he performed around Europe (Italy/Germany/Switzerland) with a four piece country blues band called "National Gallery - featuring Mark Makin, Michael Messer and Ed Genis. They performed around various festivals and appeared on Paul Jones Blues show on BBC Radio 2. They also appeared on Rai Uno TV in Italy. A CD featuring half of the band (Cooper/Makin) was issued on Rhiannon records called "National Gallery - Keep It Clean". Living in Rome, in 1999 he set up his own Hipshot label to release his recordings, and his subsequent releases have been prolific. Some of his albums include looped samples of music recorded in the Pacific, New Guinea, Australia, and elsewhere, often treated electronically. His later releases have included Rayon Hula (2004), which incorporates samples of exotica musician Arthur Lyman, White Shadows in the South Seas (2013), and New Globe Notes (2014). He also released Fratello Mare (2015) and Raft (2017).

Cooper has also written and performed scores for silent films played at festivals around the world. He has also written extensively on Hawaiian slack key guitar styles and performers.

=== Reissues ===
His early 1970s albums Trout Steel, Places I Know, and The Machine Gun Co. with Mike Cooper have been reissued on CD.

== Discography ==
=== Solo albums ===
Source: Mike Cooper Discography, Cooparia.com

- Oh Really?! (Pye, 1969)
- Do I Know You? (Dawn, 1970)
- Trout Steel (Dawn, 1971)
- Places I Know (Dawn, 1972)
- Life & Death in Paradise (Fresh Air, 1975)
- Mississippi Delta Blues – Live from Papa Madeo (LTR, 1982)
- Island Songs (Nato, 1996)
- Kiribati (Hipshot, 1999)
- Zanzibar (Hipshot, 1999)
- Finding Other Worlds – 21st Century Guitars (Hipshot, 2000)
- Marconi (Hipshot, 2001)
- Globe Notes (Hipshot, 2001)
- Attenti Al Fuso (Hipshot, 2002)
- Radio Daze (Hipshot, 2003)
- Cruising Paradise (Hipshot, 2003)
- Rayon Hula (Hipshot, 2004)
- Metalbox (Hipshot, 2005)
- Reluctant Swimmer / Virtual Surfer (Hipshot, 2005)
- Spirit Songs (Hipshot, 2006)
- Giacinto (Hipshot, 2006)
- Borders (Hipshot, 2006)
- Send of the Sea (Hipshot, 2007)
- Beach Crossings – Pacific Footprints (Rai Trade, 2007)
- Future Folk (Hipshot, 2008)
- Aelita, Queen of Mars (Hipshot, 2008)
- Tabu (Hipshot, 2008)
- Onibaba (Hipshot, 2008)
- Pacific Voyager (Hipshot, 2008)
- Chao Phraya (Hipshot, 2008)
- Live at the Hint House, New York City (Qbico, 2009)
- Live in Sardinia (Hipshot, 2010)
- Live in Athens (Hipshot, 2010)
- Blue Guitar (Hipshot, 2010)
- Radio Paradise – Mike Cooper in Beirut (Johnny Kafka, 2011)
- White Shadows in the South Seas (Room40, 2013)
- Forbidden Delta Planet Blues (Linear Obsessional, 2015)
- Light on a Wall (Backwards, 2015)
- Fratello Mare (Room40, 2015)
- Guitar Solos – Free at Last (Hipshot, 2016)
- Sky Songs (Hipshot, 2016)
- New Guitar, Old Hat, Knew Blues (Room40, 2016)
- Raft (Room40, 2017)
- The Five Rings (Hipshot, 2018)
- Tropical Gothic (Discrepant, 2018)
- Playing With Water (Room40, 2020)

=== Collaborations and shared albums ===
Source: Mike Cooper Discography, Cooparia.com

- Blues Like Showers of Rain (various artists, Saydisc, 1968)
- Inverted World (with Ian A. Anderson, Saydisc, 1968)
- Mike Cooper with the Machine Gun Co. and Michael Gibbs (Dawn, 1971)
- The Machine Gun Co. with Mike Cooper (Dawn, 1973)
- How To Play Blues Guitar Vol. 2 (with Stefan Grossman, Kicking Mule, 1977)
- Country Blues Guitar Festival (with Stefan Grossman, Kicking Mule, 1978)
- 'Ave They Started Yet? (with Joanna Pyne, Matchless, 1981)
- Johnny Rondo Duo Plus Mike Cooper (with Lol Coxhill and Dave Holland, FMP, 1982)
- The Continuous Preaching Blues (with Ian A. Anderson, Appaloosa, 1985)
- Barbecue Strut (as The Recedents, with Lol Coxhill and Roger Turner, Nato, 1986)
- Aveklei Uptown Hawaiians (with Cyril Lefebvre, Chabada, 1987)
- Zombie Bloodbath on the Isle of Dogs (as The Recedents, with Lol Coxhill and Roger Turner, Nato, 1991)
- Avant Roots (with Viv Dogan Corringham, Mash, 1994)
- Improvvisazioni Quartetto (with Jean-Marc Montera, Mauro Orselli, Eugenio Sanna, Ada, 1998)
- Hulabaluh (with The Uptown Hawaiians, Hipshot, 2001)
- Live @ Cineclub Detour (with Richard Nunns and Elio Martusciello, Hipshot, 2003)
- Guardia Avanti (with Viv Corringham, Lol Coxhill, Steve Beresford, Max Eastley, Hipshot, 2003)
- Tu Fuego (with Jeff Henderson, Anthony Donaldson, Tom Callwood, Qbico, 2006)
- Oceanic Feeling-Like (with Chris Abrahams, Room40, 2008)
- Right Hear Side By Side (with Yan Chiu Leung, Linear Obsessional, 2013)
- Trace (with Chris Abrahams, Al Maslakh, 2014)
- Truth in the Abstract Blues (with Fabrizio Spera, Roberto Bellatalla, Ethbo, 2014)
- Cantos de Lisboa (with Steve Gunn, Rvng, 2014)
- Stochastic Parrot (with Pierre Bastien, Mark Cunningham, 2026)
