= Black Angel Exit =

EP by The Black Angels
- Released: May 13, 2008
- Genre: Psychedelic rock
- Label: Light in the Attic Records

Black Angel Exit is a limited edition bonus EP given away to those who pre-ordered the Black Angels release Directions to See a Ghost. It was also sold at live shows on the Black Angel's 2008 North American Summer Tour.

"Surf City Revisited" and "Paladin's Last Stand" are otherwise available as bonus tracks on the Directions to See a Ghost 3-LP set, and "Black Angel Exit/Shine" is available as a bonus track via iTunes.

== Track listing ==
1. "Surf City Revisited" - 5:14
2. "Paladin's Last Stand" - 3:44
3. "No Satisfaction"(Black Mountain cover)- 4:56
4. "Black Angel Exit/Shine" - 9:28
