= Piano Mill =

General information
- Location: Harrigans Lane, Willsons Downfall, NSW, Australia

Website
- Piano Mill

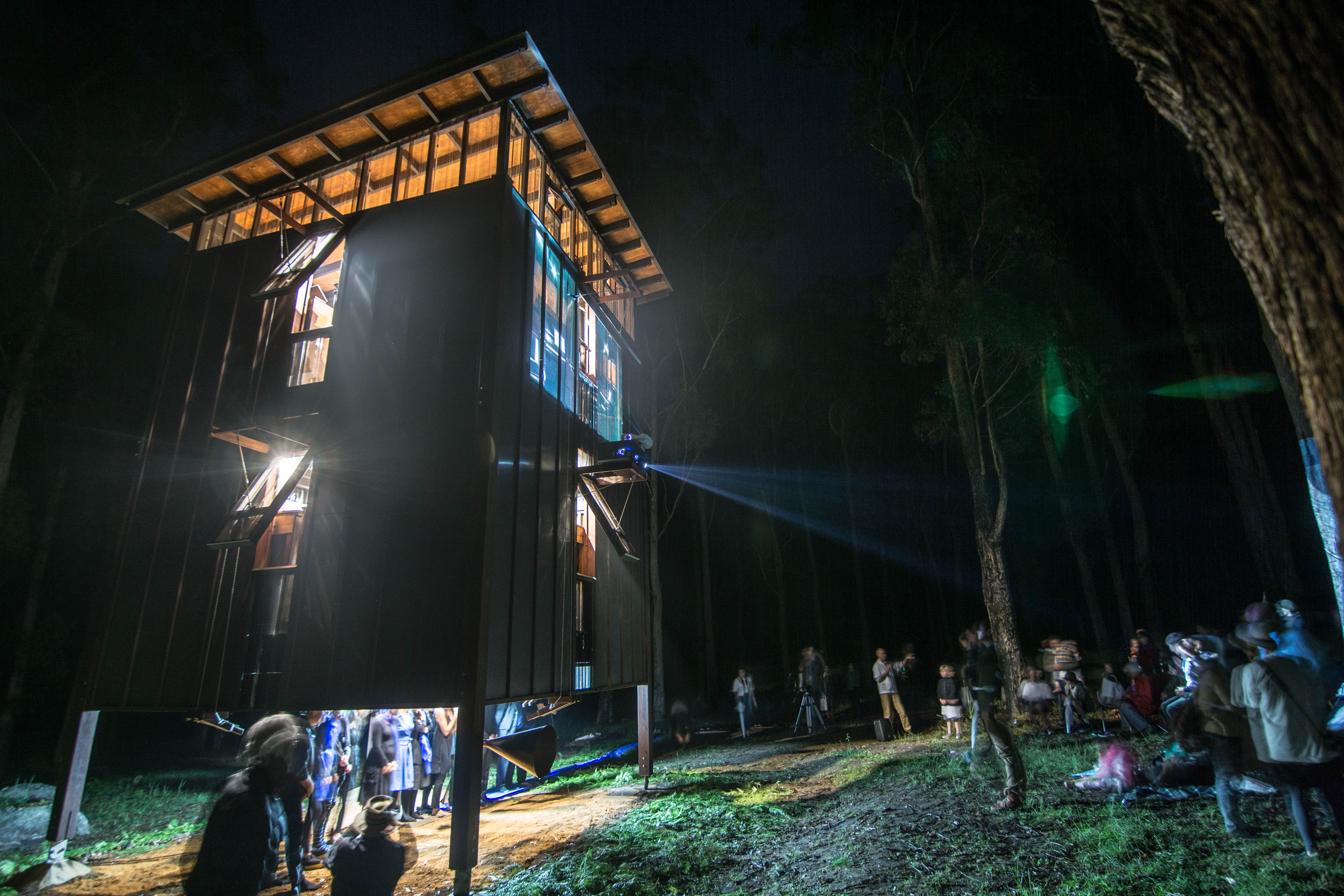
External view of the Piano Mill

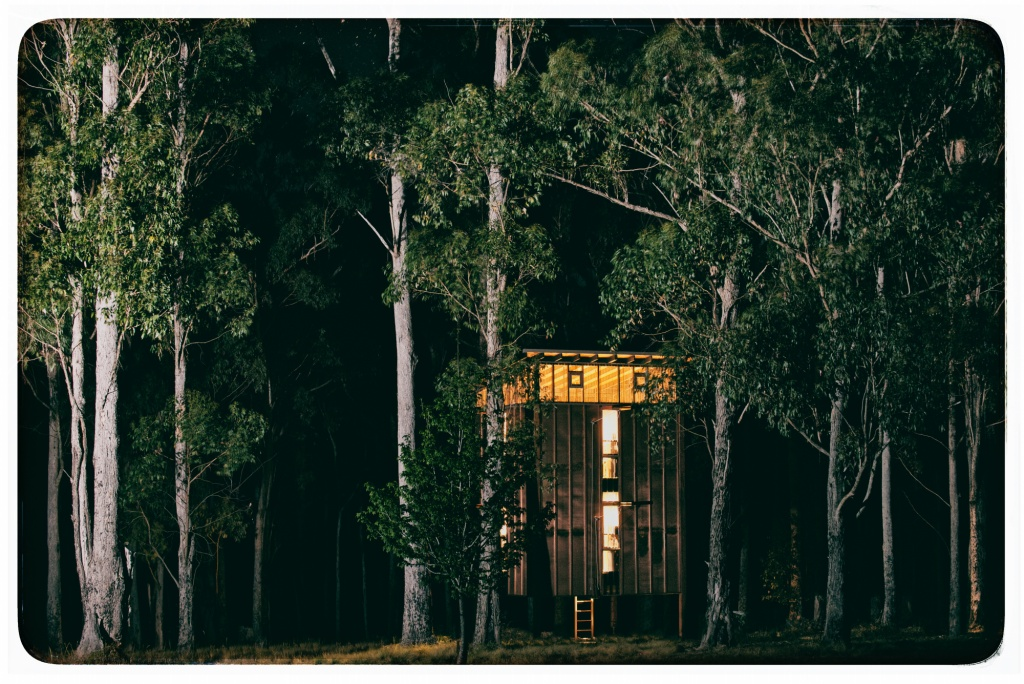
View of the Piano Mill in context at night, illuminated from within.

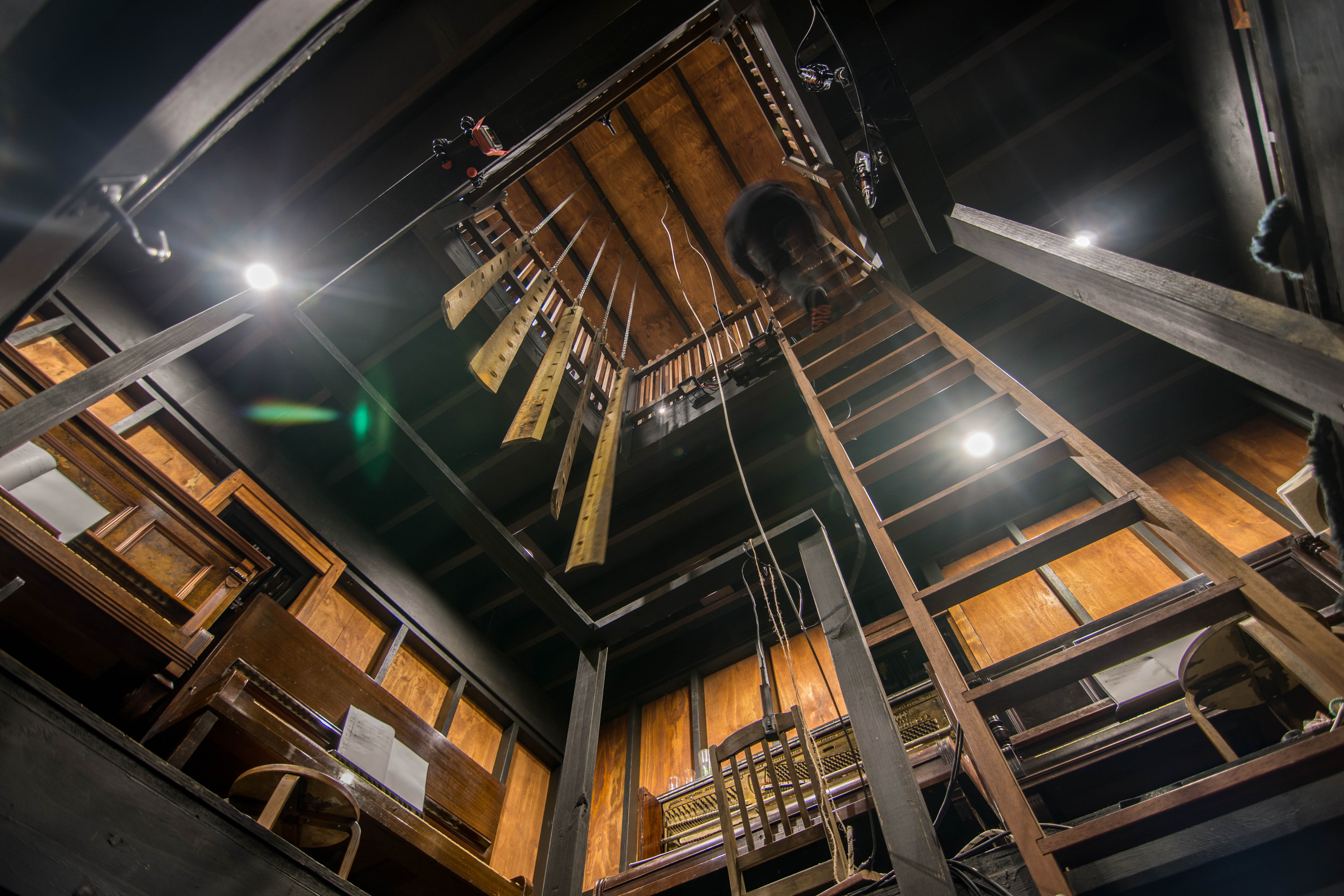
Internal view of the Piano Mill

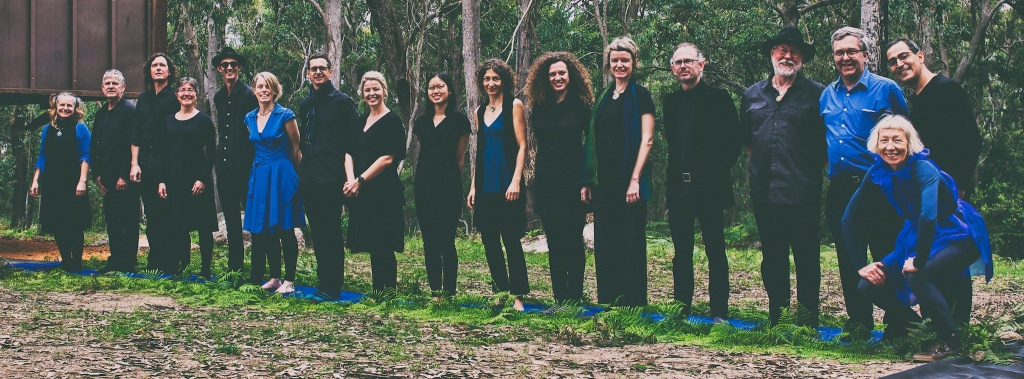
The Pianists

A Piano Mill is a hybrid building and musical instrument located at Willsons Downfall in Northern New South Wales, Australia. It was designed and purpose-built to house sixteen reclaimed pianos in a tower structure. The instrument is designed to have the sixteen pianos played simultaneously.

== History ==
The first Piano Mill, constructed in Willsons Downfall, Northern New South Wales, Australia, was designed by architect Bruce Wolfe specifically for composer Erik Griswold. This structure is a copper clad tower approximately 9m tall with a footprint of 4.5m X 4.5m and its lowest floor is 1.6m above the ground allowing the pianos to be installed post-construction. The mill is equipped with tuned grader blades as chimes and two sonic periscopes. To launch The Piano Mill, Griswold composed a new work, All’s grist that comes to the mill, that responds to various influences such as architecture, the natural environment and Australia's colonial history. It was performed in the Piano Mill on Sunday March 27, 2016, and since that time there have been two subsequent pieces written for the instrument.

The first Piano Mill has won awards including a World Architecture Festival 2018 Award for the Culture category, a National Commendation at the Australian Institute of Architects 2017 Awards, and a National Award for Experimental Music at the 2017 APRA AMCOS Art Music Awards.
