= Phosphene Dream =

Studio album by the Black Angels
- Released: September 14, 2010
- Genre: Psychedelic rock
- Length: 36:11
- Label: Blue Horizon
- Producer: Dave Sardy

The Black Angels chronology
Directions to See a Ghost (2008)	Phosphene Dream (2010)	Indigo Meadow (2013)

Professional ratings
Aggregate scores
Source	Rating
Metacritic	70/100
Review scores
Source	Rating
AllMusic	3.5/5 stars
NME	4/10 stars
Pitchfork	7.2/10

Phosphene Dream is the third album from rock band the Black Angels. It was released on September 13, 2010, in the UK and September 14, 2010, in the United States by Blue Horizon. This is the first album the Black Angels released with Blue Horizon, having previously worked with Light in the Attic Records. The album debuted in the US at number 52 on the Billboard 200.

== Track listing ==
Phosphene Dream track listing
No.	Title	Length
1.	"Bad Vibrations"	4:27
2.	"Haunting at 1300 McKinley"	2:23
3.	"Yellow Elevator #2"	4:56
4.	"Sunday Afternoon"	2:43
5.	"River of Blood"	3:58
6.	"Entrance Song"	3:38
7.	"Phosphene Dream"	3:41
8.	"True Believers"	4:33
9.	"Telephone"	1:59
10.	"The Sniper"	3:53

Bonus tracks

1. "Melanie's Melody" (iTunes)
2. "Ronettes" (iTunes)
3. "My Boat Is Sinking" (Amazon)
4. "Choose to Choose" (Napster)
5. "Entrance Song (Raindance Version)" (Napster)
6. "At Night" (Shockhound)

== Charts ==
Chart performance for Phosphene Dream
Chart (2010)	Peak position
French Albums (SNEP)	52
US Billboard 200	52
