= Clear Lake Forest =

EP by The Black Angels
- Released: July 22, 2014
- Genre: Rock
- Length: 27:29
- Label: Blue Horizon

The Black Angels chronology
Indigo Meadow (2013)	Clear Lake Forest (2014)	Death Song (2017)

Professional ratings
Aggregate scores
Source	Rating
Metacritic	74/100
Review scores
Source	Rating
NME	4/5 stars

Clear Lake Forest is an EP by American band the Black Angels. It was released in July 2014 under Blue Horizon Records.

== Track listing ==
Clear Lake Forest track listing
No.	Title	Length
1.	"Sunday Evening"	3:40
2.	"Tired Eyes"	3:30
3.	"Diamond Eyes"	3:50
4.	"The Flop"	2:59
5.	"An Occurrence at 4507 South Third Street"	3:20
6.	"The Executioner"	3:35
7.	"Linda's Gone"	6:35
Total length:		27:29

== Charts ==
Chart performance for Clear Lake Forest
Chart (2010)	Peak position
Belgian Albums (Ultratop Wallonia)	132
US Billboard 200	136
