= Pamela J. Marshall =

American horn player and composer (born 1954)

Pamela J. Marshall (born 31 May 1954) is an American horn player and composer. She was born in Beverly, Massachusetts, and studied horn, electronic music and conducting at the Eastman and Yale Schools of Music. After completing her education, she settled in Lexington, Massachusetts. She plays French horn in orchestra and composes for synthesizer, brass, mandolin and orchestra. Since 2015, she has been a key participant in The k a rl h e nn i ng Ensemble (Boston), both as hornist and composer.

Marshall has written software and developed sounds for Kurzweil Music Systems and worked at Powersoft Corporation as a technical writer. She established her own music publishing company, Spindrift Music.

== Selected works ==
Marshall composes chamber, vocal and orchestral music.

- Colored Leaves for solo horn (1964)
- Hillslide for brass quintet and alphorn solo (1992)
- Spindrift (1974)
- Nautilus (1975)
- Meditations for organ (2005)
- Summer into Winter for clarinet (2007)
- Rising for viola solo (2009)
- Shepherds and Angels for mixed choir SATB, violin & harp (2010)
- Samurai Song on a text by Robert Pinsky for soprano, flute & piano (2018)
- Birds on the Harmonic Plain for 2 fl (fl 1 doubling on picc), cl, hn & fixed media (2018)

Discography

Her music has been recorded and issued on CD, including:

- Ghosts: Solos and Duets (2009) Beauport Classics, ASIN: B0049YJSBU
- Through the Mist (2015) Ravello Records RR7901, ASIN: B00RLXVX9G
