= Franz Streitwieser =

German American trumpeter (1939–2021)

Franz Xaver Streitwieser (pronounced Strite-vee-zer) (16 September 1939 - 8 November 2021) was a German American trumpet player. He owned and operated The Streitwieser Foundation Trumpet Museum, a museum of antique and vintage brass instruments. The museum of over 1,000 items operated from 1980 to 1995.

== Education and music career ==
Streitwieser was born in Bavaria in 1939. In 1961, he graduated from the Mozarteum University Salzburg in Austria. In 1963, he went to study in the United States and spent a year studying at the Juilliard School in New York.

Meanwhile, in 1957, he joined the Camerata Academica Orchestra in Salzburg as second trumpeter. Subsequently, he was from 1963 to 1972 in the Philharmonic Orchestra of Trier, he was the first trumpet player from 1965 to 1972 in the Philharmonic Orchestra of Freiburg.

In 1973 he founded the Delaware Trumpet Ensemble in West Chester, Pennsylvania. In addition, he was principal trumpeter for the Delaware Symphony in Wilmington, Delaware, from 1973 to 1975. From 1982 he was second trumpeter for the Symphony and Chamber Orchestra in Pottstown and from 1983 first trumpeter for the All-American Cornet Band in West Chester.

== Teacher and collector ==
In addition, Streitwieser taught at the University of Freiburg, from 1972 to 1975 as a W2-Professur (associate professor) and then until 1978 as an assistant professor of music at the Pädagogische Hochschule of the same university. In 1980 he was co-founder and conductor of the Sudelendeubohe Ostermusik-Tage in Regensburg.

In 1981 he was awarded the Adalbert-Stifter-Preis for his music research. He received his master's degree from the University of South Dakota in 1980.

He built up an extensive music collection of more than a thousand pieces. With this he set up a small private museum in Pennsylvania that gained a name among connoisseurs. His collection was transferred to Europe in the 1990s. Here it has been on display since circa 1996 in the Musikinstrumentsmuseum in the 13th-century Schloss Kremsegg in Kremsmünster in Austria. On the closure of the museum at Schloss Kremsegg in 2018, the collection was transferred to the Landesmuseum in Linz.

Streitwieser died in his sleep on 8 November 2021. About ten years before that, he had been diagnosed with Alzheimer's.
