= Primephonic =

Defunct classical music streaming service

- Industry: Classical music streaming service
- Defunct: 2021
- Successor: Apple Music Classical

Primephonic was an Amsterdam-based classical music streaming service that was acquired by Apple in 2021. Primephonic aimed to address the classical music niche with search features customized for the genre, hand-coded metadata, and compensation for artists based on time streamed, not tracks played. Access to the service ceased in September 2021.

== History ==
Primephonic was co-founded by CEO Thomas Steffens, Simon Eder, and Veronica Neo in 2014. The company launched as a download service before adding streaming services in 2017.

Primephonic launched in the United States in 2017.

On August 30, 2021, Apple Inc. announced it had acquired Primephonic. Access to the service ended on September 7, 2021. Apple Music planned to integrate Primephonic's assets into a similar classical music streaming service, Apple Music Classical, in 2022, but the service's release date was not announced until 2023 and was released on March 28, 2023.
