= Indigo Meadow =

Studio album by the Black Angels
- Released: April 2, 2013
- Genre: Psychedelic rock
- Length: 45:44
- Label: Blue Horizon
- Producer: John Congleton

The Black Angels chronology
Phosphene Dream (2010)	Indigo Meadow (2013)	Clear Lake Forest (2014)

Professional ratings
Aggregate scores
Source	Rating
Metacritic	66/100
Review scores
Source	Rating
AllMusic	3.5/5 stars
Paste	7.7/10
Pitchfork	4.9/10
PopMatters	6/10 stars

Indigo Meadow is the fourth studio album by American rock band the Black Angels. It was released on April 2, 2013, by Blue Horizon. "Indigo Meadow" debuted at No. 15 on the Alternative Albums chart.

== Track listing ==
Indigo Meadow track listing
No.	Title	Length
1.	"Indigo Meadow"	2:49
2.	"Evil Things"	3:44
3.	"Don't Play with Guns"	3:43
4.	"Holland"	4:03
5.	"The Day"	2:37
6.	"Love Me Forever"	3:10
7.	"Always Maybe"	4:09
8.	"War on Holiday"	2:35
9.	"Broken Soldier"	3:36
10.	"I Hear Colors (Chromaesthesia)"	4:04
11.	"Twisted Light"	3:21
12.	"You're Mine"	3:40
13.	"Black Isn't Black"	4:21

== Charts ==
Chart performance for Indigo Meadow
Chart (2013)	Peak position
Belgian Albums (Ultratop Flanders)	146
Belgian Albums (Ultratop Wallonia)	172
French Albums (SNEP)	108
US Billboard 200	64
