= Wilderness of Mirrors (The Black Angels album) =

Studio album by the Black Angels
- Released: September 16, 2022
- Length: 57:56
- Label: Partisan
- Producer: Phil Ek

The Black Angels chronology
Death Song (2017)	Wilderness of Mirrors (2022)

Wilderness of Mirrors is the sixth studio album by American psychedelic rock band the Black Angels released on September 16, 2022, through Partisan Records.

Four singles were released ahead of the album: "El Jardín", "Firefly", "Without a Trace", and "Empires Falling".

== Critical reception ==
Professional ratings
Aggregate scores
Source	Rating
Metacritic	74/100
Review scores
Source	Rating
American Songwriter	3.5/5 stars
Classic Rock	4/5 stars
Gigwise	7/10 stars
God Is in the TV	4/5 stars
Loud and Quiet	8/10
Louder Than War	4.5/5 stars
Record Collector	3/5 stars
Uncut	7/10
Under the Radar	7/10 stars

Wilderness of Mirrors was well received by contemporary music critics. On review aggregator website, Metacritic, Wilderness of Mirrors has an average rating of 74 out of 100, based on four critic reviews.

== Track listing ==
1. "Without a Trace" – 4:07
2. "History of the Future" – 3:45
3. "Empires Falling" – 3:30
4. "El Jardín" – 3:45
5. "La Pared (Govt. Wall Blues)" – 4:11
6. "Firefly" – 3:01
7. "Make It Known" – 3:17
8. "The River" – 4:56
9. "Wilderness of Mirrors" – 4:15
10. "Here & Now" – 2:37
11. "100 Flowers of Paracusia" – 3:47
12. "A Walk on the Outside" – 3:05
13. "Vermillion Eyes" – 4:09
14. "Icon" – 3:43
15. "Suffocation" – 5:41

== Charts ==
Chart performance for Wilderness of Mirrors
Chart (2022)	Peak position
Belgian Albums (Ultratop Wallonia)	65
French Albums (SNEP)	122
German Albums (Offizielle Top 100)	61
Swiss Albums (Schweizer Hitparade)	80
US Top Album Sales (Billboard)	34
US Top Current Album Sales (Billboard)	30
US Indie Store Album Sales (Billboard)	13
