= Ileana Perez Velazquez =

Composer

Ileana Perez Velazquez is a Cuban-American composer who has been professor of composition at Williams College since 2000. She was born in Cienfuegos, Cuba, and studied undergraduate piano and composition at the Higher Institute of Arts (ISA), Havana, Cuba before moving to the United States for graduate work in composition at Dartmouth College and Indiana University School of Music in Bloomington, where she earned her Doctor of Musical Arts degree.

Her work draws from a range of influences, which a New York Times review described as an "otherworldly quality mirrored in the accompaniment and sounding like a musical expression of the Latin American literary form magical realism." She has been commissioned to compose works, including the 2015 Commission from the Fromm Music Foundation at Harvard University and by performers and ensembles, including Continuum (New York City), Momenta String quartet (New York City), Miranda Cuckson and Nunc, Cassatt Quartet (New York City), Ensemble Dal Niente from Chicago, Talujon Percussion Ensemble, by the Berkshire Symphony Orchestra, and by Mari Kimura, among others.

Festival performances of her work includes venues such as the Sonidos de las Americas Cuba Festival at Carnegie Hall, by the American Composers Orchestra Chamber Players, at the Composers Now Festival in New York City National Sawdust kick off concert, The LA Philharmonic included one of her composition as part of their Panamerican concert series at Walt Disney Hall, her composition “Vuelo” was performed at the Tanglewood Contemporary Music Festival, Ozawa Hall in 2024, Ensemble Connect from Carnegie Hall performed her “Light Echoes” in 2025. Her music has been performed in Cuba, the United States, throughout South and Central America, Europe, Asia, and the Middle East.

== Recordings ==
- 2017 - A Cascade of Light in a Resonance Universe: Music of Ileana Perez Velazquez, Albany Records
- 2008 - An Enchanted Being: Music of Ileana Perez Velazquez, Albany Records
- 2025 - Memories and Roots, Albany Records
