= Erik Griswold =

- Born: 1969 (age 56–57); Los Angeles, California, United States
- Occupation: Composer
- Instrument: Piano
- Label: Room40, Neuma
- Website: erikgriswold.org

Erik Griswold (born 1969) is an American-born, Australian-based composer and pianist from Brisbane.

== Career ==
Griswold began playing piano at the age of five, and has cited his early influences as Igor Stravinsky, Béla Bartok, and Miles Davis, and later Charles Mingus and Duke Ellington as he became more interested in improvisation.

He studied his undergraduate at University of Southern California, Los Angeles, and University of California, San Diego, before moving to Australia in 1999. Initially he moved to Melbourne, before settling in Brisbane, and it was after his move to Australia that Griswold began to seriously explore prepared piano and focus more on his work as a performer.

He has released several albums on Australian record label Room40, beginning with 2004's Altona Sketches, and album of prepared piano pieces.

In 2020 ABC Classics commissioned a new 15-minute work from Griswold to have its premier at the 2021 Brisbane Music Festival. The work How Strange the Change was inspired by the COVID-19 pandemic, while the title was in homage to Cole Porter’s Ev’ry Time We Say Goodbye.

== Work with Vanessa Tomlinson ==
Erik Griswold has released music with his partner percussionist Vanessa Tomlinson as Clocked Out Duo. In 2000 they won two Green Room Awards for their collaboration Dada Cabare, and as Clocked Out won the Award for Excellence by an Organisation or Individual and Queensland State Award at 2011's APRA and AMC Art Music Awards.

In 2015 they celebrated 15 years of making music together, having toured internationally and already released eight albums together at the time.

In 2016 they collaborated on music for architect Bruce Wolfe's project Piano Mill, a tower located in Queensland bushland housing 16 pianos.

For 2017's World Science Festival in Brisbane, they performed Time Crystals, a musical piece inspired by physicist Frank Wilczek's theories on time. The song previously appeared on their eighth album of the same name, released in 2014.

== Awards ==
Year	Award	Work	Status
2021	Art Music Awards: Work of the Year: Dramatic	Dragon Ladies Don't Weep	Winner
2017	ARIA Award for Best Jazz Album	Water Pushes Sand	Nominated
2016	Art Music Awards: Work of the Year: Jazz	Water Pushes Sand	Nominated
2000	Green Room Awards: Commitment To Cabaret (Venue/producer) and Most Innovative Use Of Form	Cabaret Dada with Vanessa Tomlinson	Winner
