= Room40 =

Australian record label

- Founded: 2000
- Founder: Lawrence English
- Genre: Experimental music
- Country of origin: Australia
- Location: Brisbane
- Official website: room40.org

Room40 is an Australian independent record label founded by Lawrence English.

The label has released work by Australian and international musicians such as Erik Griswold, Chihei Hatakeyama, Mike Cooper, Ben Frost, and Beatriz Ferreyra. It has released over 300 titles since 2000.

Room40's first releases didn't arrive until 2002, with the albums Powerhouse Sessions and A Picturesque View, Ignored. Both were recorded live at Brisbane Powerhouse in 2002 and released December of that year.

Initially releasing music on CD, Room40 also issued music on vinyl, lathe records, digital audio files, DVD, and cassette tapes. In 2016, the label released a sound box with an album of generative music by Spyros Polychronopoulos, meaning each time the listener presses play, something new will be heard. The sound box sold out within four hours of being announced.

The label released its first book in 2010, Lawrence English's Site-Listening: Brisbane. The book featured maps to 17 locations around Brisbane, with essays by David Toop, Nick Earls and English, and recordings from the locations on a 3-inch CD.

In 2005 Room40 started Open Frame, an annual music festival held in Brisbane, with later events held in Sydney and London. The most recent festival was held in 2019, with the 2020 festival cancelled because of the COVID-19 pandemic.
