= Passover (album) =

Studio album by The Black Angels
- Released: April 11, 2006
- Recorded: Cacophony Recorders, Wire Recording, and Shh! Recording Studios, Austin, Texas
- Genre: Psychedelic rock
- Length: 58:48
- Label: Light in the Attic Records
- Producer: The Black Angels, Erik Wofford, Ross Ingram

The Black Angels chronology
The Black Angels (2005)	Passover (2006)	Directions to See a Ghost (2008)

Professional ratings
Review scores
Source	Rating
AllMusic	link
Pitchfork	7.2/10 link

Passover is the debut album from psychedelic rock band The Black Angels, released in 2006.

== Track listing ==
1. "Young Men Dead" – 5:32
2. "The First Vietnamese War" – 3:30
3. "The Sniper at the Gates of Heaven" – 4:16
4. "The Prodigal Sun" – 4:23
5. "Black Grease" – 4:37
6. "Manipulation" – 5:49
7. "Empire" – 5:35
8. "Better Off Alone" – 3:03
9. "Bloodhounds on My Trail" – 3:58
10. "Call to Arms" – 18:06
- In the CD version, the song "Call to Arms" ends at minute 10:42. After 3 minutes and 30 seconds of silence (10:42 - 14:12), begins a hidden song: it's a cover of Jimmy Cliff's "Vietnam" with modernized lyrics referring to the Iraq War.

== Personnel ==
The Black Angels

- Alex Maas – vocals, bass
- Christian Bland – guitar, bass, vocals
- Jennifer Raines – drone machine
- Nate Ryan – bass, guitar
- Stephanie Bailey – drums, percussion

Production

- Erik Wofford – recording and mixing at Cacophony Recording Studio (1–4, 7–10)
- Ross Ingram – recording at Wire Recording & Shh! Recording (tracks 5, 6)
- Dave Cooley – mastering at Bionic
- Christian Bland, Brian Jones – graphic design
- Thingmakers – printing

== In popular culture ==
- "Black Grease" was featured in the video game Grand Theft Auto V, and in episode "Church in Ruins" from the second season of True Detective (2015).
- "Young Men Dead" was used in the series premiere of True Detective.
- "Young Men Dead" and "The Prodigal Sun" were featured in the 2007 film Death Sentence (2007 film)
- "The Prodigal Sun" was featured in the Spanish film Perdedores Natos, directed by Chris Jiménez in 2013.
- "Young Men Dead" was also featured in the second episode of the first season of Fringe 2008, the episode "Prophets" of the fourth season of the TV series Person of Interest, the Season 5 episode "Frontforwards" of the United States series Covert Affairs., the episode "The Long Bright Dark" of True Detective (2014), the Comic Con 2014 highlight reel for Person of Interest, the 2010 video game Alan Wake and the 2011 Snowboarding Documentary The Art of Flight
- A remixed version of "Young Men Dead" plays in the teaser trailer for Jack Reacher.
- "The First Vietnamese War" was featured in the 2012 video game Spec Ops: The Line.
- "Young Men Dead" was featured in the Fable III launch trailer.
- "Young Men Dead" was featured in the 2020 video game The Last of Us Part II.
- "Manipulation" was featured in the episode "Mistrut Blossons" of the 2018 TV series Condor.
- "Better Off Alone" was featured in the video game Need for Speed The Run.
