= 2022 in classical music =

This article is for major events and other topics related to classical music in 2022.

== Events ==
- 1 January – The Vienna Philharmonic performs its annual Neujahrskonzert, conducted by Daniel Barenboim, with a live audience for the first time since the advent of the COVID-19 pandemic, and with Eva Teimel as the presenter for the ORF radio transmission of the concert, the first female radio presenter for ORF in the history of the concert.
- 4 January – The Komische Oper Berlin announces the appointment of James Gaffigan as its next music director, effective with the 2023–2024 season, with an initial contract of 4 years.
- 7 January
  - Thomas Dausgaard resigns as music director of the Seattle Symphony, via e-mail, with immediate effect.
  - Elina Vähälä, the Minnesota Orchestra and Osmo Vänskä give the first-ever live performance in North America of the original 1904 version of the Violin Concerto of Jean Sibelius. The same artists reprised the work the next evening, 8 January 2022.
- 12 January – The Toronto Symphony Orchestra announces the appointment of Mark Williams as its next chief executive officer, effective April 2022.
- 18 January – In Milan, the first night of the new La Scala production of Bellini's I Capuleti e i Montecchi takes place, conducted by Speranza Scappucci, the first female Italian conductor ever to conduct a production at La Scala.
- 19 January
  - At the Concertgebouw, Amsterdam, 'Kapsalon Theater' ('Hair Salon Theatre'), a piece of performance art, takes place with hairdressers serving patrons in the presence of performing musicians from the Royal Concertgebouw Orchestra, in protest at the Dutch government's then-most recent restrictions on concerts with live audiences in the wake of the COVID-19 pandemic.
  - English Touring Opera announces that James Conway is to stand down as its artistic director at the close of 2022, and to serve in a part-time capacity in the post for the remainder of the calendar year.
  - The Colorado Springs Philharmonic announces that Josep Caballé Domenech is to conclude his tenure as its music director at the close of the 2022–2023 season.
- 24 January – The Opéra Royal de Wallonie announces the appointment of Giampaolo Bisanti as its next music director, effective with the 2022–2023 season.
- 25 January – The Landestheater Detmold announces the appointment of Per-Otto Johansson as its next Generalmusikdirektor, effective with the 2022–2023 season, with an initial contract of 4 years.
- 1 February
  - The Royal Danish Orchestra announces the appointment of Marie Jacquot as its next music director, the first female conductor ever named to the post, effective with the 2024–2025 season, with an initial contract of 5 years.
  - Norwegian National Opera and Ballet announces the appointment of Edward Gardner as its artistic advisor, with immediate effect, and as its next music director, effective 1 August 2024.
  - Opera Theatre of Saint Louis announces the appointment of Daniela Candillari as its principal conductor, the first female conductor ever named to the post, with an initial contract of 3 years.
  - The Royal Philharmonic Society (RPS) awards Jordi Savall honorary membership in the RPS, at his concert appearance at Wigmore Hall.
- 8 February – The BBC Scottish Symphony Orchestra announces the appointment of Ryan Wigglesworth as its next chief conductor, effective September 2022.
- 9 February – The Barbican Centre announces the appointment of Claire Spencer as its first-ever chief executive officer, effective May 2022.
- 12 February – The Orchestra of the Eighteenth Century announces the appointment of Kate Rockett as its next general director, effective 1 September 2022. In parallel, Sieuwert Verster is to stand down as the orchestra's general director.
- 13 February – Never produced during the creators' lifetimes, the first performance of the opera Grete Minde, with music by Eugen Engel and libretto by Hans Bodenstedt, takes place at the Theater Magdeburg, 79 years after the March 1943 death of the composer in the Sobibor extermination camp, following preparation of a complete performing score from the surviving papers.
- 15 February
  - Central City Opera announces the appointment of Pamela A. Pantos as its new president and chief executive officer, effective 28 February 2022.
  - The Colorado Symphony announces the appointment of Peter Oundjian as its principal conductor.
- 23 February – The North Carolina Symphony announces the appointment of Carlos Miguel Prieto as its next music director, effective with the 2023–2024 season, with an initial contract of 4 years.
- 24 February – The Nuremberg Symphony Orchestra announces the appointment of Jonathan Darlington as its next chief conductor, effective with the 2022–2023 season, with an initial contract of 5 years.
- 28 February – The Edinburgh International Festival announces the resignation of Valery Gergiev as its honorary president, in the wake of the 2022 Russian invasion of Ukraine.
- 1 March
  - The Edinburgh International Festival announces the appointment of Nicola Benedetti as its next festival director, the first woman and the first Scot to hold the post, effective 1 October 2022.
  - Munich mayor Dieter Reiter announces the dismissal of Valery Gergiev as principal conductor of the Munich Philharmonic, with immediate effect, after his request to Gergiev to denounce the 2022 Russian invasion of Ukraine received no response.
  - The Rotterdam Philharmonic Orchestra announces the termination of its artistic relationship with Valery Gergiev, rescinding his title of eredirigent (honorary conductor) and discontinuing its Gergiev Festival.
- 2 March
  - Vasily Petrenko announces a suspension of his conducting work in Russia, including his duties with the State Academic Symphony Orchestra of the Russian Federation, in the wake of the 2022 Russian invasion of Ukraine.
  - The New World Symphony and Michael Tilson Thomas jointly announce that Thomas is to stand down as the organisation's artistic director, effective 1 June 2022, in the wake of Thomas' public disclosure of his cancer condition.
- 7 March – Thomas Sanderling resigns as principal conductor of the Novosibirsk Philharmonic Orchestra, with immediate effect, in the wake of the 2022 Russian invasion of Ukraine.
- 10 March – The Teatro Carlo Felice announces the appointment of Riccardo Minasi as its next music director, for the period from 2022 to 2025.
- 14 March – Trinity Wall Street dismisses Julian Wachner as its director of music, with immediate effect, following its suspension of Wachner on 12 March 2022 after allegations against him of sexual misconduct.
- 23 March – The BBC announces that Paul Hughes is to stand down as director of the BBC Symphony Orchestra, the BBC Symphony Chorus, and the BBC Singers, effective 15 July 2022.
- 29 March – The Royal Albert Hall announces the appointment of four new associate artists, including Jess Gillam and Anna Lapwood.
- 31 March – English Touring Opera announces the appointment of Robin Norton-Hale as its next general director, effective July 2022.
- 5 April
  - The Tampere Philharmonic Orchestra announces that Santtu-Matias Rouvali is to conclude his tenure as chief conductor of the orchestra at the close of the 2022–2023 season.
  - The Baltimore Symphony Orchestra announces the appointment of Mark C. Hanson as its next president and chief executive officer, effective 21 April 2022.
- 8 April – The International Contemporary Ensemble announces the appointment of George E. Lewis as its next artistic director, effective April 2022.
- 11 April – The Orquesta Sinfónica del Principado de Asturias announces the appointment of Nuno Coelho as its next chief conductor, effective with the 2022–2023 season, with an initial contract of 3 years.
- 12 April
  - The Melbourne Chamber Orchestra announces the appointment of Sophie Rowell as its next artistic director, effective in 2023.
  - The Helsinki Philharmonic Orchestra announces the appointment of Jukka-Pekka Saraste as its next chief conductor, effective with the 2023–2024 season, with an initial contract of 3 years.
  - Andrés Orozco-Estrada resigns as chief conductor of the Vienna Symphony, with immediate effect.
  - The Rheingau Musik Festival announces Herbert Blomstedt as the recipient of the Rheingau Musik Preis 2022.
- 15 April – The San Antonio Symphony announces the revocation of Sebastian Lang-Lessing's status as its music director emeritus, with immediate effect.
- 25 April
  - The Philharmonia Orchestra announces the appointment of Thorben Dittes as its next chief executive, effective 1 August 2022.
  - Tafelmusik Baroque Orchestra announces that Elisa Citterio no longer holds the post of its music director.
- 27 April – The Queensland Symphony Orchestra announces the appointment of Yarmila Alfonzetti as its next chief executive, effective 11 July 2022.
- 4 May – The Taipei Chinese Orchestra announces the appointment of Yu-an Chang as its new principal conductor, with immediate effect.
- 6 May
  - The Staatskapelle Halle announces the appointment of Fabrice Bollon as its next Generalmusikdirektor (GMD), effective with the 2022–2023 season, with an initial contract of 5 years.
  - The Landestheater Schleswig-Holstein announces the resignation of Kimbo Ishii as its GMD, with immediate effect.
- 9 May – The San Francisco Conservatory of Music announces its purchase of the Pentatone record label.
- 10 May – The Juilliard String Quartet announces the appointment of Molly Carr as its new violist.
- 11 May – Opera Saratoga announces that Lawrence Edelson is to stand down as its artistic and general director at the end of July 2022.
- 12 May
  - The Latvian National Symphony Orchestra announces the appointment of Tarmo Peltokoski as its next music director and artistic director, effective with the 2022–2023 season.
  - The Berlin State Opera announces the appointment of Elisabeth Sobotka as its new Indentantin, effective September 2024.
- 17 May – The Birgit Nilsson Foundation announces Yo-Yo Ma as the recipient of the 2022 Birgit Nilsson Prize, the first instrumentalist ever to receive this award.
- 18 May – The Japan Philharmonic Orchestra announces the appointment of Wong Kah Chun as its next chief conductor, effective with the 2023–2024 season, with an initial contract of 5 years.
- 19 May – The Academy of St Martin in the Fields announces the appointment of Annie Lydford as its next chief executive, effective September 2022.
- 20 May – The Teatro Colón announces the appointment of Jan Lathan-Koenig as its next music director, effective in 2023.
- 21 May – The first night of the new Glyndebourne Festival Opera production of The Wreckers takes place, the first opera by a female composer to be staged at Glyndebourne, and the first professional staging of the opera with its original French libretto.
- 23 May
  - The BBC announces its new roster of New Generation Artists for the period 2022-2024:
    - Santiago Cañón-Valencia (cellist)
    - Ryan Corbett (accordionist)
    - Hugh Cutting (countertenor)
    - Leonkoro Quartet
    - Geneva Lewis (violinist)
    - Fergus McCreadie (jazz pianist)
    - Masabane Cecilia Rangwanasha (soprano)
  - The English Symphony Orchestra announces the appointment of Seb Lovell-Huckle as its next chief executive officer, effective 8 August 2022.
- 25 May – The Glimmerglass Festival announces the appointment of Robert Ainsley as its next artistic director and general director.
- 27 May – The Queensland Symphony Orchestra announces the appointment of Umberto Clerici as its next chief conductor, effective 1 January 2023, with an initial contract of three years.
- 31 May – The Association of British Orchestra announces that Mark Pemberton is to stand down as its chief executive at the end of September 2022.
- 1 June – Queen's Birthday Honours (Platinum Jubilee)
  - Stephen Hough is made a Knight Bachelor.
  - Chi-chi Nwanoku is made a Commander of the Order of the British Empire.
  - Harry Bicket and David Jackson are each made an Officer of the Order of the British Empire.
  - Julia Desbrulais and Elizabeth Llewellyn are each made a Member of the Order of the British Empire.
- 3 June – The inaugural International Conducting Competition in Rotterdam awards its first prize to British conductor Bertie Baigent.
- 5 June – Hayoung Choi is announced as the winner of the Queen Elisabeth Competition for cello, in Brussels.
- 10 June – The Royal Concertgebouw Orchestra announces the appointment of Klaus Mäkelä as its next chief conductor, effective with the 2027–2028 season, with an initial contract of 5 years. Mäkelä is scheduled to take the title of artistic partner for the period 2022-2027.
- 16 June – The board of directors of the San Antonio Symphony announces its decision to file for bankruptcy and to dissolve the organisation.
- 17 June – The New York Philharmonic simultaneously announces the scheduled departure of Deborah Borda as its president and chief executive officer (CEO), effective 30 June 2023, and the appointment of Gary Ginstling as its next president and CEO, effective 1 July 2023.
- 20 June – McGill University announces the closure of the McGill Conservatory of Music at the end of the summer of 2022.
- 21 June
  - The Orlando Consort announces that it is to disband in June 2023.
  - The Staatskapelle Dresden announces its election of Daniele Gatti as its next chief conductor, effective in 2024.
- 28 June – Opera Rara gives the first known performance of Il Proscritto by Saverio Mercadante since its 1842 premiere.
- 29 June
  - Tafelmusik Baroque Orchestra announces the departure of Carol Kehoe as its executive director.
  - François Girard is appointed an Officer of the Order of Canada.
- 5 July
  - Westminster Abbey announces the appointment of Andrew Nethsingha as its next organist and master of choristers, effective in 2023.
  - St. John's College, Cambridge announces that Andrew Nethsingha is to stand down as its director of music at the close of 2022.
- 11 July – The Lexington Philharmonic Orchestra announces the appointment of Mélisse Brunet as its next music director, the first female conductor ever named to the post, effective with the 2022–2023 season, with an initial contract of 5 years.
- 12 July – The Kyoto Symphony Orchestra announces the appointment of Nodoka Okisawa as its next music director, the first female conductor ever named to the post, effective in March 2023 season, with an initial contract of 3 years.
- 14 July – The Teatro Real announces the appointment of Gustavo Gimeno as its next music director, effective with the 2025–2026 season, with an initial contract of 5 years.
- 21 July
  - The Baltimore Symphony Orchestra announces the appointment of Jonathon Heyward as its next music director, the first conductor of colour ever named to the post, effective with the 2023–2024 season, with an initial contract of 5 seasons.
  - Tania León is announced as one of the laureates of the 45th Kennedy Center Honors.
- 24 July – Simon Estes sings his final opera performance, in the Des Moines Metro Opera production of Porgy and Bess, as 'Lawyer' Frazier.
- 28 July
  - The Minnesota Orchestra announces the appointment of Thomas Søndergård as its next music director, effective with the 2023–2024 season, with an initial contract of 5 seasons.
  - The Ukrainian Freedom Orchestra gives its first-ever concert at the Teatr Wielki-Polish National Opera in Warsaw, conducted by co-founder Keri-Lynn Wilson.
- 3 August – The Südwestdeutsche Philharmonie Konstanz announces the appointment of Gabriel Venzago as its next music director, effective 1 January 2023.
- 9 August – The Royal Albert Hall announces that Craig Hassall is to stand down as its chief executive officer in early 2023.
- 12 August – Pacific Opera Victoria announces that Timothy Vernon is to retire as its founding artistic director at the close of the 2022–2023 season.
- 24 August
  - Former musicians of the San Antonio Symphony announce the formation of the San Antonio Philharmonic.
  - The Carmel Bach Festival announces the appointment of Grete Pedersen as its next artistic director and principal conductor, the first woman to hold the posts.
- 4 September – The Seoul Philharmonic Orchestra announces the appointment of Jaap van Zweden as its next music director, effective January 2024, with an initial contract of 5 years.
- 6 September
  - The Meiningen State Theatre announces the appointment of Killian Farrell as its next Generalmusikdirektor, effective with the 2023–2024 season.
  - The Orchestre symphonique de Mulhouse announces the appointment of Christoph Koncz as its next music director, September 2023, with an initial contract of 3 years.
- 8 September
  - Opera North announces that Richard Mantle is to stand down as its general director at the end of 2023.
  - Following the death of HRH Queen Elizabeth II, the BBC Proms cancels the remaining three Proms of the 2022 season, including The Last Night, the first cancellation of The Last Night since 1944, thus de facto ending the 2022 Proms.
- 12 September – The BBC announces that Alan Davey is to stand down as controller of BBC Radio 3 in March 2023.
- 15 September – Krystian Zimerman is announced as the recipient of the 33rd Praemium Imperiale in Music.
- 19 September – The Pacific Symphony announces the intended conclusion of the tenure of Carl St.Clair as its music director at the end of the 2023–2024 season.
- 20 September
  - The Tampere Philharmonic Orchestra announces the appointment of Matthew Halls as its next chief conductor, effective with the 2023–2024 season, with an initial contract of 3 years.
  - The Ulster Orchestra announces Auveen Sands as its next chief executive, the first woman named to the post, effective at the end of October 2022.
  - The Borodin Quartet announces the appointment of Nikolai Sachenko as its new first violinist.
  - The American Composers Orchestra announces that Derek Bermel is to stand down as its artistic director at the close of 2022.
- 21 September – The San Francisco Symphony announces the appointment of Matthew Spivey as its next chief executive officer, with immediate effect.
- 22 September – Boston Lyric Opera announces the appointment of Bradley Vernatter as its next general director and chief executive officer, with immediate effect.
- 25 September – The Glenn Gould Foundation announces Gustavo Dudamel as the 14th Glenn Gould Prize Laureate.
- 27 September – The Cleveland Orchestra announces that it is the recipient of the autograph manuscript of Gustav Mahler's Symphony No. 2, gifted and donated by Herbert G. Kloiber.
- 28 September – The city of Heidelberg announces that Elias Grandy is to conclude his tenure as the city's Generalmusikdirektor at the close of the 2022–2023 season.
- 30 September
  - The New World Symphony announces the appointment of Stéphane Denève as its next artistic director, with immediate effect.
  - The SWR Symphonieorchester announces simultaneously the scheduled departure of Teodor Currentzis as its chief conductor at the close of the 2024–2025 season, and the appointment of François-Xavier Roth as its next chief conductor, with an initial contract of 5 years.
- 4 October – Daniel Barenboim announces via Twitter his intention to withdraw from performance for an indefinite period, because of deteriorating health, including a neurological condition.
- 17 October – The Royal Opera House announces the appointment of Jakub Hrůša as its next music director, effective in September 2025.
- 19 October – English National Opera announces the departure of Stuart Murphy as its chief executive officer as of September 2023.
- 20 October – The Aalborg Symphony Orchestra announces the appointment of Joshua Weilerstein as its next chief conductor, effective with the 2023–2024 season, with an initial contract of 3 seasons.
- 25 October – Fort Worth Opera announces the resignation of Afton Battle as its general and artistic director, effective 23 November 2022.
- 3 November – The Gulbenkian Orchestra announces the appointment of Hannu Lintu as its next chief conductor, effective with the 2023–2024 season.
- 4 November – Arts Council England announces its grant recipients for 2023-2026, which include the complete elimination of its subsidy for English National Opera.
- 7 November – The City of Birmingham Symphony Orchestra announces that Stephen Maddock is to stand down as its chief executive at the end of April 2023.
- 14 November – The Handel and Haydn Society announces the appointment of Jonathan Cohen as its next artistic director, effective with the 2023–2024 season, with an initial contract of 5 seasons.
- 17 November – Fort Worth Opera announces the appointment of Angela Turner Wilson as its next general and artistic director, effective 12 December 2022.
- 21 November
  - The Lucerne Festival announces that Michael Haefliger is to stand down as its Intendant at the close of the 2024–2025 season.
  - Detroit Opera announces the appointment of Roberto Kalb as its next music director, with immediate effect, with a contract through the close of the 2025–2026 season.
- 25 November – The Kristiansand Symphony Orchestra announces that Nathalie Stutzmann is to stand down as its chief conductor at the close of the 2022–2023 season.
- 28 November – The Virginia Symphony Orchestra announces the appointment of Andrea F. Warren as its new president and chief executive officer, the first African-American woman named to the post, effective 1 December 2022.
- 29 November – The BBC Philharmonic announces the appointment of John Storgårds as its chief conductor, with immediate effect.
- 30 November – The Kristiansand Symphony Orchestra announces the appointment of Julian Rachlin as its next chief conductor, effective with the 2023–2024 season.
- 1 December
  - The Sydney Symphony Orchestra announces the appointment of Craig Whitehead as its chief executive officer (CEO), from his prior interim CEO status, with immediate effect.
  - The Danish National Vocal Ensemble (DR Vokalensemblet) announces the appointment of Martina Batič as its next chief conductor, effective August 2023.
- 5 December – The Grawemeyer Awards announce Julian Anderson as the recipient of the 2023 Grawemeyer Award for Music Composition, for his cello concerto Litanies.
- 7 December – The Utah Symphony announces the appointment of David Robertson as its first-ever creative partner, effective with the 2023–2024 season, with a contract of 3 years.
- 8 December
  - The John F. Kennedy Center for the Performing Arts announces the appointment of Jennifer Koh as the new artistic director of the Fortas Chamber Music Concerts, with immediate effect, and with an initial contract through the spring of 2026.
  - The Metropolitan Opera announces that its website and box office were the victims of a cyberattack earlier in the week.
  - The musicians of the Fort Wayne Philharmonic take industrial action, going on strike for the first time in the orchestra's history.
- 9 December – The San Francisco Conservatory of Music announces its acquisition of the Askonas Holt arts management agency.
- 13 December – The Orchestre national du Capitole de Toulouse announces the appointment of Tarmo Peltokoski as its next music director, effective with the 2024–2025 season, with an initial contract of 4 seasons.
- 14 December
  - The Orchestre symphonique de Québec announces the appointment of Clemens Schuldt as its next music director, effective with the 2023–2024 season, with an initial contract of 4 seasons.
  - The Orion String Quartet announces its intention to retire and disband at the end of the 2023–2024 season.
- 15 December
  - The City of London Sinfonia announces the appointment of Rowan Rutter as its newest chief executive officer, effective April 2023.
  - The American Composers Orchestra announces the appointment of Curtis Stewart as its new artistic director, with immediate effect.
- 16 December – The Boston Symphony Orchestra announces simultaneously the resignation of Gail Samuel as its president and chief executive officer (CEO), effective 3 January 2023, and the appointment of Jeffrey D. Dunn as its interim president and CEO, effective 4 January 2023.
- 19 December – Opera Australia announces the appointment of Jo Davies as its new artistic director, the first woman to be named to the post, effective November 2023.

== New works ==
The following composers' works were composed, premiered, or published this year, as noted in the citation.

=== A ===
- Thomas Adès – Növények
- Bruce Adolphe – In the Same Breath
- Julia Adolphe – Makeshift Castle
- Julian Anderson – Symphony No. 2 (Prague Panoramas)

=== B ===
- Richard Baker – The Price of Curiosity
- Katherine Balch – Illuminate
- Nina Barzegar – Inexorable Passage
- Mason Bates
  - Piano Concerto
  - Rhapsody of Steve Jobs
- Sally Beamish – Hive (concerto for harp and orchestra)
- Jackson Berkey – Homage to Emily Dickinson
- Luke Blackburn – Concrete Currents
- Sasha Blondeau – Atlas III : They
- John Borstlap – Violin Concerto No. 2 ("Dreamscape Voyage")
- Charlotte Bray
  - Forsaken
  - 'The Earth Cried Out to the Sky' (settings of English translations of texts by Borys Humenyuk and Ostap Slyvynsky)

=== C ===
- Unsuk Chin – Scherben der Stille (Shards of Silence), for violin and orchestra
- Joe Chindamo – Ligeia (trombone concerto)
- Christian Winther Christensen – Children's Songs
- Guillaume Connesson – Astéria
- Erland Cooper – Window over Rackwick
- John Corigliano – Triathlon, Concerto for Saxophonist and Orchestra
- Leah Curtis – Infinite Possibilities
- Jonathan Cziner – Celestial Symphony

=== D ===
- Brett Dean (music) and Matthew Jocelyn (text) – In This Brief Moment
- Zosha Di Castri – In the half-light

=== E ===
- Melody Eötvös – When It Hits the Ocean Below

=== F ===
- Ben Fan – A Quiet Mountain
- Iain Farrington – A Party for Auntie
- Ross Fiddes – Toasting Mother Earth
- Graham Fitkin – Bla, Bla, Bla
- Erika Fox – David spielt vor Saul (Piano Concerto)

=== G ===
- Stacy Garrop – Goddess Triptych
- Elliot Gyger – Concerto for Orchestra
- Malte Giesen – stock footage piece 2: type beats
- Detlev Glanert – String Quartet No. 3
- Philip Glass – Symphony No. 13
- Alexander Goehr – Double Chaconne with Gaps
- Michael Gordon – Travel Guide to Nicaragua
- Helen Grime – Trumpet Concerto: night-sky-blue
- HK Gruber – Short Stories from the Vienna Woods (selections)
- Hildur Guðnadóttir – The Fact of the Matter

=== H ===
- Georg Friedrich Haas – weiter und weiter und weiter....
- Adolphus Hailstork – Evensong (A Suite of Nocturnes)
- John Harbison – Winter Journey (texts by Louise Glück)
- Arnulf Herrmann – Ein Kinderlied (Dämonen)
- Gavin Higgins – Concerto Grosso for Brass Band and Orchestra
- Gavin Higgins (music) and Francesca Simon (text) – The Faerie Bride
- Rozalie Hirs – artemis
- Simon Holt – The Sower
- Emily Howard – Elliptics

=== I ===
- Carlos Izcaray – Under the Shadows, An Immigrant's Journey

=== J ===
- Joel Järventausta – Sunfall
- Betsy Jolas – bTunes

=== K ===
- Matthew Kaner (music) and Simon Armitage (text) – Pearl
- Elena Kats-Chernin – Red Centre Suite
- Hannah Kendall – shouting forever into the receiver
- Malika Kishino – Wolkenatlas
- György Kurtág – Circumdederunt...in memoriam Rita Wagner
- Jaakko Kuusisto – Symphony, Op. 39 (completed by Pekka Kuusisto)

=== L ===
- Sophie Lacaze – Soupirs d'étoiles
- Robert Laidlow – Silicon
- Mauro Lanza – Gretchen and the fragment on machines
- Ana Leira Carnero – Adagio for Solo Violin
- Sarah Lianne Lewis – Tourmaline
- Magnus Lindberg – Third Piano Concerto
- Jimmy López Bellido
  - Piano Concerto
  - Airs for Mother

=== M ===
- Thomas Meadowcroft – Forever Turnarounds
- Philipp Maintz – red china green house
- John Metcalf – Calm
- Sir James MacMillan – 'Who shall separate us from the love of Christ?'
- Missy Mazzoli – Violin Concerto (Procession)
- Alex Mills – Landsker
- Conor Mitchell – Look Both Ways (text excerpts by Peter Pears and Benjamin Britten)
- Nico Muhly – Bright Idea
- Jeffrey Mumford – brightness dispersed

=== O ===
- Gabriela Ortiz – Clara
- Nigel Osborne – A Short History of Polish Philosophy

=== P ===
- Andreia Pinto Correia – Os pássaros da noite (The Birds of Night)

=== R ===
- Ilias Rachaniotis – Sommernachtstanz
- Marco-Adrián Ramos – Woven clay for the death of Mario Lavista (Quartet II)
- Claire Victoria Roberts – Like Ships Adrift
- David Roche – Waves of Love
- Lula Romero – Parallax
- Jon Rose and Hollis Taylor – Bullen Road 2016
- Joey Roukens
  - Symphony No. 1
  - Bosch Requiem
- Peter Ruzicka – Eingedunkelt (for violin, chamber choir and orchestra)

=== S ===
- Christopher Sainsbury – In the beginning, fun
- Benjamin Scheer – The Funambulist's Double
- Iris ter Schiphorst – HYPER-DUB
- Martin Schüttler – i wd leave leaf & dance
- Roberto Sierra – Sonata No. 9
- Carlos Simon (composer) – The Best Cuisine
- Sarah Kirkland Snider – Forward Into Light (premiere delayed from 2020)
- Tyshawn Sorey – Monochromatic Light (Afterlife)
- Roger Stubblefield – Reveries, op. 25
- Jack Symonds
  - Guardare, meravigliarsi... Nocturnes No. 1, 2
  - String Quartet No. 2

=== T ===
- Dobrinka Tabakova – Missa brevis
- Josh Taylor
  - Toccatina
  - Evening Stroll
  - Cat and Mouse
- Augusta Read Thomas – Bebop Riddle II
- Anna S. Þorvaldsdóttir – ARCHORA
- Joan Tower
  - Beauty and the Beast
  - Into the Night
- Calliope Tsoupaki – Perasma
- Natalia Tsupryk – A Quiet Night – Tyhoyi Nochi

=== V ===
- Carl Vine – Concord (clarinet quintet)

=== W ===
- Judith Weir – Like as the hart
- Nigel Westlake – Concerto for Trumpet and Orchestra
- Scott Wheeler
  - Sextet
  - Lies I Tell Myself (text by Eva H.D.)
- Julia Wolfe – Her Story
- Joanna Wozny – Blenden | Tilgungen

=== X ===
- Xi Wang – Ensō

=== Z ===
- Artur Zagajewski – Danses Polonaises
- Sauli Zinovjev
  - Piano Concerto
  - an Adagio
- Agata Zubel – Outside the Realm of Time

== New operas ==
- Ricky Ian Gordon and Michael Korie – The Garden of the Finzi-Continis
- Mats Larsson Gothe and Susanne Marko – Löftet (The Promise)
- Rose Hall and Katie Colombus – It's the Little Things
- Anna Braithwaite and Kerry Priest – The Hardest Journey
- Victoria Bernath and Teresa Howard – Mini-Break
- Joanna Taylor and Kerry Priest – I Just Wanna Be (in Center Parcs)
- Sarah Lianne Lewis and Sophia Chapadjiev – The Parting Place
- Laura Reid and Oge Nwosu – Detritus
- Georgia Barnes and Olivia Bell – Everything you carry
- Du Yun and Michael Joseph McQuilken – In Our Daughter's Eyes
- Thierry Escaich and Atiq Rahimi – Shirine (premiere delayed from 2020)
- Wim Henderickx and Krystian Lada – De Bekeeerlinge (The Convert)
- Rhiannon Giddens and Michael Abels – Omar
- Tom Coult and Alice Birch – Violet
- Tobias Picker and Aryeh Lev Stollman – Awakenings (premiere delayed from 2020)
- Stewart Wallace and Michael Korie – Harvey Milk (revised 2-act version)
- Will Todd (music), David Pountney, Sarah Woods, Edson Burton, Miles Chambers, Eric Ngalle Charles, Shreya Sen-Handley (librettists) – Migrations
- Laura Bowler and Laura Lomas – The Blue Woman
- Kristin Kuster and Mark Campbell – A Thousand Acres
- Huang Ruo and David Henry Hwang – M. Butterfly (premiere delayed from 2020)
- John Adams – Antony and Cleopatra
- Georg Friedrich Haas and Harriet Scott Chessman – Sycorax
- Connor D'Netto (music), Kate Miller-Heidke and Keir Nuttall (librettists), and Ali McGregor (concept) – The Call
- Oliver Leith and Matt Copson – Last Days
- Peter Knell and Stephanie Fleischmann – Arkhipov
- Gabriela Lena Frank and Nilo Cruz – El Último Sueño de Frida y Diego
- Anna Appleby and Niall Campbell – Drought
- Kevin Puts and Greg Pierce – The Hours

== Albums ==
- Christopher Gunning – Symphony No. 5, String Quartet No. 1 (first recordings)
- Gerald Barry – Alice's Adventures Under Ground (first recording)
- Mieczysław Weinberg – The Passenger (first commercial CD recording)
- Huang Ruo – A Dust in Time (first recording)
- Sasha Cooke (mezzo-soprano) and Kirill Kuzmin (piano) – how do i find you (first recordings), with songs by:
  - Caroline Shaw
  - Kamala Sankaram (text by Mark Campbell)
  - Matt Boehler (text by Todd Boss)
  - Missy Mazzoli (text by Royce Vavrek)
  - John Glover (text by Kelley Rourke)
  - Rene Orth (text by Colleen Murphy)
  - Christopher Cerrone (text by John K. Samson)
  - Gabriel Kahane
  - Andrew Marshall (text by Todd Boss)
  - Huang Ruo (text by David Henry Hwang)
  - Timo Andres (text by Lola Ridge)
  - Nico Muhly (text by Thomas Traherne)
  - Hilary Purrington (text by Mark Campbell)
  - Lembit Beecher (text by Liza Balkan)
  - Frances Pollock (text by Emily Roller)
  - Joel Thompson (text by Gene Scheer)
  - Jimmy López Bellido (text by Mark Campbell)
- George Walker – Five Piano Sonatas (first integral recording; Steven Beck, piano)
- La Monte Young – Trio for Strings (first authorized recording)
- Joseph Phibbs and Laurie Slade – Juliana (first recording)
- Michael Tippett – The Midsummer Marriage (first complete, uncut recording)
- Francis Poulenc – Les Animaux modèles, Sinfonietta, Les Mariés de la Tour Eiffel – 'La Baigneuse de Tronville' & 'Discours du général', L'Éventail de Jeanne – 'Pastourelle' (BBC Concert Orchestra, Bramwell Tovey – Tovey's final recording)
- Rebecca Saunders – Skin, Void, Unbreathed (first recordings)

== Deaths ==
- 1 January – Richard Freed, American music critic, radio broadcaster and arts administrator, 93
- 2 January – András Ágoston, Hungarian violinist and past leader of the Philharmonia Hungarica, 74
- 5 January – Dale Clevenger, American orchestral French horn player and past principal French horn of the Chicago Symphony Orchestra, 81
- 9 January
  - Maria Ewing, American soprano, 71
  - James Maraniss, American literary scholar and academic, and librettist for the opera Life Is a Dream, 76
- 10 January – Francis Jackson, British organist and composer, 104
- 12 January – Everett Lee, American conductor, 105
- 13 January – Terry Teachout, American critic, playwright and opera librettist, 65
- 14 January – Angelo Gilardino, Italian composer, guitarist and musicologist, 80
- 16 January – Lucy Rowan Mann, American music administrator, 100 (from COVID-19)
- 17 January – Ann Spurbeck, American orchestral violinist, 84
- 18 January
  - Paavo Heininen, Finnish composer, 84
  - Rafael Rojas, Mexican tenor, 59
  - Roger Tapping, British violist resident in the US and past violist of the Takács Quartet, 61
- 19 January – Nigel Rogers, British tenor and early music specialist, 86
- 20 January
  - Juro Mětšk, Serbian composer, 67
  - Karolos Trikolidis, Greek-Austrian conductor, 74
- 26 January – Alexander Paul DePue, American violinist, 49
- 27 January
  - Alain Bancquart, French composer and conductor, 87
  - Georg Christoph Biller, German choral conductor, composer, baritone and pedagogue, 66
- 30 January
  - Wieslaw Rekucki, Polish violist and pedagogue, 64
  - John Woolf, British orchestral violinist and concert impresario, 91
- 1 February – Leslie Parnas, American cellist, 90
- 3 February – Quintin Ballardie, British violist and founder of the English Chamber Orchestra, 93
- 6 February
  - Hans Neuenfels, German theatre and opera director, and opera librettist, 80 (from COVID-19)
  - George Crumb, American composer, 92
- 9 February – Joseph Horovitz, Austria-born British composer, 95
- 10 February – Rolf Wollrad, German bass and opera administrator, 84
- 12 February – William Kraft, American composer, percussionist, and conductor, 98
- 14 February – Bernard Jacobson, UK-born arts administrator, author and critic based in the USA, 85
- 18 February – Yoichiro Omachi, Japanese conductor, 90
- 19 February – Nigel Butterley, Australian composer 86
- 21 February – Julie Ann Giacobassi, American orchestral English horn player, 72
- 23 February
  - Carlos Barbosa-Lima, Brazilian guitarist, 77
  - Jaakko Kuusisto, Finnish composer, 48
- 4 March – Iwan Edwards, Welsh-born choral conductor resident in Canada, 84
- 7 March – Jan Welmers, Dutch organist and composer, 84
- 8 March – René Clemencic, Austrian composer, conductor and early music instrumentalist, 94
- 10 March – Annerose Schmidt, German pianist and pedagogue, 85
- 13 March – Li Guangxi, Chinese tenor, 92
- 18 March – Bernabé Martí, Spanish tenor, 93
- 19 March – Michail Jurowski, Russian conductor, 77
- 20 March – Lyell Cresswell, New Zealand-born composer resident in the UK, 77
- 25 March – Hans Priem, German orchestral violist, 95
- 27 March – Karl Korte, American composer, 91
- 28 March
  - Franz Mohr, German-born American piano technician, 94
  - Anne Parsons, American orchestra administrator, 64
- 29 March
  - Paul Goodchild, Australian orchestral trumpeter, 61
  - Jonathan Pegis, American orchestral cellist, 61
- 31 March – Joseph Kalichstein, Israel-born American pianist, 76
- 5 April – Boris Brott, Canadian conductor, 78
- 11 April – Philippe Boesmans, Belgian composer, 85
- 17 April – Radu Lupu, Romanian pianist, 76
- 18 April
  - Sir Harrison Birtwistle, British composer, 87
  - Janez Matičič, Slovenian composer and pianist, 95
  - Michael Jinbo, American conductor and music school administrator, 60
- 19 April – Nicholas Angelich, USA-born pianist resident in France, 51
- 29 April
  - Plato Karayanis, American baritone and arts administrator, 93
  - Donald Peck, American orchestral flutist, 92
- 30 April
  - Meinard Kraak, Dutch baritone, 86
  - Max Riebl, Australian countertenor, 30
- 9 May – Minoru Nojima, Japanese pianist, 76
- 11 May – Alexander Toradze, Russian pianist, 69
- 12 May – William Bennett, British flautist, 86
- 13 May
  - Teresa Berganza, Spanish mezzo-soprano and contralto, 89
  - Simon Preston, British organist and choirmaster, 83
- 18 May – Anne Howells, British mezzo-soprano, 81
- 31 May – Ingram Marshall, American composer, 80
- 3 June – Peter Barber, New Zealander orchestral violist, 64
- 8 June – David Lloyd-Jones, British conductor and co-founder of Opera North, 87
- 20 June – Kurt Equiluz, Austrian tenor, 93
- 1 July – Richard Taruskin, American musicologist, 77
- 2 July – Peter Brook, British theatre and opera director, 97
- 3 July – Joseph Banowetz, American pianist, pedagogue, writer and scholar, 87
- 5 July – Alfred Koerppen, German composer, organist and pedagogue, 95
- 10 July – Andrew Ball, British pianist, 72
- 12 July
  - Bramwell Tovey, British conductor and composer, 69
  - Jan Wijn, Dutch pianist, 88
- 20 July
  - Alice Harnoncourt, Austrian period-instrument violinist and co-founder of the Concentus Musicus Wien, 91
  - Jeroen van Riel, Dutch recording executive, 52
- 21 July – Marcus Blunt, British composer, 75
- 22 July – Stefan Soltesz, Hungarian conductor active in Austria and Germany, 73
- 23 July – Marie Leonhardt, Swiss period-instrument violinist and co-founder of the Leonhardt Consort, 93
- 25 July – Martin How, British composer and organist, 91
- 8 August – Larry Rachleff, American conductor and pedagogue, 67
- 15 August – Daphne Godson, British violinist and founding member of the Scottish Baroque Ensemble, 90
- 16 August – Matti Lehtinen, Finnish baritone, 100
- 20 August – Franz Hummel, German composer and pianist, 83
- 24 August – Martyn van den Hoek, Dutch pianist, pedagogue, and composer, 54
- 1 September – Frederick Zlotkin, American cellist, 75
- 4 September
  - Pieter van den Berg, Dutch bass, 96
  - Klaus Weise, German conductor, 86
- 5 September – Lars Vogt, German pianist and conductor, 51
- 9 September – Jorja Fleezanis, American violinist, pedagogue, and past concertmaster (leader) of the Minnesota Orchestra, 70
- 11 September – Ron Reuben, American orchestral bass clarinetist, 90
- 13 September – Jörg Faerber, German conductor and founder of the Württemberg Chamber Orchestra Heilbronn, 93
- 18 September – Wolfgang Güttler, German-Romanian orchestral double bass player, 77
- 2 October – Béla Szakcsi Lakatos, Hungarian pianist and composer, 79
- 4 October – Jean Gallois, French musicologist, historian, violinist and critic, 93
- 7 October – Toshi Ichiyanagi, Japanese composer, 89
- 12 October – James A. Rago, American orchestral timpanist, 79
- 17 October – Michael Ponti, American-born pianist resident in Germany, 84
- 19 October
  - Geoff Nuttall, American-Canadian cellist and founding member of the St. Lawrence String Quartet, 56
  - Joanna Simon, American mezzo-soprano, 85
- 20 October – Atarah Ben-Tovim, British flautist and children's concert presenter, 82
- 23 October
  - Galina Pisarenko, Russian soprano, voice pedagogue and theatre director, 88
  - Libor Pešek, Czech conductor, 89
- 25 October
  - Branislav Hronec, Slovak composer, conductor, pianist and pedagogue, 81
  - Farquhar Wilkinson, New Zealander cellist, 90
- 30 October – Jan Jansen, Dutch orchestral oboist, 64
- 5 November – Daniele Barioni, Italian tenor, 92
- 7 November – Dietrich Gerhardt, German orchestral violist, 94
- 9 November – Oleksandr Kostin, Ukrainian composer and pedagogue, 83
- 13 November – Frederick Swann, American organist, 91
- 17 November – Azio Corghi, Italian composer, musicologist, and pedagogue, 85
- 18 November – Ned Rorem, American composer, 99
- 21 November – Bruce Coppock, American orchestra administrator, 71
- 27 November – Gerwin Hoekstra, Dutch organist, 30
- 30 November – Glynne Adams, New Zealand violist, 94
- 1 December – Bridgette A. Wimberly, American playwright and librettist for Charlie Parker's Yardbird, 68
- 2 December – Laila Storch, American orchestral oboist and pedagogue, 101
- 3 December – Volodymyr Kozhukhar, Ukrainian conductor and pedagogue, 81
- 5 December – Jost Meier, Swiss composer and conductor, 83
- 6 December – Edino Krieger, Brazilian composer, conductor, critic and record producer, 83
- 10 December – John Aler, American tenor, 73
- 13 December – Bayan Northcott, British music critic, pedagogue, and composer, 82
- 15 December – Oqtay Radjabov, Azerbaijani composer, pedagogue, and writer, 81
- 17 December
  - Elayne Jones, American orchestral percussionist, 94
  - Urmas Sisask, Estonian composer, 62
- 18 December – Wim Henderickx, Belgian composer, percussionist and pedagogue, 60
- 19 December – Stanley Drucker, American orchestral clarinetist, 93
- 23 December – David Johnson Dalton, American viola player, author, and pedagogue, 88
- 27 December
  - Alain Bernheim, French pianist, 91
  - Béla Dekany, Hungarian-born violinist active in the United Kingdom, 94
- 29 December
  - Matthieu Acar, French pianist, 34
  - Eduard Artemyev, Russian composer, 85
- 31 December – Pietro Spada, Italian pianist, musicologist and pedagogue, 87

== Major awards ==
- 2022 Pulitzer Prize Winner in Music: Raven Chacon – Voiceless Mass

=== Grammy Awards ===
- Best Chamber Music/Small Ensemble Performance: Beethoven: Cello Sonatas – "Hope Amid Tears"; Yo-Yo Ma and Emanuel Ax (Sony Classical)
- Best Choral Performance: Mahler: Symphony No. 8 (Symphony of A Thousand); Leah Crocetto, Mihoko Fujimura, Ryan McKinny, Erin Morley, Tamara Mumford, Simon O'Neill, Morris Robinson, Tamara Wilson; Los Angeles Philharmonic; Los Angeles Children's Chorus, Los Angeles Master Chorale, National Children's Chorus and Pacific Chorale; Gustavo Dudamel, conductor; Grant Gershon, Robert Istad, Fernando Malvar-Ruiz, and Luke McEndarfer, chorus masters (Deutsche Grammophon)
- Best Classical Compendium: "Women Warriors – The Voices of Change" – Lolita Ritmanis, Miriam Cutler, Penka Kouneva, Starr Parodi, Sharon Farber, Nathalie Bonin, Anne-Kathrin Dern; Amy Andersson, conductor; Amy Andersson, Mark Mattson, and Lolita Ritmanis, producers
- Best Classical Instrumental Solo: Alone Together (works by Wang Lu, Joungbum Lee, Morgan Guerin, Vijay Iyer, Sarah Gibson, Darian Donovan Thomas, Tonia Ko, Thomas Kotcheff, Nina C. Young, Adeliia Faizullina, Jen Shyu, Inti Figgis-Vizueta, Ellen Reid; Rajna Swaminathan, Anthony Cheung, Tomás Gueglio-Saccone, Anjna Swaminathan, Layale Chaker, David Serkin Ludwig, Elizabeth Younan, Rafiq Bhatia, Hanna Benn, Missy Mazzoli, Cassie Wieland, Katherine Balch, Andrew Norman, Angélica Negrón, Tania León, Caroline Davis, Nina Shekhar, Qasim Naqvi, Shayna Dunkelman, Du Yun, George E. Lewis, Lester St. Louis, Sugar Vendil, Patrick Castillo, Vincent Calianno, Kati Agócs); Jennifer Koh (Çedille Records)
- Best Contemporary Classical Composition: Caroline Shaw: "Narrow Sea"; Dawn Upshaw, Gilbert Kalish, and So Percussion) (Nonesuch Records)
- Best Classical Solo Vocal Album: Mythologies; Sangeeta Kaur, Hila Plitmann; Danaë Xanthe Vlasse
- Best Opera Recording: Philip Glass – Akhnaten; J'Nai Bridges, Anthony Roth Costanzo, Zachary James, Dísella Lárusdóttir; The Metropolitan Opera Orchestra and The Metropolitan Opera Chorus; Karen Kamensek, conductor; David Frost, producer (Metropolitan Opera)
- Best Engineered Album, Classical: Chanticleer Sings Christmas; Leslie Ann Jones, engineer; Michael Romanowski, mastering engineer
- Best Orchestral Performance: Florence Price – Symphonies Nos. 1 and 3; The Philadelphia Orchestra; Yannick Nézet-Séguin, conductor (Deutsche Grammophon)
- Producer of the Year, Classical: Judith Sherman

=== Gramophone Classical Music Awards 2022 ===
- Chamber: Round Midnight; Quatuor Ebène; Antoine Tamestit; Nicolas Altstaedt (Erato)
- Choral: J. S. Bach – St Matthew Passion; Julian Prégardien, Stéphane Degout, Sabine Devieilhe, Pygmalion / Raphaël Pichon (Harmonia Mundi)
- Concerto: Bartók. Beethoven. Berg: Violin Concertos; Frank Peter Zimmermann; Berlin Philharmonic; Alan Gilbert, Daniel Harding, Kirill Petrenko
- Contemporary: Hans Abrahamsen – The Snow Queen; Barbara Hannigan, Peter Rose, Katarina Dalayman, Rachael Wilson, Caroline Wettergreen; Chorus and Orchestra of the Bavarian State Opera / Cornelius Meister (Bavarian State Opera Recordings) Early Music: Josquin – Baisiez Moy; Thélème / Jean-Christophe Groffe (Aparté)
- Instrumental: Ysaÿe – Six Solo Violin Sonatas; James Ehnes (Onyx)
- Opera: Korngold – Die tote Stadt; Jonas Kaufmann, Marlis Petersen, Andrzej Filończyk, Jennifer Johnston, Mirjam Mesak, Corinna Scheurle, Manuel Günther, Dean Power; Choruses of the Bavarian State Opera; Bavarian State Orchestra / Kirill Petrenko (Bavarian State Opera Recordings; DVD, first DVD ever to receive this award)
- Orchestral: Mahler – Symphony No. 7; Bayerisches Staatsorchester / Kirill Petrenko (Bavarian State Opera Recordings)
- Piano: Beethoven – Diabelli Variations; Dame Mitsuko Uchida (Decca Classics)
- Song: Rachmaninov: Songs – Dissonance; Asmik Grigorian; Lukas Geniušas (Alpha)
- Voice and Ensemble: BariTenor – Michael Spyres; Strasbourg Philharmonic Orchestra / Marko Letonja (Erato)
- Recording of the Year: Korngold – Die tote Stadt; Jonas Kaufmann, Marlis Petersen, Andrzej Filończyk, Jennifer Johnston, Mirjam Mesak, Corinna Scheurle, Manuel Günther, Dean Power; Choruses of the Bavarian State Opera; Bavarian State Orchestra / Kirill Petrenko (Bavarian State Opera Recordings)
- Artist of the Year: Barbara Hannigan
- Concept Album: Enargeia – Emily D'Angelo; Das Freie Orchester Berlin / Jarkko Riihimäki (Deutsche Grammophon)
- Label of the Year: Chandos
- Lifetime Achievement: Daniel Barenboim
- Orchestra of the Year: Budapest Festival Orchestra
- Spatial Audio: Ravel – Orchestral Works; Sinfonia of London / John Wilson (Chandos)
- Young Artist of the Year: Johan Dalene
