= Monster's Paradise =

Opera by Olga Neuwirth

Monster's Paradise is an opera by composer and librettist Olga Neuwirth, librettist Elfriede Jelinek, and director Tobias Kratzer. The opera premiered on 2 February 2026 at the Hamburg State Opera, Germany.

The opera is written in Grand Guignol style, including satire and horror. One of the main characters is a gluttonous, insatiable President-King with a diaper and a golden necktie in an oval office. The main themes of the opera are the risk of the President-King ending the world, and actions to stop it from happening.

== Credits ==
The full credits for Monster's Paradise are listed on the opera's page in the Hamburg State Opera website.

=== Creative and production team ===
- Composer – Olga Neuwirth
- Librettist – Elfriede Jelinek
- Musical Direction – Titus Engel
- Stage Director – Tobias Kratzer
- Co-Director – Matthias Piro
- Set and Costume Design – Rainer Sellmaier
- Video Design – Jonas Dahl and Janic Bebi
- Live Electronics – Markus Noisternig
- Sound Design and Samples – Oliver Brunbauer and Olga Neuwirth
- Sound Mixing – Julien Aléonard
- Lighting – Michael Bauer
- Chorus Director – Christian Günther
- Children's and Youth Chorus Director – Priscilla Prueter
- Dramaturgy – Christopher Warmuth

=== Principal cast and performers ===
- Vampi – Sarah Defrise (singer) / Sylvie Rohrer (actress)
- Bampi – Kristina Stanek (singer) / Ruth Rosenfeld (actress)
- The King-President – Georg Nigl
- Gorgonzilla – Anna Clementi
- Mickey, the King's Adjutant I / The King's Doppelgänger / Angel of Death II – Andrew Watts
- Tuckey, the King's Adjutant / Angel of Death I – Eric Jurenas
- A Bear – Ruben Drole
- Miss Piggy - Henrik Roigaard
- The Goddess – Charlotte Rampling (video projection)

=== Musical ensemble and choruses ===
- Drum kit – Lucas Niggli
- Electric guitar – Seth Josel
- "Out-of-tune pianos" pianists – Elisabeth Leonskaja and Alexandra Stychkina
- Chorus of the Hamburg State Opera
- Alsterspatzen (Children's and Youth Chorus of the Hamburg State Opera)
- Extras of the Hamburg State Opera

== Overview ==
The storyline centers on two vampiresses, Vampi (Elfriede Jelinek) and Bampi (Olga Neuwirth), who journey around the world and attempt to halt a destructive ruler modeled after U.S. President Donald Trump, the King-President (Georg Nigl), at one point depicted to the audience as a gigantic baby-like figure wearing a diaper and a golden necktie. The despot's character was inspired by King Ubu (from Alfred Jarry's play Ubu Roi), commented on by playwright Jelinek as "the most accurate depiction of a gluttonous, table-thumping, spoiled child. He always demands an extra scoop of ice cream for dessert … [S]uch monsters [are] somewhat amusing at first glance, yet terrifying upon closer inspection. One can only portray such figures in a monstrous way, although Trump is nearly impossible to caricature." Composer Neuwirth compared the effect of Monster's Paradise to that of Charles Chaplin's The Great Dictator by stating: "People of power are always afraid of humor … because they are afraid to be laughed at. They have this ego, which is not allowed to be questioned."

Gorgonzilla is a sea monster spawned by a nuclear accident, being antagonistic to the President-King and an ambiguous force towards the outcome of the plot. Director Tobias Kratzer commented: "Maybe the king is [Vladimir] Putin and [Donald] Trump is Gorgonzilla – or the other way around. … No, Putin isn't Gorgonzilla. … Gorgonzilla is more like a world savior, clumsy because monsters are often large and misshapen. … He claims to rule through his mind, while the king rules through election results – both likely deceive themselves." Originally intended to be the world-famous kaiju, the "not-Godzilla-due-to-copyright" name is likely a pun on gorgonzola cheese (one reviewer writes that the creature "devours Trump as easily as a cheese sandwich") and potentially evocative of the Gorgons (monsters from Greek mythology associated with the sea).

Mickey and Tuckey (the first characterized as Mickey Mouse), played by countertenors Andrew Watts and Eric Jurenas, are the President-King's adjutants, patterned after Elon Musk and Mark Zuckerberg respectively, and sing lines such as "Nobody has such high numbers as you".

Charlotte Rampling portrays the Goddess, an entity seen in video projections who spouts platitudes in English and defends nature and civilization, being staged in a manner reminiscent of the Sun Baby character from Teletubbies.

Other absurd elements featured include four scantily-clad, pole-dancing Disney princesses; Kermit the Frog and Miss Piggy masks worn by some cast members; and various chorus singers dressed and behaving like zombies.
