= Sarah Defrise =

Belgian soprano

- Born: Brussels, Belgium
- Occupations: Opera singer (soprano); Composer
- Years active: 2014–present
- Website: sarah-defrise.com

Sarah Defrise is a Belgian soprano born in Brussels who has performed internationally and in major European opera houses. Specialising in contemporary music, she premiered works by composers such as Peter Eötvös, Stefan Prins, Bernard Foccroulle and Olga Neuwirth.

== Biography ==
=== Youth and education ===
Sarah Defrise is the daughter of two scientists and grew up in Watermael-Boitsfort in Brussels. She studied French literature at the Université libre de Bruxelles before joining the Royal Conservatory of Brussels (Dutch section) where she earned a Master of Music. She then went to study with Daniel Ottevaere at the École normale de musique de Paris where she earned a concertist diploma. In 2020, she earned a PhD in defending a these on melodies by Joseph Jongen at the Vrije Universiteit Brussel. She is a member of the Collegium of the Royal Academy of Science, Letters and Fine Arts of Belgium.

=== Career ===
Defrise made her debut in the role of Clorinda in La Cenerentola by Gioachino Rossini at the Opéra Royal de Wallonie in Liège in 2014. In 2017, she was designated young revelation at the Festival van Vlaanderen in Ghent and sang in duo with José Van Dam and the Symfonieorkest Vlaanderen under the direction of Jan Latham-Koenig. Her career developed in the direction of contemporary music and the premier roles in stage works by Peter Eötvös, Jean-Luc Fafchamps and Denis Bosse. In 2021, she sang Aventures et Nouvelles Aventures by György Ligeti for György Kurtág 95th birthday at the Budapest Music Center. She has sung on stages such as the Opéra Royal de Wallonie, Théâtre Royal de la Monnaie, Grand Théâtre de Genève, Staatsoper Unter den Linden, Nouvel opéra Fribourg, Opéra national de Lorraine, Théâtre de l'Athénée Louis-Jouvet, Müpa Budapest and Teatro Real in Madrid.

=== Competitions and Prizes ===
- 2022 : 2021 Young Musician of the Year, Prix Caecilia
- 2018 : Best performer Prize at International opera competition Armel in Budapest
- 2016 : Grand Prix musique contemporaine at Concours international Enesco in Paris
- 2013 : Bourse Nany Philippart
- 2012 : Prix jeune espoir féminin at Concours international de chant lyrique de Vivonne

== Principal roles ==
- 2026 : Monster's Paradise by Olga Neuwirth - Vampi, premiered at Hamburg State Opera
- 2024 : Paradise and the Peri by Robert Schumann - Theater an der Wien
- 2023 : Cassandra by Bernard Foccroulle - Naomi, premiered at Théâtre Royal de la Monnaie
- 2023 : Arabella by Richard Strauss, Christof Loy (stage direction) - Zdenka at Teatro Real in Madrid
- 2022 : Don Giovanni by Wolfgang Amadeus Mozart - Zerlina at Opéra Royal de Wallonie
- 2022 : Is This The End #2 by Jean-Luc Fafchamps – The Girl, premiered at Théâtre Royal de la Monnaie
- 2022 : Der goldene Drache by Peter Eötvös - Young woman / The little Chinese at Grand Théâtre de Genève
- 2021 : Sleepless by Peter Eötvös – The Girl, premiered at Staatsoper Unter den Linden in Berlin
- 2021 : Pelléas et Mélisande by Claude Debussy - Mélisande at Nouvel opéra Fribourg
- 2020 : Is This The End by Jean-Luc Fafchamps - The Girl, premiered at Théâtre Royal de la Monnaie
- 2019 : La Cenerentola by Gioachino Rossini - Clorinda at Opéra Royal de Wallonie
- 2019 : Candide by Leonard Bernstein - Cunégonde at Opéra Royal de Wallonie
- 2018 : Calamity Jane by Ben Johnston - Calamity Jane at Armel Festival in Budapest

== Discography ==
- 2023 : Fêtes Rouges, volume 2 of the complete melodies by Joseph Jongen with pianist Craig White for Musique en Wallonie
- 2021 : For Cathy, A Capella Album, A Tribute to Cathy Berberian with pieces by Cathy Berberian, Luciano Berio, Sylvano Bussotti, John Cage, Sarah Defrise and Henri Pousseur for Sub Rosa
- 2019 : Entrevisions, volume 1 of the complete melodies by Joseph Jongen with pianist Craig White for Musique en Wallonie
- 2019 : Un Requiem de Thierry Huillet

== Videos ==
- Aventures and Nouvelles Aventures by György Ligeti with UMZE Ensemble, for Kurtág 95 Meeting of Generations
- Coding Zero excerpt of Le Grand Macabre by György Ligeti with UMZE Ensemble conducted by Gregory Vajda, for Ligeti 100 Festival in Budapest
- Sequenza III by Luciano Berio and Stripsody by Cathy Berberian for Festival de Wallonie
- Coding Zero excerpt of Grand Macabre by György Ligeti with Stephane Ginsburgh, filmed by Patrick Leterme for Musiq'3
