= 2026 in classical music =

This article is for major events and other topics related to classical music in 2026.

== Events ==
- 1 January
  - At the 2026 Vienna New Year's Concert, the Vienna Philharmonic Orchestra and Yannick Nézet-Séguin perform the "Sirenen Lieder" of Josephine Amann-Weinlich and the "Rainbow Waltz" of Florence Price, in orchestrations by Wolfgang Dörner, the second time that the concert has featured music by female composers and the first time that the concert has featured more than one female composer. The inclusion of the Florence Price selection also marks the first appearance of music by a composer from outside Europe and by a composer of colour. The orchestra and conductor presented these works in the 30 December 2025 and 31 December 2025 performances of the same programme.
  - The Orchestre symphonique de Mulhouse officially takes national status in France, with the new name of the Orchestre national de Mulhouse.
- 6 January – The Opéra national de Paris announces the appointment of Semyon Bychkov as its next music director, effective 1 August 2028, with an initial contract of four years.
- 7 January
  - Aurora Orchestra announces that John Harte is to stand down as its chief executive in July 2026.
  - The London Symphony Orchestra announces the appointment of John Harte as its next managing director, effective in August 2026.
- 9 January – The board of directors of Washington National Opera votes to relocate from the Kennedy Center and to discontinue productions there.
- 12 January – The Orchestra of the Swan announces the appointment of Zoë Curnow as its next executive director, effective 1 April 2026.
- 13 January – The Park Avenue Armory announces the appointment of Deborah Warner as its artistic director, with immediate effect.
- 14 January – The Concertgebouw, Amsterdam announces Liam Nassereddine as the winner of its 'Concertgebouw Young Talent Award'.
- 15 January – An explosion in the city centre of Utrecht causes the evacuation of the Utrechts Conservatorium.
- 16 January – Washington National Opera announces the planned continuation of its spring 2026 season at George Washington University, following its 9 January decision to vacate the Kennedy Center.
- 20 January – The Metropolitan Opera announces cost-reduction plans to include staff redundancies and salary reductions, and the postponement of one new production originally scheduled for the 2026–2027 season.
- 21 January – The Ernst von Siemens Foundation announces its 2026 prizes:
  - 2026 Composer Prizes: Bethan Morgan-Williams, Hovik Sardaryan, Kitty Xiao
  - Ensemble Prizes '26: NO HAY BANDA, Ensemble for New Music Tallinn
  - 2026 Ernst von Siemens Music Prize: Jordi Savall
- 22 January
  - The Cliburn announces the inaugural Cliburn International Competition for Conductors, scheduled for 2028 in Houston.
  - The Allentown Symphony Orchestra announces that Diane Wittry is to retire as its music director at the close of the 2027–2028 season.
- 24 January – Denyce Graves gives the final performance of her career at the Metropolitan Opera, as Maria in Porgy and Bess.
- 27 January –
  - The George Enescu Philharmonic Orchestra announces the appointment of Robert Treviño as its next principal conductor, effective with the 2026–2027 season, with an initial contract of four years.
  - Ex Cathedra announces the appointment of James Burton as its next artistic director, effective with the 2027–2028 season.
  - Philip Glass announces the withdrawal of the world premiere of his Symphony No. 15 from its scheduled June 2026 performances at the Kennedy Center.
- 30 January – The Opernhaus Wuppertal announces the appointment of Christian Reif as its next Generalmusikdirektor, effective with the 2027–2028 season.
- 1 February – The closure of the John F. Kennedy Center for the Performing Arts for two years is announced, to take effect on 4 July 2026, ostensibly for renovation and reconstruction.
- 8 February – In the Super Bowl LX halftime show, a bespoke string orchestra performs an arrangement of Bad Bunny's song 'Monaco', under the direction of Giancarlo Guerrero.
- 9 February
  - The RAI National Symphony Orchestra announces the appointment of Michele Mariotti as its next principal conductor, the first Italian conductor to be named to the post, effective in October 2026, with an initial contract of three seasons.
  - Jeffrey Kahane resigns as music director of the San Antonio Philharmonic.
- 10 February
  - The Canadian Opera Company announces the appointment of Ian Derrer as its next general director, effective 1 July 2026.
  - News reports indicate that Ian Derrer is to conclude his tenure as general director and chief executive officer of Dallas Opera on 30 June 2026, in parallel with his appointment to the Canadian Opera Company.
- 11 February – The Nashville Symphony announces the appointment of Leonard Slatkin as its next music director, effective with the 2026–2027 season, with a set tenure through the 2028–2029 season.
- 12 February
  - The first public performance of the one-act opera Marina, with music by Umberto Giordano and libretto by Enrico Golisciani, takes place at the Teatro dal Verme, Milan, following the rediscovery of the opera after its disappearance for over 130 years.
  - The Los Angeles Chamber Orchestra announces that Jaime Martín is to conclude his tenure as its music director at the close of the 2026–2027 season.
- 16 February – The San Antonio Philharmonic announces the cancellation of the remaining concerts of its 2025-2026 season.
- 23 February – The Great Lakes Chamber Music Festival announces the appointment of Jennifer Frautschi as its next artistic director, effective with the 2027 season.
- 1 March - The Antwerp Symphony Orchestra officially merges with Opera Ballet Vlaanderen.
- 3 March
  - The London Philharmonic Orchestra simultaneously announces the scheduled conclusion of the tenure of Edward Gardner (conductor) as its principal conductor at the close of the 2027–2028 season, and the appointment of Paavo Järvi as its next chief conductor, effective with the 2028–2029 season.
  - The New World Symphony announces that Howard Herring is to retire as its president and chief executive officer effective 30 June 2026.
- 6 March
  - The board of directors and president of the Boston Symphony Orchestra announce that Andris Nelsons is to conclude his Boston Symphony Orchestra tenure at the end of the 2026–2027 season.
  - Jean Davidson announces her scheduled departure as executive director of the National Symphony Orchestra (Washington, DC, USA), effective in May 2026.
  - The Wallis Annenberg Center for the Performing Arts announces the appointment of Jean Davidson as its next executive director and chief executive officer, effective 4 May 2026.
- 9 March – Opera Australia announces the appointment of Amy Lane as its next director of opera, effective September 2026.
- 10 March
  - The Teatro dell'Opera di Roma announces the appointment of Alessandro Galoppini as its next artistic director, with an initial contract through 2030.
  - The board and foundation of La Fenice, with approval from Venice mayor Luigi Brugnaro, confirm the appointment of Beatrice Venezi as the next music director of La Fenice, without her ever having conducted a full production or concert with the company prior to her appointment, effective in October 2026.
  - The Boston Philharmonic Orchestra announces its plans to cease operations at the close of the 2026–2027 season.
- 12 March
  - The Senate of Berlin announces the appointment of Stefan Brandt as the new Generaldirektor (general director) of the Stiftung Oper in Berlin ('Berlin Opera Foundation'), effective 1 January 2027.
  - The Phoenix Symphony announces the appointment of Paolo Bortolameolli as its next music director, effective with the 2027–2028 season.
- 17 March – The Bergen Philharmonic Orchestra announces the appointment of Tabita Berglund as its next chief conductor, the first female conductor to be named to the post, effective with the 2027–2028 season, with an initial contract of four seasons.
- 18 March
  - Alina Pogostkina announces via social media her retirement from her concert career.
  - The Redlands Symphony announces the appointment of Deanna Tham as its next music director, the first female conductor to be named to the post, effective 1 July 2026.
- 19 March – The Brooklyn Academy of Music announces the appointment of Tamara McCaw as its new president, with immediate effect.
- 23 March – The Teatr Wielki – Polish National Opera announces the appointment of Yoel Gamzou as its next music director, effective with the 2026–2027 season, with an initial contract of four seasons.
- 26 March – The board of directors of the Salzburg Festival announce the termination of the contract of Markus Hinterhäuser as artistic director of the festival, placing him on leave until 30 September 2026.
- 1 April
  - The Staatsoper Hannover announces the appointment of Francesco Angelico as its next Generalmusikdirektor (GMD), effective with the 2026–2027 season.
  - The Hallé announces Aku Sorensen as the winner of the Siemens Hallé International Conductors Competition 2026.
- 2 April – The Bravo! Vail Music Festival announces the appointment of Chris Rogerson as its next artistic director, effective 1 September 2026.
- 6 April – The Ministry of Culture, Sports and Tourism of South Korea announces the following appointments, each with an initial term of three years:
  - The appointment of Han-na Chang as president of the Seoul Arts Center, the first woman to be named to the post, effective 24 April 2026
  - The appointment of Hye-jin Park as artistic director and chief executive of Korea National Opera
  - The appointment of Mee-jung Yoo as chief executive of the National Symphony Orchestra
- 7 April – The Salzburg Festival announces the appointment of Karin Bergmann as its interim artistic director, with immediate effect, the first woman to serve as the festival's artistic director.
- 9 April
  - Pekka Kuusisto announces via social media his suspension of his United States engagements in protest at the actions of the current US government.
  - The Buffalo Philharmonic Orchestra announces that Daniel Hart is to retire as its president and executive director on 31 December 2026.
- 16 April
  - English National Opera announces the appointment of Helen Shute as its next chief executive officer, effective November 2026.
  - The Groot Omroepkoor announces the appointment of Florian Helgath as its next chief conductor, effective with the 2027–2028 season, with an initial contract of four seasons.
- 23 April – The Metropolitan Opera announces that the government of Saudi Arabia has withdrawn from a previously discussed eight-year agreement intended to provide $200M USD to the company.
- 26 April – The board and foundation of La Fenice announce the annulment of the appointment of Beatrice Venezi as the opera company's next music director and the cancellation of all previously scheduled engagements with her as conductor, following public statements by Venezi seen as detrimental to the organisation.
- 30 April – Boston Baroque announces the appointment of Marc Minkowski as its next music director, effective with the 2026–2027 season.
- 1 May – The Adelaide Youth Orchestras announce the appointment of Lloyd Van't Hoff as its next artistic director, effective in June 2026.
- 5 May – Sinfonietta Rīga announces the appointment of Olari Elts as its next artistic director, effective with the 2026–2027 season.
- 8 May – The Handel and Haydn Society announces the appointment of Lecolion Washington, Jr. as its next president and chief executive officer, effective 1 August 2026.
- 9 May – The Cuarteto Latinoamericano gives its final performance as a string quartet at the Palacio de Bellas Artes in Mexico City.
- 12 May - The Royal Scottish National Orchestra announces simultaneously the scheduled conclusion of the tenure of Thomas Søndergård as its music director at the close of the 2025–2026 season, and the appointment of Giedrė Šlekytė as its next music director, the first female conductor ever named to the post, effective with the 2027–2028 season.
- 14 May – The Dallas Opera announces the appointment of David Lomelí as its general director and chief executive officer, effective with 1 June 2026.
- 21 May - The San Francisco Symphony announces the appointment of Elim Chan as its next music director, the first female conductor ever named to the post effective with the 2027–2028 season, with an initial contract of six years.
- 26 May –
  - Finnish National Opera and Ballet announces the appointment of Dima Slobodeniouk as its next principal conductor, with an initial contract of four years, from 1 August 2026 through 31 July 2030.
  - The Los Angeles Philharmonic announces the appointment of Daniel Harding as its next music director, effective with the 2027–2028 season.
- 27 May – The Seattle Symphony announces the appointment of Jeremy S. Rothman as its next president and chief executive officer, effective 1 September 2026.
- 1 June – The Deutsche Oper am Rhein announces the appointment of Evan Rogister as its next Generalmusikdirektor, effective with the 2027–2028 season.
- 2 June – The Munich Radio Orchestra announces the appointment of Leo Hussain as its next chief conductor, effective with the 2027–2028 season, with an initial contract of three years.
- 3 June – UK Culture Secretary Lisa Nandy announces the appointment of Dawn Airey as the new chair of Arts Council England, effective 1 August 2026, with an initial term of 4 years.
- 5 June – The Göttinger Symphonieorchester announces the appointment of Vilmantas Kaliunas as its next chief conductor and artistic adviser, effective with the 2027–2028 season.
- 8 June – The Orchestre de la Suisse Romande announces the appointment of Tugan Sokhiev as its next principal conductor and artistic adviser, effective with the 2026–2027 season, with an initial contract of three seasons.
- 10 June
  - The Bavarian State Opera announces the appointment of Petr Popelka as its next Generalmusikdirektor, effective with the 2029–2030 season, with an initial contract of five years.
  - The Aspen Music Festival and School announces the appointment of Meghan Martineau Umber as its next president and chief executive officer, the first woman to be named to the posts, effective 1 October 2026.{
- 12 June – The London Philharmonic Orchestra announces that David Burke is to stand down as its chief executive at the close of 2026.
- 16 June
  - The Tampere Philharmonic Orchestra announces the appointment of Kristian Sallinen as its next chief conductor and artistic director, effective with the 2027–2028 season, with an initial contract of three years.
  - The Rochester Philharmonic Orchestra announces the appointment of Tonya McBride Robles as its next president and chief executive officer, effective 17 August 2026.
- 17 June – Tours Opera announces the appointment of Marc Leroy-Calatayud as its inaugural music director, effective with the 2026–2027 season, with an initial contract of three years.
- 18 June – The Badisches Staatstheater Karlsruhe announces the appointment of Kerem Hasan as its next Generalmusikdirektor, effective with the 2027–2028 season.
- 19 June
  - Les Siècles announces the appointment of Antonello Manacorda as its next artistic director and music director, effective with the 2027–2028 season.
  - The Bibliothèque nationale de France announces the discovery of a 44-page notebook of music lessons administered to Marie-Louise-Philippine de Bonnières de Guînes by Wolfgang Amadeus Mozart, with annotations in Mozart's handwriting.
- 23 June
  - The BBC Scottish Symphony Orchestra simultaneously announces the scheduled conclusion of the tenure of Ryan Wigglesworth as its chief conductor at the close of the 2026–2027 season, and the appointment of Antony Hermus as its next chief conductor, effective in September 2027.
  - PIAS announces its acquisition of Signum Records.
- 10 July – In the lawsuit 'Gillham v Melbourne Symphony Orchestra Pty Ltd (Liability) [2026] FCA 891', the Federal Court of Australia rules in favour of the Melbourne Symphony Orchestra (MSO) and against Jayson Gillham, on the business grounds that Gillham was an independent contractor and not an MSO employee, and thus not protected under Australia's Fair Work Act.
- 14 July – The Louisville Orchestra announces the appointment of Jude Vaclavik as its next chief executive officer.
- 16 July
  - The Madison Symphony Orchestra announces the appointment of Laura Jackson as its next music director, the first female conductor to be named to the post, effective with the 2027–2028 season, with an initial contract of five seasons.
  - The Nashville Symphony announces the appointment of J. Mark Cantrell as its next president and chief executive officer, effective 1 August 2026.
- 26 July – The Colorado Music Festival announces the appointment of Aren Der Hacopian as its next executive director, effective 1 September 2026.
- 30 July – The Buffalo Philharmonic Orchestra announces the appointment of Jennifer Barbee as its next president and executive director, effective 1 September 2026.
- 3 August – The Grand Rapids Symphony announces the appointment of Agnieszka Rakhmatullaev as its next president and chief executive officer, effective 14 September 2026.
- 4 August The Casa da Música Foundation announces the appointment of Oscar Jockel as its new conductor-in-residence and as the next principal conductor of the Remix Ensemble, effective January 2027.
- 5 August
  - At the Sankt Burchardi Kirche (St. Burchardi Church), Halberstadt, the newest chord change in the planned 639-year performance of John Cage's Organ2/ASLSP (As Slow as Possible) takes place, with the addition of an A4, the first chord change since 5 February 2024.
  - The Orcas Island Chamber Music Festival simultaneously announces the scheduled conclusion of the tenure of Aloysia Friedmann as its artistic director at the close of its 2027 summer season, and the appointment of Joshua Gindele as its next artistic director, effective with its 2028 summer season.
- 10 August
  - The Landesjugendsinfonieorchester Hessen announces the appointment of Leslie Suganandarajah as its next chief conductor, with immediate effect.
  - The Los Angeles Chamber Orchestra announces the appointment of Matthias Pintscher as its next music director, effective with the 2027–2028 season, with an initial contract of four years.
- 12 August – Juanjo Mena conducts the final concert of his career at the Teatro Victoria Eugenia in San Sebastián, with the Euskadiko Orkestra.
- 3 September – Chandos Records announces its acquisition of Bridge Records.
- 4 September – The city of Düsseldorf and the Deutsche Oper am Rhein announce the presence of structural deficiencies in the stage tower above the proscenium arch of the Opernhaus Düsseldorf, and the corresponding cancellation of the season-opening events of 13 September 2026 and of a minimum of eight company performances.
- 8 September – The Boston Symphony Orchestra announces the appointment of Jean-Sébastien Vallée as director of its choruses and conductor of the Tanglewood Festival Chorus.
- 9 September
  - Opera North announces simultaneously the scheduled conclusion of the tenure of Garry Walker as its music director at the close of the 2027–2028 season, and the appointment of Patrick Lange as its next music director, effective with the 2028–2029 season.
  - A news report in El Correo indicates that Juanjo Mena has formally retired from his conducting career, as a result of rapid development of his previously announced condition of Alzheimer's Disease.
- 12 September – The musicians of the San Francisco Opera orchestra take industrial action, causing the cancellation of the company's opening night performance, after the prior expiration of the orchestra's union contract on 31 July 2026.
- 15 September – The Manhattan School of Music announces that James Gandre is to retire as its president in June 2028.
- 17 September – The Philharmonia Orchestra announces simultaneously the scheduled conclusion of the tenure of Santtu-Matias Rouvali as its principal conductor at the close of the 2027–2028 season, and the appointment of Manfred Honeck as its next principal conductor, effective with the start of the 2028–2029 season.
- 18 September
  - The Lahti Symphony Orchestra announces the appointment of Nil Venditti as its next chief conductor, effective with the 2027–2028 season, with an initial contract of three seasons.
  - The management and orchestra musicians of San Francisco Opera agree to a new four-year contract, ending the industrial action taken by the orchestra musicians on Saturday 12 September 2026.
- 25 September
  - The Queensland Symphony Orchestra announces that Umberto Clerici is to stand down as its chief conductor at the end of 2027.
  - The musicians of The Cleveland Orchestra take industrial action, following the extended expiration date of 23 September 2026 of the musicians' prior contract with Local 4 of the American Federation of Musicians of the United States and Canada, after subsequent deadlocked negotiations over salary.
  - Mark Swed retires as classical music critic of the Los Angeles Times.
- 27 September – The musicians and the management of The Cleveland Orchestra agree to a new three-year contract, ending the industrial action initiated by the orchestra musicians on Friday 25 September 2026.
- 28 September – The Nashville Symphony announces the planned suspension of its 2026-2027 season, effective 18 October 2026, with plans to furlough 27 staff members and all 77 orchestra musicians, citing a state of 'financial emergency' at the orchestra.
- 29 September
  - The Norwegian Arctic Philharmonic Orchestra announces the appointment of Jakub Przybycień as its next chief conductor, effective with the 2027–2028 season, with an initial contract of three years.
  - The Nashville Symphony announces the departure of J. Mark Cantrell as its president and chief executive officer, and the appointment of Mark Cantrell as its new president and chief executive officer, both with immediate effect.
- 4 October – The Nashville Symphony announces a donation from the Oracle Corporation of USD $10M to the orchestra, allowing the orchestra to reverse its previously announced plans to furlough staff and musicians and to resume the 2026-2027 season.
- 17 October – The Shanghai Grand Opera House officially opens to the public.
- 20 October – The Phoenix Symphony announces the suspension of its 2026-2027 season, effective 2 November 2026, citing a lack of sufficient financial resources.

== New works ==
- Ondrej Adámek – Thin Ice (Violin Concerto No. 2)
- Samuel Adams – Violin Concerto No. 2 (The Wheel)
- Andrew Aronowicz – The Erl-King
- Noriko Baba – Bestiarium Musicale VI
- Natasha Barrett – The Disenchanted Tranquility of the Kingdom
- Katia Beaugeais – Bells of Time
- Luke Bedford – Where the Lines Cross
- Birke J. Bertelsmeier – JUX TAP O SIT IO
- Dániel Péter Biró – Hagirot
- JaRon Brown – and this too, shall pass
- Anne Cawrse – The King Walks in the Orangerie
- Eun-Hwa Cho – Preludes: II. 'Shared Destinies'
- Amelia Clarkson – Three Girls in an August Garden
- Ann Cleare – Dream Machine
- Tristan Coelho – Harp Concerto
- Robert Davidson – Isolation
- Tansy Davies – The Passion of Mary Magdalene
- Brett Dean (music) and Carol Ann Duffy (texts) – The World's Wife
- Jakob Diehl – Bruchstück
- Robert Dillon – Scoundrel
- Philip Dutton – There, where I call home
- Melody Eötvös – Regnare (piano trio)
- Karmit Fadael – My memories are louder than your missiles
- Farzia Fallah – of asphyxia
- Edmund Finnis – The Landscape Wakes
- Cheryl Frances-Hoad (music) and Di Sherlock (text) – Five Beacons of Light
- Bianca Gannon – And Then There Was One
- Gavin Higgins – Clarinet Concerto
- Clara Iannotta – into a world that is pure blue (where you are transformed utterly and forever) ((Amen))
- Sophia Jani – Concerto for Violin and Orchestra
- Gabriel Jenks – On the Run (mandolin concerto)
- Nathalie Joachim – M anvi chante peyi m
- Hermann Keller – Verwandlungen
- Hannah Kendall – the unfleshed bells of the inaudible
- Golfam Khayam – Seven Valleys of Love
- Sunny Kim and Hilary Kleinig – Pu:m 품 (Holding)
- Texu Kim – Dis/Connection
- Hilary Kleinig – Hear Me Now
- Hanna Kulenty – Negende verdieping
- György Kurtág (music) and Christoph Hein (libretto, after letters of Georg Christoph Lichtenberg) – Die Stechardin
- David Lang – the wealth of nations
- Mauro Lanza – we've actually been in this place before
- James Ledger – Clarinet Concerto
- Tania Léon – Imágenes Mestizas
- Fabien Lévy – Que reste-t-il? - Hindewhu Extinction
- George E. Lewis
  - Broke
  - ...Ohne Festen Wohnsitz
- Lei Liang – Rain Under the Sea
- Lowell Liebermann – Piano Sonata No. 4
- Ricardo Lorenz – Humboldt's Nature
- Wynton Marsalis – Symphony No. 5 ('Liberty')
- Colin Matthews – Oboe Concerto
- Paul Mealor (music) and Grahame Davies - Aberfan: From Darkness to Light
- Thomas Misson – Cicerone Suite
- Kate Moore – Storm Oratory (Percussion Concerto)
- Belenish Moreno-Gil and Oscar Escudero – NO HERE
- Bethan Morgan-Williams – Digon!
- Jacob Mühlrad – Helix
- Brigitta Muntendorf – Last Show
- Olga Neuwirth – Zones of Blue (clarinet concerto)
- David Önaç – Atlantic Requiem
- Wayne Oquin – On the Words of Walt Whitman (texts by Walt Whitman)
- Jane O'Leary – Silence
- Joseph Phibbs – Cello Concerto
- Stefan Prins – Madness Machines
- Deborah Pritchard – Light Circle
- Éliane Radigue – OCCAM XXV zeta
- Marina Rosenfeld – XY
- Rebecca Saunders – thirst
- Emily Sheppard – 'May these sounds bring you home'
- Igor C Silva – Tomorrow’s Next Bliss
- Mark Simpson – Piano Concerto
- Tyshawn Sorey – For Marilyn Crispell (for piano and orchestra)
- Josephine Stephenson – 'That the sunrise not leave us unmoved' (texts by Emily Dickinson)
- Shirley J. Thompson – Seventh Sense: Incidents in the Life of Queen Amanirenas
- Alex Turley – Forest, Ocean, City
- Ivan Vukosavljević – Dead in Love
- Daniel Wohl – Lighthouse
- Cooper Wood – CEASE[less]
- Sam Wu – Forest, Ocean, City
- Annija Anna Zarina – Bloom
- Sauli Zinovjev – Taste of Metal (Symphony No. 1)

== New operas ==
- Amen Feizabadi and Dilek Mayatürk – Deep Siesta
- Dai Fujikura and Harry Ross – The Great Wave
- Elena Langer and Arkady Zastyrets – To Die For (A Comedy)
- Missy Mazzoli and Royce Vavrek
  - The Galloping Cure
  - Lincoln in the Bardo
- Olga Neuwirth and Elfriede Jelinek – Monster's Paradise
- Marko Nikodijević and Silvia Costa – I Didn't Know Where To Put All My Tears
- Karola Obermüller and Peter Gilbert – Malina
- George Palmer and Leah Purcell – The Drover's Wife
- Matthias Pintscher and Daniel Arkadij Gerzenberg – Das kalte Hertz
- Nicola Piovani and Giancarlo De Cataldo – Romanzo Criminale
- Zach Redler (music), Kelley Rourke and Matt Ross (libretto) – A River Runs Through It
- Jorge Sosa and John de los Santos – Ofrenda
- Andrea Tarrodi and Helena Röhr – Homo Oeconomicus
- Michel van der Aa – Theory of Flames
- Param Vir and David Rudkin – Awakening

== Recordings ==
- Charles-Valentin Alkan – 'The Complete Alkan Organ Works, Vol 1'
- Johann Ludwig Bach – The Leipzig Cantatas (first recordings)
- Nadia Boulanger and Raoul Pugno – La ville morte (first recording)
- Havergal Brian – Symphony No. 1 ('The Gothic') (first commercial release of the fourth live performance of the complete work, 25 May 1980 at the Royal Albert Hall)
- Unsuk Chin – Goulagon / Double Concerto for Piano, Percussion and Ensemble / Graffiti
- Sara Davachi – The Will of Tongues
- Anthony Davis and Richard Wesley – The Central Park Five (first recording)
- Umberto Giordano and Enrico Golisciani – Marina (first recording)
- HK Gruber – Short Stories from the Vienna Woods / Luftschlösser
- Anders Hillborg – Lost Landscapes
- Sir Anthony Hopkins – Life Is A Dream (first recordings)
- Robert Laidlow – Reality Eaters
- David Lang – 'the sense of senses' (first recording)
- Missy Mazzoli and Royce Vavrek – Breaking the Waves (first recording)
- Gabriela Ortiz – Yanga, Dzonot (first recordings), Seis Piezas a Violeta
- Curtis Stewart - '24 American Caprices'
- Huw Watkins – Concerto for Orchestra / Fanfare for the Hallé / Symphony No. 2 (first recordings)

== Deaths ==
- 1 January – Wolfgang Herzfeld, German orchestral violinist, 88
- 2 January
  - Ritva Auvinen, Finnish opera singer, 93
  - Lajos Rovátkay, Hungary-born harpsichordist and musicologist resident in Germany, 92
- 3 January – Mesut İktu, Turkish baritone and pedagogue, 78
- 5 January – Andrew Carter, British choral composer and pedagogue, 86
- 6 January – Rhoda Levine, American opera director, 93
- 7 January – Ihor Blazhkov, Ukrainian conductor, 89
- 11 January
  - Andrew Clements, British music critic, 75
  - John Wallace, British trumpeter, composer and arts educator, 75
- 22 January – Peter Hanser-Strecker, German music publisher, 83
- 23 January – Earl Carlyss, American violinist and pedagogue, 86
- 24 January
  - Kazuhito Yamashita, Japanese guitarist, 64
  - Hilde Limondjian, American concert impresario of Armenian ancestry born in Turkey, 89
- 25 January – Jeroen Bal, Dutch orchestral pianist, 52
- 2 February – Niek Wijns, Dutch clarinetist, 69
- 5 February – Tamás Vásáry, Hungarian pianist and conductor, 92
- 10 February – Uwe Dierksen, German trombonist, 66
- 11 February – Helmuth Rilling, German conductor, 92
- 16 February – Robin Stevens, British composer and cellist, 67
- 17 February – José van Dam, Belgian bass-baritone, 85
- 24 February – Éliane Radigue, French composer, 94
- 25 February – Roman Kofman, Ukrainian conductor, 89
- 3 March
  - Gustav Gunsenheimer, German composer, choral conductor and pedagogue, 91
  - Zsolt Kerestely, Romanian-Hungarian composer and conductor, 91
- 4 March – Bernard Rands, British composer resident in the United States, 92
- 5 March – Mihail Vasilievich Secichin, Moldovan pianist and conductor, 82
- 6 March – Franco Vito Gaiezza, Italian harpsichordist, organist, pianist, actor, composer, and writer, 63
- 17 March – Robert White, American tenor, 89
- 23 March – Sylvia Kersenbaum, Argentina-born pianist and pedagogue resident in the USA, 84
- 25 March – Alexander Murray, British orchestral flautist and pedagogue resident in the USA, 96
- 1 April - Barbro Ericson, Swedish mezzo soprano, 96
- 11 April – Ilse von Alpenheim, Austrian pianist, 99
- 13 April – Cees Dam, Dutch architect (Stopera), 93
- 14 April – Pierre Strosser, French opera director, 82
- 15 April
  - Witiko Adler, German concert impresario, 97
  - Osvaldas Balakauskas, Lithuanian composer and diplomat, 88
- 16 April
  - Oleg Maisenberg, Russian pianist resident in Austria, 80
  - Ann Schein Carlyss, American pianist and pedagogue, 86
- 17 April – Michael Harrison, American composer, 67
- 19 April
  - Gerhard Schmidt-Gaben, German choral conductor and founder of the Tölzer Knabenchor, 88
  - Andrew Thomas, American composer, pianist, conductor, and pedagogue, 86
- 20 April
  - Kyriakos Sfetsas, Greek composer, 80
  - Sergei Stadler, Russian violinist, conductor, and pedagogue, 63
- 22 April
  - Ruth Slenczynska, American pianist and pedagogue, 101
  - Michael Tilson Thomas, American conductor and composer, 81
- 23 April – Jean-Bernard Pommier, French pianist and conductor, 81
- 24 April – Günter Pichler, Austrian violinist and founding member of the Alban Berg Quartett, 86
- 27 April – Mimi Coertse, South African soprano, 97
- 30 April – Seymour Bernstein, American pianist, composer, and pedagogue, 99
- 1 May – Michael Sollis, Australian composer, 40
- 2 May – Michel Debost, French flautist, 92
- 5 May – Pavel Hunka, Ukrainian baritone resident in the UK, 67
- 6 May – Manuela Hoelterhoff, American opera critic and author, 77
- 7 May – Günter Jena, German choral conductor, musicologist, and organist, 93
- 17 May – Dame Felicity Lott, British soprano, 79
- 19 May – Limmie Pulliam, American tenor, 50
- 22 May – Carl Schachter, American music theorist and pedagogue, 93
- 23 May – Brian Large, British television director of opera and concert programmes and author, 89
- 24 May – Betty Roe, British composer, 90 (death reported on this date)
- 25 May – Samuel Magad, American orchestra concertmaster (leader) and community orchestra conductor, 94
- 26 May – Arnold Whittall, British musicologist, 90
- 30 May – Speight Jenkins, American opera house administrator and prior music critic, 89
- 6 June – Ute Walther, German mezzo-soprano, 83
- 9 June
  - Ruth Watson Henderson, Canadian composer and pianist, 93
  - Bruno Turner, British choral conductor, musicologist, publisher, and broadcaster, 95
- 10 June – Jan Málek, Czech composer and music administrator, 88
- 11 June – Hans Gerd Klais, German organ builder, 95
- 13 June – Annick Chartreux, French composer, pianist and pedagogue, 83
- 19 June – Désiré N'Kaoua, French pianist, 93
- 23 June – Erie Mills, American soprano, opera administrator and pedagogue, 73
- 24 June – Veronica Jochum von Moltke, German-born pianist and pedagogue based in the USA, 93
- 28 June – Mignon Dunn, American mezzo-soprano, 98
- 4 July – Lothar Voigtländer, German composer, 82
- 8 July
  - Jesper Bøje Christensen, Danish harpsichordist, musicologist and teacher, 81
  - Martin Matoušek, Czech baritone, 53
- 11 July – Robert Cole, American music administrator and impresario, 95
- 13 July – Pedro Ignacio Calderón, Argentinian conductor, 92
- 18 July
  - Chen Gang, Chinese composer, 91
  - Robert Wiremu, New Zealand baritone, choral conductor, composer and arranger, pedagogue, and pianist, 55
- 21 July – Bill McLaughlin, American conductor, composer and radio presenter, 82
- 26 July – Joel Cohen, American lutenist, conductor, composer and musicologist, 84
- 28 July – Vassil Kazandjiev, Bulgarian composer, conductor and pedagogue, 91
- 4 August – Bruno Campanella, Italian conductor, 83
- 5 August – Bruno Battisti D'Amario, Italian guitarist, composer, and pedagogue, 88
- 11 August
  - Jill Gomez (Jill Carnegy, Countess of Northesk), Trinidad-born British soprano, 82
  - 11 August – Henryk P. Kowalski, Poland-born violinist and pedagogue active in the USA, 78
- 17 August – Harry van der Kamp, Dutch bass and vocal ensemble leader, 79
- 18 August
  - Joaquín Clemente Riera, Spanish orchestral double bassist active in The Netherlands, 44
  - Asadour Santourian, Lebanon-born American arts administrator, 68
- 19 August – Tudor Chiriac, Moldovan composer, musicologist and pedagogue, 87
- 20 August – Ileana Cotrubas, Romanian soprano, 87
- 24 August – MariAnne Häggander, Swedish soprano, 74
- 30 September – John Bröcheler, Dutch baritone, 81
- 13 October – Martina Arroyo, American soprano, 90
- 23 October – Judith Blegen, American soprano, 85
- 27 October – Stephen Kovacevich, American-born pianist resident in the UK, 85

== Major awards ==
- 2026 Pulitzer Prize for Music: Gabriela Lena Frank – Picaflor: A Future Myth

=== 2026 Musical America Award Winners ===
- Artist of the Year: Emanuel Ax
- Composer of the Year: Gabriela Lena Frank
- Conductor of the Year: Jakub Hrůša
- Vocalist of the Year: Gerald Finley
- Impresario of the Year: Martha Gilmer

=== 2026 Grammy Awards ===
- Best Chamber Music/Small Ensemble Performance: Donnacha Dennehy – Land of Winter; Alarm Will Sound (Nonesuch)
- Best Choral Performance: Gabriela Ortiz – Yanga; Los Angeles Philharmonic, Tambuco Percussion Ensemble, Los Angeles Master Chorale; Grant Gershon, chorus master; Gustavo Dudamel, conductor (Platoon)
- Best Classical Compendium: Gabriela Ortiz – Yanga, Los Angeles Philharmonic,Tambuco Percussion Ensemble, Los Angeles Master Chorale; Grant Gershon, chorus master; Gustavo Dudamel, conductor (Platoon)
- Best Classical Instrumental Solo: Shostakovich – The Cello Concertos; Yo-Yo Ma; Boston Symphony Orchestra; Andris Nelsons, conductor (Deutsche Grammophon)
- Best Classical Solo Vocal Album: Telemann: Ino - Opera Arias For Soprano; Boston Early Music Festival Orchestra; Amanda Forsythe, soprano; Robert Mealy, Paul O'Dette, and Stephen Stubbs, conductors (CPO)
- Best Contemporary Classical Composition: Gabriela Ortiz – Dzonot
- Best Opera Recording: Jake Heggie and Gene Scheer – Intelligence; Janai Brugger, J'Nai Bridges, Jamie Barton, Caitlin Lynch, Michael Mayes, Nicholas Newton, Joshua Blue; Houston Grand Opera Orchestra; Kwamé Ryan, conductor; Blanton Alspaugh, producer (Houston Grand Opera)
- Best Engineered Album, Classical: Bruckner – Symphony No. 7 / Mason Bates – Resurrexit; Pittsburgh Symphony Orchestra; Manfred Honeck, conductor; Mark Donahue and John Newton, engineers; Mark Donahue, mastering engineer (Reference Recordings)
- Best Orchestral Performance: Olivier Messiaen – Turangalîla-Symphonie; Yuja Wang, piano; Cécile Lartigau, ondes martenot; Boston Symphony Orchestra; Andris Nelsons, conductor (Deutsche Grammophon)

=== 2026 Royal Philharmonic Society Awards ===
- Chamber-Scale Composition: Claudia Molitor – Fever
- Conductor: John Wilson
- Ensemble: Royal Scottish National Orchestra
- Gamechanger: Jacob Collier
- Impact: Orchestras for All
- Inspiration: Kirkcaldy Orchestral Society
- Instrumentalist: Peter Moore (trombone)
- Large-Scale Composition: Mark-Anthony Turnage – Festen (libretto by Lee Hall)
- Opera and Music Theatre: Uprising – Glyndebourne
- Series and Events: 'Multitudes' – Southbank Centre
- Singer: Louise Alder (soprano)
- Storytelling: 'Everything We Do Is Music' – Elizabeth Alker
- Young Artist: Matilda Lloyd (trumpet)

=== Gramophone Classical Music Awards 2026 ===
- Chamber: Bohuslav Martinů – String Quartets Nos. 2, 3, 5, 7; Pavel Haas Quartet (Supraphon)
- Choral: Johann Ludwig Bach - The Leipzig Cantatas; Sebastian Myrus, Richard Resch, William Shelton, Flore Van Meerssche, Carine Tinney, Michael Mogl, Tabea Mitterbauer, Anna-Lena Elbert, Micha Matthäus, Tobias Knaus; Capella Sollertia, Johanna Soller (Ricercar)
- Concerto: Ligeti - Violin Concerto, Concert Românesc, Piano Concerto; Isabelle Faust, Martial Gauthier, Carole Roth, Robin Michael, Jean-Frédéric Neuburger; Les Siècles, François-Xavier Roth (harmonia mundi)
- Contemporary: Huw Watkins – Fanfare, Symphony No. 2, Concerto For Orchestra; Hallé Orchestra, Sir Mark Elder (Hallé)
- Early Music: Stravagante pensiero: Gesualdo & Napoli; Concerto Italiano, Rinaldo Alessandrini (Naive)
- Instrumental: Louis Couperin: The Complete Works; Jean Rondeau (Erato)
- Opera: Kaija Saariaho and Amin Maalouf: Adriana Mater; Fleur Barron, Axelle Fanyo, Nicholas Phan, Christopher Purves; San Francisco Symphony and San Francisco Symphony Chorus, Esa-Pekka Salonen (Deutsche Grammophon)
- Orchestral: Grażyna Bacewicz: Orchestral Works, Vol. 2 - Symphony No. 2, Piano Concerto, Concerto For Large Symphony Orchestra; Peter Donohoe, BBC Symphony Orchestra, Sakari Oramo (Chandos)
- Piano: Schubert 4 Hands – Bertrand Chamayou, Leif Ove Andsnes (Erato)
- Song: Belle époque! – Adèle Charvet, Florian Caroubi (Alpha)
- Voice and Ensemble: Gluck Arias – Ann Hallenberg, The Mozartists, Ian Page (Signum Classics)
- Recording of the Year: Louis Couperin: The Complete Works; Jean Rondeau (Erato)
- Lifetime Achievement: Dame Imogen Cooper
- Label of the Year: Erato
- Young Artist of the Year: Alexander Malofeev
- Artist of the Year: Isabelle Faust
- Orchestra of the Year: Bamberg Symphony
