= Robert Laidlow =

British composer (born 1994)

Robert Laidlow (born 1994) is a British composer. He collaborates with scientists and applies advanced technology in his compositions.

== Career ==
In 2018, Laidlow was appointed the Royal Northern College of Music Doctoral Researcher in AI and Composition in association with the BBC Philharmonic and the Centre for Practice & Research in Science & Music (PRiSM).

In 2019 Laidlow's music was featured twice at the Barbican Centre's 'More than Human' and 'Life Rewired' seasons, which explored artistic responses to technology. His piece Turing Test // Prelude, a musical game for the audience based on the prelude from J. S. Bach's Suite in D major, was first performed by Mahan Esfahani for the Barbican event 'The Eternal Golden Braid' and later televised in the Royal Institution's 2019 Christmas Lectures. His piece Alter was premiered by the Britten Sinfonia at the Barbican event 'Ada Lovelace: Imagining the Analytical Engine', curated by Emily Howard.

Laidlow's first string quartet, Aroha, premiered at the Wigmore Hall in May 2019, performed by the Elias Quartet, and was shortlisted for a 2020 Ivor Novello award. His second string quartet, Gravity (2021), was commissioned by the Echea Quartet.

In 2019 Laidlow was awarded a Royal Philharmonic Society Composers Prize, which resulted in a commission for the Royal Liverpool Philharmonic. The commissioned piece Chromodynamics premiered in October 2021, having been delayed due to the COVID-19 pandemic, conducted by Robert Ames. Also in 2021 his piano concerto Warp, which was commissioned by the BBC Philharmonic, was performed and broadcast on BBC Radio 3, with soloist Joseph Havlat and conductor Vimbayi Kaziboni. Warp was awarded the 2022 Ivan Juritz Prize for Modernism, described in the journal Textual Practice as "combining masterful orchestration with sensitive and varied writing for the soloist".

In October 2022, Laidlow's symphony for orchestra and artificial intelligence, Silicon, premiered at the Bridgewater Hall, performed by the BBC Philharmonic and conducted by Vimbayi Kaziboni. The piece was received positively, described as 'a fabulously inventive and gigantically imaginative AI symphony that isn't in thrall to the technology but uses it instead as a tool for human creativity' (The Listening Service) with a focus on the 'variousness and multiplicity of human music-making' (Bachtrack). Silicon received widespread press coverage across scientific and artistic publications, including features in the New York Times, the New Scientist and BBC Music Magazine. The first performance was broadcast on BBC Radio 3 and on RTVE Television, with a subsequent performance by the RTÉ Concert Orchestra, conducted by David Brophy, broadcast on RTÉ One. The third movement of Silicon was selected as the runner-up for the 2023 Royal Musical Association Tippett Medal, which described the movement as a "beautifully crafted orchestral work that embodies the spirit of compositional innovation".

He is a member of the Department of Music at King's College London and an associate of PRiSM. He was previously a fellow at Jesus College, Oxford University.

== Biography ==
Laidlow grew up in Bromley, south-east London. His mother is the Olympic athlete Simone Laidlow. He read music as an undergraduate at Emmanuel College, Cambridge University, before studying composition at the Royal Academy of Music with David Sawer.
