= Raoul Pugno =

French composer, teacher, organist, and pianist

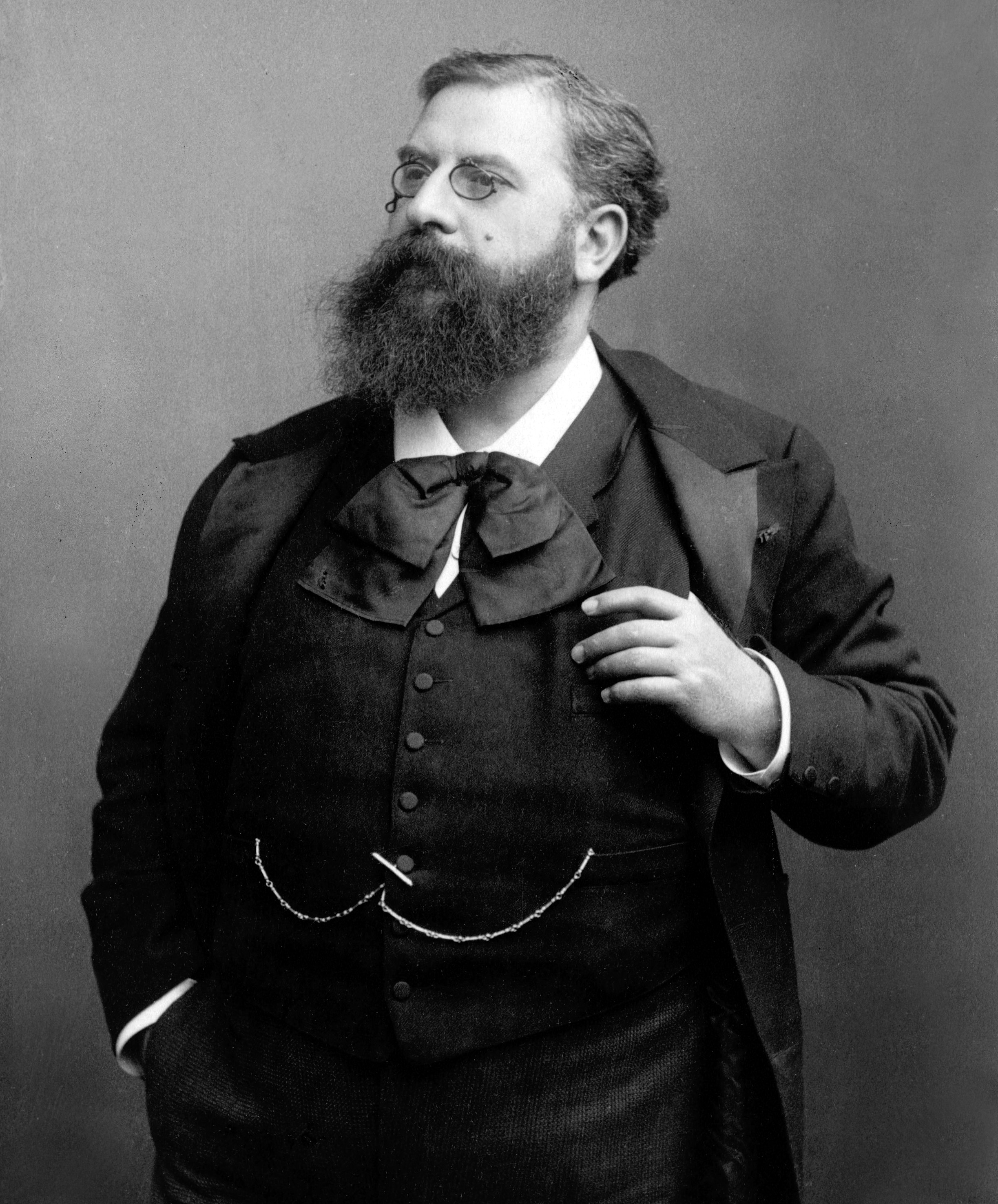
Raoul Pugno in 1897

Stéphane Raoul Pugno (23 June 1852 – 3 January 1914 [O.S. 21 December 1913]) was a French composer, teacher, organist, and pianist known for his playing of Mozart's works.

== Biography ==
Raoul Pugno was born in Paris and was of Italian origin. He made his debut at the age of six, and with the help of Prince Poniatowski he was then able to study at the École Niedermeyer. He then went to the Paris Conservatoire at age 14, where he shone. He won First Prize in Piano in 1866 (his teacher being Georges Mathias, a pupil of Frédéric Chopin), First Prize in Harmony and First Medal for solfège in 1867 (his composition teacher being Ambroise Thomas), and First Prize in Organ in 1869 (his teacher was François Benoist). He was appointed Director of Music at the Opéra by the Paris Commune of March–May 1871. At the grand re-opening of the Opéra, two of his works were performed.

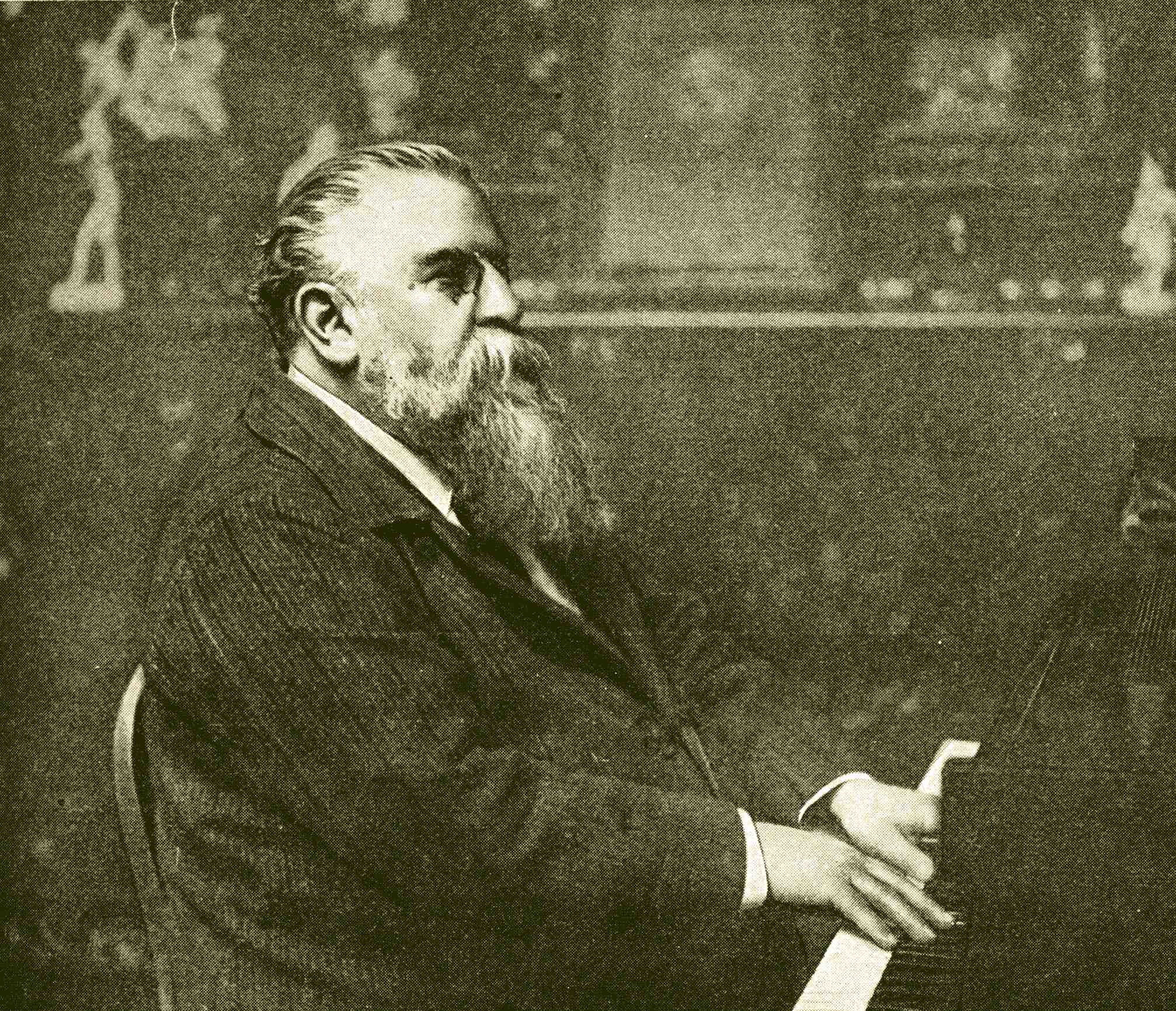
Raoul Pugno at the piano

He was organist at the Church of Saint-Eugène, 1872–92, chorus master at the Théâtre Ventador in 1874, and Professor of Harmony at the Conservatoire 1892–96 and Professor of Piano 1896–1901.

He remained a pedagogue until 1893, when he was over 40. One of his notable pupils was Léo-Pol Morin. He then decided to resume his career as a concert pianist, commencing with the Piano Concerto in A minor by Edvard Grieg. At a small-scale performance of Richard Wagner's Das Rheingold in 1893, Pugno and Claude Debussy provided an accompaniment on two pianos. He had a brilliant career, travelling throughout Europe and to the United States, where American composer Marion Bauer acted as guide and translator for Pugno and his family.

His specialty was the solo piano works and piano concertos of Wolfgang Amadeus Mozart. Pugno was also a fine interpreter of the piano works of Chopin and César Franck. He was also renowned for his appearances with the violinist Eugène Ysaÿe, with whom he worked from 1896, giving performances of works by Gabriel Fauré, Camille Saint-Saëns, and Ernest Chausson. The duo also gave the premiere performances of violin sonatas by Albéric Magnard and Louis Vierne. He also appeared with the violinist Leopold Auer.

He spent his summers at his home in Gargenville where he taught and entertained, often playing concertos and works for two pianos with Saint-Saëns and the young Nadia Boulanger. He died in 1914 in Moscow, while on a concert tour of Russia. His compositions are no longer in the repertoire, but his legacy lives on through his students.

== Selected works ==
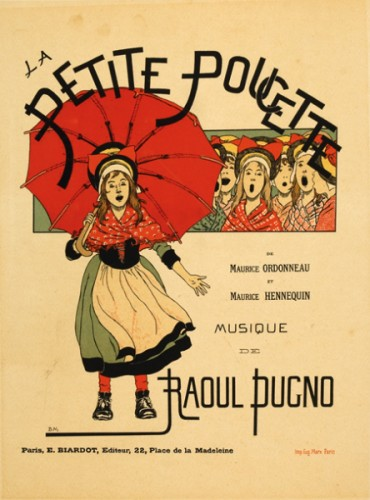
Poster for the operetta La Petite Poucette, by Louis-Maurice Boutet de Monvel, from Les Maitres de l'Affiche series, printed by Eugene Marx, Paris, c. 1891

- La Resurrection de Lazare, oratorio (1879)
- La Fée Cocotte, féerie
- Les Papillons, ballet (London, 1881)
- Ninetta, opéra-comique (1882)
- Le Sosie, opéra-bouffe (1887)
- Le Valet de coeur, opéra-comique (1888)
- Le Retour d'Ulysse, opera (1889)
- La Vocation de Marius, opera (1890)
- La Petite Poucette, opera (1891)
- Melusine, opera
- La Danseuse de corde, pantomime (1892)
- Pour le drapeau, mimodrame (1895)
- Le Chevalier aux fleurs, Ballet (1897, with André Messager)
- La ville morte (Gabriele d'Annunzio), opera, with Nadia Boulanger
- songs
- piano pieces

=== Recordings ===
Pugno was the first internationally renowned pianist to make recordings. In 1903 he recorded pieces by George Frideric Handel, Domenico Scarlatti and Chopin and one of his own compositions, an Impromptu Valse. In a Chopin waltz, Pugno displays his famous jeu de perle technique. His other Chopin recordings include the Impromptu in A flat, Op. 29, Berceuse, Op. 57, Waltz in A flat, Op. 34 No. 1, and the Marche funèbre from the Sonata in B flat minor. Pugno's most important recording however, is that of Chopin's Nocturne in F sharp, Op. 15, No. 2, in which he plays the piece noticeably slower than the norm, a practice bequeathed to him by his teacher Georges Mathias, himself a student of Chopin. His most extended recording is that of Franz Liszt's Hungarian Rhapsody No. 11. It is impetuous and exciting, and has Pugno pushing himself to the extremes of his abilities without any loss of control.

- Legendary Piano Recordings: The Complete Grieg, Saint-Saëns, Pugno, and Diémer (Marston Records)
- Chopin's Nocturne in F sharp, Op. 15, No. 2 on YouTube (the sound is distorted because the record was cut on a defective turntable with fluctuating speed).

== Sources ==
- Grove V (1961)
- Naxos biography
