= La Ville morte =

Opera by Nadia Boulanger and Raoul Pugno

- by Nadia Boulanger and Raoul Pugno
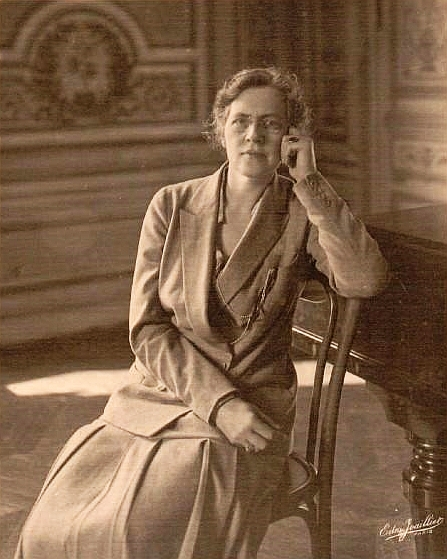
- Boulanger in 1925
- Language: French
- Based on: Gabriele D'Annunzio's play La città morta
- Premiere: 2005; Siena

La Ville morte is an opera by Nadia Boulanger and Raoul Pugno to the text of Gabriele D'Annunzio's play La città morta. It has been called Boulanger's "most significant achievement as a creative artist".

== History ==
After hearing her examinations at the Conservatoire de Paris in 1904, Pugno became Boulanger's teacher, collaborator and promotor. Some writers say that Pugno and Boulanger became lovers, while others do not. In 1909 they wrote a song cycle, Les heures claires, together. Work on the opera probably began in 1909 and was finished in 1912. Pugno died on 3 January 1914, before the opera could have its premiere. Opéra-Comique had finished casting by July 1914, and choir rehearsals were scheduled to start on 17 August that same year when the outbreak of World War I disrupted all plans. With many echoes of Pelléas et Mélisande, the story follows the lives and loves of an archeologist, Léonard, his sister Hebé, Alexandre, a colleague, and his wife Anne, amidst the ruins of Mycenae.

A fully orchestrated version of the opera has not survived. The opera was reconstructed from surviving scores by Mauro Bonifacio and had its world premiere at the 2005 Chigiana festival in Siena. It was performed for the second time in a concert staging by Mia Nerenius, using screens and projections, in March 2020 at the Gothenburg Opera.

A chamber version (with some scenes cut and without chorus) co-produced by Greek National Opera and Catapult Opera (the successor to Gotham Chamber Opera) was presented in Athens in January 2024 and New York in April 2024, conducted by Neal Goren. This is the first and only fully staged production of the piece.

== Roles ==
Roles, voice types, premiere casts
Role	Voice type	Premiere cast, 16 March 2005 Conductor: Luca Pfaff	Gothenburg Opera cast, 8 March 2020 Conductor: Anna-Maria Helsing	Greek National Opera cast, 19 January 2024 Conductor: Neal Goren
Hebé	soprano	Michelle Canniccioni	Katarina Karnéus	Melissa Harvey
Anne	mezzo-soprano	Letitia Singleton	Matilda Paulsson	Laurie Rubin
Léonard	tenor	Lorenzo Carola	Markus Pettersson	Joshua Dennis
Alexandre	baritone	Randal Turner	Anton Ljungqvist	Jorell Williams
