= Oqtay Radjabov =

Azerbaijani academic and composer (1941–2022)

- Born: Oqtay Mammadaga oglu Radjabov; 5 April 1941; Baku, Azerbaijan SSR, USSR
- Died: 15 December 2022 (aged 81)
- Education: Azerbaijan State Pedagogical University
- Occupations: Professor; Composer

Oqtay Mammadaga oglu Radjabov (Azerbaijani: Oqtay Məmmədağa oğlu Rəcəbov; 5 April 1941 – 15 December 2022) was an Azerbaijani academic and composer.

== Biography ==
Radjabov was born in Baku on 5 April 1941. He earned a degree in physics from the Azerbaijan State Pedagogical University and subsequently taught the subject at an evening school. He became a professor of Azerbaijani folk music and an editor for Azerbaijanfilm. He released six collections of children's songs, focusing on the subjects of patriotism, nature, and mathematics.

Radjabov died on 15 December 2022, at the age of 81.

== Awards ==
- Lenin Komsomol Prize of the Azerbaijan SSR (1982)
- Honored Teacher of the Azerbaijan SSR (1987)
- Taraggi Medal (2006)
- Honored Art Worker of Azerbaijan (2019)

== Works ==
=== Operas ===
- Göyçək Fatma (1992)
- Xeyir və Şər (1994)
- Sərçəcik (2012)
- Atatürk (2016)

=== Musical comedies ===
- Əlin cibində olsun (2001)
- Şeytanın yubileyi

=== Symphonic pieces ===
- 4 saylı Simfoniya (1997)
- Simli orkestr üçün 5 saylı Simfoniya (1998)

=== Books and articles ===
- Musiqi və mənəvi tərbiyə (1995)
- Musiqi (1998)
- Dahilik fenomeni haqqında nə bilirik? (1999)
