= Franz Mohr =

German-American piano tuner (1927–2022)

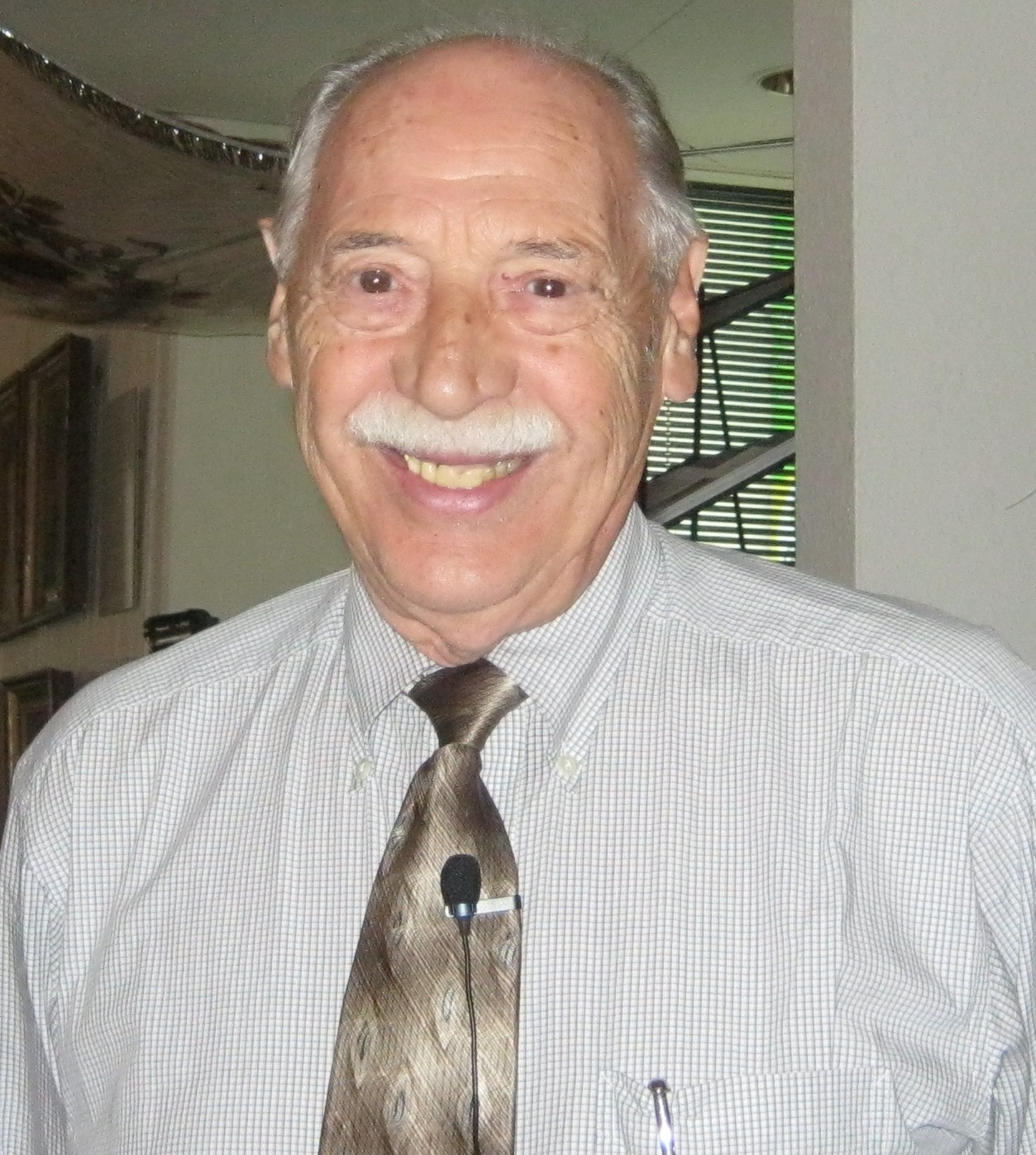
- Mohr in 2012
- Born: September 17, 1927; Nörvenich, Germany
- Died: March 28, 2022 (aged 94); Lynbrook, New York, US
- Occupation: Piano technician

Franz Mohr (September 17, 1927 – March 28, 2022) was a German-born American piano technician. As chief technician of Steinway & Sons from 1968 to 1992, Mohr frequently tuned pianos for numerous leading concert pianists, including Glenn Gould, Vladimir Horowitz, Sviatoslav Richter, and Artur Rubinstein.

== Life and career ==
Franz Mohr was born in Nörvenich, Germany on September 17, 1927. The second of three sons, Mohr's family enjoyed music; Christianity Today remarks that "Mendelssohn, Mozart, and Beethoven were as familiar as bratwurst and potatoes". His father—Jakob Mohr, a postal worker—was an amateur musician who sung and played the guitar, mandolin, and zither. His mother Christina (née Stork) Mohr and the elder Mohr moved the family to the town of Düren in Franz's early years.

In his youth, Franz Mohr attended the University of Music in Cologne and the Academy of Music in Detmold; at the former, he survived a bombing raid, which damaged the university's organ. His initial music interest was in playing violin and viola, while he also played both guitar and mandolin in German dance bands. While playing Dixieland jazz in dance bands, he met Elisabeth Zillikens, whom he married in 1954; together, they had two sons, Michael and Peter, and a daughter, Ellen. Issues with tendonitis in his left hand compromised Mohr's goals as a violin soloist, so he abandoned the instrument.

External videos
- Excerpt from the 2007 film Note by Note
- Franz Mohr discusses his craft and career

Mohr was chief technician of Steinway & Sons from 1968 to 1992.

Throughout his career, he tuned the pianos of concert pianists such as Van Cliburn, Emil Gilels, Glenn Gould, Vladimir Horowitz, Maurizio Pollini, Sviatoslav Richter, Artur Rubinstein, and Rudolf Serkin.
