= Andreia Pinto Correia =

Portuguese composer (born 1971)

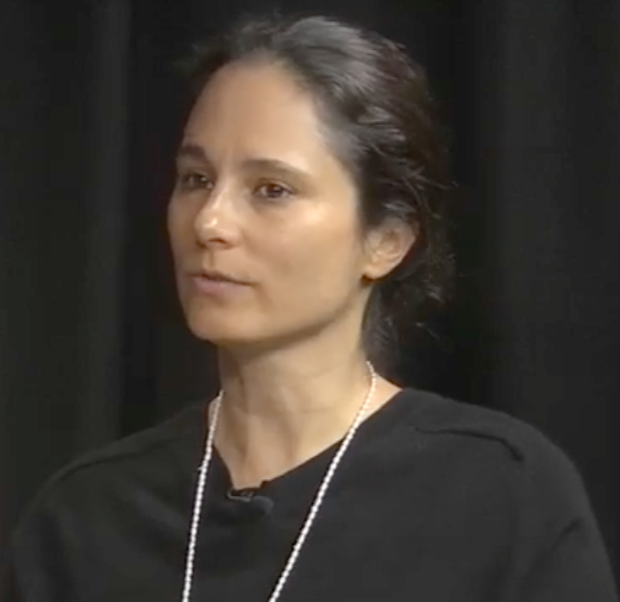
- In a 2018 interview
- Born: 23 August 1971 (age 55); Lisbon, Portugal
- Education: Amateur Music Academy; Hot Club of Portugal; University of Lisbon; New England Conservatory of Music
- Occupation: Composer
- Awards: Guggenheim Fellowship (2015)
- Musical career
- Genres: Classical music

Andreia Pinto-Correia (born 23 August 1971) is a Portuguese composer based in the United States. A 2015 Guggenheim Fellow, she has performed for the Minnesota Orchestra Composer Institute and New York Philharmonic.

== Biography ==
Andreia Pinto-Correia was born on 23 August 1971 in Lisbon. She is the daughter of literature professors, with her father João David Pinto Correia being one of her creative collaborators. Raised in her birthplace, she was influenced by Johann Wolfgang von Goethe, whose stories her mother did Portuguese-language translations of, as well as the medieval literature her father would read to her before bedtime.

Pinto-Correia was educated at the Amateur Music Academy, the Jazz School of the Hot Club of Portugal, and the University of Lisbon, all in her native Lisbon. She later studied at the New England Conservatory of Music, where she studied under Bob Brookmeyer and Michael Gandolfi and obtained her Master of Music and Doctor of Music degrees. She has worked as composer-in-residence for OrchestrUtópica and the Bowdoin International Music Festival, as well as curator for the latter and the Institute for Advanced Study's Fertile Crescent concert. She has also served as visiting professor at the Jacobs School of Music, as well as an honorary fellow at the Australian National University.

In 2011, Pinto-Correia's piece "Elegia a Al-Mu'tamid" was performed at SONiC: Sounds of a New Century; Anthony Tommasini of The New York Times said it was "like an aural fabric of piercing sustained harmonies, restless melodic bits and gurgling instrumental bursts" and a "dark, intense melody for viola". She performed at the 2012 Minnesota Orchestra Composer Institute; Rob Hubbard of the St. Paul Pioneer Press said that her "evocative soundscapes [...] certainly have a future there". Joshua Kosman criticized her symphonic poem "Alfama" at its 2013 premiere at the Berkeley Symphony, saying that its layered nature "is so gray and unattractive – densely dissonant without pointing in any clear harmonic direction – that the effect is muted".

In 2015, Pinto-Correia was awarded a Guggenheim Fellowship in music composition. In 2020, she was awarded an American Academy of Arts and Letters Arts and Letters Award in Music. In March 2022, her piece "Os Pássaros da Noite" premiered at the Lincoln Center, performed by the New York Philharmonic and conducted by Gustavo Dudamel; Joshua Barone of The New York Times praised the piece's "buoyant, dancing mood" and gloom-free tone.

Pinto-Correia lives in Brooklyn.
