= Lucy Rowan Mann =

American nonprofit administrator (1921–2022)

Lucy Rowan Mann (June 20, 1921 – January 16, 2022) was an American nonprofit administrator. She was the executive director of the Walter W. Naumburg Foundation.
