= Béla Dekany =

Hungarian-born British violinist (1928–2022)

Béla Dekany (22 April 1928 – 27 December 2022) was a Hungarian-born British violinist.

== Biography ==
Dekany was born as Béla Berger in Budapest to a Jewish family on 22 April 1928. Following his father's death, he adopted his cousin's surname, Dekany, which sounded less Jewish.

Dekany began his musical education at the Franz Liszt Academy in Budapest at age ten. His life was dramatically altered during World War II when he and his mother were interned in concentration camps, including Bergen-Belsen and Theresienstadt, until their liberation by Russian forces in 1945.

After the war, Dekany resumed his violin studies in Budapest before moving to Vienna and Switzerland. In 1951, he emigrated to Australia to play with the Sydney Symphony Orchestra. In 1956, he moved to Britain and joined the Philharmonia Orchestra.

In 1962, Dekany founded the Dekany Quartet in the Netherlands and focused on recording all 68 of Haydn's string quartets. He later served as the leader of the BBC Symphony Orchestra for 23 years, where he also contributed to education as a teacher at the Guildhall School of Music and Drama.

Dekany married Dorothy Browning, a cellist, in 1961, and they had two children. He retired from playing but remained engaged with music until his death on 27 December 2022.
