= Violin Concerto (Mazzoli) =

2021 concerto by Missy Mazzoli

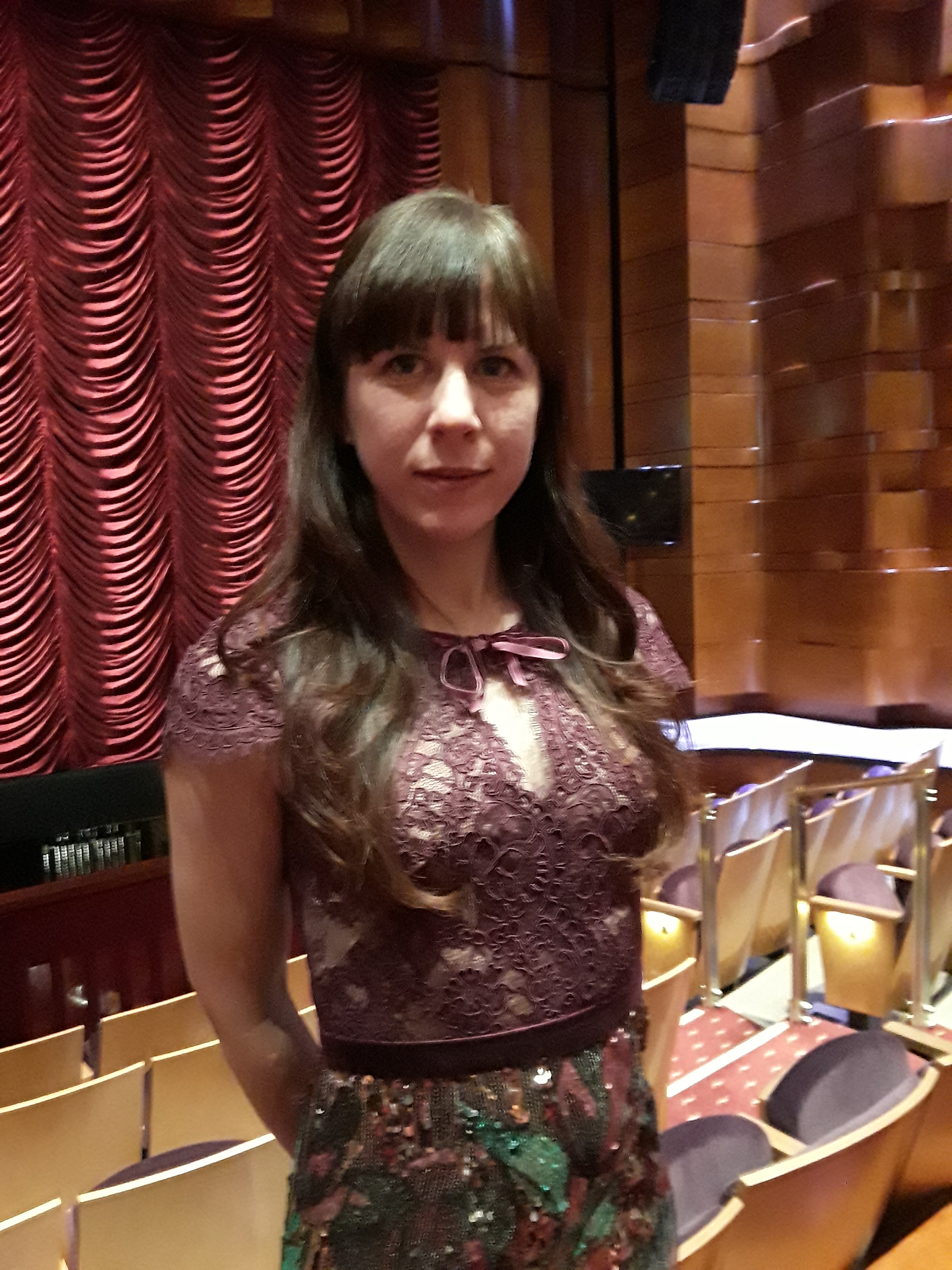
Missy Mazzoli in 2018

Missy Mazzoli's Violin Concerto (Procession) was composed in 2021 for the violinist Jennifer Koh on a commission from the National Symphony Orchestra, the Cincinnati Symphony Orchestra, and BBC Radio 3, with support by ARCO Collaborative. Its world premiere was given by Koh and the National Symphony Orchestra conducted by Gemma New at the John F. Kennedy Center for the Performing Arts on February 3, 2022.

== Composition ==
The piece lasts approximately 20 minutes and is cast in five movements:

1. Procession in a Spiral
2. St. Vitus
3. O My Soul
4. Bone to Bone, Blood to Blood
5. Procession Ascending

In the score program note, Mazzoli wrote that her concerto "casts the soloist as a soothsayer, sorcerer, healer and pied piper-type character, leading the orchestra through five interconnected healing spells." She elaborated:

Part one, "Procession in a Spiral," references medieval penitential processions; part two, “St. Vitus,” is an homage to the patron saint of dancing, who could reportedly cast out evil spirits; part three, "O My Soul," is a twisted reworking of the hymn of the same name, and part four, "Bone to Bone, Blood to Blood," derives its name from the 9th-century Merseburg Charm, a spell meant to cure broken limbs. In the final movement, "Procession Ascending," the soloist straightens out the spiral of the first section and leads the orchestra straight into the sky.

=== Instrumentation ===
The concerto is scored for solo violin and an orchestra consisting of two flutes (2nd doubling piccolo), two oboes, two clarinets (2nd doubling bass clarinet), two bassoons (2nd doubling contrabassoon), four horns, two trumpets, two trombones, tuba, two percussionists, harp, and strings.

== Reception ==
Reviewing the world premiere, Michael Andor Brodeur of The Washington Post described the concerto as "an unsettling work that opens like a trapdoor, or the moment you fall asleep." He added, "Koh didn’t ride atop the orchestra so much as engage in a prolonged tug-of-war with it—her solos tensing like a tendon within the body of the music. She attacked short solos as if she were sawing through a pipe; elsewhere she strung silvery threads through a dense fabric of dark strings and darting flutes. Her slow-burning centerpiece cadenza was a searing highlight of the evening." Alastair Macaulay of the Financial Times also praised the piece, remarking, "The score made striking, magical contrasts between spectral highest notes and lowest depth-charges, with surging portamenti between the two extremes."

Andrew Clements of The Guardian was more critical of the piece, however, writing, "There's a feisty solo cadenza, and some beautiful passages in which solo-violin harmonics are suspended over chains of slowly descending scales from the woodwind. But the music constantly seems to be travelling towards a destination, a resolution, that it never reaches, and the narrative of its 20-minute journey is not quite eventful enough to justify the lack of that arrival."
