= Disella Larusdottir =

Icelandic opera singer

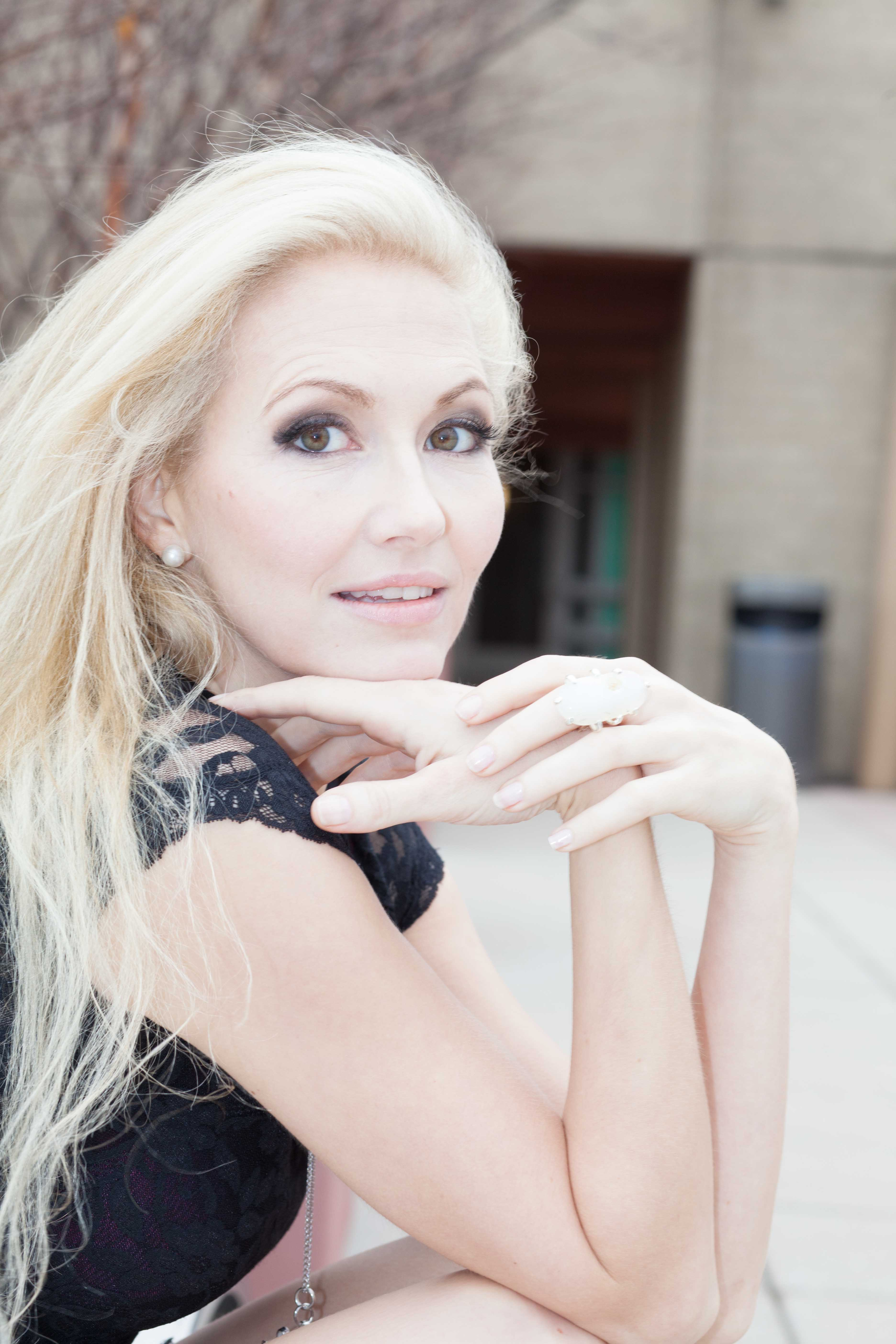
- Dísella Lárusdóttir in a photo shoot in New York, photographer is Fay Fox.

Background information
- Born: 12 March 1977 (age 49)
- Genre: Film score
- Occupations: Composer; musician

Disella Larusdottir (born 12 March 1977) is an Icelandic opera soprano that has sung for the Metropolitan Opera of New York. In 2022, she received a Grammy for the best opera recording and became the second Icelander to win the award.

She is the daughter of Lárus Sveinsson, a trumpet player and Sigríður Þorvaldsdóttir, an actress, and she has two sisters. She published the album Solo noi in 2007 and has sung in Söngvakeppnin, the Icelandic competition that selects its entries for Eurovision. She graduated from Westminster Choir College in 2005. In 2007 she became an semi-finalist in Metropolitan Opera National Council Auditions.
