= Bridgette Wimberly =

American playwright (1954–2022)

Bridgette Angela Wimberly (January 7, 1954 – December 1, 2022) was an American playwright and librettist.

== Biography ==
Born in Cleveland, Ohio to John Wimberly and Conchita Wimberly (née Smith), Bridgette Wimberly attended Columbia University where she earned a bachelor’s degree in 1978 and also pursued graduate studies in medical research. She worked in medical research at Columbia-Presbyterian Medical Center prior to her career as a playwright.

She is best known for Saint Lucy’s Eyes, a play about a back-alley abortionist living in 1968 Memphis. In 2015, she wrote the libretto for Charlie Parker's Yardbird. She died in December 2022 at age 68.
