= Paul Goodchild =

Australian musician

Paul Goodchild (August 23, 1960 – March 29, 2022) was an Australian trumpet player.

== Career ==
Paul Goodchild began his career in 1966 as a member of the community group Bondi Brass (formerly Waverley Bondi Beach Band), who had been formed by his father, Cliff.

He joined the Sydney Symphony Orchestra in 1979 aged 18, and later became Associate Principal Trumpet. He was a member of the Orchestra for 42 years. He would often perform with Bondi Brass, and later took over from his father as their music director. He was also a Board Director of the Australian School Band and Orchestra Festival, that had been founded by his father in 1962.

He performed with several groups around Australia, including Sydney Philharmonia Orchestra, Australian Chamber Orchestra, and the Australia Ensemble. He also taught at the Sydney Conservatorium, Newcastle Conservatorium, and at music camps.

In 2019, Paul Goodchild was diagnosed with cancer. He retired in August 2020, but continued performing into 2021. He died in March 2022, and is survived by his wife Yvette, a former principal viola player in the Sydney Symphony Orchestra, and children Morley and Alana.
