= Charlie Parker's Yardbird =

2015 opera

Charlie Parker's Yardbird is an opera with music by Swiss composer Daniel Schnyder and an English-language libretto by Bridgette A. Wimberly. It was co-commissioned by Opera Philadelphia and Gotham Chamber Opera. The opera concerns the jazz icon Charlie Parker, his tumultuous life and his relationships; it is also about America, its music, its opioid crisis, and its racial inequality.

== Performance history ==
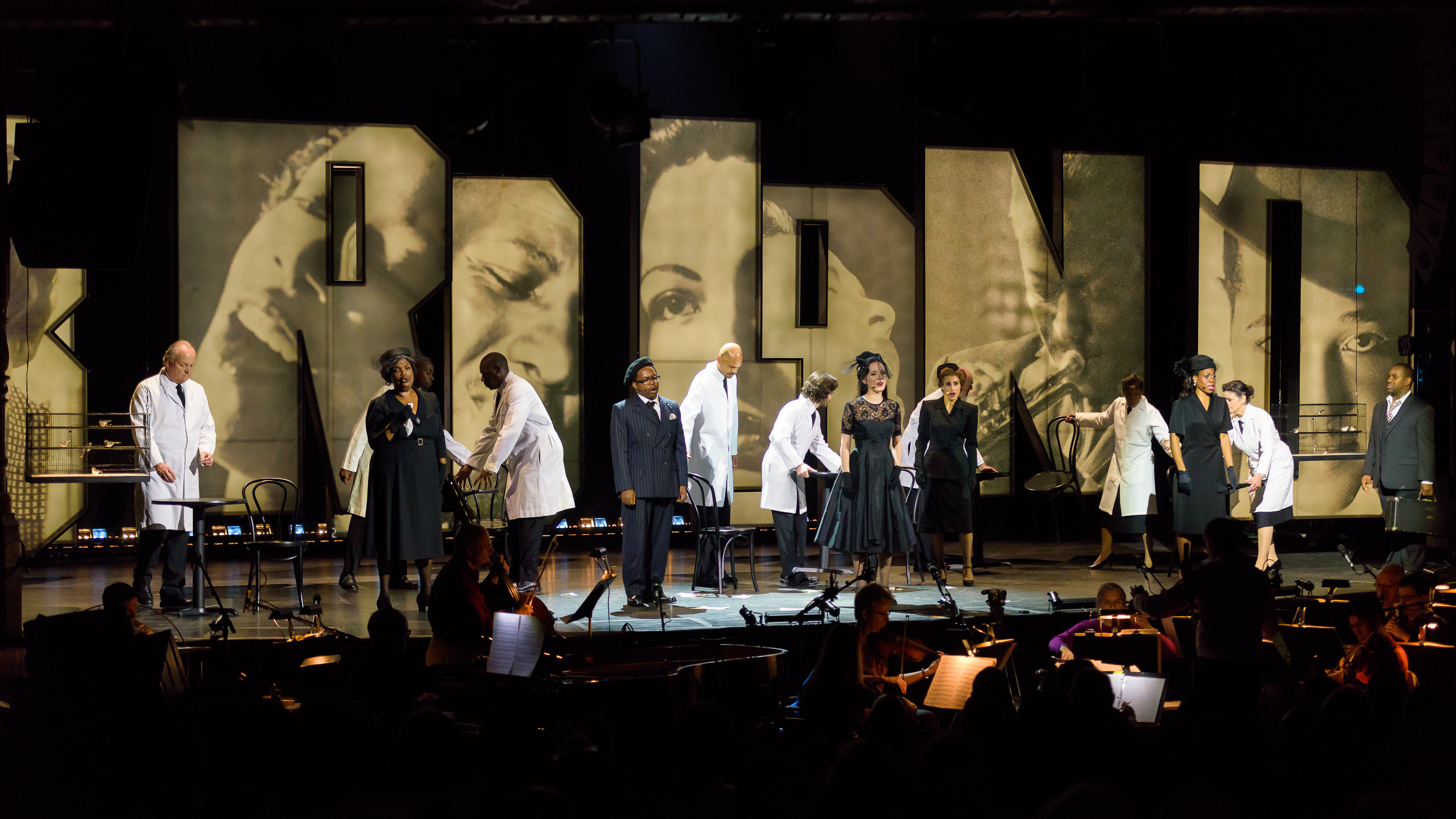
Scene from the Apollo Theater production, 2016

The world premiere took place at Philadelphia's Perelman Theater June 5, 2015, conducted by Corrado Rovaris. The original production featured direction by Ron Daniels, set design by Riccardo Hernandez, costume design by Emily Rebholz, lighting design by Scott Zielinski. It was performed the following April at Harlem's Apollo Theater, a performance which was then broadcast nationally. It has also been performed at Madison Opera (February 2017), Lyric Opera of Chicago (March 2017), Hackney Empire and English National Opera (June 2017), Atlanta Opera (September 2018), Arizona Opera (November 2018), Seattle Opera (February 2020), Pittsburgh Opera (April 2021), Dayton Performing Arts Alliance (October 2022), New Orleans Opera Association (January 2023), upcoming productions include Indianapolis Opera (March 2023).

== Roles ==
Roles, voice types, premiere cast
Role	Voice type	Premiere cast, 5 June 2015 Conductor: Corrado Rovaris
Charlie Parker	tenor	Lawrence Brownlee
Nica	mezzo-soprano	Tamara Mumford
Addie Parker	soprano	Angela Brown
Rebecca Parker	mezzo-soprano	Chrystal Williams
Doris Parker	soprano	Angela Mortellaro
Dizzy Gillespie	baritone	Will Liverman
Chan Parker	soprano	Rachel Sterrenberg

== Synopsis ==
This one-act opera features roles based on real-life figures Charlie Parker, Dizzy Gillespie, Pannonica de Koenigswarter, Chan Parker, and Charlie Parker's wives and mother. The opera does not purport to depict actual events as they occurred or statements, beliefs, or opinions of the persons depicted.

As the opera begins, Charlie Parker's spirit finds itself at Birdland, the jazz club named after him. He has just died; his body is still at the segregated hotel suite of Nica de Koenigswarter. Panicking about the scandal that will ensue when his body is found in her rooms, Nica finds his spirit at Birdland. She wants Chan, Charlie's wife, to identify his body; but Charlie begs Nica not to tell Chan where he is, to keep his secret for a while, until he has time to compose a masterpiece.

Looking for inspiration, Charlie remembers growing up in Kansas City. His neighbors complain about all the noise he makes, learning to play saxophone—particularly the tritone, "the Devil's interval"—while his mother, Addie, worries about his lifestyle in the age of Jim Crow laws. Rebecca, Charlie's first wife, joins Addie in a lament about the challenges of being a wife and mother to black males in the United States. Hoping to save his life, Addie tells Charlie he must leave Kansas City. He promises to make her proud one day, and asks her to take care of his wife and son.

Charlie's third wife, Doris, tries to help him find peace; but there are still unanswered questions. Dizzy Gillespie, on the other hand, brings Charlie inspiration, and together the two musicians triumph as Bebop is born.

Charlie then remembers how he met Chan and went off to conquer California with Dizzy, despite his heroin addiction. Meanwhile, Addie remembers her pride upon hearing Charlie play on the radio.

In California, Charlie hears from Chan that their two-year-old daughter, Pree, is dead. Charlie breaks down and ends up in Camarillo State Hospital. Music facilitates his recovery.

By now Charlie's body has been discovered. Addie wants him buried in Kansas City, but Chan wants to bury him in New York. Doris and Rebecca join the argument over where Charlie is to be buried while the world sings, "Bird lives!"

Charlie realizes that playing the saxophone was his life's work, his masterpiece. He makes peace with himself, frees his soul, and sings lines from Paul Laurence Dunbar's classic poem, "Sympathy".
