= Vincent Calianno =

- Born: December 1, 1979 (age 46); Buffalo, New York, United States
- Origin: New York City, United States
- Genres: Modern classical music
- Occupations: Composer, musician
- Instrument: Piano
- Years active: 1993–present
- Website: droplid.com

Vincent Calianno (born December 1, 1979, in Buffalo, New York) is a New York City and Tucson based composer of contemporary classical music, sound artist, and filmmaker.

== Biography ==
Calianno began writing music at age 11, beginning his composition studies with Livingston Gearhart at the University of New York at Buffalo. He formally studied composition at the Oberlin Conservatory of Music, the Eastman School of Music, and New York University studying with John Luther Adams, Lewis Nielson, Ricardo Zohn-Muldoon, David Liptak, Zack Browning, and Mark Suozzo.

His music has been commissioned and performed by the International Contemporary Ensemble, Alarm Will Sound, JACK Quartet, the Thalea String Quartet, Nouveau Classical Project, Ensemble Mise-en, Rocket City New Music, Jennifer Koh, John Pickford Richards, Kivie Cahn-Lipman, the American Composers Orchestra, the Buffalo Philharmonic, the Tucson Symphony Orchestra, the Bruges Philharmonia, Artifact Dance Project, and others.

== Selected works ==
=== Orchestra ===
- Monument (2024)
- Missed Connections Despite (2017)
- The Facts and Dreams of the World According to Michael Jackson (2014)
- Against Colorado (2011)

=== Concertante ===
- Eating Filumena Lionheart for oboe and chamber ensemble (2009)
- Fuel for electric violoncello solo and orchestra (2001)
- Rutherford B. Hayes for trombone solo and chamber orchestra (1998)

=== Vocal ===
- Sororatorio for voice and pierrot ensemble (2015)
- Magnificat for women's chorus and ensemble (2004)

=== Chamber music ===
- The Galvanic Twitch (2024)
- A History of the String Quartet in its Natural Habitat for string quartet and electronics (2018)
- Notes on the Deliverance Machine for cello trio and electronics (2016)
- When I Dream Some Letters Fall Out Of My Mouth To Make A Word for string trio and electronics (2013)
- Bone Chinoiserie and the Alabastard Cowboy for oboe, clarinet, violin, viola and contrabass (2012)
- les étoiles secrètes for vibraphone and piano (2011)
- String Quartet (2010)
- (i am a devil) pissing into the sunset with a raincoat in my hand for electric violin, electric viola and two percussionists (2005)
- (at times my sadness falls into for piano quartet (2000)
- Elyria-O for five solo contrabasses and chamber ensemble (1999)
- To Boston for Sex for pierrot sextet (1998)

=== Solo instruments ===
- Animal within Animal for Trombone and electronics (2020)
- Ashliner for Violin solo (2020)
- Kodokushi for piano and electronics (2015)
- Visible Light for Viola and electronics (2005)
- Chain Black Cadillac (2004)
- music for sundays 1–5 (1999–2001)

=== Opera ===
- Beckett (2004)
- The Toilet (2000)

=== Ballet ===
- A Painted Devil (2020)
- The Fall of the House of Usher (2010)
- All Men Are Mortal (2009)

=== Silent cinema ===
- Sherlock Jr. (2021)
- Das Kabinett des Dr. Caligari (2016)
- La Passion de Jeanne d’Arc (2002)

== Awards and honors ==
- 2018 Sarah Awards, Best New Podcast
- 2017 Chamber Music America Grant/Commission
- 2016 ASCAP Foundation Rudolf Nissim Prize
- 2014 Alan Menken Scholar, New York University
- 2015 American Composers Forum's National Composition Contest
- 2014 Society of Composers and Lyricists Mentee
- 2011 Minnesota Orchestra Composer Institute
- 2004 Howard Hanson Prize, Eastman School of Music
- 2003 Paul Sacher Scholar, Eastman School of Music

== Selected discography ==
- 2023 Bruges Philharmonia "Missed Connections Despite" (Öhne Records)
- 2022 Jennifer Koh "Alone Together" (Cedille Records)
- 2022 Kivie Cahn-Lipman "Sumna" (New Focus Recordings)
- 2019 The Sons of Berio "[escala.]" (Öhne Records)
