= 2019 in classical music =

This article lists major events and other topics related to classical music in 2019.

== Events ==
- 1 January – The founders of Wichita Grand Opera, Margaret Ann Pent and Parvan Bakardiev, formally retire from the company.
- 3 January
  - The Royal College of Organists announces Hans Fagius and Nicolas Kynaston as the recipients of the RCO Medal for 2019.
  - Wichita Grand Opera announces the appointment of Alan Held as its new artistic director, effective 2 January 2019.
- 8 January – The Artemis Quartet announces the appointment of Suyoen Kim as its new violinist and Harriet Krijgh as its new cellist, effective June 2019.
- 10 January – The Brodsky Quartet announces the appointment of Gina McCormack as its new violinist, to replace the departing Daniel Rowland.
- 11 January – The Orchestre national de France announces the appointment of Johannes Neubert as its next general director, effective 1 September 2019.
- 14 January – The Gran Teatre del Liceu announces the appointment of Víctor Garcia de Gomar as its next artistic director, effective with the 2019–2020 season.
- 15 January
  - Wexford Festival Opera announces the appointment of Rosetta Cucchi as its next artistic director, effective November 2019, with an initial contract of 6 years.
  - Cal Performances announces the appointment of Jeremy Geffen as its next executive and artistic director, effective 1 April 2019.
- 16 January
  - The Stiftung Niedersachsen announces the appointments of Antje Weithaas and Oliver Wille as the next co-artistic directors of the Joseph Joachim International Violin Competition Hannover.
  - Raidió Teilifís Éireann announces the appointment of Jaime Martín as the next chief conductor of the RTÉ National Symphony Orchestra, effective September 2019, with an initial contract of 3 seasons.
- 17 January
  - The Ernst von Siemens Music Foundation announces Rebecca Saunders as the recipient of the Ernst von Siemens Musikpreis 2019, the second woman and the first female composer ever to be honoured with the award.
  - The Philharmonia Baroque Orchestra announces the appointment of Richard Egarr as its next music director, effective with the 2021–2022 season, with an initial contract of 5 years.
- 18 January – The Schleswig-Holstein Musik Festival announces Aigerim Seilova as the recipient of its Hindemith-Preis 2019.
- 19 January
  - The Royal Concertgebouw Orchestra formally opens its new headquarters, RCO House.
  - Chicago Opera Theater announces the appointment of Ashley Magnus as its next general director, with immediate effect.
- 21 January – The Barbican Centre, London Symphony Orchestra, and Guildhall School of Music and Drama jointly unveil initial designs for the proposed privately funded centre for music in the City of London.
- 22 January – WFMT announces the appointment of George Preston as its new vice-president and general manager, effective 1 March 2019.
- 24 January
  - Tasmin Little announces her intention to retire from classical music performance in the summer of 2020.
  - The Handel and Haydn Society announces that Harry Christophers is to conclude his tenure as its artistic director at the close of the 2020–2021 season.
- 25 January
  - The BBC Symphony Orchestra announces the appointment of Dalia Stasevska as its next principal guest conductor, the first woman to be named to the post and the second female conductor ever to be given a titled post with a BBC orchestra.
  - The Ulster Orchestra announces the appointment of Daniele Rustioni as its next chief conductor, effective September 2019.
  - The city of Schwäbisch Gmünd announces John Rutter as the recipient of the Preis der Europäischen Kirchenmusik 2019.
- 26 January
  - Elena Kats-Chernin is made an Officer (AO) in the General Division of the Order of Australia.
  - Yvonne Kenny receives the 2019 Australian of the Year in the UK award from the Australia Day Foundation.
- 27 January – Bernard Haitink conducts his final concert with the Royal Concertgebouw Orchestra, at the Concertgebouw, Amsterdam.
- 29 January
  - Through the auspices of the Italian Ministry of Cultural Heritage and Activities, over 5000 papers and sketches by Giuseppe Verdi become available to scholars for the first time.
  - Police in Ann Arbor, Michigan arrest David Daniels and his husband, Scott Walters, on charges of second-degree assault, following allegations by Samuel Schultz that the couple assaulted him in 2010.
- 30 January – The Colorado Music Festival announces the appointment of Peter Oundjian as its next music director.
- 1 February
  - Deutsche Grammophon announces the signing of Mirga Gražinytė-Tyla to an exclusive long-term recording contract, the first female conductor ever signed to such a contract with the label.
  - The Theater Lübeck announces the appointment of Stefan Vladar as its next Generalmusikdirektor, effective 1 August 2019, with an initial contract of 5 seasons.
  - The Léonie Sonning Music Foundation announces Barbara Hannigan as the recipient of the Léonie Sonning Music Prize 2020.
- 6 February – The Lincoln Center for the Performing Arts announces the appointment of Henry Timms as its next president and chief executive officer, effective May 2019.
- 8 February – The Spanish National Orchestra announces the elevation of its principal conductor David Afkham to the posts of chief conductor and artistic director, effective 1 September 2019, through the 2020–2021 season.
- 12 February – The Jerusalem Symphony Orchestra announces the appointment of Steven Sloane as its next music director, effective with the 2019–2020 season.
- 13 February
  - The Polar Music Prize announces Anne-Sophie Mutter as one of the three winners of the 2019 Polar Music Prize.
  - Annapolis Opera announces that Ronald Gretz, its current artistic director, is to retire from the post effective 30 June 2020.
- 14 February
  - The Boston Symphony Orchestra and its principal flautist, Elizabeth Rowe, reach a confidential, undisclosed settlement on her pay discrimination lawsuit against the orchestra filed originally in July 2018.
  - The Bozeman Symphony announces the resignation of Matthew Savery as its music director, following allegations of bullying and verbal harassment against him by musicians and past orchestra staff.
- 19 February – The Louisville Orchestra announces the appointment of Robert Massey as its new chief executive officer, effective March 2019.
- 20 February – Future Talent announces Sheku Kanneh-Mason as its newest Ambassador.
- 21 February
  - The Stichting Praemium Erasmianum announces John Adams as the recipient of the Erasmus Prize 2019.
  - Florentine Opera announces the appointment of Maggey Oplinger as its new general director and chief executive officer, effective 1 March 2019.
- 22 February
  - Opera Australia announces the awarding of its Opera Australia Trophy to Elijah Moshinsky, the second recipient of the honour in the history of the company.
  - The city of Hanau announces Olli Mustonen as the recipient of its Hindemith-Preis der Stadt Hanau for 2019.
  - The Segerstrom Center for the Arts announces the departure of Terrence Dwyer as its president, with immediate effect.
- 25 February – Young Concert Artists announces the appointment of Daniel Kellogg as its new president, effective 1 July 2019.
- 27 February – The Duisburg Philharmonic announces the appointment of Axel Kober as its next Generalmusikdirektor, effective with the 2019–2020 season, with an initial contract of 3 years.
- 28 February
  - The Deutscher Musikautorenpreis announces Wolfgang Rihm as the recipient of the Deutscher Musikautorenpreis 2019 for his life's work.
  - At an internal company meeting, San Francisco Opera indicates that it is to make redundant its director of communications and public affairs, Jon Finck, and its director of development, Andrew Morgan, with those posts not to be re-staffed, others to be abolished, and four open positions not to be filled.
- 1 March
  - The Dresdner Musikfestspiele announces Joshua Bell as the recipient of its Glashütte Original Musikfestspielepreis 2019.
  - The Cincinnati Symphony Orchestra announces that its concertmaster (leader) emeritus, Jonathan Lees, is to retire from the orchestra, as a result of persistent nerve injuries in his left hand.
  - The La Jolla Music Society announces the appointment of Ted DeDee as its next chief executive officer and president, effective 1 April 2019.
- 4 March – Scala Radio, a new classical radio station, begins transmission in the UK.
- 8 March
  - A British Phonographic Industry report indicates that with respect to music provision, UK state schools have seen a 21% decrease over the past 5 years, compared to a net increase of 7% in independent schools during the same period.
  - Birmingham Contemporary Music Group announces the appointment of Seb Huckle as its new executive director.
  - Never heard during the composer's lifetime, Roland Furieux by Augusta Holmès receives its world premiere performance by the BBC National Orchestra of Wales, conducted by Valentina Peleggi, following reconstruction of the full orchestral score.
  - The opera Das Schloß Dürande, with music by Othmar Schoeck, unstaged since its 1943 premiere, receives the first performance in its second-ever production, by the Staatstheater Meiningen, with a revised libretto by Francesco Micieli.
  - Cincinnati Opera announces that its general director, Patricia Beggs, is to retire from the post in August 2020.
- 11 March – The musicians of the Chicago Symphony Orchestra take industrial action, in protest at proposed changes by management to the musicians' pension structure.
- 13 March – The Vienna Philharmonic announces the election of Bernard Haitink as an honorary member of the orchestra.
- 14 March – The Tulsa Symphony announces the appointment of Keith C. Elder as its next executive director, effective 5 August 2019.
- 17 March – The Borletti-Buitoni Trust announces the Quartetto di Cremona as the recipient of the Franco Buitoni Award 2019.
- 18 March – The board of directors of the Teatro alla Scala votes to return €3 million of funds to Saudi Arabia, following protests at the attempted donation.
- 19 March
  - The Czech National Symphony Orchestra announces the appointment of Steven Mercurio as its next chief conductor, effective with the 2019–2020 season.
  - The Kansas City Symphony announces the appointment of Daniel E. Beckley as its new executive director, effective 29 July 2019.
- 20 March – The Flanders Symphony Orchestra announces the appointment of Kristiina Poska as its next chief conductor, the first female conductor to be named to the post, effective with the 2019–2020 season.
- 21 March – Seattle Opera announces the appointment of Christina Scheppelmann as its next general director, effective August 2019.
- 25 March – The Regensburger Domspatzen announces the appointment of Christian Heiss as its next director, effective September 2019.
- 26 March
  - The Symphonieorchester Vorarlberg announces the appointment of Leo McFall as its next chief conductor, effective with the 2020–2021 season, with an initial contract of 5 years.
  - The San Antonio Symphony announces that Sebastian Lang-Lessing is to conclude his music directorship of the orchestra at the close of the 2019–2020 season.
- 27 March – Edita Gruberová sings her final opera performance, as Elizabetta in Donizetti's Roberto Devereux, at the Bavarian State Opera.
- 29 March
  - The Armenia National Opera and Ballet Theatre terminates the contract of Constantine Orbelian as its director.
  - The Orlando Philharmonic Orchestra announces the resignation of Christopher T. Barton as its executive director, and the appointments of Mary Palmer and Mark Fischer as co-interim executive directors.
- 2 April – The Musikverein announces the appointment of Stephan Pauly as its new Intendant, effective 1 July 2020.
- 5 April
  - The Argovia Philharmonic announces the appointment of Rune Bergmann as its next chief conductor, effective with the 2020–2021 season, with an initial contract of 3 seasons.
  - The Shed officially opens in New York City, including the performance exhibit Reich Richter Pärt.
- 7 April – Opera San José announces simultaneously the retirement of its current general director, Larry Hancock, as of 30 June 2020, and the appointment of Khori Dastoor as its new general director, effective 1 July 2020.
- 8 April
  - Kirill Serebrennikov, director of the ballet Nureyev, is released from house arrest at the orders of a judge of the Meshchansky district court in Moscow, with a change in his conditions to a no-travel order.
  - The Richard Tucker Music Foundation announces Lisette Oropesa as the recipient of the Richard Tucker Award for 2019.
- 12 April – The Finnish Radio Symphony Orchestra (FRSO) announces that Hannu Lintu is to conclude his chief conductorship of the FRSO at the close of the 2020–2021 season.
- 13 April – Yo-Yo Ma performs at Tres Laredos Park in Laredo, Texas, USA, near the Juarez-Lincoln International Bridge, as part of his 'Bach Project', and part of the 'Day of Action' activities between the sister cities of Laredo, Texas, and Nuevo Laredo, Mexico.
- 16 April – Gautier Capuçon performs Après un rêve by Gabriel Fauré outside of Notre-Dame de Paris, one day after the Notre-Dame fire.
- 17 April
  - The Staatstheater Cottbus announces the appointment of Stephan Märki as its new Intendant and director of opera, effective with the 2020–2021 season.
  - English National Opera announces the resignation of Daniel Kramer as its artistic director, effective at the end of July 2019.
  - The Court of Appeal unanimously upholds the earlier ruling by the High Court of Justice in the case of Christopher Goldscheider v. Royal Opera House Covent Garden Foundation, in favour of Goldscheider.
  - The Berkeley Symphony announces the appointment of Joseph Young as its new music director, effective with the 2019–2020 season, with an initial contract of 3 years.
- 20 April – At the Cour des Invalides, a benefit concert occurs for the restoration of Notre-Dame de Paris after the Notre-Dame fire, including participation from classical music artists Pretty Yende, Julie Fuchs, Gautier Capuçon, Lang Lang, Jakub Józef Orliński, and musicians from the Orchestre National de France and the Chœur et de la Maîtrise de Radio France, conducted by Václav Luks.
- 23 April – The Royal Concertgebouw Orchestra (KCO) and Daniele Gatti issue a joint, final statement of partial conciliation, following the August 2018 dismissal by the KCO of Gatti as its chief conductor in the wake of allegations of sexual misconduct by Gatti.
- 24 April
  - The Netherlands Philharmonic Orchestra announces the appointment of Lorenzo Viotti as its next chief conductor, effective with the 2021–2022 season. With this appointment, Viotti is to become chief conductor of the Netherlands Chamber Orchestra and Dutch National Opera in parallel, simultaneously.
  - Orfeo 55 announces cessation of operations, citing its weakened finances and the extensive separate commitments of its music director, Nathalie Stutzmann.
- 25 April – The Development Management Sub-Committee of the City of Edinburgh Council approves plans for the construction of Dunard Centre, the first purpose-built music and performance venue in Edinburgh in over 100 years.
- 26 April – Following mediation by Chicago mayor Rahm Emanuel, the Chicago Federation of Musicians and the Chicago Symphony Orchestra (CSO) Association announce a tentative agreement to their labour dispute, with the Chicago Symphony musicians scheduled to vote on the agreement on 27 April 2019.
- 27 April – The musicians of the Chicago Symphony Orchestra vote to ratify, and the CSO Association board of trustees vote to approve, a five-year contract agreed upon the day before, to resolve the 7-week labour dispute at the orchestra.
- 29 April
  - The PRS Foundation announces that Vanessa Reed is to stand down as its executive director, effective with the summer of 2019.
  - New Music USA announces the appointment of Vanessa Reed as its new president and chief executive officer, effective 12 August 2019.
- 30 April – The Seoul Philharmonic Orchestra announces the appointment of Osmo Vänskä as its next music director, effective January 2020, with an initial contract of 3 years.
- 2 May – The Finnish Radio Symphony Orchestra announces the appointment of Nicholas Collon as its next chief conductor, effective with the 2021–2022 season, the first non-Finnish conductor ever to be named chief conductor of the FRSO.
- 3 May – At Tulsa Opera, Lucia Lucas sings the role of Don Giovanni in the first night of its new production of the Mozart opera, the first transgender woman to sing a leading role in an American opera production.
- 6 May – The Phoenix Chorale announces the appointment of Christopher Gabbitas as its new artistic director, effective with the 2019–2020 season, with an initial contract of 5 years.
- 7 May
  - BBC Radio 3 announces the musicians for its New Generation Artists scheme from 2019 to 2021:
    - Eric Lu, piano
    - Alexander Gadjiev, piano
    - Timothy Ridout, viola
    - Consone Quartet
    - Johan Dalene, violin
    - Rob Luft, jazz guitar
    - Ema Nikoslovska, mezzo-soprano
  - The Metropolitan Opera announces Lisette Oropesa as the recipient of its 2019 Beverly Sills Artist Award.
- 9 May – Finnish National Opera and Ballet announces the appointment of Hannu Lintu as its next chief conductor, effective from 1 January 2022 to 30 June 2026.
- 10 May
  - The Residentie Orchestra announces the appointment of Anja Bihlmaier as its next chief conductor, the first female conductor ever to be named to the post, and the second female conductor to be named chief conductor of any Dutch orchestra, effective with the 2021–2022 season.
  - The Philharmonia Orchestra announces that Helen Sprott is to stand down as its managing director.
  - The Indianapolis Symphony Orchestra announces that Krzysztof Urbański is to conclude his tenure as its music director at the close of the 2020–2021 season.
- 13 May
  - The Song Company announces that it has entered voluntary administration, with the prospect of bankruptcy and dissolution of the organisation.
  - The Washington Chorus announces that Christopher Bell is to conclude his tenure as its artistic director at the close of the 2019–2020 season.
  - The second Scottish Awards for New Music took place in Drygate, Glasgow, run by New Music Scotland. Hosted by Kate Molleson the winners were Garth Knox, Red Note Ensemble, Helen Grime, James Dillon, Ailie Robertson, Grit Orchestra, Pippa Murphy, Sean Shibe, sound Festival, Nevis Ensemble, Scanner and Simon Thacker
  - The Rochester Philharmonic Orchestra announces that Ward Stare is to conclude his music directorship of the orchestra at the close of the 2020–2021 season.
- 14 May
  - The Ann Arbor Symphony Orchestra announces that Mary Steffek Blaske is to retire as its executive director.
  - Scottish Awards for New Music:
    - New Music Performer of the Year – Garth Knox
    - Royal Conservatoire of Scotland (RCS) Award for Contribution to New Music in Scotland – Red Note Ensemble
    - Award for Large Scale New Work – Helen Grime: Woven Space
    - Dorico Award for Small Scale New Work – James Dillon: Quartet No. 9
    - Recorded New Work – softLOUD (Sean Shibe, Delphian Records)
    - The Good Spirits Company Award for Innovation in New Traditional Music – Ailie Robertson: Seven Sorrows; Grit Orchestra: Bothy Culture (joint winners)
    - EVM Award for Electroacoustic/Sound Art Work – Pippa Murphy: Breathe in me
    - Creative Programming – sound
    - RCS Award for Making It Happen – Nevis Ensemble
    - Community/Education Project – Lost At Sea East Neuk Festival / Scanner / Svend McEwan-Brown
    - RCS Award for Collaboration in New Music – Simon Thacker: Svara-Kanti
- 15 May – Following legal proceedings, Julie Fuchs receives from the Hamburg State Opera her full artist's fee, following their sudden 2018 cancellation of her scheduled appearances in their production of The Magic Flute, when she was four months pregnant.
- 16 May – Susan Wadsworth formally concludes her 58-year tenure as director of Young Concert Artists.
- 17 May – The Ministerium für Wissenschaft, Forschung und Kunst announces the appointment of Georg Fritzsch as the new Generalmusikdirektor of the city of Karlsruhe, which includes the chief conductorship of the Badischen Staatskapelle.
- 20 May
  - The China International Music Competition announces the laureates of its first-ever competition:
    - First prize – Tony Siqi Yun
    - Second prize – Alexander Malofeev
    - Third prize – MacKenzie Melemed
  - The Nordwestdeutsche Philharmonie announces the appointment of Jonathon Hayward as its next chief conductor, effective 1 January 2021.
- 22 May
  - The Philharmonia Orchestra announces the appointment of Santtu-Matias Rouvali as its next principal conductor, effective with the 2021–2022 season, with an initial contract of 5 years.
  - The Benedetti Foundation announces the appointment of Michael Garvey as its first-ever executive director.
  - The BBC National Orchestra of Wales announces that Michael Garvey is to stand down as director of the BBC NOW and the BBC National Chorus of Wales.
  - The Bach Choir of Bethlehem announces that Bridget George is to retire as its executive director in December 2020, and that Greg Funfgeld is to retire as its artistic director and conductor in June 2021.
- 23 May – The Utah Symphony announces that Thierry Fischer is to conclude his tenure as its music director at the end of the 2021–2022 season.
- 30 May – The Baltimore Symphony Orchestra announces the reduction of its season to 40 weeks from 52 weeks, and the cancellation of its previously scheduled summer concerts for 2019, without prior warning from orchestra management to the orchestra musicians.
- 31 May – The Royal Concertgebouw Orchestra announces that Jan Raes is to stand down as its managing director at the end of 2019.
- 3 June – Musica Viva Australia announces the appointment of Paul Kildea as its new artistic director, in succession to Carl Vine.
- 5 June – The Vancouver Symphony Orchestra announces that Kelly Tweedale is to stand down as its president and chief executive officer, as of the end of August 2019.
- 6 June – Over 100 years after its composition, the only symphony of Charlotte Sohy receives its premiere performance, with the Orchestre Victor-Hugo Franche-Comté conducted by Débora Waldman.
- 7 June
  - Queen's Birthday Honours:
    - Stephen Cleobury, Ian Stoutzker, and David Pountney are each made a Knight Bachelor.
    - Jonathan Dove, Joanna MacGregor, and Mark Padmore are each made a Commander of the Order of British Empire.
    - Kathryn Harries and Robin Ticciati are each made an Officer of the Order of the British Empire.
    - Mary Bevan, Sophie Bevan, Anna Meredith, and Timothy Reynish are each made a Member of the Order of the British Empire.
  - The Berlin Philharmonic Orchestra announces the appointment of Daniel Barenboim as its honorary conductor, the first conductor ever to be given this title with the orchestra.
- 10 June – The Orquestra Sinfônica do Estado de São Paulo announces the appointment of Thierry Fischer as its next music director, effective in 2020, with an initial contract through 2024.
- 11 June – The first night of a new production of Meredith Monk's opera Atlas occurs, the second-ever production of the opera, and the first production staged independently of Monk, by the Los Angeles Philharmonic.
- 12 June
  - In an article from De Volksrant, Bernard Haitink states that his final concert as conductor is to be in September 2019, formalising his previously announced sabbatical into retirement.
  - The Iceland Symphony Orchestra announces the appointment of Eva Ollikainen as its next chief conductor and artistic advisor, the first female conductor ever named to the posts, effective with the 2020–2021 season, with an initial contract through 2024.
  - The Canada Council announces composer Alexina Louie as a recipient of one of the 2019 Molson Prizes.
- 13 June – The Stavanger Symphony Orchestra announces the appointment of Andris Poga as its next chief conductor, effective with the 2021–2022 season.
- 15 June – Bernard Haitink conducts his final concert in The Netherlands and final concert with a Dutch orchestra, with the Netherlands Philharmonic Orchestra at the Concertgebouw, Amsterdam.
- 16 June – The management of the Baltimore Symphony Orchestra takes industrial action and locks out the orchestra musicians, with effective cessation of payment to the musicians.
- 17 June – The Royal Philharmonic Society (RPS) announces the appointments of Alexander Goehr and Sir David Pountney as honorary members of the RPS.
- 18 June
  - The Song Company announces formally that it has resumed trading and operations, which officially recommenced on 7 June 2019.
  - The mayor of Milan, Giuseppe Sala, announces that Alexander Pereira is to stand down as general director of La Scala at the end of the 2019–2020 season.
- 19 June
  - Opera Theatre of Saint Louis announces the resignation of Stephen Lord as its music director emeritus, following allegations of sexual misconduct against Lord.
  - Michigan Opera Theatre announces the resignation of Stephen Lord as its principal conductor, following allegations of sexual misconduct against Lord.
- 20 June – The Thüringen Philharmonie Gotha-Eisenach announces the appointment of Markus Huber as its next chief conductor, effective with the 2019–2020 season, with an initial contract of 5 seasons.
- 21 June – Various media reports indicate that Teodor Currentzis has resigned as artistic director of the Perm State Opera and Ballet Theater.
- 22 June – The BBC Cardiff Singer of the World 2019 competition results are announced:
  - Main Prize – Andrei Kymach
  - Song Prize – Mingjie Lei
  - Audience Prize – Katie Bray
- 24 June
  - Opera North announces the appointment of Garry Walker as its next music director, effective with the 2020–2021 season.
  - Göteborg Opera announces the appointment of Henning Ruhe as its next artistic director, effective January 2020.
  - The Festspielhaus Baden-Baden announces the appointment of Ursula Koners as its next managing director.
- 25 June – The city of Leipzig announces the nomination of Tobias Wolff as the next Intendant of Oper Leipzig, subject to approval by the Leipzig city council.
- 26 June
  - Opera Rara announces the appointment of Carlo Rizzi as its next artistic director, effective June 2020.
  - The California Symphony announces that Aubrey Bergauer is to stand down as its executive director, as of 15 August 2019.
- 27 June
  - A news report from the Spanish classical music journal Scherzo states that Radu Lupu has announced his retirement from the concert platform.
  - The Chicago Symphony Orchestra announces the appointment of Ken-David Masur as the next principal conductor of the Civic Orchestra of Chicago, effective with the 2019–2020 season.
- 28 June – La Scala and Milan mayor Giuseppe Sala announce the appointment of Dominique Meyer as the next general director of La Scala. Meyer is to join the company in 2020, with an arrangement for Meyer and current general director Alexander Pereira to share joint responsibilities for the company until Pereira's scheduled departure after the 2021 season.
- 1 July
  - The Vienna Symphony Orchestra announces the appointment of Jan Naes as its new Intendant, effective 1 October 2019.
  - The Staatskapelle Dresden announces that Jan Naes is to stand down as its managing director.
  - Rider University announces that it is no longer pursuing the sale of Westminster Choir College to Kaiwen Education.
- 2 July – The Orchestre Régional Avignon-Provence announces the appointment of Débora Waldman as its next music director, the first female conductor to be named to the post, effective 1 September 2020, with an initial contract of 3 years.
- 3 July
  - The Ministerium für Kultur und Wissenschaft des Landes Nordrhein-Westfalen announces the appointment of Barbara Frey as the new Intendantin of the Ruhrtriennale Festival, with an initial contract from 2021 through 2023.
- 8 July – The Singapore Symphony Orchestra announces the appointment of Hans Graf as its new chief conductor, effective with the 2020–2021 season.
- 10 July – A statement from Pope Francis announces that Massimo Palombella has stood down as director of the Choir of the Sistine Chapel, in the wake of accusations of financial fraud on the part of Palombella and of choir manager Michelangelo Nardella.
- 11 July – San Diego Opera announces the appointment of Yves Abel as its new principal conductor, effective with the 2020–2021 season, with an initial contract of 3 years.
- 16 July
  - The National Philharmonic at Strathmore announces plans to cease operations, because of lack of financial support.
  - The Chicago Sinfonietta announces that Jim Hirsch is to conclude his executive directorship of the orchestra on 1 July 2020.
  - Portland Opera announces that Christopher Mattaliano is to stand down as its general director.
- 17 July – Fabio Luisi submits his resignation as music director of the Maggio Musicale Fiorentino, with immediate effect.
- 18 July – The recipients of the 2019 Kennedy Center Honors are announced and include Michael Tilson Thomas.
- 19 July – Karina Canellakis conducts the First Night of the BBC Proms at the Royal Albert Hall, the first female conductor ever to conduct the First Night.
- 24 July
  - The Opéra National de Paris announces the appointment of Alexander Neef as its next general director, effective with the 2021–2022 season.
  - The Canadian Opera Company announces that Alexander Neef is to conclude his tenure as its general director at the close of the 2021–2022 season.
  - Santa Fe Opera announces that Alexander Neef is to stand down as its artistic director in 2021, in the wake of his appointment to the Opéra National de Paris.
- 25 July – The London Philharmonic Orchestra announces the appointment of Edward Gardner as its next principal conductor, effective with the 2021–2022 season, with an initial contract of 5 years.
- 26 July – The Vienna Philharmonic Orchestra awards honorary membership of the orchestra to Herbert Blomstedt.
- 1 August – Opera Theatre of Saint Louis announces the appointments of Patricia Racette as its artistic director of young artist programs, and of Damon Bristo as its new director of artistic administration.
- 6 August – The Metropolitan Opera and James Levine announce settlement of their legal claims against each other, in the wake of accusations of past sexual misconduct against Levine.
- 13 August
  - The Lucerne Symphony Orchestra announces that James Gaffigan is to conclude his chief conductorship of the orchestra at the close of the 2020–2021 season.
  - A news report in the Associated Press details allegations of sexual misconduct by Plácido Domingo against nine women over a period of 3 decades.
- 16 August – The 3. Kammer des Berliner Verwaltungsgerichts (Third Chamber of the Berlin Administrative Court) dismisses a gender-discrimination lawsuit against the Berliner Knabenchor, on behalf of a 9-year-old girl who wished to sing with the choir, but had been denied admission.
- 28 August – The Maggio Musicale Fiorentino announces the appointment of Alexander Pereira as its next superintendent, with an initial contract of 5 years.
- 29 August – The Deutsches Symphonie-Orchester Berlin announces that Alexander Steinbeis is to stand down as its managing director in the summer of 2020.
- 1 September – The Banff International String Quartet Competition announces the Marmen Quartet and the Viano String Quartet as joint winners of the 2019 competition, the first time the festival has awarded first prize to two string quartets.
- 3 September – At the BBC Proms at the Royal Albert Hall, Bernard Haitink conducts his 90th, and final, Proms concert, with the Vienna Philharmonic Orchestra and pianist Emanuel Ax.
- 6 September – At the Lucerne Festival at the KKL, Bernard Haitink conducts his final orchestral concert, with the Vienna Philharmonic Orchestra and pianist Emanuel Ax.
- 9 September – The Kansas City Symphony announces that Michael Stern is to conclude his tenure as its music director at the close of the 2022–2023 season.
- 11 September
  - The BBC National Orchestra of Wales (BBC NOW) announces the appointment of Ryan Bancroft as its next principal conductor, effective with the 2020–2021 season, with an initial contract of 3 years.
  - WDR announces the appointment of Nicolas Fink as the next chief conductor of the WDR Rundfunkchor, effective with the 2020–2021 season.
- 12 September
  - Lyric Opera of Chicago simultaneously announces the appointment of Enrique Mazzola as its next music director, effective with the 2021–2022 season, and the scheduled conclusion of the tenure of Sir Andrew Davis as its music director, effective at the close of the 2020–2021 season.
  - The Boston Symphony Orchestra announces the retirement of Malcolm Lowe as its concertmaster (leader), after 35 years in the post.
- 13 September – Elim Chan conducts the opening night of the 2019–2020 season of the Royal Concertgebouw Orchestra, the first female conductor ever to do so.
- 16 September
  - The BBC announces the appointment of Lisa Tregale as the new director of the BBC National Orchestra of Wales and the BBC National Chorus of Wales, effective in 2020. Tregale is the first woman to be named to the post.
  - The Orchestre Métropolitain announces that Yannick Nézet-Séguin is to continue as its principal conductor on a lifetime contract.
  - Wigmore Hall awards Iestyn Davies the Wigmore Medal, after a concert at Wigmore Hall on his 40th birthday.
  - The Los Angeles Philharmonic announces the resignation of Simon Woods as its president and chief executive officer, with immediate effect.
- 17 September – The Japan Art Association announces Anne-Sophie Mutter as the 31st Praemium Imperiale Laureate in Music.
- 22 September – At the Zondagmatinees in De Paulus Oegstgeest series, the String Quartet No. 2, op. 35, of Leander Schlegel, receives its world premiere, after being lost for decades and being rediscovered at the Netherlands Music Institute in The Hague.
- 23 September
  - The Baltimore Symphony Orchestra ratifies a one-year contract between orchestra management and musicians that reduces the number of paid musician weeks to 40 weeks, with compensation from separate dedicated funds for the 12 non-performing weeks.
  - The Minnesota Orchestra announces the appointment of Jon Kimura Parker as its first-ever Creative Partner for summer programming, with immediate effect.
- 24 September – Following cumulative and multiple historical accusations of sexual harassment against Plácido Domingo, the Metropolitan Opera announces the withdrawal of Domingo from its production of Verdi's Macbeth, the day before its scheduled first night of the season. Domingo indicated his intention no longer to perform at the Metropolitan Opera.
- 25 September – Utah Symphony | Utah Opera announces that chief executive officer and president Paul Meecham is to stand down from the post, effective 30 September 2019.
- 1 October
  - The Los Angeles Philharmonic announces the appointment of Chad Smith as its new president and chief executive officer, with immediate effect.
  - The Ann Arbor Symphony Orchestra names Tyler Rand as its incoming executive director, effective 1 January 2020.
- 2 October – Los Angeles Opera announces the resignation of Plácido Domingo as its general director, following cumulative and multiple historical accusations of sexual harassment against him. The announcement includes his withdrawal from all of his remaining engagements with the company, his most recent then-scheduled US engagements.
- 3 October – The Norrköping Symphony Orchestra announces the appointment of Karl-Heinz Steffens as its next principal conductor and artistic advisor, effective with the 2020–2021 season.
- 4 October – The Copenhagen Opera Festival announces the appointment of Amy Lane as its new festival director, the first woman and the first non-Dane named to the post.
- 5 October – At English National Opera, Lucia Lucas sings the role of Public Opinion in the new ENO production of Orpheus in the Underworld, the first transgender singer to sing a featured role at ENO.
- 6 October – The Metropolitan Opera gives its first-ever Sunday matinee opera performance, of Puccini's Turandot, under its most recent contract.
- 7 October
  - The Teatro San Carlo announces the appointment of Stéphane Lissner as its new Intendant, effective in April 2020.
  - Los Angeles Opera announces the consolidation of its general director post into the posts of president and chief executive, with Christopher Koelsch in the combined posts, with immediate effect, following the resignation of Plácido Domingo as its general director.
- 8 October
  - English National Opera announces the appointment of Annilese Miskimmon as its next artistic director, effective September 2020.
  - Den Norske Opera announces that Annilese Miskimmon is to stand down as its director of opera in the summer of 2020.
- 9 October
  - The Orchestre de Chambre de Paris announces the appointment of Lars Vogt as its next music director, effective with the 2020–2021 season.
  - The Takács Quartet announces the appointment of Richard O'Neill as its new violist, and in parallel, the retirement of Geraldine Walther as its violist, effective June 2020.
- 10 October – WNYC announces its intention to discontinue production and broadcast of its contemporary music programme 'New Sounds', as of the end of 2019.
- 17 October
  - L'Opéra de Québec announces simultaneously that Grégoire Legendre is to stand down as its current artistic director, and that Jean-François Lapointe is to become its next artistic director, effective September 2020.
  - The Ojai Festival announces the appointment of Ara Guzelimian as its next artistic director, effective in 2020.
  - The Toronto Mendelssohn Choir announces the appointment of Anna Kajtar as its next executive director, effective 4 November 2019.
- 18 October – The Staatskapelle Dresden announces the appointment of Adrian Jones as its next orchestra director, effective 13 January 2020.
- 19 October – The Ravinia Festival announces that Welz Kauffman is to stand down as its president and chief executive officer, after the 2020 season.
- 21 October
  - The Opéra Nice Côte d'Azur announces the appointment of Bertrand Rossi as its next general director.
  - Following protests by artists, composers, WNYC listeners and WNYC staff, WNYC reverses its earlier decision of 11 October to discontinue its 'New Sounds' radio programme.
- 22 October – The Opéra National de Lyon announces the appointment of Richard Brunel as its next general director, effective 1 September 2021.
- 24 October
  - SWR announces the appointment of Yuval Weinberg as the next chief conductor of the SWR Vokalensembles (SWR Vocal Ensembles), effective 1 September 2020, with an initial contract of 3 years.
  - Portland Opera announces the promotion of Sue Dixon from interim general director to general director of the company, with immediate effect.
  - Ne(x)tworks gives its final concert, at the Issue Project Room in New York City, before disbanding.
- 28 October – Vancouver Opera announces that Kim Gaynor is to stand down as its general director as of 1 November 2019, and that Tom Wright is to become its interim general director.
- 29 October – The Eastman School of Music announces the cancellation of the planned tour of China by the Eastman Philharmonia, following the denial of visas by China to 3 South Korean members of the student orchestra.
- 30 October – SWR announces Éliane Radigue as the recipient of the Giga-Hertz-Preis 2019.
- 31 October – A news report indicates that Hugo Reyne, the founder of La Simphonie du Marais, is to dissolve the ensemble and to give its final performances in September 2020.
- 5 November – The California Symphony announces the appointment of Lisa Dell as its new executive director, effective 15 November 2019.
- 8 November
  - The Royal Albert Hall announces a new 5-year partnership with the Royal Philharmonic Orchestra as its new associate orchestra for year-round orchestral programmes.
  - Mariss Jansons conducts his final orchestral concert, at Carnegie Hall, with the Bavarian Radio Symphony Orchestra and Diana Damrau.
- 12 November
  - The Orchestre National de France (ONF) announces the appointment of Cristian Măcelaru as its next music director, effective 1 September 2021, with an initial contract of 4 years. In parallel, Emmanuel Krivine is scheduled to stand down as music director of the ONF at the close of the 2020–2021 season.
  - The Slovak Philharmonic announces the appointment of Daniel Raiskin as its next chief conductor, effective with the 2021–2022 season. In parallel, James Judd is scheduled to conclude his chief conductorship of the orchestra as of the close of the 2020–2021 season.
- 13 November – The MDR Leipzig Radio Symphony Orchestra announces the appointment of Dennis Russell Davies as its next chief conductor, effective with the 2020–2021 season, with an initial contract of 4 years.
- 14 November – The city of Leipzig announces Angela Hewitt as the next recipient of the Leipziger Bach-Medaille (Leipzig Bach Medal), the first woman to receive the award.
- 15 November – OPERA San Antonio announces the appointments of E. Loren Meeker as its general and artistic director, and of Francesco Milioto as its music director, with immediate effect.
- 18 November
  - The Staatstheater Kassel announces the appointment of Florian Lutz as its next Intendant, effective with the 2021–2022 season, with an initial contract of 5 years.
  - The Interlochen Center for the Arts announces the appointment of Cristian Măcelaru as the inaugural artistic advisor and principal conductor of the World Youth Symphony Orchestra, based at Interlochen, with immediate effect.
- 19 November – The Ashgabat State Theatre in Turkmenistan presents a staging of Pagliacci, the first opera staging in Turkmenistan since a government-imposed ban on opera productions instigated in 2001.
- 20 November – The BBC Concert Orchestra announces the appointment of Anna-Maria Helsing as its next principal guest conductor, the first female conductor ever named to the post, and the third female conductor to be named to a titled post with a BBC orchestra.
- 21 November
  - The Lucerne Symphony Orchestra announces the appointment of Michael Sanderling as its next chief conductor, effective with the 2021–2022 season.
  - Opera Philadelphia announces the appointment of Tyshawn Sorey as its new composer-in-residence, with immediate effect.
  - Long Beach Opera announces the appointment of Yuval Sharon as its interim artistic director, with responsibility for the company's 2021 season.
- 22 November
  - The Brahms-Gesellschaft Schleswig-Holstein announces Midori as the recipient of the Brahms-Preis (Brahms Prize) 2020.
  - The Orchestra della Toscana announces the appointments of Eva Ollikainen as its next principal conductor, and of Beatrice Venezi and Nil Venditti as its next principal guest conductors, effective with the 2020–2021 season. All three conductors are the first female conductors to be appointed to their respective posts with the orchestra. In parallel, Daniele Rustioni is to conclude his tenure as principal conductor of the orchestra as of the close of the 2019–2020 season.
- 23 November – The Metropolitan Opera presents Akhnaten of Philip Glass as part of its Metropolitan Opera Live in HD series to cinemas, with Karen Kamensek as conductor, the second female conductor ever to be featured in the series.
- 2 December
  - The Staatstheater Cottbus announces the appointment of Alexander Merzyn as its next Generalmusikdirektor, effective with the 2020–2021 season.
  - Lincoln Center and the New York Philharmonic announce new renovation plans for David Geffen Hall, scheduled to commence in 2022.
- 3 December
  - Monte-Carlo Opera announces the appointment of Cecilia Bartoli as its new director, the first woman to be named to the post, effective 1 January 2023.
  - The University of Louisville announces Lei Liang as the winner of the 2020 Grawemeyer Award for Music Composition, for his composition A Thousand Mountains, A Million Streams, premiered in 2018.
  - The San Francisco Symphony announces simultaneously that Sakurako Fisher is to stand down as its president in December 2020, and that Priscilla B. Geeslin is to become the orchestra's new president in December 2020.
  - The board of the Grand Teton Music Festival reinstates musicians Kristen Linfante, Juan de Gomar and Jennifer Ross for the scheduled 2020 festival season, following protests by music director Donald Runnicles, past festival board members, and current festival musicians at attempts to dismiss the three musicians.
- 4 December – The Estonian National Symphony Orchestra announces the appointment of Olari Elts as its next music director and chief conductor, effective with the 2020–2021 season, with an initial contract of 3 seasons. In parallel, Neeme Järvi is scheduled to stand down as music director and chief conductor, and to take the title of honorary conductor for life at the close of the 2019–2020 season.
- 5 December
  - The Hr-Sinfonieorchester announces the appointment of Alain Altinoglu as its next chief conductor, effective with the 2021–2022 season, with an initial contract of 3 seasons. In parallel, Andrés Orozco-Estrada is to conclude his chief conductorship of the orchestra at the close of the 2020–2021 season.
  - San Francisco Opera announces the appointment of Eun Sun Kim as its next music director, the first female conductor ever named to the post, effective 1 August 2021, with an initial contract of 5 years.
  - The University of Cincinnati – College-Conservatory of Music announces the winners of the 2019 Alexander Zemlinsky Prizes for composition:
    - First Prize – Aya Yoshida: double-face
    - Second Prize – Tomasz Skweres: über das farbige Licht der Doppelsterne...
    - Third Prize – Joel Järventausta: Cantus
- 8 December – The world premiere of the opera Orlando, by Olga Neuwirth and Catherine Filloux, takes place at the Vienna State Opera, the first opera by a female composer ever to be presented at the Vienna State Opera.
- 9 December – The Yehudi Menuhin School announces the appointment of Tasmin Little as its new co-president.
- 11 December – The Ministry of Culture, France announces the appointment of Émilie Delorme as the new director of the Conservatoire de Paris, the first woman ever named to the post.
- 13 December – The Grand Teton Music Festival announces the resignation of Andrew Palmer Todd as its executive director and chief executive officer.
- 14 December – The Sydney Symphony Orchestra announces the appointment of Simone Young as its next chief conductor, the first female conductor ever named to the post, effective in 2022, with an initial contract of 3 years.
- 16 December – Symphony Nova Scotia announces the appointment of Holly Mathieson as its next music director, the first female conductor ever named to the post, effective January 2020, with an initial contract of 3 years.
- 17 December
  - The Royal Concertgebouw Orchestra announces the appointment of its current business director, David Bazen, as its interim managing director, effective 1 January 2020.
  - The Orchestra of St. Luke's announces the appointment of Alex Johnston as the new director of the DiMenna Center for Classical Music, effective 6 January 2020.
  - National Sawdust announces that Alex Johnston is to stand down as its general manager in January 2020.
- 18 December
  - Cincinnati Opera announces the appointment of Christopher Milligan as its next general director and chief executive officer, effective 2 March 2020.
  - The Orlando Philharmonic Orchestra announces the appointment of Paul Helfrich as its new executive director, effective February 2020.
  - Never heard live during the composer's lifetime, the world premieres of The Black Tower Variations and Invoking Sonic Stone by Bernard Benoliel take place in The Netherlands at Tivoli Vredenburg, with the ensemble Insomnio under the direction of Ulrich Pöhl.
- 20 December – The Orchestre Royal de Chambre de Wallonie announces the appointment of Vahan Mardirossian as its next music director, effective 1 January 2020, with an initial contract of 5 years through 31 December 2024.
- 21 December – The Opéra national du Rhin announces the appointment of Alain Ferroux as its next general director, effective January 2020.
- 27 December – UK New Year's Honours 2020:
  - Humphrey Burton is made a Knight Bachelor.
  - Timothy Walker and Errollyn Wallen are each made a Commander of the Order of British Empire.
  - Judith Bingham and Nicola Killean are each made an Officer of the Order of the British Empire.
  - Helen Grime, Sheku Kanneh-Mason, and Charles Kennard are each made a Member of the Order of the British Empire.
- 28 December – The governor general of Canada announces the appointments of Eric Friesen and alcides lanza each as a Member of the Order of Canada.
- 31 December
  - The Thomaskirche, Leipzig suffers severe damage to 25 stained glass panes dating from the 19th and 20th centuries.
  - Martin Baker resigns as Master of Music at Westminster Cathedral, in protest at changes to the Westminster Cathedral Choir School timetable and its potential effects on the school's music programme.

== New works ==
The following composers' works were composed, premiered, or published this year, as noted in the citation.

=== A ===
- John Adams – Must the Devil Have All the Good Tunes? (piano concerto)
- Thomas Adès – Concerto for Piano and Orchestra
- Kalevi Aho – Contribution to Pictured Within: Birthday Variations for M.C.B. (New 'Enigma' Variations)
- Patricia Alessandrini – Ada's Song
- Dieter Ammann – Piano Concerto
- Mark Andre – rwh 1
- Lera Auerbach – Eve's Lament – O Flowers, That Never Will Grow

=== B ===
- Gerald Barry – Viola Concerto
- Jeff Beal (music), Della Holsinger and Joan Beal (text) – The Paper Lined Shack
- Sally Beamish
  - Nine Fragments (for string quartet)
  - Contribution to Pictured Within: Birthday Variations for M.C.B. (New 'Enigma' Variations)
- Lembit Beecher – Say Home
- Michael Berkeley – Epitaphs of War
- Sir Harrison Birtwistle
  - Duet for 8 Strings (for viola and cello)
  - when falling asleep
  - Contribution to Pictured Within: Birthday Variations for M.C.B. (New 'Enigma' Variations)
- Daniel Bjarnason – From Space I saw Earth
- Richard Blackford – Contribution to Pictured Within: Birthday Variations for M.C.B. (New 'Enigma' Variations)
- Mark David Boden – Descent
- Seóirse Bodley – Love After Chagall
- Fabrice Bollon – Dogmatic Pleasures: 'Scales and Chords', 'Marriage in B Flat Major'
- Johannes Boris Borowski – Allein
- David Bruce – Out of Hours
- Gavin Bryars
  - A Native Hill
  - Contribution to Pictured Within: Birthday Variations for M.C.B. (New 'Enigma' Variations)
- Linda Buckley – Oscillate
- Rodrigo Bussad – Kodama

=== C ===
- Jay Capperauld – Egalitair
- John Casken – Madonna of Silence (Trombone Concerto)
- Richard Causton – Ik zeg: NU
- Anne Cawrse – Flame and Shadow (text by Sara Teasdale)
- Deborah Cheetham
  - Eumeralla: a war requiem for peace
  - Gulaga
- Yekaterina Chemberdzhi – Double Concerto for violin, piano, string orchestra and percussion
- Phyllis Chen – Roots of Interior
- Unsuk Chin – Frontispiece
- George S. Clinton – The Rose of Sonora (violin concerto)
- Anna Clyne
  - Snake & Ladder
  - Sound and Fury
- Timothy Cooper – ...shadows that in darkness dwell...
- George Crumb – KRONOS-KRYPTOS
- Sebastian Currier
  - Eleven Moons
  - Violin Concerto
  - Ghost Trio

=== D ===
- Brett Dean
  - String Quartet No 3
  - Contribution to Pictured Within: Birthday Variations for M.C.B. (New 'Enigma' Variations)
- Paul Dean – Clarinet Concerto
- Jan-Peter de Graaff – Jutters
- David Del Tredici – Monsters
- Adrián Demoč – Neha (Tenderness)
- Robin de Raaff – Violin Concerto No. 2 ('North Atlantic Light')
- Bryce Dessner – Triptych (Eyes of One on Another)
- Samuel Dickenson – Returning to the Sand
- Zosha Di Castri – Long Is The Journey – Short Is The Memory
- Jonathan Dove
  - Accordion Concerto ('Northern Lights')
  - We Are One Fire
- Richard Dubugnon – Helvetia II. Via Lemanica
- Melissa Dunphy – Waves of Gallipoli
- David Dzubay – String Quartet No. 2
- Du Yun and Khaled Jarrar – Where We Lost Our Shadows

=== E ===
- George Ellis (music) and Justine Clarke (text) – Mimi's Symphony
- Thorsten Encke – Clarinet Concerto

=== F ===
- Sebastian Fagerlund – Nomade
- David Fennessy – The Ground
- Samantha Fernando – Breathing Space
- Shiva Feshareki – Perpetual Motion
- Jürg Frey – Elemental Realities (for orchestra)
- Dai Fujikura – Contribution to Pictured Within: Birthday Variations for M.C.B. (New 'Enigma' Variations)

=== G ===
- Álvaro Gallegos – Irlanda
- Herschel Garfein (music) and KC Trommer (texts) – Three Rides
- Stacy Garrop – Shiva Dances
- Arne Gieshoff – Burr
- Gina Gillie – Philharmonic Fanfare
- Philip Glass
  - Symphony No 12 ('Lodger', after David Bowie)
  - King Lear Overture
- Geoffrey Gordon – Thorn
- Konstantia Gourzi – Call of the Bees
- Iain Grandage – Orphée (English horn concerto)
- Philip Grange – Violin Concerto
- Jonny Greenwood – Horror vacui
- Helen Grime – Percussion Concerto
- Matthew Grouse – Daily Rituals

=== H ===
- Georg Friedrich Haas – Iguazú superior, antes de descender por la Garganta del Diablo
- Saed Haddad – Melancholie (for chromatic harmonica and orchestra)
- Robin Haigh – Grin
- Juliana Hall
  - Godiva (Caitlin Vincent, text)
  - Tornado (Kathleen Kelly, text)
- Jake Heggie – Full Circle Fifty
- Matouš Hejl – Crossings
- Wim Henderickx – Contribution to Pictured Within: Birthday Variations for M.C.B. (New 'Enigma' Variations)
- Peter Henderson – Sun Valley: Sunset, Moonrise, and Milky Way
- Sarah Hennies – Reservoir 2: Intrusion
- Gavin Higgins – The Book of Miracles (Trombone Concerto)
- Anders Hillborg – Sound Atlas
- Robin Holloway – Phaeton's Journey: Son of the Sun (trumpet concerto)
- Dani Howard
  - Gates of Spring
  - Coalescence
- Emily Howard
  - The Anvil – An elegy for Peterloo (Michael Symmons Roberts, text)
  - Antisphere
  - 'But then, what are these numbers?'

=== J ===
- Pierre Jalbert – Air in Motion
- Mårten Jansson (music) and Charles Anthony Silvestri (text) – Hope
- Maya Miro Johnson – "wherever you go, there you are"

=== K ===
- Gordon Kampe
  - Il cappello magico (saxophone concerto)
  - Remember Me
- Daniel Kellogg – The Golden Spike
- Aaron Jay Kernis – Venit Illuminatio
- Daniel Kidane – Woke
- Graeme Koehne – Socrates Garden
- Nicholas Korth – Harmoniae Naturales VI
- Hanna Kulenty – Flute Concerto No 3

=== L ===
- Sophie Lacaze – Après avoir contemplé la lune, for orchestra
- Felipe Lara – Ó, for eight amplified singers, two choirs, chamber orchestra and pre-recorded sounds
- James Ledger – Viola Concerto
- Joanna Lee – 'At this man's hand'
- Jonathan Leshnoff – Suite for Cello, Strings and Timpani
- Lowell Liebermann – Five Songs on Poems by Jean Starr Untermeyer
- Catherine Likhuta
  - Rituals of Heartland
  - Dreams of a Wombat
- Nicole Lizée – Sepulchre
- Hannibal Lokumbe – Healing Tones
- Jimmy López
  - Dreamers (Nilo Cruz, text)
  - Aurora (violin concerto)
- Luca Luciano – Clarinet Sonata No. 8
- David Ludwig (music) and Ray Owen (texts) – Songs of the Spirit of Turpentine

=== M ===
- Sky Macklay – Swarm Collecting
- Sir James MacMillan – Symphony No 5 ('Le grand Inconnu')
- Stuart MacRae
  - Courante
  - Prometheus Symphony
- Joanna Marsh – O Magnum Mysterium
- Grace-Evangeline Mason – Midnight Spires
- James Matheson – Pessoa Songs
- Colin Matthews
  - Octet
  - Contribution to Pictured Within: Birthday Variations for M.C.B. (New 'Enigma' Variations)
- Liam Mattison – Violet
- Cathy Millken – WEAVE
- Alex Mills – Crossing Over
- Gabriela Montero – My Venezuelan childhood portraits
- Kate Moore – String Quartet No 3 (Cicadidae)
- Philip Moore – The angel Gabriel
- Nico Muhly – Tambourin
- Jeffrey Mumford – Within Diffuse Echoes
- Thea Musgrave – Trumpet Concerto

=== N ===
- Nicolas Namoradze – Arabesque
- Sergei Newski – 18 Episodes for Orchestra
- Akira Nishimura – Azure Dragon (for string quartet)

=== O ===
- Matthew Olyver – Concerto in Clockwork

=== P ===
- Martijn Padding – Three Birthday Pieces for Louis Andriessen
- Anthony Payne – Contribution to Pictured Within: Birthday Variations for M.C.B. (New 'Enigma' Variations)
- Michael Pelzel – Mysterious Benares Bells (for orchestra and electronics)
- Camille Pépin – Laniakea
- John Pickard – Contribution to Pictured Within: Birthday Variations for M.C.B. (New 'Enigma' Variations)
- Tom Poster – The Turning Year
- Sophya Polevaya – Spellbound Tableaux
- André Previn and Tom Stoppard (realised by David Fetherolf) – Penelope
- Hilary Purrington – Harp of Nerves (for guitar and orchestra)
- Kevin Puts
  - The Brightness of Light (text based on correspondence of Georgia O'Keeffe and Alfred Stieglitz)
  - Virelai (after Guillaume de Machaut)

=== R ===
- Bernard Rands – DREAM
- Emanuel Reichert-Lübbert – Diplomatie II
- Eva Reiter – WÄCHTER (for contrabassoon and pipe orchestra)
- Ailie Robertson – Chaconne
- Christopher Rouse – Symphony No. 6 (his final composition)
- Kareem Roustom – Turn to the World: A Whitman Cantata

=== S ===
- Marc Sabat – Partite Requiem
- Esa-Pekka Salonen – Gemini
- David Sawer – Contribution to Pictured Within: Birthday Variations for M.C.B. (New 'Enigma' Variations)
- Adam Schoenberg – Losing Earth (percussion concerto)
- Nina Šenk – T. E. R. R. A. II
- Heather Shannon
  - Ricochet
  - Ricochet from a Distance
- Caroline Shaw – Watermark (for piano and orchestra)
- Matthew Shlomowitz – Glücklich, Glücklich, Freude, Freude (for keyboard instruments and orchestra)
- Carmel Smickersgill – Charcoal
- Gabriella Smith – f(x) = sin²x – 1/x
- Simon Steen-Andersen – TRIO (for big band, chorus, orchestra, and video)
- James Stephenson – Bass Trombone Concerto
- Lisa Streich – Laster

=== T ===
- Joby Talbot – A Sheen of Dew on Flowers
- Iris ter Schiphorst – Contribution to Pictured Within: Birthday Variations for M.C.B. (New 'Enigma' Variations)
- Anna S. Þorvaldsdóttir – Enigma (String Quartet No 1)
- George Tsontakis – Violin Concerto No. 3
- Calliope Tsoupaki
  - Pour Notre-Dame
  - Bosch Requiem – Liknon
- Mark-Anthony Turnage
  - Massarosa (for bassoon and string quartet)
  - Refugee (for tenor and chamber orchestra; texts by Emily Dickinson, Benjamin Zephaniah, W.H. Auden, and Brian Bilson)

=== V ===
- Bram van Camp – Träume (texts by Rainer Maria Rilke and Theodor Storm)
- Michel van der Aa – akin (double concerto for violin, cello and orchestra)
- Rick van Veldhuizen – cōnflārī
- Jana Vöröšová – Písně Vrbovýho (Orpingalik's Songs)

=== W ===
- Freya Waley-Cohen
  - Naiad
  - Conjure (for string trio)
- Errollyn Wallen – This Frame Is Part of the Painting
- Huw Watkins – The Moon
- Judith Weir
  - The Prelude
  - Contribution to Pictured Within: Birthday Variations for M.C.B. (New 'Enigma' Variations)
- Jessica Wells – Night Parrot
- Matthew Whiteside
  - Quartet No. 5
  - Quartet No. 6
  - Rama
- Ryan Wigglesworth – Piano Concerto
- Scott Wilson – À Mezza Voce
- Stevie Wishart – The Last Dance? (a baroque tango)
- Julia Wolfe – Fire in My Mouth
- John Woolrich – A Book of Inventions
- Alex Woolf – Fairfield Fanfare

=== Y ===
- Nina C. Young – The Glow that Illuminates, the Glare that Obscures

=== Z ===
- Pamela Z – Louder, Warmer, Denser
- Lidia Zielińska – Klangor (for orchestra)
- Ellen Taaffe Zwilich – Viva! Boston Musica Viva

== New operas ==
- Hans Abrahamsen and Henrik Engelbrecht – Snedronningen
- Iain Bell
  - Stonewall (Mark Campbell, text)
  - The Women of Whitechapel (Emma Jenkins, text)
- Jonathan Berger – Leonardo
- Nicolas Lell Benavides and Marella Martin Koch – Pepito
- Terence Blanchard and Kasi Lemmons – Fire Shut Up in My Bones
- Bryan Blaskie and Seth Christenfeld – The Stonewall Operas – Outside
- Matt Boehler and Laura Barati – 75 Miles
- Benet Casablancas and Rafael Argullol – L'enigma de Lea
- Brian Cavanagh-Strong and Ben Bonnema – The Stonewall Operas – The Pomada Inn
- Chaya Czernowin – Heart Chamber
- Kevin Cummines and Shoshana Greenberg – The Stonewall Operas – The Community
- Aftab Darvishi and Miranda Lakerveld – Turan Dokht
- Anthony Davis and Richard Wesley – The Central Park Five
- Raymond Deane – Vagabones
- Leo Dick and Blanka Rádóczy – Antigone-Tribunal
- Moritz Eggert (music), Barrie Kosky and Ulrich Lenz (libretto) – M – Eine Stadt sucht einen Mörder
- Francesco Filidei and Joël Pommerat – L'Inondation
- Beat Furrer and Händl Klaus – Violetter Schnee
- Detlev Glanert and Hans-Ulrich Treichel – Oceane
- Elliott Gyger and Pierce Wilcox – Oscar and Lucinda (after Peter Carey's 1988 novel)
- Jake Heggie and Gene Scheer – If I Were You
- Gavin Higgins and Francesca Simon – The Monstrous Child
- Dani Howard (music), Zoe Palmer and Rebecca Hurst (libretto) – Robin Hood
- Molly Joyce and James Kennedy – Relapse
- Elena Kats-Chernin
  - Whiteley (Justin Fleming, text)
  - Jim Knopf und Lukas der Lokomotivführer (Susanne Felicitas Wolf, text)
- David Lang – prisoner of the state
- Hannah Lash – Desire
- Stuart MacRae and Louise Welsh – Anthropocene
- Adam Maor and Yonatan Levy – The Sleeping Thousand
- Elisabeth Naske – Was ist los bei den Enakos?
- Olga Neuwirth (music), Catherine Filloux and Olga Neuwirth (libretto) – Orlando
- Tarik O'Regan and John Caird – The Phoenix
- Gabriel Prokofiev and David Pountney – Elizabetta
- TJ Rubin and Deepali Gupta – Nightlife
- Poul Ruders (music), David Starobin and Becky Starobin (libretto) – The Thirteenth Child
- Anno Schreier and Kerstin Maria Pöhler – Schade, dass sie eine Hure war
- Jeanine Tesori and Tazewell Thompson - Blue
- Augusta Read Thomas and Leslie Dunton-Downer – Sweet Potato Kicks the Sun
- Francine Trester – Florence Comes Home
- Michel van der Aa – Eight
- Philip Venables and Ted Huffman – Denis & Katya
- Michael Wertmüller and Dea Loher – Diodati. Unendlich
- Michi Wiancko and Deborah Brevoort – Murasaki's Moon
- Jörg Widmann and Peter Sloterdijk – Babylon (revised version of original 2012 opera)

== Albums ==
- Messa per Rossini
- Julia Kent – Temporal
- George Antheil – Archipelago / Symphony No 3 / Symphony No 6 / Hot-Time Dance / Spectre of the Rose Waltz
- Franz Liszt: Sardanapalo (first recording) / Mazeppa
- Max Bruch (music) and Emanuel Geibel (libretto) – Die Loreley (first complete recording)
- Bernard Rands – Chains Like the Sea / Cello Concerto / Danza Petrificada
- Michael Tippett – Symphony in B♭ (first recording) / Symphonies Nos. 3 and 4
- Grace Williams – Chamber Works
- Women of Note: A Century of Australian Composers
- Jean Barraqué – Espaces imaginaires (oeuvres pour piano)
- Esa-Pekka Salonen – Cello Concerto
- Benet Casablancas – 7 Haikus / Six Glosses on texts by Cees Nooteboom / Pastorale. Concertino for saxo alt & ensemble / Two pieces for clarinet and piano/ Albumblätt für Arriaga / Ricercare para Chillida, for cello solo
- Othmar Schoeck – Das Schloß Dürande (first recording; revised libretto by Francesco Micieli)
- Josef Mysliveček – Complete Music for Keyboard (first integral recording)
- Swan Hennessy – Complete String Quartets and String Trio, world premier recordings
- Stefan Prins – Augmented
- Johann Sebastian Bach – Bach to the Future (Olivier Latry, organ; the last recording made at Notre-Dame de Paris before the Notre-Dame fire)
- Giorgio Netti – necessità d'interrogare il cielo
- Lisa Streich – Augenlieder
- Mieczysław Weinberg – Symphonies Nos. 2 and 21 (City of Birmingham Symphony Orchestra, Kremerata Baltica; Mirga Gražinytė-Tyla, conductor; her first DG recording)
- Kurt Sander – The Divine Liturgy of St. John Chrysostom
- American Rapture: Jennifer Higdon – Harp Concerto (first recording), Samuel Barber – Symphony No. 1, Patrick Harlin – Rapture (first recording)
- Avner Dorman – Letters from Gettysburg
- Laura Kaminsky (music), Mark Campbell and Kimberly Reed (libretto) – As One (first recording)
- Sir George Benjamin and Martin Crimp – Lessons in Love and Violence (first recording)
- Pierluigi Billone – FACE / PHACE
- Antón García Abril – Six Partitas (Hilary Hahn, violin)
- Kaija Saariaho – True Fire / Trans / Ciel d'hiver
- Carl Hockh, Violin Sonatas (Mikołaj Zgółka, Jarosław Thiel, Aleksandra Rupocińska)
- Antony Panteras – Collected Works Vol. II (2005–2018)
- Antonio Salieri and Pierre Beaumarchais – Tarare (first recording)
- Charles Gounod and Adolphe d'Ennery – Le tribut de Zamora (first recording)
- Hans Gál and Karl Michael von Levetzow – Das Lied der Nacht (first recording)
- Thomas Arne (music) and William Congreve (text) – The Judgment of Paris (first recording of reconstructed work)
- Poul Ruders (music), David Starobin and Becky Starobin (libretto) – The Thirteenth Child (first recording)
- John Luther Adams – Become Desert (first recording)
- Wynton Marsalis
  - Violin Concerto / Fiddle Dance Suite (first recordings)
  - Symphony No 3 ('Swing Symphony'; first recording)
- Heinz Holliger, György Kurtág – Zwiegespräche
- Joseph Phibbs – Clarinet Concerto (first recording)
- Romance: The Piano Music of Clara Schumann – Piano Concerto et al. (Isata Kanneh-Mason; Decca Classics)
- Mark Andre – hij 1 / hij 2 (Wergo)
- Luke Bedford – Through His Teeth
- Christopher Cerrone – The Pieces That Fall to Earth
- Pauline Viardot (music) and Ivan Turgenev (libretto) – Le Dernier Sorcier (first recording)
- Andrew Anderson – Piano Quartets Nos 1 and 2 (Navona)
- Ellen Reid (music) and Roxie Perkins (libretto) – p r i s m (first recording)
- John Harbison – Requiem
- Pascal Dusapin (music) and Beate Haeckl (libretto) – Penthesilea (first recording)
- Elena Kats-Chernin – The Little Green Road to Fairyland, with Katie Noonan
- Morton Feldman: Piano
- Julia Wolfe – Fire in My Mouth (first recording)
- Bruckner – Symphony No. 6 (first recording of new Urtext edition by Benjamin-Gunnar Cohrs; London Symphony Orchestra / Sir Simon Rattle) (LSO Live)
- Camille Saint-Saëns – Ascanio (first recording of reconstructed edition)
- Chaya Czernowin, Anna Thorvaldsdottir, Mirela Ivičević, Liza Lim, Rebecca Saunders – Speak, Be Silent (Riot Ensemble)
- Zosha Di Castri — Tachitipo et al. (Ekmeles, ICE, JACK Quartet, Talea Ensemble, Yarn/Wire, Julia Den Boer)
- Andrew Norman – Sustain
- Qasim Naqvi, Lisa Bielawa, Du Yun, Tyshawn Sorey, Nina Young, Wang Lu, Vijay Iyer, Missy Mazzoli – Limitless (Jennifer Koh, violin)
- Peter Eötvös – Halleluja / Alle Vittime Senza Nome
- Allan Segall, Bart Spaan, Jan Vriend, Jan-Peter de Graaff, Ned McGowan, Piet-Jan van Rossum – Halo (contemporary Dutch compositions for piccolo and piano) (Ilonka Kolthof, piccolo, and Ralph van Raat, piano)
- Olga Neuwirth – ...miramondo multiplo... / Remnants of Songs, Masaot / Clocks without Hands (Ingo Metzmacher / Gustav Mahler Youth Orchestra / Håkan Hardenberger; Susanna Mälkki / ORF Radio Symphony / Antoine Tamestit; Daniel Harding / Vienna Philharmonic) (Kairos)
- Pelle Gudmundsen-Holmgreen – For Violin and Orchestra / A.G. Madsen – Nachtmusik (Danish National Symphony / Ryan Bancroft / Nicholas Collon / Christine Åstrand / Per Salo) (Da Capo)
- Avet Terterian – Symphonies Nos. 3 and 4 (Bournemouth Symphony Orchestra / Kirill Karabits) (Chandos)
- Martinů – Divadlo za bránou (1956 Czech Radio recording; first commercial release)
- Matthew Whiteside – Entangled (the Aurea Quartet)

== Deaths ==
- 1 January – Joan Guinjoan, Spanish composer and pianist, 87
- 3 January – Donald Froud, British orchestral administrator and French horn player, and first general manager of the Ulster Orchestra, 86
- 7 January – John Joubert, South Africa-born British composer, 91
- 10 January – Theo Adam, German bass-baritone, 92
- 14 January – Rüdiger Trantow, German composer, conductor and pedagogue, 93
- 21 January – Eva Bernáthová, Czech pianist, 96
- 26 January – Jean Guillou, French composer, organist and pianist, 88
- 27 January – Wilma Lipp, Austrian operatic soprano, 93
- 28 January – Noel Rawsthorne, British organist, 89
- 29 January – Sanford Sylvan, American baritone, 65
- 31 January – Francesco Bissolotti, Italian violin maker/luthier and teacher, 89
- 6 February – Gerald English, British tenor, 93
- 13 February – Hans Stadlmair, German conductor and composer, 89
- 18 February – Mary Ann Feldman, American classical music programme annotator and speaker for the Minnesota Orchestra, 85
- 20 February – Dominick Argento, American composer, 91
- 21 February
  - Hilde Zadek, German-born soprano active in Austria, 101
  - Jean-Christophe Benoît, French baritone, 93
- 25 February – Hans Kox, Dutch composer, 88
- 27 February
  - Jerry Horner, American violist and past member of the Fine Arts Quartet, 83
  - Viktor Moučka, Czech cellist and last founding member of the Vlach Quartet, 93
- 28 February – André Previn, German-born American conductor, composer, and pianist, 89
- 1 March – Joseph Flummerfelt, American choral conductor, 82
- 3 March
  - Peter Hurford, British organist, choir director, and composer, 88
  - Dominic Gregorio, Canadian choral conductor, 41
- 6 March – Grayston Burgess, English countertenor and conductor, 86
- 8 March
  - Michael Gielen, Austrian conductor, 91
  - George Neikrug, American cellist and university pedagogue, 100
- 16 March – Hans-Wolfgang Dünschede, German orchestral flautist and piccolo player, 69
- 17 March
  - Wolfgang Meyer, German clarinetist, 63
  - Laura Bruton, American orchestral violinist and pedagogue, 59
- 21 March – James Winn, American humanities scholar and amateur flautist, 71
- 22 March – Victor Hochhauser, Czechoslovakia-born British impresario, 95
- 25 March
  - Luis Biava, American violinist, conductor, and university pedagogue, 85
  - Anatolijus Šenderovas, Lithuanian composer, 73
- 26 March – Heinz Winbeck, German composer, 73
- 29 March – Joshua Hecht, American-born bass and vocal coach active in Australia, 91
- 1 April – Vladimir Orloff, Ukraine-born cellist resident in Canada, 90
- 4 April – Marilyn Mason, American concert organist and university pedagogue, 93
- 5 April
  - Sam Pilafian, American tuba player and founding member of the Empire Brass Quintet, 69
  - Pavel Farkas, Czech-born orchestral violinist resident in the United States, 77
- 6 April – Yu Zhao Gu, China-born American orchestral violinist, 60
- 8 April – Sue Revill, British classical record company financial administrator, 63
- 16 April – Jörg Demus, Austrian pianist, 90
- 22 April
  - Heather Harper, British soprano, 88
  - Deborah Cook, American soprano, 80
- 24 April – Françoise Barrière, French electro-acoustic composer, 74
- 7 May – Georg Katzer, German electro-acoustic composer, 84
- 9 May – Arif Malikov, Azerbaijani composer, People's Artist of the USSR (1986), 85
- 11 May – James Arkatov, Russia-born American cellist and founder of the Los Angeles Chamber Orchestra, 98
- 17 May – Patrick Wedd, Canadian composer, organist, and conductor, 71
- 20 May – Mira Zakai, Israeli contralto, 76
- 22 May – François-René Tranchefort, French musicologist, 86
- 25 May – Alice Schoenfeld, Yugoslavia-born American violinist and pedagogue, 98
- 30 May – Eva Kleinitz, German opera administrator, 47
- 4 June – Roger Covell, Australian musicologist, 88
- 7 June – Yuri Sheykhet, Russian orchestral violinist resident in the US, 85
- 8 June – Lazar Gosman, Russia-born violinist resident in America, 93
- 10 June
  - Ib Nørholm, Danish composer and organist, 88
  - Sven-David Sandström, Swedish composer, 76
- 15 June
  - Franco Zeffirelli, Italian opera, theatre, and film director, 96
  - Michael Jaffee, American lutenist, guitarist, and co-founder of the Waverly Consort, 81
- 19 June – Jack Renner, American classical recording engineer and co-founder of Telarc Records, 84
- 23 June – Spiro Malas, American bass, 86
- 27 June – Louis Thiry, French organist and composer, 84
- 1 July – Bogusław Schaeffer, Polish composer, 90
- 2 July
  - Michael Colgrass, American composer, 87
  - William Dooley, American bass-baritone, 86
- 4 July – Vivien Perlis, American musicologist and music historian, 91
- 9 July – Aaron Rosand, American concert violinist, 92
- 12 July
  - Robert Orth, American baritone, 72
  - Joseph Rouleau, French-Canadian bass, 90
- 15 July
  - Vincent Pavesi, French bass, 49
  - Hugh Southern, American arts administrator, 87
- 22 July
  - Hansgeorg Schmeiser, Austrian flautist and pedagogue, 63
  - Allan Ulrich, American arts and classical music critic, 78
- 25 July
  - Anner Bylsma, Dutch cellist, 85
  - M. Owen Lee, American-born Roman Catholic priest, scholar, and opera commentator, 89
  - Walter Homburger, Canadian arts administrator and impresario, 95
- 26 July – Christian Stadelmann, German orchestral violinist and section leader of the Berlin Philharmonic Orchestra, 60
- 1 August
  - Theo van Wijngaarden, Dutch orchestral staff member and stagehand, 65
  - Barrington Pheloung, Australian composer, 65
- 15 August – Julien Gauthier, Canadian composer, 44
- 17 August – Rosemary Kuhlmann, American mezzo-soprano, 97
- 18 August – Helmuth Froschauer, Austrian conductor, 85
- 23 August – Mario Davidovsky, American composer, 85
- 26 August – Richard Conrad, American opera singer and impresario, 84
- 1 September – Gagik Hovunts, Armenian composer, 89
- 7 September – Roger Boutry, French composer, pianist, and music administrator, 87
- 17 September – Dina Ugorskaja, Russian-born pianist active in Germany, 46
- 21 September – Christopher Rouse, American composer, 70
- 25 September – Paul Badura-Skoda, Austrian pianist and music scholar, 91
- 26 September
  - Martin Wesley-Smith, Australian composer, 74
  - Quita Chavez, British classical publications manager, 100
  - Myron Bloom, American orchestral French horn player and past principal French horn of The Cleveland Orchestra, 93
- 29 September – Martin Bernheimer, American classical music and opera critic, 83
- 30 September – Jessye Norman, American soprano, 74
- 2 October – Giya Kancheli, Georgian composer, 84
- 5 October – Marcello Giordani, Italian tenor, 56
- 10 October – Richard Ortner, American classical music education administrator, 71
- 13 October – Theo Verbey, Dutch composer, 60
- 14 October – Leyna Gabriele, American soprano, 95
- 16 October – Kees Olthuis, Dutch bassoonist and past bassoonist of the Royal Concertgebouw Orchestra, 78
- 17 October – Márta Kurtág, Hungarian pianist, teacher, and muse to her husband György Kurtág, 92
- 18 October – Wolf Erichson, German recording producer, 91
- 20 October – Herbert Chappell, British composer and classical music television programme producer, 85
- 22 October
  - Břetislav Novotný, Czech violinist, 95
  - Rolando Panerai, Italian baritone, 95
  - Hans Zender, German composer and conductor, 82
  - Raymond Leppard, UK-born conductor and scholar resident in the US, 92
- 23 October
  - Hansheinz Schneeberger, Swiss violinist, 93
  - Mika Shigematsu, Japanese mezzo-soprano
- 28 October
  - Zoltán Jeney, Hungarian composer, 76
  - Jitka Šuranská, Czech singer and violinist, 41
- 3 November – Friedemann Layer, Austrian conductor, 78
- 6 November – John Curro, Australian conductor and founder of Queensland Youth Orchestras, 86
- 10 November – Werner Andreas Albert, German conductor, 84
- 12 November
  - Janice Thomson, American oboist, 62
  - Zoran Hristić, Serbian composer, 81
- 19 November – Rémy Stricker, French musicologist, 83
- 22 November – Sir Stephen Cleobury, British choral conductor, 70
- 27 November – Sir Jonathan Miller, British theatre and opera director, satirist, and physician, 85
- 28 November – Christopher Finzi, British conductor and son of Gerald Finzi, 85
- 29 November – Ruth Anderson, American electronic music composer and academic, 91
- 1 December – Mariss Jansons, Latvian conductor, 76
- 7 December – Simon Streatfeild, British conductor resident in Canada, 90
- 12 December – Dalton Baldwin, American pianist and lieder accompanist, 87
- 17 December – László Heltay, Hungarian-born choral conductor active in the UK, 89
- 18 December – Abbey Simon, American pianist, 99
- 19 December – Michael Grebanier, American orchestral cellist and principal cello of the San Francisco Symphony, 82
- 20 December – Robert Creech, Canadian horn player and music pedagogue, 91
- 25 December – Peter Schreier, German tenor and conductor, 84
- 26 December – Toos Onderdenwijngaard, Dutch pianist, 93
- 28 December – Thanos Mikroutsikos, Greek composer, 72
- 29 December – Susanne Beer, German-born orchestral cellist resident in the United Kingdom and principal cello of the London Philharmonic Orchestra, 52
- 30 December
  - Harry Kupfer, German opera director, 84
  - Petr Wagner, Czech viola da gamba player, 50

== Major awards ==
- 2019 Pulitzer Prize Winner in Music: Ellen Reid – p r i s m (libretto by Roxie Perkins)

=== Grammy Awards ===
- Best Chamber Music/Small Ensemble Performance: Laurie Anderson – Landfall; Laurie Anderson and the Kronos Quartet (Nonesuch)
- Best Choral Performance: Lansing McLoskey – Zealot Canticles; The Crossing; Donald Nally, conductor (Innova Recordings)
- Best Classical Compendium: Kenneth Fuchs – Piano Concerto ('Spiritualist') / Poems Of Life / Glacier / Rush; Jeffrey Biegel, Timothy McAllister, D.J. Sparr, Aryeh Nussbaum Cohen; London Symphony Orchestra; JoAnn Falletta, conductor (Naxos)
- Best Classical Instrumental Solo: Aaron Jay Kernis, James Newton Howard – Violin Concertos / Bramwell Tovey – Stream of Light; James Ehnes; Seattle Symphony; Ludovic Morlot, conductor / Detroit Symphony Orchestra; Cristian Măcelaru, conductor (Onyx)
- Best Contemporary Classical Composition: Aaron Jay Kernis – Violin Concerto; James Ehnes; Seattle Symphony; Ludovic Morlot, conductor (Onyx)
- Best Classical Solo Vocal Album: Songs of Orpheus; Karim Sulayman; Apollo's Fire (Avie Records)
- Best Opera Recording: Mason Bates – The (R)evolution Of Steve Jobs; Sasha Cooke, Jessica E. Jones, Edward Parks, Garrett Sorenson, Wei Wu; Michael Christie, conductor; The Santa Fe Opera Orchestra
- Best Engineered Album, Classical: Shostakovich – Symphonies No. 4 and 11; Boston Symphony Orchestra; Andris Nelsons, conductor (Deutsche Grammophon)
- Best Orchestral Performance: Shostakovich – Symphonies No. 4 and 11; Boston Symphony Orchestra; Andris Nelsons, conductor (Deutsche Grammophon)
- Producer of the Year, Classical: Blanton Alspaugh

=== Victoires de la musique classique ===
- Victoire d'honneur: Lang Lang
- Recording of the Year: Berlioz – Les Troyens; Joyce DiDonato, Michael Spyres, Marie-Nicole Lemieux, Stéphane Degout, Marianne Crebassa et al., Rhine Opera Chorus, Badischer Staatsopernchor, Strasbourg Philharmonic Choir, Strasbourg Philharmonic Orchestra; John Nelson, conductor (Erato)
- Artiste Lyrique: Stéphane Degout
- Instrumental soloist: Nicholas Angelich
- Composer: Guillaume Connesson
- Révélation Artiste Lyrique – Eléonore Pancrazi
- Révélation Soliste Instrumental – Thibaut Garcia

=== Royal Philharmonic Society Awards ===
- RPS Gold Medal: Sofia Gubaidulina
- Chamber-Scale Composition: Tansy Davies – Cave
- Concert Series & Events: The Cumnock Tryst
- Conductor: Mirga Gražinytė-Tyla
- Ensemble – Aurora Orchestra
- Gamechanger: Chineke!
- Impact: BSO Change Makers and Resound
- Instrumentalist: Alina Ibragimova
- Large-Scale Composition: Rebecca Saunders – Yes
- Opera & Music Theatre: Lady Macbeth of Mtsensk – Birmingham Opera Company
- Singer: Nina Stemme
- Storytelling: Michael Tippett: The Biography – Oliver Soden
- Young Artists: Castalian String Quartet

=== Gramophone Classical Music Awards 2019 ===
- Chamber: Debussy – 'Les Trois Sonates (The Late Works)'; Isabelle Faust, Alexander Melnikov, Tanguy de Williencourt, Magali Mosnier, Antoine Tamestit, Xavier de Maistre, Jean-Guihen Queyras, Javier Perianes (Harmonia Mundi)
- Choral: Buxtehude – Abendmusiken; Vox Luminis, Lionel Meunier, Ensemble Masque, Oliver Fortin (Alpha Classics)
- Concerto: Saint-Saëns – Piano Concertos Nos 2 and 5 / Works for solo piano; Bertrand Chamayou, Orchestre national de France, Emmanuel Krivine (Erato)
- Contemporary: Brett Dean (music) and Matthew Jocelyn (libretto) – Hamlet; Allan Clayton (Hamlet), Sarah Connolly (Gertrude), Barbara Hannigan (Ophelia), Rod Gilfry (Claudius), Kim Begley (Polonius), John Tomlinson (Ghost/Grave-Digger/Player-King, Jacques Imbrailo (Horatio); London Philharmonic Orchestra, Glyndebourne Chorus; Vladimir Jurowski (Opus Arte, DVD)
- Early Music: Manuel Cardoso – Requiem, Lamentations, Magnificat, Motets; Cupertinos, Luís Toscano (Hyperion)
- Instrumental: Yuja Wang, The Berlin Recital (Deutsche Grammophon)
- Opera: Halévy – La Reine de Chype; Véronique Gens, Cyrille Dubois, Étienne Dupuis, Éric Huchet, Christophoros Stamboglis, Artavazd Sargsya, Tomislav Lavoie; Orchestre de Chambre de Paris, Chœur de la Radio Flamande, Hervé Niquet (Bru Zane)
- Orchestral: Rued Langgaard – Symphonies Nos 2 and 6; Vienna Philharmonic Orchestra, Sakari Oramo (Dacapo)
- Recital: Cavalli – "Ombra mai fu"; Philippe Jaroussky, Ensemble Artarsere (Erato)
- Solo Vocal: Robert Schumann – Frage; Christian Gerhaher, Gerold Huber (Sony Classical)
- Concept Album: Sean Shibe – softLOUD
- Recording of the Year: Saint-Saëns – Piano Concertos Nos 2 and 5 / Works for solo piano; Bertrand Chamayou, Orchestre national de France, Emmanuel Krivine (Erato)
- Young Artist of the Year: Jakub Józef Orliński
- Label of the Year: PENTATONE
- Artist of the Year: Víkingur Ólafsson
- Orchestra of the Year: Hong Kong Philharmonic Orchestra
- Special Achievement: Birgit Nilsson Foundation
- Lifetime Achievement: Emma Kirkby

=== Musical America Awards ===
- Composer of the Year: Joan Tower
- Ensemble of the Year: Danish String Quartet
- Festival of the Year: The Salzburg Festival at 100
- Instrumentalist of the Year: Sharon Isbin
- Vocalist of the Year: Peter Mattei

=== Juno Awards ===
- Classical Album of the Year, Solo or Chamber: The End of Flowers: Works by Clarke & Ravel – Gryphon Trio
- Classical Album of the Year, Large Ensemble: Vaughan Williams: Serenade to Music, Flos Campi, Piano Concerto, Oboe Concerto – Carla Huhtanen, Emily D'Angelo, Lawrence Wiliford, Tyler Duncan (solo singers); Sarah Jeffrey (oboe); Teng Li (viola); Louis Lortie (piano); Elmer Iseler Singers; Toronto Symphony Orchestra; Peter Oundjian, conductor
- Classical Album of the Year, Vocal or Choral: Vienna: Fin de siècle – Barbara Hannigan and Reinbert de Leeuw
- Classical Composition of the Year: Ana Sokolović – Golden Slumbers Kiss your Eyes

=== Ivors Composer Awards ===
- Amateur or Young Performers: Edward Gregson – The Salamander and the Moonraker
- Chamber Ensemble: Dai Fujikura – Flute Concerto
- Choral: Geoff Hannan – Pocket Universe
- Community or Educational Project: Charlotte Harding – Convo
- Innovation – Anna Meredith
- Jazz Composition for Large Ensemble: Laura Jurd – Jumping In
- Jazz Composition for Small Ensemble: Alison Rayner – There Is A Crack in Everything
- Lifetime Achievement – Erika Fox
- Orchestral: Gavin Higgins – The Book of Miracles (Trombone Concerto)
- Small Chamber: James Weeks – Leafleoht
- Solo or Duo: Charlotte Bray – Invisible Cities
- Sonic Art: Martin Green – Aeons: A Sound Walk for Newcastle
- Stage Works: Hilda Paredes – Harriet ('Scenes in the Life of Harriet Tubman')
