= Lei Liang =

American classical composer

Lei Liang (Chinese: 梁雷; pinyin: Liáng Léi; born November 28, 1972, in Tianjin, China) is a Chinese-born American composer who was a winner of the Grawemeyer Award and a Finalist for the Pulitzer Prize in Music. He is Chancellor's Distinguished Professor of Music at the University of California, San Diego.

== Early life and education ==
Liang is the son of musicologists Liang Mao-chun (b. 1940) and Cai Liang-yu (b. 1940) and studied piano as a child. He started composing at age six. His works written before he was thirteen are widely used for piano pedagogy and included among the required repertoire for national piano competitions in China.

Liang came to the United States in 1990 for further studies, receiving BM and MM degrees from the New England Conservatory of Music, both with academic honors and distinction in performance, and a Junior Fellowship and Ph.D. from Harvard University.

== Career ==
Liang was the winner of the 2011 Rome Prize and the recipient of a Guggenheim Fellowship, an Aaron Copland Award, a Koussevitzky Foundation Commission, a Creative Capital Award, and the Goddard Lieberson Fellowship from the American Academy of Arts and Letters. His concerto Xiaoxiang (for alto saxophone and orchestra) was named a finalist for the 2015 Pulitzer Prize for Music. His orchestral work, A Thousand Mountains, A Million Streams, won the 2021 Grawemeyer Award for Music Composition.

Lei Liang was commissioned by the New York Philharmonic and its music director Alan Gilbert for the inaugural concert of the CONTACT! new music series. He studied composition at New England Conservatory of Music, where he received both a BM and a MM and then took his PhD at Harvard University as a recipient of The Paul & Daisy Soros Fellowships for New Americans. During this time, his teachers included a number of notable composers, including Sir Harrison Birtwistle, Robert Cogan, Chaya Czernowin, and Mario Davidovsky. In interviews and his own writings, Lei Liang credits Harvard ethnomusicologist Rulan Chao Pian as his most important mentor and personal influence.

Liang's fourteen portrait discs are recorded on Naxos Records, Bridge Records, Mode Records, BMOP/sound, Albany Records and New World Records, in addition to twenty compilation discs, released on Innova, Telarc and GM Records. As a scholar and conservationist of cultural traditions, he has edited and co-edited eight books and editions, and has published more than fifty articles. In 2020, Shanghai Conservatory of Music Press published a biography of Liang, with essays by composers, musicologists, ethnomusicologists, performers, music critics, literary scholars, poets, and scientists. The book was edited by Prof. Qin Luo of Shanghai Conservatory.

From 2013 to 2016, Liang served as composer-in-residence at the California Institute for Telecommunications and Information Technology where his multimedia works preserve and reimagine cultural heritage through combining scientific research and advanced technology. In 2018, Liang returned to the institute as its inaugural research artist-in-residence. In 2023, the Institute launched "Lei Lab" where he continues to collaborate with engineers, geologists, oceanographers and software developers, to explore what he calls "the unique potential for learning offered by creative listening."

Lei Liang's recent works address issues of sex trafficking across the US-Mexican border (chamber opera "Cuatro Corridos"), America's complex relationship with gun and violence (chamber opera "Inheritance"), and environmental awareness through the sonificiation of coral reefs.

Liang served as honorary professor of composition and sound design at Wuhan Conservatory of Music, as distinguished visiting professor at the Shaanxi Normal University College of Arts in Xi'an and Tianjin Conservatory of Music, and as visiting assistant professor of music at Middlebury College. Since 2009, he has taught at the University of California, San Diego where he served as chair of the composition area, acting chair of the music department, as well as the chair of the campus-wide committee on committees. Liang was appointed Chancellor's Distinguished Professor of Music in 2020.

In 2018, Lei Liang was appointed chair of the academic advisory board and artistic director of the Chou Wen-chung Music Research Center at the Xinghai Conservatory of Music in Guangzhou, China. The center was named after the influential Chinese-American composer Chou Wen-chung.

Liang's catalogue of more than a hundred works is published by Schott Music. He lives in San Diego with his son Albert.
