= Heart Chamber (opera) =

Opera by Chaya Czernowin

Heart Chamber is an English-language opera in two acts by Chaya Czernowin to a libretto by the composer, and which premiered at 15 November 2019 at the Deutsche Oper Berlin. It has also been described as music theater. The opera is scored for 5 vocalists, 5 instrumental soloists, choir, orchestra, and electronics.

== Performance history ==
Heart Chamber premiered on 15 November 2019 in at the Deutsche Oper Berlin. The production was directed by Claus Guth and conducted by Johannes Kalitzke. The cast included Patrizia Ciofi, Dietrich Henschel, Noa Frenkel, and Terry Way.

Due to the work's musical style, which requires quiet singing and vocalizations, all the singers in the production were amplified.

== Roles ==
Role	Voice type	Premiere Cast
She	Soprano	Patrizia Ciofi
Her Internal Voice	Mezzo-Soprano	Noa Frenkel
He	Baritone	Dietrich Henschel
His Internal Voice	Countertenor	Terry Wey

== Recording ==
- DVD Patrizia Ciofi, Noa Frenkel, Dietrich Henschel, Terry Wey, Ensemble Nikel, Orchester der Deutschen Oper Berlin, Johannes Kalitzke. Naxos 2020
