= Das Schloß Dürande (opera) =

Das Schloß Dürande, Op. 53, is an opera by Othmar Schoeck to a libretto by Hermann Burte based on the novel by Joseph von Eichendorff. A commission for Berlin by Werner Reinhart, the libretto was heavily weighted with the Nazi ideology of the librettist Bunte, putting the composer in conflict with his own Swiss nationalist feelings. Theater Bern staged a reworking of the music to a new libretto by Francesco Micieli on Eichendorff's novel in 2018.

== Recordings ==
- Maria Cebotari, Peter Anders, Josef Greindl, Rut Berglund, Marta Fuchs, Willi Domgraf-Fassbaender, Orchester der Staatsoper Berlin, Robert Heger, 1943
- Chorus, Konzert Theater Bern, Bern Symphony Orchestra, Mario Venzago; Claves Records 2018
