= A Thousand Mountains, A Million Streams =

Orchestral composition by Lei Liang

A Thousand Mountains, A Million Streams is a composition for orchestra by the Chinese-American composer Lei Liang. The work was commissioned by the Boston Modern Orchestra Project on a grant from the Jebediah Foundation New Music Commissions. It was first performed by the Boston Modern Orchestra Project under the direction of Gil Rose in Jordan Hall, Boston, on April 21, 2018. It is dedicated to Robert Amory and in memory of Jung Ying Tsao. The piece was later awarded the 2020, Grawemeyer Award for Music Composition.

== Composition ==
The work was inspired by a landscape painting by the Chinese ink wash painter Huang Binhong, done when the artist was almost completely blind. In the score program notes, Liang wrote, "A Thousand Mountains, A Million Streams meditates on the loss of landscapes of cultural and spiritual dimensions. The work implies an intention to preserve and resurrect parallel landscapes - both spiritual and physical – and sustain a place where we and our children can belong."

=== Structure ===
A Thousand Mountains, A Million Streams has a duration of approximately 30 minutes and is cast in two parts divided into fifteen short movements played without pause:

1. Mountains in Darkness and the Piercing Light
2. Mountains Gradually Draw Closer
3. A Song Emerges
4. Flying Clouds
5. Admonition - The Breaking Down of Landscapes
6. Opening the Inner Eyes
7. Vibration and Pulsations
8. Ethereal Lights and Distant Mountains
9. Mountains Breathing
10. Mountains in Motion
11. Mountains Take Flight
12. The Shredding of Landscapes
13. Healing Rain Drops/Part I
14. Healing Rain Drops/Part II
15. Landscape's Heartbeat Returns

=== Instrumentation ===
The music is scored for a large orchestra comprising two flutes (1st doubling piccolo, 2nd doubling alto flute), two oboes, two clarinets (2nd doubling bass clarinet), two bassoons, two horns, two trumpets, trombone, bass trombone, tuba, three percussionists, harp, piano, and strings.

== Reception ==
Reviewing the world premiere, the music critic Allan Kozinn of The Wall Street Journal praised the piece, remarking, "Cast in two large sections, reflecting the two parts of the title, the piece begins, much like Mr. Huang's work, as an abstract exercise in timbral morphing. But it quickly takes more concrete form, with the first, densely layered section evoking the imposing majesty of the mountains, and the second—scored mainly for tactile percussion—suggesting the fluidity of the streams." Guy Rickards of Gramophone similarly wrote, "In A Thousand Mountains, a Million Streams [...] Liang's tonal and textural palettes become ever more exquisite, ranging from sonorities at the edge of silence in 'Healing Rain Drops' to full-orchestral might describing the shredding of landscapes. Liang's Chinese-inflected sound world is never less than fascinating and always deeply involving."

== Recording ==
A recording of A Thousand Mountains, A Million Streams was released on album, along with Liang's Xiaoxiang and Five Seasons, under the Boston Modern Orchestra Project record label in November 2018.
