= Kurt Sander =

American composer (born 1969)

Kurt Lawrence Sander (born April 27, 1969) is an American composer of choral and instrumental works.

== Biography ==
Sander is currently a professor of composition at Northern Kentucky University. He received a D.M in Music Composition from Northwestern University where he studied with Alan Stout and Andrew Imbrie. The 2019 CD release of Sander's 90-minute choral work The Divine Liturgy of Saint John Chrysostom on the Reference Recordings label was nominated for a Grammy Award for Best Choral Performance. The recording featured the PaTRAM Institute Singers under the direction of Peter Jermihov.

== Works ==
In 1993, Sander converted to Eastern Orthodox Christianity and joined the Russian Orthodox Church. In the years since, he has dedicated much of his work to the composition of choral music inspired by the Orthodox Christian Church. His works appear in both English and Church Slavonic settings.

In 2016, Sander collaborated on an historic commission from the Saint John of Damascus Society which would become known as the Psalm 103 Project. This ground-breaking project brought together six Orthodox composers to collaborate on a concert setting of Psalm 103. The critically acclaimed choral ensemble Cappella Romana premiered this work under the title "Heaven and Earth: A Song of Creation" in Seattle, Washington, on October 12, 2018. Musica Russica published the score in March 2020. This work was recorded on Cappella Romana under the direction of John Michael Boyer and released in November 2022 on the Cappella Records label paired with Ikon of Light by John Tavener.

In April 2019, Sander's Divine Liturgy of St. John Chrysostom was released on the Reference Recordings label performed by the PaTRAM Institute Choir, Peter Jermihov, conductor. The CD was recorded by Sound Mirror with Grammy Award-winning producer Blanton Alspaugh.

Portions of the Slavonic version of Sander's Divine Liturgy of St. John Chrysostom were first performed in Russia by the Kastal'sky Choir under the direction of Peter Jermihov on January 30, 2019. The concert took place in the renowned Rachmaninoff Hall, a 300-seat auditorium housed in the Moscow State Conservatory in Russia. The complete 90-minute Slavonic version was premiered on November 30, 2022, on a concert by the vocal ensemble Canticum Festum under the direction of Lyubov Shangina in Moscow. Shangina recorded the Sander's Slavonic Liturgy in 2022 with Canticum Festum which is scheduled for release in fall of 2023.
