= Mira Zakai =

Israeli contralto opera singer

- מירה זכאי
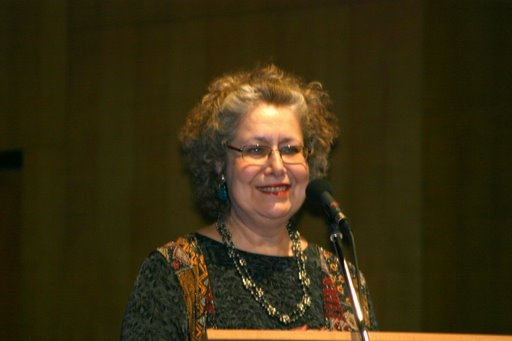
- Zakai in Leipzig, 2008
- Born: 21 September 1942; Jerusalem, Mandatory Palestine
- Died: 20 May 2019 (aged 76)
- Other name: Mira Koigen
- Education: University of Tel Aviv
- Alma mater: Buchmann-Mehta School of Music
- Occupation: Opera singer (contralto)
- Spouse: Jacob Zakai
- Children: 2 daughters
- Musical career
- Genres: Opera
- Instrument: Vocals

Mira Zakai (Hebrew: מירה זכאי; 21 September 1942 – 20 May 2019) was an Israeli contralto.

Zakai was born in Jerusalem as Mira Koigen, the daughter of George Koigen and his wife Eva (née Patai). She studied at the University of Tel Aviv, initially in the Faculty of Humanities, and later at the Rubin Academy of Music, graduating in 1976. She married Jacob Zakai, and they had two daughters.

Zakai made many appearances with the Israeli Philharmonic Orchestra, with the Israeli Opera, the Berlin Philharmonic, the New York Philharmonic (Mehta, Leinsdorf), the Chicago Symphony Orchestra, and others. She appeared with Yehudi Menuhin in a concert at Castel Gandolfo for Pope John Paul II, having previously appeared at Menuhin's festival as a soloist in Bach's Mass in B minor. Her 1982 recording of Mahler's Symphony No. 2 with Georg Solti won the Grammy for Best Overall Classical Recording at the 1982 awards.

Zakai gave Lieder Recitals in venues such as the Alice Tully Hall in New York, as well as Paris, Amsterdam, Berlin, Hamburg, Heidelberg, Moskva, St. Peterburg, Brussels, Antwerp, Montreal and Glasgow, where she also made her international opera debut with Scottish Opera alternating performances with Dame Janet Baker as Orfeo in Gluck's Orfeo ed Euridice. She played a wide range of roles, from Prince Orlovsky to Ulrica and Erda.

Zakai's many recordings included Mahler's Resurrection Symphony with Chicago Symphony Orchestra and Sir Georg Solti [which won a "Grammy" award]. "Boris Gudonov" and "War and Peace" with Mstislav Rostropovich. "Moses and Ahron" with Solti and Chicago, "Midnight Vigil" [M. Seter] with Bertini and the IPO as well as many solo recitals—Israeli Songs, Ladino songs, a collection of songs by poets who perished in the Holocaust - composed by Norbert Glanzberg, the famous chansonnier [for Beth Hatfutsot]. A recital of songs by Schumann Ravel Honneger Werfel Sevenent [ed. R Gaii - Belgium]. For Koch int. She recorded a recital of Mahler, Webern, Berg songs with the pianist Jonathan Zak—joined for Ravel's "Chancones Madecasses" and Handel's "Mi Palpita il Core"—by M. Haran, A. Biron and Shalev Ad El.

For her special contribution to Israeli music, Zakai received the Composers and Playwrights Association award [ACUM]. In 1990, Zakai won the Arts and Culture Council prize for best performance of Israeli compositions. In honour of Israel's 50th anniversary, she received a special award for her dedication, contribution, inspiration and performance of Israeli contemporary music from the minister of culture and education.

In 1997, Zakai moved into teaching, becoming a professor at the Buchmann-Mehta School of Music, University of Tel Aviv. teaching voice, Oratorio and Lied.
