= Luca Luciano =

Italian composer

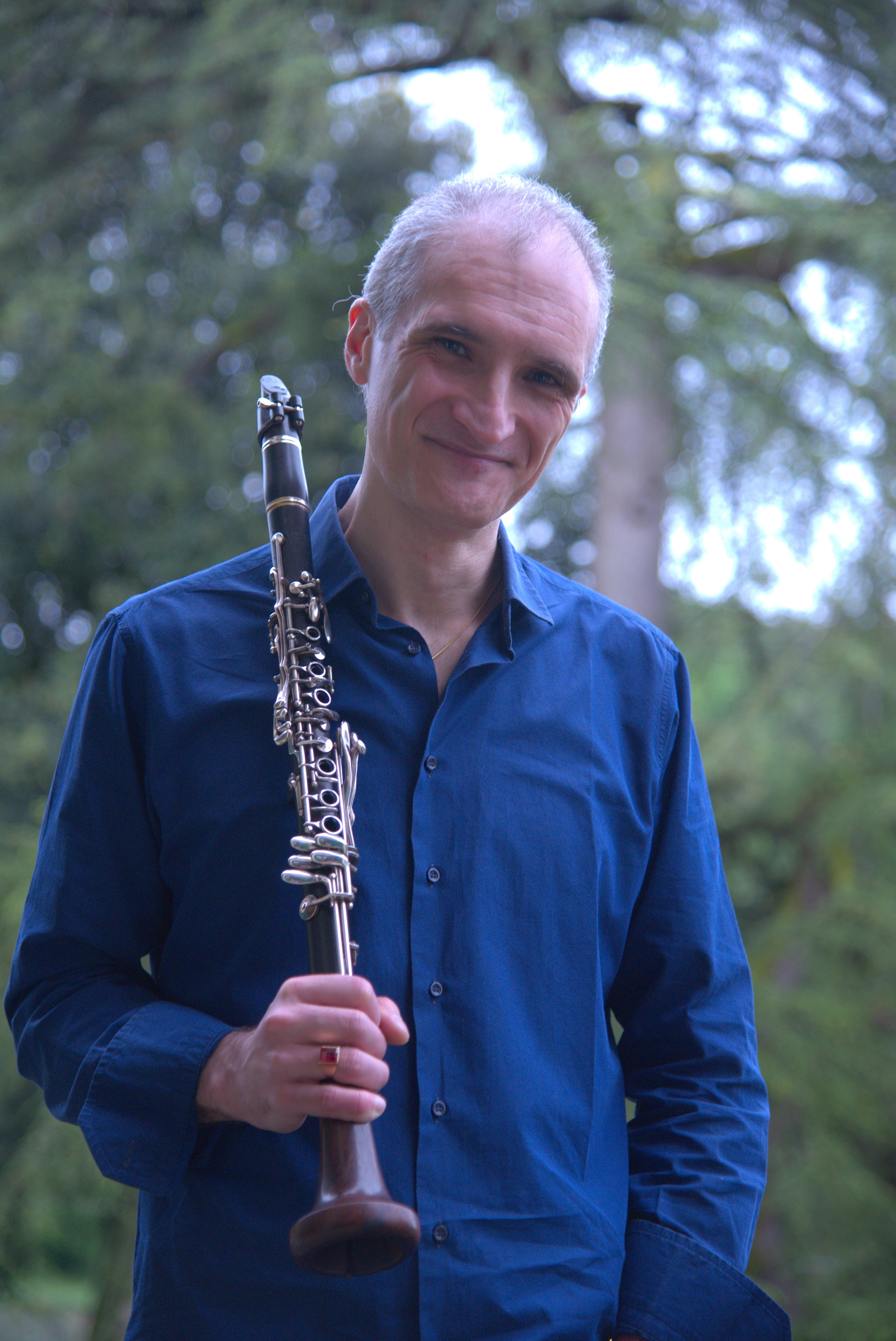
Luca Luciano in 2021

Luca Luciano (born 12 August 1975) is a solo artist and a thinker, a clarinet virtuoso and a composer with a strong interest in philosophy, who has made his career in Great Britain, lived in London for more than twenty years and now lives between the UK and Italy.

== Early life and education ==
Luciano was born in Naples, Italy. He began his career at the age of twelve performing at the Sala Curci of Naples. He received a master's degree from the Conservatory of Music of Salerno (Italy) in 1999 and he is awarded the Fellow Status of the Higher Education Academy of Great Britain in 2010.

== Life and work ==
Luciano has defined himself as a solo artist, not solely an instrumentalist, but a complete musician in line with the tradition set by the great maestri of the past. He has held the position of clarinet professor at the Leeds College of Music in the UK, he is a specialist of both classical and improvised music and his research focuses on extended techniques, unconventional sound production, sound effects and new compositions for solo clarinet. Music to him is part of a broader philosophical path (in the sense of "philo-sophia") where creativity is an important element of his life with an ontological relevance to him. When it comes to his art, "Luciano seems intent on challenging preconceptions" and his interpretations are praised as "bold and unique".

Introduced as "the new voice of the clarinet" by De Klarinet magazine, a keen promoter of new music, he has been described by Musician Magazine as "a noted Italian clarinettist and composer who now makes his home in London, having developed an enviable reputation as an instrumental virtuoso around the UK and overseas via recordings and concert hall appearances". Praised by the International Clarinet Association for "the full range of his abilities", Luciano was introduced by the BBC as "one of Europe's leading exponents of jazz clarinet".

He has "established himself as the friendly face of contemporary clarinet" according to the Clarinet & Saxophone Magazine. He has held several recitals, master-classes, lecture-recitals and workshops in the UK, Europe and South America including the South Bank Centre in London, the Barber Institute of Fine Arts (Birmingham University), the Edinburgh Festival in Scotland, SESI Serie International and Centro Cultural São Paulo (Brazil), European Clarinet Festival in Belgium, The American Cathedral in Paris. In recent years he has been focusing primarily on his own music with premieres regularly held at St Martin in the Fields in London for their "New Music Series", Cambridge University and overseas. His compositions have been cited on books about the clarinet repertoire.

His research on extended techniques, sound effects, unconventional sound production and their application on composed or improvised music started when he took up a position as a Lecturer at the Leeds College of Music (UK) and has carried on over the years resulting in the publication of his "Introductory Method to Extended Techniques" for clarinet which sums up the last fifteen years of his research.

== Music style and aesthetics ==
As a composer, Luciano is not much interested in serialism (except for some very short passages of dodecaphonic technique here and there). His eclectic approach to music-making is inspired by the great musical figures of the past (who excelled as performers, improvisers, composers, conductors, educators, etc.) with a strong will to be a complete musician. Besides what he calls "performance pieces" (i.e. original material or arrangements he has written for his own performances) one can find several short compositions, highly condensed miniature pieces that range from more experimental and ground-breaking clarinet solo pieces informed by his research to more melodic music for clarinet and piano or other chamber ensembles (see his series of fragments or divertimenti). The influence of and his experience with popular music (including the folkloric music of his native land) can be noticed, above all jazz music, resulting in a style that alternates music full of energy (thanks to his harmonies and rhythms), sense of humour and melancholy (see his sonatas for clarinet and piano). He has also written music for rarely used combinations of instruments, like clarinet and guitar trio/quartet or music for clarinet, guitar and piano.

In terms of aesthetics, post-modernism is a good way to define most of his work. The "ironic re-elaboration" of the styles of the past (as Umberto Eco would put it) is evident in music that is often characterised by a peculiar sense of humour often using the form of the musical parody, most of all the "window form" (as the composer Salvatore Sciarrino would call it), where the artist "opens up" a new door to a different "world" as clearly evident on his two of his major works, Sequenza #1 and #2 (among the very few pieces that last more than ten minutes) and some of his compositions for clarinet and piano. For this reason one can find the use of music quotations from major composers or folkloric tunes, but also the creation of new folk tunes as intended by Bartok. The use of the "alea" ("aleatoric music") is quite frequent in Luciano's music for he aims at making the poetic gesture and the reproduction of the composition coincide, making the piece unique every time it is performed. In his specific case, we find passages of "real-time" variations/permutations of an "incipit" (a short idea and often a segment of the chromatic scale), impromptu cadenzas and passages that leave to performers the choice of the line or segment of the scores they have to play in a certain "time-field". This also explains the use of the basso continuo he makes on compositions for clarinet and piano (in this case a modern way to execute it combining notation and chord symbols if needed), mainly on his sonatas in one movement in fact inspired by the "sonata a solo" of the barocco era (for violin and b.c.).

In terms of harmonies, Luciano generally does note follow the criteria of functional harmony. Instead, one finds chromatic chords, polytonality, clusters, passing notes ascending or descending chromatically and a peculiar use of quartal harmonies or mirror chords combined with edgy rhythms. In some cases, as in the Divertimento for Orchestra, we have a polyphony of independent lines with chromatic passages that create peculiar harmonies and dissonances. To him there is no need to emancipate dissonances, on the contrary, he wants dissonance and different shades of chromatic colours eventually releasing the tension on a more conventional chord (quite rarely using a conventional cadence passage). Some music is wholly chromatic, like Sonata #5 for clarinet and basso continuo.

It is really on the compositions for clarinet solo and clarinet ensemble where we find more experimental and ground-breaking material (e.g. "Mosquito", "Divertimento #9", "Divertimento #12"). Informed by his research on extended techniques, sound effects and unconventional sound production, we find lots of microtonal music where he draws in more pitches (quarter tones and microtones) to the chromatic scale generally using them as grace notes or embellishments. Often Luciano exploits a small cell made of a few notes (generally a segment of the chromatic scale) that he then varies, modulating them or transposing them or using the above-mentioned sound effects (a good example of this is Fragments #6 and the "Fantasia for Demi-Clarinets"). On most pieces there is clearly a gravitational pull, that is a note that acts as an anchor around which the music gravitates (as evident in Fragment #4).

== Educational Publications ==
The “Introductory Method to Extended Techniques” for clarinet (bilingual, English/Italian) comes with an audio CD featuring clarinet solo music (all the contemporary studies on the method plus the original compositions in the appendix) performed by Luciano himself, which is really a solo album in its own merit, still with a musical purpose to it and a strong creative drive. This publication sums up the last fifteen years of a research Luciano started long time ago when he took up a lecturing position in the UK. All these years of study, travels around the world, interchanges (with other scholars, musicians, composers) and, above all, plenty of experimentation and contemporary music practice (as a performer and as a composer or improviser), have led to this publication. The author aims at giving to other instrumentalists the possibility of learning unconventional techniques that are useful for the last century’s repertoire and today’s music (classical, jazz, world music, etc.), but also useful to those who want to approach this subject as part of their studies and/or research. The method consists of three parts: during the first part, clarinettists will work on different techniques separately, one for each chapter, and each chapter will include little examples and exercises along with short Studies designed for that specific technique; the second part features ten Etudes where more than one technique is applied on its own or combined with another sound effect. The Appendix features Luciano’s compositions recently premiered at the prestigious St Martin in the Fields in London and Cambridge University or at other established concert series and, above all, included in the attached CD along with all the recordings of the short studies and of the Contemporary Etudes. The author constantly encourages creativity and an active approach to studying the material presented in this publication with a strong incentive towards experimentation and diverging thinking.

== Selected works ==
Clarinet Solo:

- Fantasia for Demi-Clarinet (2015)
- Fantasia Microtonale (2024)
- Fragment #4 (2010)
- Fragment #5 (2010)
- Fragment #6 (2014)
- Fragment #8 (2016)
- Homage to Puccini (2015)
- Rondò Contemporaneo (2010)
- Sequenza #1 "Il Prescelto" (2008)
- Sequenza #2 in A minor "The Resurrection" (2008)

Clarinet and piano:

- Fragment #2 (Red Kite Music Limited, Bucks Music Group Ltd, 2005)
- Fragment #3 (2010)
- Homage to Poulenc #2 (2017)
- Sonata #2 "Stellare" per clarinetto e basso continuo (Red Kite Music Limited, Bucks Music Group Ltd, 2004)
- Sonata #3, in one movement (Red Kite Music Limited, Bucks Music Group Ltd, 2004)
- Sonata #5, per clarinetto e basso continuo (2008)
- Sonata #6 "Birth, life and death of Stravinsky", in one movement (2007)
- Sonata #8, in one movement (2018)

Clarinet ensembles or clarinet-led ensembles:

- DesafiNapoli. for Clarinet and Guitar Quartet (2012)
- Divertimento #3, "Londrina" for Clarinet Trio (Red Kite Music Limited, Bucks Music Group Ltd, 2004)
- Divertimento #4, for Clarinet Quartet or for solo clarinet with tape/pre-recorded parts(2009)
- Divertimento #5, "Concertando com Tau" for Clarinet and Guitar Quartet (2011)
- Divertimento #6 "Guido", for Clarinet and String Quartet (2008)
- Divertimento #7, "Canone, cadenza e finale from a theme of Prokofiev's Lt. Kije" for Clarinet Quartet (2008)
- Divertimento #9 "The Damnation of the Dreamer", for solo clarinet with tape/pre-recorded parts (2008)
- Divertimento #11 for Clarinet Trio or also available for Duo Clarinet and Bass Clarinet (2012)
- Divertimento #12 "La Redentrice del Sognatore", for solo clarinet with tape/pre-recorded parts (2015)
- "Mosquito", for Clarinet and Tape (pre-recorded clarinet, 2015)
- Variations on "Rasga o Meu Coraçao", Homenagem a Villa-Lobos, for clarinet and guitar quartet (2014)
- Vocalizzo, for clarinet and guitar (2015)

Other chamber ensemble

- Divertimento "Mediterraneo", for two guitars (2017)
- Fragment #9, for guitar and piano (2016)
- Two Miniatures for guitar and piano, from the album Poeta (2014)

for Orchestra

- Divertimento for Orchestra (2022)

Educational:

- Metodo per il Clarinetto Contemporaneo / Introductory Method to Extended Techniques for clarinet, Musitalia Editore 2026

== Discography (as a solo artist) ==
- Passione M.A.P., Italy 2000
- Neapolis Red Kite, UK 2005
- Clarinet Partenope Productions/MCPS 2008 (digital reissue 2010)
- Partenope Partenope Productions/MCPS 2011
- Poeta Soundset (USA)/MCPS (UK) 2016
- Fragments NovAntiqua, Italy 2018
- XX Century Music for Solo Clarinet NovAntiqua, Italy, 2021
- Live in Salvador Partenope Productions, Italy, 2024
