= Felipe Lara =

Brazilian-American composer (born 1979)

- Born: 1979 (age 46–47); Sorocaba, Brazil
- Education: Berklee College of Music (BM); Tufts University (MM); New York University (PhD)
- Occupations: Composer, professor
- Employer: Johns Hopkins University
- Notable work: Double Concerto
- Website: felipelara.com

Felipe Lara (born 1979) is a Brazilian-American composer and professor. He was a finalist for the 2024 Pulitzer Prize for Music.

== Early life and education ==
Lara was born in Sorocaba, Brazil. He moved to the United States in 1997 from Moema to enroll at the Berklee College of Music, initially intending to study jazz guitar and arranging but earning a Bachelor of Music in composition in 2002. He recalls falling in love with contemporary classical music after hearing the Boston Symphony Orchestra perform Olivier Messiaen's Turangalîla-Symphonie.

Lara earned a master's in composition from Tufts University and a Ph.D. in composition from New York University.

== Works ==
Lara's contemporary work makes use of nontraditional instrumentations for classical settings, including electronics. He is known for compositions that make contextual use of their performance space and experiment with new methods for producing sound. He has described his philosophy as "trying to exploit zones where 'timbre becomes harmony,' and harmony, in turn, becomes noise.'"

In 2014, the International Contemporary Ensemble premiered Lara's Voz dos Ventos and performed his Livro dos Sonhos (Book of Dreams) at The Phillips Collection. The Washington Post noted the pieces featured "shrieks and slides, hissing, flutter-tonguing and almost percussive sounds that stretch the limits of instrumental possibilities." In 2015, the ensemble's bassoonist Rebekah Heller performed Lara's Metafagote, which pairs a solo bassoonist with six pre-recorded bassoon tracks, at the Abrons Arts Center.

In 2018, the Talea Ensemble performed Lara's Fringes, in which performers surround the audience on three sides, at the Baryshnikov Arts Center in Manhattan.

In 2019, Lara was commissioned by the Library of Congress for the large ensemble composition Brutal Mirrors, which was inspired by photography of Soviet architecture.

Lara was widely acknowledged for his Double Concerto, written for vocalist and bassist esperanza spalding, flautist Claire Chase, and orchestra. The piece, written in 2019, premiered under the baton of Susanna Mälkki at the Helsinki Philharmonic Orchestra in 2021. It incorporates significant soloistic improvisation and modernist soundscapes, producing what The New York Times critic Zachary Woolfe called "a miniature universe of sounds." Chase wrote that the entanglement of the soloists in the work causes them to become "a many-tentacled creature.” The piece received a Pulitzer Prize nomination in 2024.

His compositions have been performed at the Tanglewood and Ars Musica festivals.

== Career ==
Lara is associate professor and chair of composition at the Peabody Institute at Johns Hopkins University.

In 2003, he and four other graduate students formed áltaVoz, a consortium to increase the presence of Latin American music in the Boston area. The group released a CD featuring compositions performed by the JACK Quartet in 2014.
