= Chaya Czernowin =

Israeli-American composer and professor

- חיה צ'רנובין
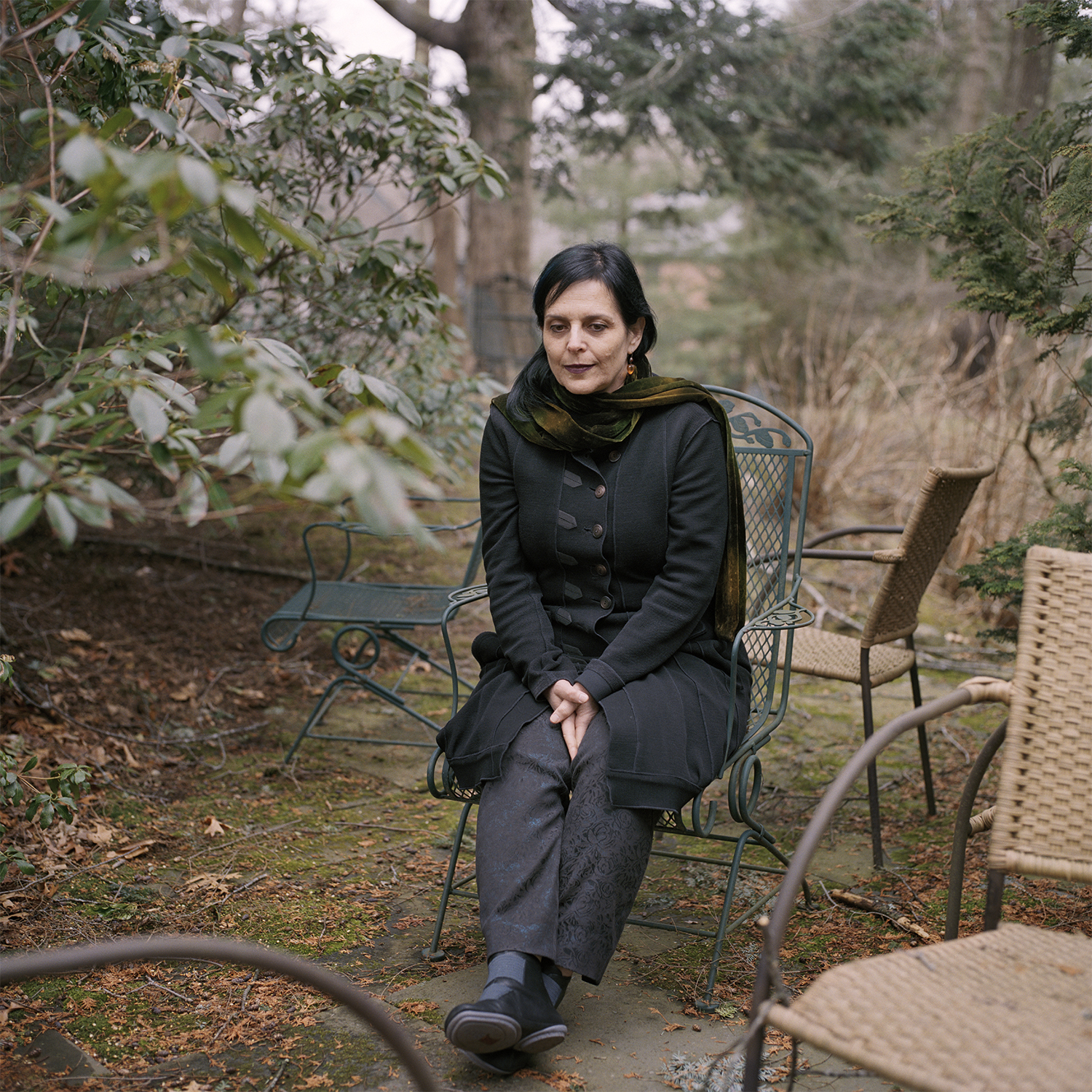
- Born: December 7, 1957 (age 68); Haifa, Israel
- Title: Walter Bigelow Rosen Professor of Music at Harvard University
- Awards: Guggenheim Fellow; Ernst von Siemens Music Prize

Academic background
- Education: Tel-Aviv University; Bard College; University of California, San Diego (Ph.D. 1993)
- Academic advisors: Roger Reynolds; Brian Ferneyhough
- Website: https://www.chayaczernowin.com/

Chaya Czernowin (Hebrew: חיה צ'רנובין, Hebrew pronunciation: [ˌχaja t͡ʃɛʁˈnobin]; born December 7, 1957) is an Israeli American contemporary classical composer internationally known for her extensive oeuvre which includes opera, orchestral, chamber and solo compositions. In 2009, she was appointed Walter Bigelow Rosen Professor of Music at Harvard University.

The Jury of the German Music Authors' Prize 2022 considered Chaya Czernowin “(...) one of the most important living composers. Her oeuvre is diverse and large, her musical language radical and idiosyncratic. Her four operas are like shock waves for the genre. She makes existential themes tangible and perceptible for the audience with her compositions.”

== Education and early career ==
Czernowin was born on 7 December 1957 in Haifa and raised in Israel. She studied in Israel, Germany, and in the United States. She also received fellowships to compose in Japan and in Germany. Czernowin studied at Tel-Aviv University's Rubin Academy of Music and then Bard College before receiving her PhD from the University of California, San Diego (UCSD) in 1993, where she studied with Roger Reynolds and Brian Ferneyhough.

Czernowin spent several years after her formal studies on residencies and fellowships in Japan, Europe, and the United States. She was awarded the Ernst von Siemens Composer Prize in 2003.

From 1997 to 2006, she was professor of composition at UCSD, and between 2006 and 2009 she was professor of composition at the University of Music and Performing Arts, Vienna.

Together with Jean-Baptiste Jolly (director of Akademie Schloss Solitude) and with composer Steven Kazuo Takasugi, she founded the Sommerakademie at Schloss Solitude, a biannual course for composers that took place from 2003 until 2017 in Stuttgart, Germany.

In 2009, she was appointed Walter Bigelow Rosen Professor of Music at Harvard University; she was also the first woman to be appointed professor of composition at both the University of Music and Performing Arts Vienna and Harvard University.

== Musical works ==
=== Operas ===
- "opera without words," PNIMA...ins innere. (2000), premiered at the Munich Biennale
- A companion to Mozart's fragment, Adama/Zäide (2004/05), premiered at the Salzburger Festspiele
- "Infinite Now" (2017), opera in six acts, premiered at the Vlaamse Opera in Ghent
- Heart Chamber, 2019, premiered at the Deutsche Oper Berlin.

=== Orchestra ===
- Moths of hunger and awe for violin solo and a string orchestra (2023/24)
- RARE EARTH alchimia communicationis for solo live and pre-recorded double bass and large ensemble (2022)
- Fast Darkness II: I freeze and melt for solo clarinet and chamber orchestra (2020)
- Fast Darkness I : I can see your turned eyes from inside your body for solo bass/contra-bass clarinet and chamber orchestra (2020)
- Guardian for cello and a large orchestra (2017)
- Once I blinked nothing was the same – A large scale miniature for orchestra (2015)
- White Wind Waiting amplified acoustic guitar and orchestra (2013)
- At the fringe of our gaze for orchestra plus a chamber group of 5 players (2013)
- Zohar Iver (blind radiance) (The Crescendo Trilogy Part II) for ensemble and orchestra divided into three groups (2011)
- The Quiet (The Crescendo Trilogy Part I) for large orchestra divided into three groups (2010)
- Maim (water), triptych for large orchestra, tubax recorded and a quintet of soloists (oboe, tubax, electric guitar, piano, viola) (2001/2002) I: maim zarim maim gnuvim (strange water stolen water) (2002); II: The memory of water (2006); III: mei mechaa (water of disent) (2005–2006)
- Dam Sheon Hachol (the hourglass bleeds still) version for string orchestra (2002)
- Shu Hai in an orchestral setting for orchestra, female voice, and live electronics (2001)
- Liquid Amber for three piccolos solo and large orchestra (2000)
- Amber for large orchestra (1993)
- Birds for string orchestra (1984)

=== Ensemble ===
- Song for a Lost Child for ensemble (2025)
- The divine thawing of the core for solo contra-bass flute and ensemble (2024/25)
- The Fabrication of Light for large ensemble (2020)
- On the Face of the Deep for large ensemble (2017)
- Slow Summer Stay III (Upstream) for 16 players (2016)
- Ayre: Towed through plumes, thicket, asphalt, sawdust and hazardous air I shall not forget the sound of for amplified chamber ensemble (2015)
- Knights of the strange version for ensemble (2014)
- Winter Songs Version IV: Wounds/Mistletoe for two septets and three percussionists (2014)
- Slow Summer Stay II (Lakes) for 8 players (2012)
- Slow Summer Stay I (Streams) for 8 players (2012)
- Lovesong for mixed ensemble (2010)
- Sheva for seven players (2008)
- Anea Crystal for Two String Quartets and an Octet (2008)
- Excavated Dialogues Fragments – Second version for a mixed ensemble of modern and Renaissance/Baroque instruments (2003, rev. 2005)
- Excavated Dialogues Fragments for a mixed ensemble of Eastern and Western instruments (2003)
- Winter Songs III: Roots for live electronics, seven instruments and three percussionists (2003)
- Winter Songs II: Stones for seven instruments and three percussionists (2003)
- Winter Songs I: Pending Light for live electronics and seven instruments (2002/2003)
- Afatsim for mixed ensemble (1996)

=== Chamber music ===
- The Redheaded Man "... and then I realized that I am the world. But the world – is not me." Musiktheater for 6 musicians (2025/26)
- Undersongs for Saxophone Quartet (2025)
- EZOV (Moss) String Quartet No. 4 (2024)
- Poetica (Vena I) for percussion solo, percussion ensemble, prerecorded strings and IRCAM electronics (2023)
- Fast Darkness III: Moonwords Sextet for amplified flute, clarinet, piano and string trio (2022)
- Knights of the strange Duo version for electric guitar and accordion (2015)
- HIDDEN for string quartet and electronics (2013/14)
- Gradual edge for violoncello and organ (2011)
- Duo Leat (Slow Duo) for 2 Bass-Clarinets (2009/10)
- Sheva (Seven) for seven instrumentalists (2008)
- Drift (Sahaf) for saxophone (baritone and sopranino) or clarinet (Eb clarinet and bass clarinet), E-guitar, piano and percussion (timpano, marimba, 2 plastic triangle liners, bamboo wind chime, ocean drum, ratchet, snare drum) (2008)
- While Liquid Amber for 3 flutes (2000)
- String Quartet (1995)
- Die Kreuzung for accordion, alt saxsophone and bass (1994)
- A map of a recurrent dream for sho, u, live and pre-recorded Tape (1994)
- Dam Sheon Hachol (the hourglass bleeds still) for string sextet (1992)

=== Vocal music ===
- NO! A Lament for the Innocent Version I: For one amplified high soprano and twenty-four musicians with tape / Version II: For two amplified high sopranos and two antiphonal orchestras of twenty-four musicians (2023/24)
- Unforeseen dusk: bones into wings for six amplified voices (SMezATBarB) and orchestra (with sampler) (2023)
- Unhistoric Acts – (Vena, part II) for mixed 24 voices choir and string quartet (2021)
- Immaterial (Vena III) for 6 voices (2021)
- Atara – A lament for orchestra and two amplified voices (2020/21)
- Irrational for Baritone, Bass Clarinet, Trumpet and Trombone (2018/19)
- Habekhi (The Crying) for low female voice, ensemble and electronics (2018)
- Five action sketches – Five miniatures for 2 voices and ensemble (2014)
- Esh (Fire) For Orchestra and Countertenor (2012)
- Winter Songs Version V: Forgotten Light for two septets and octet with two singers (2012)
- Rega echad, sheket bevakasha (Just a moment, silence please) for choir and orchestra (2012)
- Algae – A Monodrama for Bass and Piano (2009)
- Pilgerfahrten for narrator, boy's choir, and instrumental ensemble (2005/2006, rev. 2007)
- Six Miniatures and a Simultaneous Song for mixed ensemble and a singer (1998)
- Shu Hai Mitamen Behatalat Kidon (Shu Hai Practices Javalin) for solo female voice and recorded nine voices with live electronics (1996/1997)
- Manoalchadia for bass flute and two female voices (1988)

=== Solo works ===
- Black Flowers for Solo Electric Guitar (2018)
- Adiantum Capillus-Veneris I (Maidenhair fern I/II/III) for Voice and Breath (2015/16) also arranged for Solo violoncelo (only I) by Séverine Ballon (2015/16)
- fardanceCLOSE for Solo Piano (2012/20)
- The last leaf for solo Oboe (2010) / version for sopranino saxophone (2010/12)
- Tris for Solo Percussionist (with pre-recorded parts) or for 3 Percussionists (1993)
- LeArye for violin and 15 pre-recorded violins and violas (1990)
- Ina for bass flute and pre-recorded flutes (1989)
- For Violin Solo (1981) also in versions for Viola and Cello (1981/2015)

== Awards and Distinctions ==
- (2026) Composer in Residence at the Wittener Tage für neue Kammermusik
- (2025/26) Composer in focus at the Musikverein Wien
- (2025) “COUP DE COUER” from the “Académie Charles Cros” for the Album “Seltene Erde & Atara” (KAIROS)
- (2022) German Music Author's Award of the GEMA – category "Composition Music Theatre"
- (2021) Member of the Bavarian Academy of Fine Arts
- (2021) Composer in Residence at Huddersfield Contemporary Music Festival
- (2019) Member of the Board of the European Music Theater Academy
- (2017) Member of the Academy of Arts, Berlin
- (2017) "World premiere of the Year" by Opernwelt's annual critic survey for “Infinite Now”
- (2016) Heidelberger Künstlerinnenpreis
- (2014) Composer in Residency at IRCAM’s Manifeste (Paris)
- (2013) Composer in Residency at “Musica nova” (Helsinki)
- (2013) Composer in Residence at the Lucerne Festival
- (2011) Guggenheim Fellowship Award
- (2008) Fromm Foundation Award
- (2005/06) Composer in Residence at the Salzburg Festival
- (2004) Rockefeller Foundation Prize
- (2003) Composer Prize by the Ernst von Siemens Music Foundation
- (2000) Bavarian Theatre Prize and "World premiere of the Year" by Opernwelt's annual critic survey for the Opera "Pnima...ins Innere"
- (1996) Akademie Schloss Solitude Fellowship
- (1993) Asahi Shimbun Fellowship Prize
- (1993) Kranichsteiner Musikpreis

== Bibliography ==
- Gur, Golan. Czernowin, Chaya. In: Bayerisches Musiker-Lexikon Online..
- Seter, Ronit: Czernowin, Chaya. In: The New Grove Dictionary of Music and Musicians. vol. 6, 2nd. ed. Stanley Sadie, London 2001, pp. 823f. Also available through Grove Music Online
