= Dance! =

Dance! may refer to:

- Dance! (Lumidee and Fatman Scoop song), 2006 song included on the album FIFA World Cup 2006 Soundtrack featuring R&B artist Lumidee and Fatman Scoop
- "Dance!", song included on the 1986 album "Get Close" by the Pretenders
- Dance! La Fuerza del Corazón, 2011 Uruguayan telenovela, widely known by the shortened title Dance!

== See also ==
- Dance (disambiguation)
