= La Danse =

La Danse may refer to:

== Art ==
- Dance (Matisse) or La Danse, a painting by Henri Matisse
- La Danse (Bouguereau), a painting by William-Adolphe Bouguereau
- La Danse, an artwork by Shelomo Selinger at La Défense, Paris
- La Danse, a sculpture by Francesc Viladomat at Casa de la Vall, Andorra
- La Danse (Carpeaux), a sculpture by Jean-Baptiste Carpeaux

== Music ==
- La Danse, a ballet choreographed by Adeline Genée with music composed by Dora Bright
- La Danse, a ballet composed by Ernest Ford
- "La danse", a composition by Ethel Smyth
- "La Danse", a song by Susan Herndon from In the Attic
- "La Danse", a song by Bündock from Cinéma
- La danse, a composition by Moritz Moszkowski for piano
- La danse, a composition by Yasushi Akutagawa for piano

== Film ==
- La Danse (film), a 2009 French documentary

== See also ==
- La Dance (disambiguation)
- The Dance (disambiguation)
- Dance (disambiguation)
- Danse (disambiguation)
