= Dance (disambiguation) =

Dance is an art form and sport of coordinated bodily movement, typically to music and musical rhythms (e.g., drum beats).

Dance may also refer to:

== Music ==
- Dance music, a music genre
- Electronic dance music (sometimes known as dance), an electronic music genre

=== Albums ===
- Dance (Despina Vandi album), 2004
- Dance (Gary Numan album), 1981
- Dance (Keller Williams album), 2003
- Dance (Lollipop F album), 2011
- Dance (Paul Motian album), 1977
- Dance (Pure Prairie League album), 1976
- Dance (SCH album), 2007

=== Compositions ===
- Dance (Clyne), cello concerto by Anna Clyne

=== Songs ===
- "Dance" (Alexandra Stan song), 2014
- "Dance!" (Lumidee and Fatman Scoop song), 2006
- "Dance" (Nina Girado song), 2011
- "Dance" (Ratt song), 1986
- "Dance" (Toni Braxton song), 2020
- "Dance (A$$)", by Big Sean, 2011
- "Dance (Disco Heat)", by Sylvester, 1978
- "Dance (While the Music Still Goes On)", by ABBA, 1974
- "Dance (With U)", by Lemar, 2003
- "D.A.N.C.E.", by Justice, 2007
- "Dance...", by Slayyyter, 2026
- "Dance", by CLMD & Tungevaag, 2019
- "Dance", by ESG from Come Away with ESG, 1983
- "Dance", by Dance Nation
- "Dance", by Rick Astley from 50, 2016
- "Dance", by S Club from Seeing Double, 2002
- "Dance", by Sam Kim from I Am Sam, 2016
- "Dance", by Westlife from Spectrum, 2019
- "Dance", written by Jerry Leiber and Mike Stoller

== Places ==
- Dancé, Loire, a commune in the Loire department in central France
- Dancé, Orne, a commune in the Orne department in northwestern France
- Dańce, a village in Poland

== Television ==
- Dance! La Fuerza del Corazón, 2011 Uruguayan telenovela, widely known by the shortened title Dance!
- Dance (Finnish TV series), dance competition television show
- "Dance", a ChuckleVision episode
- "Dance" (Dawson's Creek), a 1998 episode
- "Dance", a live-action The Super Mario Bros. Super Show! episode
- "Dance", an episode of Off the Air

== Other uses ==
- Dance (event), a social gathering where people dance
- Dance (surname)
- Dance Magazine
- Dance (Matisse), a 1910 painting by Henri Matisse

== See also ==
- DNCE, American pop band fronted by Joe Jonas
- Dancer (disambiguation)
- Dancing (disambiguation)
- The Dance (disambiguation)
- La Danse (disambiguation)
- La Dance (disambiguation)
- Dance, Dance (disambiguation)
- Dance, Dance, Dance (disambiguation)
- Danse (disambiguation)
