= Dancing Machine (disambiguation) =

Dancing Machine is a 1973 song recorded by The Jackson 5.

Dancing Machine may also refer to:

- Dancing Machine (The Jackson 5 album), 1973
- Dancing Machine (Borut Kržišnik album), 2020
- Gene Gene the Dancing Machine (1932–2015), occasional performer on American talent show The Gong Show
- Dancing Machine (film), a 1990 French thriller film

== See also ==
- Dance Machine, an American dance game show and competition
- Dancing (disambiguation)
