= Dancing (disambiguation) =

Dancing is the act of performing dance.

Dancing may also refer to:

== Music ==
- Dancin', a musical revue directed and choreographed by Bob Fosse

=== Albums ===
- Dancing (album), an album by Elisa
- Dancing, 1988 compilation album by Australian band I'm Talking
- Dancing, 2000 album by Mike Keneally
- Dancing, 2013 album by Nancy Elizabeth

=== Songs ===
- "Dancin'" (Aaron Smith song)
- "Dancing" (Elisa song)
- "Dancin'" (Guy song)
- "Dancing" (Mai Kuraki song)
- "Dancing" (Kylie Minogue song)
- "Dancing", by Orchestral Manoeuvres in the Dark from Orchestral Manoeuvres in the Dark

=== Television ===
- Dancing with the Stars (American TV series)
- "Dancing" (Not Going Out), a 2011 episode

== Film ==
- Dancing (film), 1933
- Dancin': It's On!, 2015

== See also ==
- Dance (disambiguation)
- Dancer (disambiguation)
- The Dance (disambiguation)
