= La Dance =

La Dance may refer to:

- "La Dance", a song by Paps 'n' Skar
- "La Dance", a song by Gigi D'Agostino from L'Amour Toujours

== See also ==
- Jean la Dance, a character in the 1945 film Zombies on Broadway
- La Danse (disambiguation)
- Dance (disambiguation)
- The Dance (disambiguation)
