= Dance, Dance =

Dance, Dance may refer to:

== Film and television ==
- Dance Dance (film), a 1987 Indian film by Babbar Subhash
- Dance Dance (2017 film), a Malayalam film of 2017
- Dance Dance (TV series), a 2021 Indian Kannada-language reality show

== Music ==
- "Dance, Dance" (Booty Luv song), 2008
- "Dance, Dance" (Fall Out Boy song), 2005
- Dance Dance (Day6 song), 2017
- "Dance, Dance (The Mexican)", a song by Thalia, 2003
- "Dance Dance", a song by Cage the Elephant from Social Cues, 2019
- "Dance Dance", a song by Preeya Kalidas ft. Mumzy Stranger, 2010
- Dance Dance!, an album by the Wiggles, 2016

== See also ==
- Dance Dance Revolution, a music video game
- Dance, Dance, Dance (disambiguation)
- Dance (disambiguation)
