= Piano Concerto No. 2 (Moszkowski) =

1898 composition by Moritz Moszkowski

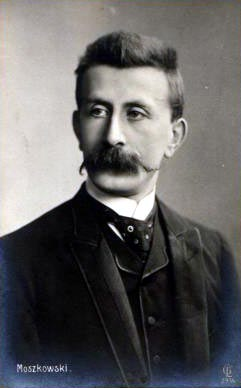
Moritz Moszkowski in his twenties

The Piano Concerto No. 2 in E major, Op. 59, is an 1898 composition by Moritz Moszkowski. It was dedicated to pianist Josef Hofmann.

== Music ==
The piano concerto is scored for solo piano and an orchestra of 2 flutes, 2 oboes, 2 clarinets, 2 bassoons, 4 French horn, 2 trumpets, 3 trombones, timpani, triangle, harp, and strings.

There are four movements

1. Moderato (E major, about 12'00")
2. Andante (C♯ minor, about 08'30")
3. Scherzo. Vivace (C♯ minor – D♭ major, around 06'30")
4. Allegro deciso (E major, around 09'00")

=== I. Moderato ===
This composition opens with what may be taken as its principal theme, inasmuch as it furnishes most of the material for the development, and also reappears in the last movement as a climax to the whole work. The announcement of this resolute subject by flutes, oboes, clarinets and bassoons accompanied lightly by horns, violas, cellos and contrabasses is followed by a short solo cadenza, after which the unfolding of the musical picture begins. As this proceeds, several subsidiary melodies come to notice, prominent among them being one which—while hinted at before—does not assume its formal shape until given out, grazioso, by the pianoforte alone following a short upward chromatic scale passage. This graceful subject also figures conspicuously in the development which, after passing through a succession of interesting stages, culminates in a rousing climax.

=== II. Andante ===
Marked Andante, the second movement is an eloquent, nocturne-like effusion, of which the principal thematic element is the expressive subject given out softly at the commencement by the clarinet, and bassoons, staccato, and the strings, pizzicato – this being taken up shortly and carried on by the solo instrument. A contrasting intermediary section follows, after which the first theme returns – now in the harp and strings against flowing figurations in the solo instrument. And lastly, a free short conclusion passage that takes us to the third movement.

=== III. Scherzo. Vivace ===
The scherzo, marked Vivace, is a sparkling composition in Moszkowski's characteristically brilliant manner. This busy movement commences with the statement of a nimble running theme by the solo instrument, which is developed and extended into many different guises throughout the movement.

=== IV. Allegro deciso ===
The finale opens with a short flourishing introductory passage which leads to the statement of a resolute theme by the solo instrument. After this has been developed at considerable length the pianoforte introduces a contrasting theme of flowing character, to which the clarinet attaches itself shortly. Presently the development of the resolute opening theme is resumed, leading to the entrance of still another subject, given out softy but decidedly by the clarinet and the violas, and worked up forthwith in alternation and combination with the resolute opening theme. The flowing second theme returns, the movement mounting thence to a climax, at the pinnacle of which the resolute opening theme of the first movement reappears in enlarged rhythm.

== Recordings ==
Year	Pianist	Orchestra	Conductor
1987	David Bar-Illan	Bavarian Radio Symphony Orchestra	Alfredo Antonini
1991	Piers Lane	BBC Scottish Symphony Orchestra	Jerzy Maksymiuk
1992	Michael Ponti	Hamburg Symphony Orchestra	Richard Kapp
1996	Markus Pawlik	Polish National Radio Symphony Orchestra	Antoni Wit
2013	Matti Raekalio	Tampere Philharmonic Orchestra	Leonid Grin
2015	Joseph Moog	German Radio Philharmonic Orchestra Saarbrücken Kaiserslautern	Nicholas Milton

== See also ==
- List of compositions by Moritz Moszkowski
