= Dance (surname) =

Dance is a surname. Notable people with the surname include:

== Born before 1900 ==
- William Dance (1755–1840), English pianist and violinist
- Nathaniel Dance, (1748–1827), English sailor and commodore
- Nathaniel Dance-Holland (1735–1811), English portrait painter and politician
- George Dance the Younger (1741–1825), English architect and surveyor
- George Dance the Elder (1695–1768), English architect

== Born after 1900 ==
- Adam Dance (born 1992), British Liberal Democrat politician
- Karol Dance (born 1987), Chilean television presenter
- Seb Dance (born 1981), British Labour Party politician
- Lada Dance (born 1966), Russian jazz and dance music singer
- Suzanne Dance, Australian architect
- Sarah Dance, American swimmer
- George Dance (politician), leader of the Libertarian Party of Canada 1991–1993
- Trevor Dance (born 1958), English football goalkeeper
- Steve Dance (born 1957), British racing driver
- Terrance Arthur (Terry) Dance (born 1952), Canadian suffragan bishop
- Charles Dance (born 1946), British actor
- Bill Dance (television host) (born 1940), American fisherman
- Stanley Dance (1910–1999), British jazz writer, business manager, record producer, and historian of the Swing era
- James Dance (1907–1981), British Conservative Party politician
