= Dance, Dance, Dance =

Dance, Dance, Dance may refer to:

== Songs ==
- "Dance, Dance, Dance" (The Beach Boys song), a 1964 song by the Beach Boys
- "Dance, Dance, Dance" (Neil Young song), a song by Neil Young first released by Crazy Horse on their 1971 debut album and covered by The New Seekers in 1972
- "Dance, Dance, Dance (Yowsah, Yowsah, Yowsah)", a 1977 song by Chic
- "Dance Dance Dance" (James Cottriall song), a 2013 song by James Cottriall
- "Dance Dance Dance" (E-girls song), released 2015
- "Dance Dance Dance/My Lady", a 2012 single by Boyfriend
- "Dance Dance Dance", a song by Beth Anderson from the soundtrack of the 1983 film Scarface
- "Dance, Dance, Dance", a 1957 B-side by The Dells on "Why Do You Have to Go/Dance, Dance, Dance"
- "Dance, Dance, Dance", a 2001 song by S Club 7 from the album Sunshine
- "Dance, Dance, Dance", a 2008 song by Lykke Li from the album Youth Novels
- "Dance, Dance, Dance", a 2011 song by Red Hot Chili Peppers from I'm with You
- "Dance Dance Dance", a song on the Steve Miller Band album Fly Like an Eagle

== Other ==
- Dance Dance Dance (German TV series), a German television series
- Dance Dance Dance (British TV series), a British television series
- Dance Dance Dance (novel), a 1988 novel by Haruki Murakami
- Dance, Dance, Dance: The Best of Chic, a 1999 album by Chic

== See also ==
- Dance, Dance (disambiguation)
