= List of compositions by Moritz Moszkowski =

Moritz Moszkowski
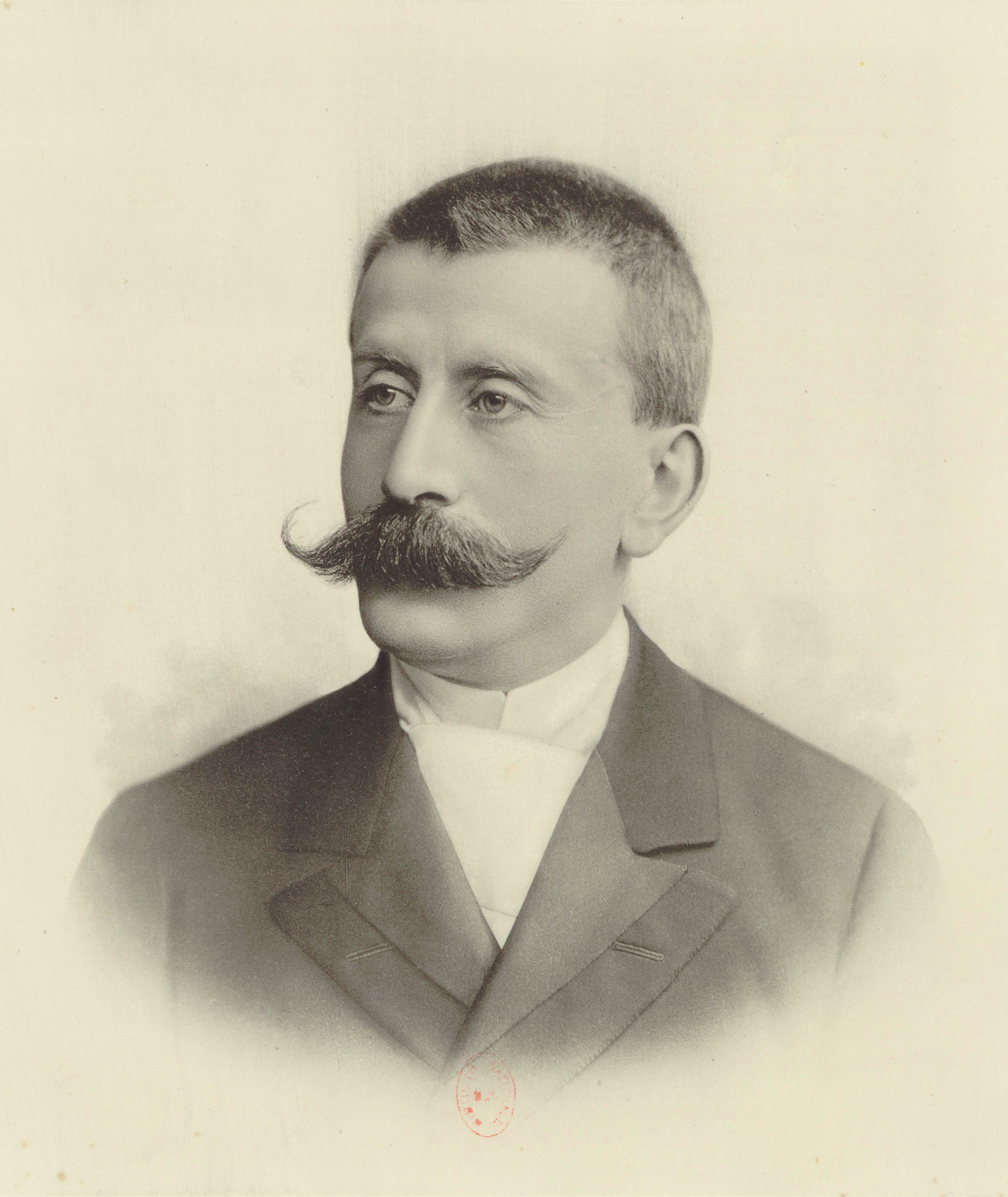
- Piano Concerto No. 2, Op. 59, 2nd movement

Background information
- Born: 23 August 1854; Breslau, Kingdom of Prussia, German Confederation
- Died: 4 March 1925 (aged 70) Paris, French Third Republic
- Genres: Classical, Romantic era
- Occupations: Pianist, composer
- Instrument: Piano

The following is the complete list of compositions by Moritz Moszkowski.

MoszWV means Moszkowski Werkverzeichnis (=Moszkowski work directory).

== Genre ==
Piano left hand
Piano 2 hands
Piano 4 hands
Two pianos 4 hands
Stage music
Vocal music
Duo
Trio
Quintet
Organ
Orchestra with solo instrument
Orchestra without solo instrument

== Works with opus number ==
Title	Opus	Name	Key	Tempo	Ge	Year	Note
Scherzo	1	—	B♭ major	Quasi andantino		1874	(Note: MoszWV 1 → A scherzo composed under Moszkowski's alternative name: Anton Notenquetscher. Published by Simon.)
Albumblatt	2	—	A♭ major	Moderato e grazioso		1875	(Note: MoszWV 2 → Album leaf is a short instrumental composition usually for piano, and quite often light in character. Published by Hainauer.)
Piano Concerto No. 1	3	First movement	B minor	Allegro con spirito		1874	(Note: MoszWV 160 → Moszkowski began working in his first Piano concerto, with the orchestra consisting of piano, 1 piccolo, 2 flutes, 2 oboes (English horn), 2 clarinets, 2 bassoons, 4 horns, 2 trumpets, 3 trombones, timpani, triangle, violin 1, violin 2, violas, cellos, and double basses, in 1873 at the age of 19 (Moszkowski played this composition, with Franz Liszt on the second piano, in a matinee in Weimar, prompting him to praise Moszkowski admiringly). While Moszkowski later dismissed his Opus. 3 as worthless, he called his Piano Concerto in E major, Op. 59, his best work. In a letter to his publisher in April 1875, Moszkowski said: "I should be happy to send you my piano concerto but for two reasons: first, it is worthless; second, it is most convenient (the score being four hundred pages long) for making my piano stool higher when I am engaged in studying better works." Dedicated to Franz Liszt, it was neglected in an archive at the Bibliothèque nationale de France for 140 years, until the manuscript was found three years prior to its premiere performance at the National Philharmonic Hall in Warsaw, Poland, with the Rzeszow Philharmonic Orchestra conducted by Vladimir Kiradjiev, and soloist Ludmil Angelov, on January 9, 2014. It was then published by Symétrie, Lyon.)
Piano Concerto No. 1	3	Second movement	G major	Adagio		1874	
Piano Concerto No. 1	3	Third movement	E major	Scherzo molto vivace		1874	
Piano Concerto No. 1	3	Fourth movement	B minor	Allegro con spirito l'istesso tempo		1874	
Caprice	4	—	A minor	Vivo		1875	(Note: MoszWV 3 → Caprice is an instrumental free form musical composition with improvisatory style. Dedicated to Frau Helene v. Schack née v. Lynker. Published by Hainauer.)
Hommage à Schumann	5	—	E♭ major	Allegro con brio		1875	(Note: MoszWV 5 → Fantasie is a free composition written according to the composer's imagination. Published by Hainauer.)
Fantasie-Impromptu	6	—	F major	Allegretto grazioso		1875	(Note: MoszWV 5 → Fantasie-Impromptu is a free-style composition. Composed and dedicated to Mademoiselle Johanna Wenzel. Published by Simon.)
Fantasie-Impromptu	6	—	G minor	L’istesso tempo		1875	(Note: MoszWV 5 → Fantasie-Impromptu is a free-style composition. Composed and dedicated to Mademoiselle Johanna Wenzel. Published by Simon.)
Fantasie-Impromptu	6	—	D minor	Tempo I (Allegretto grazioso)		1875	(Note: MoszWV 5 → Fantasie-Impromptu is a free-style composition. Composed and dedicated to Mademoiselle Johanna Wenzel. Published by Simon.)
Trois Moments Musicaux	7	No. 1	B major	Allegramente		1875	(Note: MoszWV 6 → A free composition published by Hainauer.)
Trois Moments Musicaux	7	No. 2	C♯ minor	Con moto		1875	(Note: MoszWV 6 → A free composition published by Hainauer.)
Trois Moments Musicaux	7	No. 3	F♯ major	Tranquillo e semplice		1875	(Note: MoszWV 6 → A free composition published by Hainauer.)
Fünf Walzer	8	No. 1	A major	Allegro moderato		1875	(Note: MoszWV 100 → Moszkowski began writing his first composition for piano four hands on 4 November 1875 (published in 1876), likely dedicated to Dr. Alfred Pringsheim most probably because the Trois Moments Musicaux, Op. 7 (MoszWV 6), had already been dedicated to Constantin Sternberg. After the success of this composition, and the subsequent Op. 11, it was natural for Moszkowski to write even more pieces for piano four hands. Published by Simon.)
Fünf Walzer	8	No. 2	A minor	Pesante e lugubre		1875	(Note: MoszWV 100 → Moszkowski began writing his first composition for piano four hands on 4 November 1875 (published in 1876), likely dedicated to Dr. Alfred Pringsheim most probably because the Trois Moments Musicaux, Op. 7 (MoszWV 6), had already been dedicated to Constantin Sternberg. After the success of this composition, and the subsequent Op. 11, it was natural for Moszkowski to write even more pieces for piano four hands. Published by Simon.)
Fünf Walzer	8	No. 3	E major	Allegro grazioso		1875	(Note: MoszWV 100 → Moszkowski began writing his first composition for piano four hands on 4 November 1875 (published in 1876), likely dedicated to Dr. Alfred Pringsheim most probably because the Trois Moments Musicaux, Op. 7 (MoszWV 6), had already been dedicated to Constantin Sternberg. After the success of this composition, and the subsequent Op. 11, it was natural for Moszkowski to write even more pieces for piano four hands. Published by Simon.)
Fünf Walzer	8	No. 4	G major	Vivace assai		1875	(Note: MoszWV 100 → Moszkowski began writing his first composition for piano four hands on 4 November 1875 (published in 1876), likely dedicated to Dr. Alfred Pringsheim most probably because the Trois Moments Musicaux, Op. 7 (MoszWV 6), had already been dedicated to Constantin Sternberg. After the success of this composition, and the subsequent Op. 11, it was natural for Moszkowski to write even more pieces for piano four hands. Published by Simon.)
Fünf Walzer	8	No. 5	D major	Pomposo ed energico, ma non troppo allegro		1875	(Note: MoszWV 100 → Moszkowski began writing his first composition for piano four hands on 4 November 1875 (published in 1876), likely dedicated to Dr. Alfred Pringsheim most probably because the Trois Moments Musicaux, Op. 7 (MoszWV 6), had already been dedicated to Constantin Sternberg. After the success of this composition, and the subsequent Op. 11, it was natural for Moszkowski to write even more pieces for piano four hands. Published by Simon.)
Fünf Walzer	8a	Idem	Idem	Idem		1875	(Note: MoszWV 80a → Arranged for piano two hands. Published by Simon. Arrangement for MoszWV 80a was probably written the same year as MoszWV 100.)
Zwei Lieder	9	Die Verlassene	C	Allegretto		1876	(Note: MoszWV 170 → A composition for soprano (Regina Moszkowska was for one year (probably 1902) singing teacher at the Stern Conservatory in Berlin) and piano with libretto by Wilhelm Sachs. No. 1 complete title is Die Verlassene: "Einsam dort am Bache kauert, and no. 2 is Schlaflied: "Schlaf, Bubchen, schlaf" with respective high key in D major, middle in C major, and low in B major. Published by Julius Hainauer.)
Zwei Lieder	9	Schlaflied (Berceuse)	D major	Andante		1876	(Note: MoszWV 170 → A composition for soprano (Regina Moszkowska was for one year (probably 1902) singing teacher at the Stern Conservatory in Berlin) and piano with libretto by Wilhelm Sachs. No. 1 complete title is Die Verlassene: "Einsam dort am Bache kauert, and no. 2 is Schlaflied: "Schlaf, Bubchen, schlaf" with respective high key in D major, middle in C major, and low in B major. Published by Julius Hainauer.)
Skizzen, Vier Kleine Stücke	10	Melodie	G♭ major	Con moto		1876	(Note: MoszWV 7 → Four little pieces for piano published by Hainauer. No. 4 is translated as: Sachs, a family surname.)
Skizzen, Vier Kleine Stücke	10	Thema	E major	Tranquillo ed espressivo		1876	(Note: MoszWV 7 → Four little pieces for piano published by Hainauer. No. 4 is translated as: Sachs, a family surname.)
Skizzen, Vier Kleine Stücke	10	Mazurka	G major	Allegro		1876	(Note: MoszWV 7 → Four little pieces for piano published by Hainauer. No. 4 is translated as: Sachs, a family surname.)
Skizzen, Vier Kleine Stücke	10	Impromptu über Sachs	G minor	Allegro assai		1876	(Note: MoszWV 7 → Four little pieces for piano published by Hainauer. No. 4 is translated as: Sachs, a family surname.)
Drei Stücke	11	Polonaise	E♭ major	Brioso ed energico		1876	(Note: MoszWV 101 → A composition for piano four hands published by Hainauer. Dedicated to his friend Carl Wittkowsky.)
Drei Stücke	11	Walzer	G major	Allegretto grazioso		1876	(Note: MoszWV 101 → A composition for piano four hands published by Hainauer. Dedicated to his friend Carl Wittkowsky.)
Drei Stücke	11	Ungarischer Tanz	B Minor	Allegro con fuoco		1876	(Note: MoszWV 101 → A composition for piano four hands published by Hainauer. Dedicated to his friend Carl Wittkowsky.)
Spanische Tänze	12	Flamenco (Gypsy Dance)	C major	Allegro brioso		1876	(Note: MoszWV 102 → A composition for piano four hands dedicated to his brother Alexander Moszkowski. Later publishers found, among other things, a new title for every piece: No. 1 Madrid, No. 2 Sevilla, No. 3 Barcelona, No. 4 Valencia, No. 5 Málaga. They were published by Simon. In 1902 Moszkowski wrote: I think it was about the middle of my seventeenth year that, as often happens to both old and young musicians, I was in sore need of money. I could think of only two ways to get what I wanted: to borrow or to compose something. After turning over, for several days, the advantages and disadvantages of both ways of bettering my circumstances, I concluded I would borrow. Therefore, I went to those two of my colleagues with whom I was on most familiar terms: Philipp and Xaver Scharwenka, in hope that I should not find their fortunes at so low an ebb. Philipp was at home, sitting on a sofa and smoking a pipe. I sat down by him and asked if he had a cigar. He said that he was out of cigars, but that I could smoke a pipe. So I took a pipe and looked around for tobacco, but sought and sought in vain. Finally Philipp said: "You needn’t hunt hunt any longer, Moritz; there is no tobacco here." Then I began to grow a little angry and said: "Do you know, Philipp, that is drawing it rather strong? You offer me an empty pipe, let me look for tobacco in vain and then coolly tell me there is none here, and yet you yourself are smoking. Give me some tobacco." "If you will smoke what I am smoking, I am satisfied." answered Philipp, who emptied his pipe and prepared anew by drawing out a hole in the sofa some of the sea-grass used to stuff it, which he put in his pipe. For a moment I was speechless with astonishment. Now it was clear that I could not borrow money from a man who was using his sofa for smoking. I went back home, sat down at my table, and began to look through my sketch book. A motive of Spanish character struck my eyes, and at the same moment arose the thought that I would write a set of Spanish dances. I worked rapidly, and in several days had finished my Opus 12, the Spanish Dances for four hands. I had only the last few notes to write as [Xaver] Scharwenka stepped into my room. "Good day, Moritz," he said; "you may be glad that you need not to go out, for it is wretched weather." "Since we are speaking of wretched things," said I, "what are you composing now?" "Oh, nothing," said Xaver, who was accustomed to this kind of conversational tone from me; "but you appear to be at work: do you need money?" Right you are," said I, "and you can do me a service by playing through these four-hand pieces and telling me what you think of them." We tried the dances, and then Xaver said: "I would rather have lent you some money, so that you would not have had to compose." But that was only a return thrust. An hour later I called on Simon the publisher, who promised to let me know in a few days if he would bring the pieces out. When I saw him several days later he said he had shown the pieces to several experienced critics and they had advised him to take them. The question now was, what I wanted from them. "I have a brilliant idea," I said: "I propose that you pay me an exceptionally good price which will get talked about in the papers and thus make a big stir about the pieces." But it made no impression on the publisher. He thought that so pretty pieces needed no such advertising, and besides that, Beethoven, Mozart, Schubert and others always had sold their compositions cheaply, and as a publisher he felt obliged to accept such traditions. In vain I sought to change his mind by suggesting that he ought not to compare me with Beethoven; he would listen to no distinction between us in that respect, and paid me a small price with which I finally withdrew, tolerably well satisfied, at least, to be relieved of my present necessities. When the Spanish Dances were published, several weeks later, they found a good sale. Some years later they were known everywhere, being taken up in various editions and arrangements. I consider this as one of the works which first made me known to the musical world in general. Of course the publisher profited largely by it, and all because Philipp Scharwenka had no tobacco and could not lend me money.)
Spanische Tänze	12	Romance in Córdoba	G minor	Moderato		1876	
Spanische Tänze	12	Juana (Andalusian Vito)	A major	Con moto		1876	
Spanische Tänze	12	Malagueña	B♭ major	Allegro comodo		1876	
Spanische Tänze	12	Bolero	D major	Con spirito		1876	
Spanische Tänze	12a	Idem	Idem	Idem		1876	(Note: MoszWV 102a → Chamber music for clarinet and piano, first published by Bote & Bock. It was orchestrated by Philipp Scharwenka (No. 2 and No. 5) and Valentin Frank (No. 1, No. 3 and No. 4) in 1880. Published by Edition Peters.)
Drei Lieder	13	Bitte: Weil auf mir, du dunkles Auge	D major	Molto moderato		1877	(Note: MoszWV 171 → A composition for soprano and piano. No. 1 uses a text by Nikolaus Lenau, No. 2 by Heinrich Heine, and No. 3. Julius Wolff. Published by Hainauer.)
Drei Lieder	13	Und wüssten's die Blumen	E♭ minor	Andante melancolico		1877	(Note: MoszWV 171 → A composition for soprano and piano. No. 1 uses a text by Nikolaus Lenau, No. 2 by Heinrich Heine, and No. 3. Julius Wolff. Published by Hainauer.)
Drei Lieder	13	Mädchenaug'! Mädchenaug'!	D major	Con vivacita		1877	(Note: MoszWV 171 → A composition for soprano and piano. No. 1 uses a text by Nikolaus Lenau, No. 2 by Heinrich Heine, and No. 3. Julius Wolff. Published by Hainauer.)
Humoreske	14	—	D major	Allegro fastoso		1877	(Note: MoszWV 8 → A Humoresque composition characterized by pieces with fanciful humor. Dedicated to Xaver Scharwenka. Published by Hainauer.)
Sechs Stücke	15	Serenata	D major	Andante grazioso		1877	(Note: MoszWV 9 → A composition for piano solo. No. 1 Serenata was the first revised, personally corrected by the composer himself, Moritz Moszkowski, and authorized edition ever published in an American magazine (The Ladies' Home Journal, No. 8, July 1905). Published by Hainauer.)
Sechs Stücke	15	Arabeske	G major	Allegro molto		1877	(Note: MoszWV 9 → A composition for piano solo. No. 1 Serenata was the first revised, personally corrected by the composer himself, Moritz Moszkowski, and authorized edition ever published in an American magazine (The Ladies' Home Journal, No. 8, July 1905). Published by Hainauer.)
Sechs Stücke	15	Mazurka	G minor	Allegro		1877	(Note: MoszWV 9 → A composition for piano solo. No. 1 Serenata was the first revised, personally corrected by the composer himself, Moritz Moszkowski, and authorized edition ever published in an American magazine (The Ladies' Home Journal, No. 8, July 1905). Published by Hainauer.)
Sechs Stücke	15	Canon	D major	Con moto		1877	(Note: MoszWV 9 → A composition for piano solo. No. 1 Serenata was the first revised, personally corrected by the composer himself, Moritz Moszkowski, and authorized edition ever published in an American magazine (The Ladies' Home Journal, No. 8, July 1905). Published by Hainauer.)
Sechs Stücke	15	Walzer	D♭ major	Molto moderato		1877	(Note: MoszWV 9 → A composition for piano solo. No. 1 Serenata was the first revised, personally corrected by the composer himself, Moritz Moszkowski, and authorized edition ever published in an American magazine (The Ladies' Home Journal, No. 8, July 1905). Published by Hainauer.)
Sechs Stücke	15	Barcarole	A minor	Andante semplice		1877	(Note: MoszWV 9 → A composition for piano solo. No. 1 Serenata was the first revised, personally corrected by the composer himself, Moritz Moszkowski, and authorized edition ever published in an American magazine (The Ladies' Home Journal, No. 8, July 1905). Published by Hainauer.)
Sechs Stücke	15a	Serenata	Idem	Idem		1911	(Note: MoszWV 9a → A composition for piano 4 hands (after Op. 15, No. 1). Published by Hainauer.)
Sechs Stücke	15b	Waltzer	Idem	Idem		1902	(Note: MoszWV 9b → Chamber music for cello and piano (after Op. 15, No. 5). Published by Hainauer.)
Zwei Konzertstücke	16	Ballade	G minor	Andante con moto		1878	(Note: MoszWV 130 → Chamber music originally composed for violin and piano and published with a companion piece, a Bolero, Op 16, No 2. No. 1 Ballade has for tempo Andante con moto (part 1), and Tempo animato, quasi allegro (part 2). This is Moszkowski earliest orchestral work (Spanish Dances, Op 12, which appeared earlier, was orchestrated by Philipp Scharwenka and Valentin Frank). No. 1 was dedicated to German composer and violin-virtuoso Gustav Hille (born 21 May 1851), who had studied at the Kullak Academy along with Moszkowski, and No. 2 Bolero to Fräulein Marianne Stresow. Published by Hainauer.)
Zwei Konzertstücke	16	Bolero	D major	Allegro spiritoso		1878	
Zwei Konzertstücke	16a	Ballade	Idem	Idem		1878	(Note: MoszWV 130a → A ballad for violin and orchestra (after Op. 16) composed of 2 flutes, 2 oboes, 2 clarinets, 2 bassoons, 2 horns, 2 trumpets, timpani, harp (opt), and strings. It was dedicated to Marianne Stresow two years prior to her marriage with Philipp Scharwenka (1847-1917). Published by Hainauer.)
Drei Klavierstücke in Tanzform	17	Polonaise	D major	Allegro con fuoco		1878	(Note: MoszWV 10 → A composition for piano. Published by Hainauer.)
Drei Klavierstücke in Tanzform	17	Menuett	G major	Allegro moderato		1878	(Note: MoszWV 10 → A composition for piano. Published by Hainauer.)
Drei Klavierstücke in Tanzform	17	Waltzer	A major	Molto allegro		1878	(Note: MoszWV 10 → A composition for piano. Published by Hainauer.)
Drei Klavierstücke in Tanzform	17a	Menuett	Idem	Idem		1878	(Note: MoszWV 10a → A Minuet for piano four hands (after Op. 17, No. 2). Published by Hainauer.)
Fünf Klavierstücke	18	Melodie	F major	Moderato		1878	(Note: MoszWV 11 → A composition for piano solo. Published by Hainauer.)
Fünf Klavierstücke	18	Scherzino	F major	Allegro		1878	(Note: MoszWV 11 → A composition for piano solo. Published by Hainauer.)
Fünf Klavierstücke	18	Étude	G major	Con agilita		1878	(Note: MoszWV 11 → A composition for piano solo. Published by Hainauer.)
Fünf Klavierstücke	18	Marcia	G major	Allegro moderato		1878	(Note: MoszWV 11 → A composition for piano solo. Published by Hainauer.)
Fünf Klavierstücke	18	Polonaise	B♭ major	Con grazia		1878	(Note: MoszWV 11 → A composition for piano solo. Published by Hainauer.)
Fünf Klavierstücke	18a	Melodie	Idem	Idem		1878	(Note: MoszWV 11a → Chamber music for cello and piano (after Op. 18, No. 1). Published by Hainauer.)
Johanna d'Arc	19	First movement	E major	Allegro comodo		1875–76	(Note: MoszWV 140 → A Symphonic Poem in four movements from Friedrich Schiller's Jungfrau von Orleans for orchestra (piccolo, 2 flutes, 2 oboes, 2 clarinets, 3 bassoons, 4 horns, 3 trumpets, 3 trombones, timpani, percussion, harp, and strings) without solo instrument. Titles read: No. 1 Joan's pastoral life. A vision brings them to awareness of their high position, No. 2 Internal discord - back memories, No. 3 Enter the winner to be crowned in Rheims, No. 4 Joan in captivity. Victory, death and transfiguration. The premiere of this composition was held in the Berlin Symphony Chapel under the direction of Franz Mannstädt on 23 February 1877, and the British premiere at St. James Hall in London, where he conducted the Philharmonic Society Orchestra on May 20, 1885. It was the first of a series of six concerts that he should give for the Company. Dedicated to his friend Philipp Scharwenka, it was published by Hainauer, appearing in print two years later.)
Johanna d'Arc	19	Second movement	E major	Andante malinconico		1875–76	
Johanna d'Arc	19	Third movement	E major	Molto moderato		1875–76	
Johanna d'Arc	19	Fourth movement	E major	Allegro molto		1875–76	
Johanna d'Arc	19a	Prozessionsmarsch aus Johanna d‘Arc	Idem	Idem		1879	(Note: MoszWV 140a → A composition for two pianos. Published by Hainauer.)
Allegro Scherzando	20	—	E major	Allegro		1879	(Note: MoszWV 12 → A Scherzo for piano. Dedicated to Monsieur Jules Zarębski. Published by Hainauer.)
Album Espagnol	21	—	G major	Allegro moderato		1879	(Note: MoszWV 103 → A composition for piano four hands. Published by Hainauer.)
Album Espagnol	21	—	D major	Vivace assai		1879	(Note: MoszWV 103 → A composition for piano four hands. Published by Hainauer.)
Album Espagnol	21	—	F♯ minor	Con moto		1879	(Note: MoszWV 103 → A composition for piano four hands. Published by Hainauer.)
Album Espagnol	21	—	D major	Moderato e grazioso		1879	(Note: MoszWV 103 → A composition for piano four hands. Published by Hainauer.)
Tränen. Fünf Gedichte von Adelbert von Chamisso	22	Was ist's, o Vater, was ich verbrach?	D major	Allegro molto		1879	(Note: MoszWV 172 → A composition for voice and piano dedicated to Frau Dr. Arthur Levysohn. It was published by Hainauer.)
Tränen. Fünf Gedichte von Adelbert von Chamisso	22	Ich habe, bevor der Morgen	D major	Molto moderato		1879	(Note: MoszWV 172 → A composition for voice and piano dedicated to Frau Dr. Arthur Levysohn. It was published by Hainauer.)
Tränen. Fünf Gedichte von Adelbert von Chamisso	22	Nicht der Tau und nicht der Regen	D major	Allegro appassionato		1879	(Note: MoszWV 172 → A composition for voice and piano dedicated to Frau Dr. Arthur Levysohn. It was published by Hainauer.)
Tränen. Fünf Gedichte von Adelbert von Chamisso	22	Denke, denke, mein Geliebter	B major	Andante con moto		1879	(Note: MoszWV 172 → A composition for voice and piano dedicated to Frau Dr. Arthur Levysohn. It was published by Hainauer.)
Tränen. Fünf Gedichte von Adelbert von Chamisso	22	Wie so bleich ich geworden bin?	G major	Allegretto		1879	(Note: MoszWV 172 → A composition for voice and piano dedicated to Frau Dr. Arthur Levysohn. It was published by Hainauer.)
Aus aller Herren Länder	23	Russland	A minor	Allegretto		1879	(Note: MoszWV 104 → A composition for piano four hands later orchestrated by the composer. Also published for piano solo. Published by Hainauer.)
Aus aller Herren Länder	23	Deutschland	F major	Andante		1879	(Note: MoszWV 104 → A composition for piano four hands later orchestrated by the composer. Also published for piano solo. Published by Hainauer.)
Aus aller Herren Länder	23	Spanien	A minor	Molto vivace		1879	(Note: MoszWV 104 → A composition for piano four hands later orchestrated by the composer. Also published for piano solo. Published by Hainauer.)
Aus aller Herren Länder	23	Polen	C♯ minor	Allegro con fuoco		1879	(Note: MoszWV 104 → A composition for piano four hands later orchestrated by the composer. Also published for piano solo. Published by Hainauer.)
Aus aller Herren Länder	23	Italien	A major	Presto		1879	(Note: MoszWV 104 → A composition for piano four hands later orchestrated by the composer. Also published for piano solo. Published by Hainauer.)
Aus aller Herren Länder	23	Ungarn	D major	Molto allegro		1879	(Note: MoszWV 104 → A composition for piano four hands later orchestrated by the composer. Also published for piano solo. Published by Hainauer.)
Aus aller Herren Länder	23a	Idem	Idem	Idem		1884	(Note: MoszWV 104a → A composition for orchestra. Published by Hainauer.)
Aus aller Herren Länder	23b	Russisch	Idem	Idem		1879	(Note: MoszWV 104b → Chamber music for cello and piano (after Op. 23, No. 1). Published by Hainauer.)
Drei Konzertetüden	24	No. 1 Les Vague	G♭ major	Allegro patetico		1880	(Note: MoszWV 13 → An Étude for piano and orchestra. Dedicated to Theodor Kullak. Published by Hainauer.)
Drei Konzertetüden	24	No. 2 Il Lamento	C♯ minor	Moderato assai		1880	(Note: MoszWV 13 → An Étude for piano and orchestra. Dedicated to Theodor Kullak. Published by Hainauer.)
Drei Konzertetüden	24	No. 3	C major	Vivace		1880	(Note: MoszWV 13 → An Étude for piano and orchestra. Dedicated to Theodor Kullak. Published by Hainauer.)
Deutsche Reigen	25	—	D major	Moderato		1880	(Note: MoszWV 105 → A composition for piano four hands. Published by Hainauer.)
Deutsche Reigen	25	—	A major	Allegretto con moto		1880	(Note: MoszWV 105 → A composition for piano four hands. Published by Hainauer.)
Deutsche Reigen	25	—	F major	Moderato e grazioso		1880	(Note: MoszWV 105 → A composition for piano four hands. Published by Hainauer.)
Deutsche Reigen	25	—	A♭ major	Allegro animato		1880	(Note: MoszWV 105 → A composition for piano four hands. Published by Hainauer.)
Deutsche Reigen	25	—	E♭ major	Allegro con brio, un poco meno allegro		1880	(Note: MoszWV 105 → A composition for piano four hands. Published by Hainauer.)
Drei Gedichte im Volkston	26	Ich frage nicht, hast Du mich lieb	G♭ major	Andante		1881	(Note: MoszWV 173 → A composition for voice and piano with libretto by Carl Wittkowsky. Published by Hainauer.)
Drei Gedichte im Volkston	26	O süsseste Noth, o selige Pein	C♯ minor	—		1881	(Note: MoszWV 173 → A composition for voice and piano with libretto by Carl Wittkowsky. Published by Hainauer.)
Drei Gedichte im Volkston	26	Auf, hinaus aus dem Haus	C major	—		1881	(Note: MoszWV 173 → A composition for voice and piano with libretto by Carl Wittkowsky. Published by Hainauer.)
Barcarole und Tarantelle	27	Barcarole	G major	Allegro con moto		1881	(Note: MoszWV 14 → A composition entitled Barcarole and Tarantelle for piano. Dedicated to Baroness Henriette Senfft von Pilsach. Published by Hainauer.)
Barcarole und Tarantelle	27	Tarantelle	G♭ major	Presto		1881	(Note: MoszWV 14 → A composition entitled Barcarole and Tarantelle for piano. Dedicated to Baroness Henriette Senfft von Pilsach. Published by Hainauer.)
Miniaturen	28	—	G major	Allegro moderato		1882	(Note: MoszWV 15 → A small scale composition for piano. Dedicated to his friend Monsieur Henri Steinkühler. Published by Hainauer.)
Miniaturen	28	—	C major	Allegro giocoso		1882	(Note: MoszWV 15 → A small scale composition for piano. Dedicated to his friend Monsieur Henri Steinkühler. Published by Hainauer.)
Miniaturen	28	—	E minor	Vivace con spirito		1882	(Note: MoszWV 15 → A small scale composition for piano. Dedicated to his friend Monsieur Henri Steinkühler. Published by Hainauer.)
Miniaturen	28	—	E major	Allegretto grazioso		1882	(Note: MoszWV 15 → A small scale composition for piano. Dedicated to his friend Monsieur Henri Steinkühler. Published by Hainauer.)
Miniaturen	28	—	G major	Molto allegro		1882	(Note: MoszWV 15 → A small scale composition for piano. Dedicated to his friend Monsieur Henri Steinkühler. Published by Hainauer.)
Drei Stücke	29	Air	G major	Tranquillo e cantabile		1882	(Note: MoszWV 131 → Chamber music for cello and piano. Published by Hainauer.)
Drei Stücke	29	Tarentelle	B major	Molto vivace		1882	(Note: MoszWV 131 → Chamber music for cello and piano. Published by Hainauer.)
Drei Stücke	29	Berceuse	F major	Andante		1882	(Note: MoszWV 131 → Chamber music for cello and piano. Published by Hainauer.)
Violin Concerto	30	First movement	C major	Allegro commodo		1883	(Note: MoszWV 161 → A composition in three movements for violin and orchestra composed of 2 flutes, 2 oboes, 2 clarinets, 2 bassoons, 4 horns, 2 trumpets, timpani, and strings. Dedicated to Émile Sauret. Published by Bote & Bock.)
Violin Concerto	30	Second movement	E minor	Andante		1883	(Note: MoszWV 161 → A composition in three movements for violin and orchestra composed of 2 flutes, 2 oboes, 2 clarinets, 2 bassoons, 4 horns, 2 trumpets, timpani, and strings. Dedicated to Émile Sauret. Published by Bote & Bock.)
Violin Concerto	30	Third movement	C major	Vivace		1883	(Note: MoszWV 161 → A composition in three movements for violin and orchestra composed of 2 flutes, 2 oboes, 2 clarinets, 2 bassoons, 4 horns, 2 trumpets, timpani, and strings. Dedicated to Émile Sauret. Published by Bote & Bock.)
Violin Concerto	30a	Idem	Idem	Idem		1883	(Note: MoszWV 161a → Chamber music for violin and piano. Published by Bote & Bock.)
Six Morceaux	31	Monologue	E minor	Andante sostenuto		1883	(Note: MoszWV 16 → A set of morceaux for piano. No. 4 was also arranged for two pianos 8 hands by F. Brissler. Published by Ries & Erler.)
Six Morceaux	31	Mélodie	G major	Molto vivace		1883	(Note: MoszWV 16 → A set of morceaux for piano. No. 4 was also arranged for two pianos 8 hands by F. Brissler. Published by Ries & Erler.)
Six Morceaux	31	Valse mélancolique	B♭ major	Moderato		1883	(Note: MoszWV 16 → A set of morceaux for piano. No. 4 was also arranged for two pianos 8 hands by F. Brissler. Published by Ries & Erler.)
Six Morceaux	31	Scherzetto	A♭ major	Allegro con spirito		1883	(Note: MoszWV 16 → A set of morceaux for piano. No. 4 was also arranged for two pianos 8 hands by F. Brissler. Published by Ries & Erler.)
Six Morceaux	31	Impromptu	D♭ major	Tranquillo, ma non troppo lento		1883	(Note: MoszWV 16 → A set of morceaux for piano. No. 4 was also arranged for two pianos 8 hands by F. Brissler. Published by Ries & Erler.)
Six Morceaux	31	Caprice	G major	Allegretto		1883	(Note: MoszWV 16 → A set of morceaux for piano. No. 4 was also arranged for two pianos 8 hands by F. Brissler. Published by Ries & Erler.)
Six Morceaux	31a	Scherzetto	Idem	Idem		1883	(Note: MoszWV 16a → A Scherzino for two pianos 4 hands (after Op. 31, No. 4). Published by Ries & Erler.)
Six Morceaux	31b	Caprice	Idem	Idem		1883	(Note: MoszWV 16b → A Capriccio for two pianos 4 hands (after Op. 31, No. 6). Published by Ries & Erler.)
Drei Klavierstücke	32	In tempo di minuetto	E major	Moderato		1883	(Note: MoszWV 17 → A composition for piano dedicated to his friend Austrian pianist and composer Alfred Grünfeld. Published by Bote & Bock.)
Drei Klavierstücke	32	Étude	D major	Allegro		1883	(Note: MoszWV 17 → A composition for piano dedicated to his friend Austrian pianist and composer Alfred Grünfeld. Published by Bote & Bock.)
Drei Klavierstücke	32	Walzer	E major	Grazioso		1883	(Note: MoszWV 17 → A composition for piano dedicated to his friend Austrian pianist and composer Alfred Grünfeld. Published by Bote & Bock.)
Vier Klavierstücke	33	Kindermarsch	F major	Allegro		1883	(Note: MoszWV 106 → A composition for piano four hands. No. 3 is also known as Pièce drôlatique (Humorous piece) in later editions. It was first published by Hainauer.)
Vier Klavierstücke	33	Humoreske	D major	Allegretto		1883	(Note: MoszWV 106 → A composition for piano four hands. No. 3 is also known as Pièce drôlatique (Humorous piece) in later editions. It was first published by Hainauer.)
Vier Klavierstücke	33	Tarantelle	G minor	Allegro molto		1883	(Note: MoszWV 106 → A composition for piano four hands. No. 3 is also known as Pièce drôlatique (Humorous piece) in later editions. It was first published by Hainauer.)
Vier Klavierstücke	33	Spinnerlied	A major	Vivo		1883	(Note: MoszWV 106 → A composition for piano four hands. No. 3 is also known as Pièce drôlatique (Humorous piece) in later editions. It was first published by Hainauer.)
Trois Morceaux	34	Valse	E major	Allegro moderato		1884	(Note: MoszWV 18 → Morceau No. 1 was dedicated to Monsieur Théodore Ritter, No. 2. to Monsieur Louis Coenen, and No. 3. to Mademoiselle Clotilde Kleeberg. Published by Hainauer.)
Trois Morceaux	34	Étude	C major	Molto allegro		1884	(Note: MoszWV 18 → Morceau No. 1 was dedicated to Monsieur Théodore Ritter, No. 2. to Monsieur Louis Coenen, and No. 3. to Mademoiselle Clotilde Kleeberg. Published by Hainauer.)
Trois Morceaux	34	Mazurka	E major	Lento		1884	(Note: MoszWV 18 → Morceau No. 1 was dedicated to Monsieur Théodore Ritter, No. 2. to Monsieur Louis Coenen, and No. 3. to Mademoiselle Clotilde Kleeberg. Published by Hainauer.)
Trois Morceaux	34a	Valse	Idem	Idem		1884	(Note: MoszWV 18a → A waltz made easier by the composer for piano two hands. Published by Édition facilitée Hainauer.)
Quatre Morceaux	35	Caprice mélancolique	A minor	Allegretto con moto		1885	(Note: MoszWV 19 → "A composition for piano dedicated for his wife Henriette Chaminade, sister of Cécile Chaminade. Published by Hainauer. "In the 1880s, a neurological problem with Moszkowski’s arm curtailed his career as a pianist, and he became increasingly devoted to composition. In 1884, he married Henriette Chaminade, the youngest sister of Cécile Chaminade; they had two children, Marcel and Sylvia. In 1890, Henriette left Moszkowski for the poet Ludwig Fulda, and a divorce was issued 2 years later. In 1897, Moszkowski moved to Paris. Henriette died in 1900. Moszkowski’s own health deteriorated, and in 1906, he lost his 17-year-old daughter. In Berlin his home was in Genthiner Strasse, where he resided with his mother and children. The desertion of his wife, who was the pianiste Chaminade’s sister, is a subject never alluded to by him, nor does he encourage mention of it by others." Professor Bernhard Pollack (1865–1928) of Friedrich Wilhelm University, Berlin: Neurohistologist, Ophthalmologist, Pianist Lazaros C. Triarhou (2012). → Back to List of compositions by Cécile Chaminade)
Quatre Morceaux	35	Moment musical	C major	Con moto		1885	
Quatre Morceaux	35	Pièce drôlatique	G♭ major	Moderato con leggerezza		1885	
Quatre Morceaux	35	Impromptu	G major	Allegro grazioso		1885	
Huit Morceaux Caractéristiques	36	Pièce rococo	D♭ major	Moderato		1886	(Note: MoszWV 20 → Morceau No. 1 dedicated to Madame Bertha Moszkowski, wife of his brother Alexander, No. 2 to Monsieur Arthur De Greef, No. 3 to Giuseppe Buonamici, No. 4 to Józef Wieniawski, No. 5 to W. Goldner, No. 6 to Max Schwarz, No. 7 to English pianist and composer Francesco Berger, and No. 8 to Alexander Lambert. A composition for piano. Published by Hainauer.)
Huit Morceaux Caractéristiques	36	Rêverie	A♭ major	Molto tranquillo		1886	(Note: MoszWV 20 → Morceau No. 1 dedicated to Madame Bertha Moszkowski, wife of his brother Alexander, No. 2 to Monsieur Arthur De Greef, No. 3 to Giuseppe Buonamici, No. 4 to Józef Wieniawski, No. 5 to W. Goldner, No. 6 to Max Schwarz, No. 7 to English pianist and composer Francesco Berger, and No. 8 to Alexander Lambert. A composition for piano. Published by Hainauer.)
Huit Morceaux Caractéristiques	36	Expansion	D♭ major	Allegro anomato		1886	(Note: MoszWV 20 → Morceau No. 1 dedicated to Madame Bertha Moszkowski, wife of his brother Alexander, No. 2 to Monsieur Arthur De Greef, No. 3 to Giuseppe Buonamici, No. 4 to Józef Wieniawski, No. 5 to W. Goldner, No. 6 to Max Schwarz, No. 7 to English pianist and composer Francesco Berger, and No. 8 to Alexander Lambert. A composition for piano. Published by Hainauer.)
Huit Morceaux Caractéristiques	36	En automne	B♭ minor	Veloce		1886	(Note: MoszWV 20 → Morceau No. 1 dedicated to Madame Bertha Moszkowski, wife of his brother Alexander, No. 2 to Monsieur Arthur De Greef, No. 3 to Giuseppe Buonamici, No. 4 to Józef Wieniawski, No. 5 to W. Goldner, No. 6 to Max Schwarz, No. 7 to English pianist and composer Francesco Berger, and No. 8 to Alexander Lambert. A composition for piano. Published by Hainauer.)
Huit Morceaux Caractéristiques	36	Air de ballet	G minor	Allegretto		1886	(Note: MoszWV 20 → Morceau No. 1 dedicated to Madame Bertha Moszkowski, wife of his brother Alexander, No. 2 to Monsieur Arthur De Greef, No. 3 to Giuseppe Buonamici, No. 4 to Józef Wieniawski, No. 5 to W. Goldner, No. 6 to Max Schwarz, No. 7 to English pianist and composer Francesco Berger, and No. 8 to Alexander Lambert. A composition for piano. Published by Hainauer.)
Huit Morceaux Caractéristiques	36	Étincelles	B♭ major	Allegro scherzando		1886	(Note: MoszWV 20 → Morceau No. 1 dedicated to Madame Bertha Moszkowski, wife of his brother Alexander, No. 2 to Monsieur Arthur De Greef, No. 3 to Giuseppe Buonamici, No. 4 to Józef Wieniawski, No. 5 to W. Goldner, No. 6 to Max Schwarz, No. 7 to English pianist and composer Francesco Berger, and No. 8 to Alexander Lambert. A composition for piano. Published by Hainauer.)
Huit Morceaux Caractéristiques	36	Valse sentimentale	C major	Commodo		1886	(Note: MoszWV 20 → Morceau No. 1 dedicated to Madame Bertha Moszkowski, wife of his brother Alexander, No. 2 to Monsieur Arthur De Greef, No. 3 to Giuseppe Buonamici, No. 4 to Józef Wieniawski, No. 5 to W. Goldner, No. 6 to Max Schwarz, No. 7 to English pianist and composer Francesco Berger, and No. 8 to Alexander Lambert. A composition for piano. Published by Hainauer.)
Huit Morceaux Caractéristiques	36	Pièce rustique	E major	Moderato		1886	(Note: MoszWV 20 → Morceau No. 1 dedicated to Madame Bertha Moszkowski, wife of his brother Alexander, No. 2 to Monsieur Arthur De Greef, No. 3 to Giuseppe Buonamici, No. 4 to Józef Wieniawski, No. 5 to W. Goldner, No. 6 to Max Schwarz, No. 7 to English pianist and composer Francesco Berger, and No. 8 to Alexander Lambert. A composition for piano. Published by Hainauer.)
Caprice Espagnol	37	—	A minor	Vivace		1885	(Note: MoszWV 21 → A composition for piano solo dedicated to Mademoiselle Neally Stevens. Published by Peters.)
Quatre Morceaux	38	Bourrée	A major	Allegro molto		1886	(Note: MoszWV 22 → A composition for piano solo dedicated "To my dear mother". Published by Hainauer.)
Quatre Morceaux	38	Berceuse	G major	Andante		1886	(Note: MoszWV 22 → A composition for piano solo dedicated "To my dear mother". Published by Hainauer.)
Quatre Morceaux	38	Mazurka	G major	Allegro moderato		1886	(Note: MoszWV 22 → A composition for piano solo dedicated "To my dear mother". Published by Hainauer.)
Quatre Morceaux	38	Mélodie italienne	A major	Allegro con spirito		1886	(Note: MoszWV 22 → A composition for piano solo dedicated "To my dear mother". Published by Hainauer.)
Première Suite d'Orchestre	39	No. 1	F major	Allegro molto e brioso		1885	(Note: MoszWV 141 → Composed and dedicated to the Philharmonic Society of London. Published by Hainauer.)
Première Suite d'Orchestre	39	No. 2	F major	Allegro giojoso		1885	(Note: MoszWV 141 → Composed and dedicated to the Philharmonic Society of London. Published by Hainauer.)
Première Suite d'Orchestre	39	No. 3 Tema con variazioni	A major	Andante		1885	(Note: MoszWV 141 → Composed and dedicated to the Philharmonic Society of London. Published by Hainauer.)
Première Suite d'Orchestre	39	No. 4 Intermezzo	A major	Allegretto con moto		1885	(Note: MoszWV 141 → Composed and dedicated to the Philharmonic Society of London. Published by Hainauer.)
Première Suite d'Orchestre	39	No. 5 Perpetuum mobile	F major	Vivace		1885	(Note: MoszWV 141 → Composed and dedicated to the Philharmonic Society of London. Published by Hainauer.)
Première Suite d'Orchestre	39a	Idem	Idem	Idem		1885	(Note: MoszWV 141a → Version for piano four hands. Published by Hainauer.)
Première Suite d'Orchestre	39b	Intermezzo	Idem	Idem		1885	(Note: MoszWV 141b → Version for piano (after Op. 39, No. 4). Published by Hainauer.)
Scherzo-Valse	40	—	G♭ major	Allegro		1886	(Note: MoszWV 23 → A Scherzo-Valse for piano two hands. Dedicated to Madame Annette Essipoff-Leschetitzky. Published by Peters.)
Gondoliera	41	—	G minor	Andante con moto		1886	(Note: MoszWV 24 → A composition for piano two hands most probably with ideas borrowed very slightly in feeling and form from Mendelssohn's Venetian Gondola songs. Dedicated to Monsieur Joseph Pollack. Published by Peters.)
Trois Morceaux Poétiques	42	Romance	D minor	Allegretto		1887	(Note: MoszWV 25 → A composition for piano two hands. Published by Bote & Bock.)
Trois Morceaux Poétiques	42	Siciliano	F♯ minor	Con malinconia		1887	(Note: MoszWV 25 → A composition for piano two hands. Published by Bote & Bock.)
Trois Morceaux Poétiques	42	Momento giojoso	E♭ major	Molto vivace		1887	(Note: MoszWV 25 → A composition for piano two hands. Published by Bote & Bock.)
Deux Morceaux	43	Cortège	A minor	Allegro ma non troppo		1887	(Note: MoszWV 107 → A composition for piano four hands dedicated to Messier Frédéric de Schennis. Published by Peters.)
Deux Morceaux	43	Gavotte	—	Moderato		1887	(Note: MoszWV 107 → A composition for piano four hands dedicated to Messier Frédéric de Schennis. Published by Peters.)
Deux Morceaux	43a	Cortège	Idem	Idem		1888	(Note: MoszWV 107a → A composition for orchestra subtitled as Fantastischer Zug. Published by C. F. Peters.)
Der Schäfer putzte sich zum Tanz	44	—	D major	Allegretto		1887	(Note: MoszWV 200 → A composition for soli, chorus and small orchestra whose title is translated as The shepherd dressed for the dance from a scene in Goethe's Faust. Published by Hainauer.)
Der Schäfer putzte sich zum Tanz	44a	—	Idem	Idem		1887	(Note: MoszWV 200a → A composition for piano solo arranged by the composer. Published by Hainauer.)
Zwei Klavierstücke	45	Polonaise	D♭ major	Moderato		1888	(Note: MoszWV 26 → A composition for piano solo. No. 1 dedicated to Monsieur Felix Dreyschock, and No. 2 to Herrn Sally Liebling. Published by Peters.)
Zwei Klavierstücke	45	Guitarre	G major	Allegro comodo		1888	(Note: MoszWV 26 → A composition for piano solo. No. 1 dedicated to Monsieur Felix Dreyschock, and No. 2 to Herrn Sally Liebling. Published by Peters.)
Zwei Klavierstücke	45a	Guitarre	Idem	Idem		1888	(Note: MoszWV 26a → Chamber music for cello and piano. Published by Peters.)
Zwei Klavierstücke	45b	Guitarre	Idem	Idem		1888	(Note: MoszWV 26b → Chamber music for violin and piano (arranged by Pablo de Sarasate). Published by Peters. Often mentioned as Op 45, No. 2)
Valse et Mazurka	46	Valse	F major	—		1890	(Note: MoszWV 27 → A composition for piano solo. Published by Hainauer.)
Valse et Mazurka	46	Mazurka	G major	—		1890	(Note: MoszWV 27 → A composition for piano solo. Published by Hainauer.)
Deuxième Suite d'Orchestre	47	Preludio	G minor	Lento		1890	(Note: MoszWV 142 → An orchestral composition (written for piccolo, flutes, oboes, clarinets, bassoons, contrabassoon, horns, trompe, timpani, triangle, bass drum and cymbals, trombones and tuba, harp, violin I, violin II, viola, cello, double bass, and organ) dedicated to composer Hans von Bülow. Published by Hainauer.)
Deuxième Suite d'Orchestre	47	Fuga	—	Un pochino più animato		1890	(Note: MoszWV 142 → An orchestral composition (written for piccolo, flutes, oboes, clarinets, bassoons, contrabassoon, horns, trompe, timpani, triangle, bass drum and cymbals, trombones and tuba, harp, violin I, violin II, viola, cello, double bass, and organ) dedicated to composer Hans von Bülow. Published by Hainauer.)
Deuxième Suite d'Orchestre	47	Scherzo	—	Molto vivace		1890	(Note: MoszWV 142 → An orchestral composition (written for piccolo, flutes, oboes, clarinets, bassoons, contrabassoon, horns, trompe, timpani, triangle, bass drum and cymbals, trombones and tuba, harp, violin I, violin II, viola, cello, double bass, and organ) dedicated to composer Hans von Bülow. Published by Hainauer.)
Deuxième Suite d'Orchestre	47	Larghetto	—	Larghetto		1890	(Note: MoszWV 142 → An orchestral composition (written for piccolo, flutes, oboes, clarinets, bassoons, contrabassoon, horns, trompe, timpani, triangle, bass drum and cymbals, trombones and tuba, harp, violin I, violin II, viola, cello, double bass, and organ) dedicated to composer Hans von Bülow. Published by Hainauer.)
Deuxième Suite d'Orchestre	47	Intermezzo	D major	Allegretto con moto		1890	(Note: MoszWV 142 → An orchestral composition (written for piccolo, flutes, oboes, clarinets, bassoons, contrabassoon, horns, trompe, timpani, triangle, bass drum and cymbals, trombones and tuba, harp, violin I, violin II, viola, cello, double bass, and organ) dedicated to composer Hans von Bülow. Published by Hainauer.)
Deuxième Suite d'Orchestre	47	Marcia	G major	Allegro con brio		1890	(Note: MoszWV 142 → An orchestral composition (written for piccolo, flutes, oboes, clarinets, bassoons, contrabassoon, horns, trompe, timpani, triangle, bass drum and cymbals, trombones and tuba, harp, violin I, violin II, viola, cello, double bass, and organ) dedicated to composer Hans von Bülow. Published by Hainauer.)
Deuxième Suite d'Orchestre	47a	Preludio et Intermezzo	Idem	Idem		1890	(Note: MoszWV 142a → A composition for piano solo (after Op. 47, No. 1 & No. 5). Published by Hainauer.)
Deux Études de Concert	48	—	D major	Presto		1890	(Note: MoszWV 28 → An étude for piano which Moszkowski began writing between June and July 1889 (?). A year later, he wrote to his publisher Max Abraham saying: "I will send you at the same time my newly completed Op. 48 for piano (2 Concert Etudes). Although the manuscript is well written and is very accurate, I would like to ask you to send the last proof. The price for this piece is 1500 Mk. I hope you hereby agree. [...] The title is: Deux Etudes de Concert pour le Piano composée par Maurice Moszkowski - Oeuvre 48". Étude No. 1 was dedicated to Monsieur Max Pauer, and No. 2 to Paul de Schlözer. It was then published by Peters.)
Deux Études de Concert	48	—	C major	Allegro brillante		1890	
Boabdil, der letzte Maurenkönig	49	—	—	—		1888–92	(Note: MoszWV 201 → Opera in three acts with libretto by Carl Wittkowsky. Published by Peters.)
Balletmusik aus der Oper Boabdil	49a	Malagueña	—	Allegro pomposo		1892	(Note: MoszWV 201a → A composition for piano solo. There may be an arrangement (MoszWV 49d) for parts Maurischer Marsch [und Einzugsmarsch] for piano four hands. Published by Peters.)
Balletmusik aus der Oper Boabdil	49a	Scherzo-Valse	E minor	—		1892	(Note: MoszWV 201a → A composition for piano solo. There may be an arrangement (MoszWV 49d) for parts Maurischer Marsch [und Einzugsmarsch] for piano four hands. Published by Peters.)
Balletmusik aus der Oper Boabdil	49a	Maurische Fantasia	A major	—		1892	(Note: MoszWV 201a → A composition for piano solo. There may be an arrangement (MoszWV 49d) for parts Maurischer Marsch [und Einzugsmarsch] for piano four hands. Published by Peters.)
Maurischer Marsch aus der Oper Boadbil	49b	—	B♭ major	Allegro moderato		1892	(Note: MoszWV 201b → Arranged for piano solo. Published by Peters.)
Einzugsmarsch aus der Oper Boabdil	49c	—	D major	Allegro		1893	(Note: MoszWV 201c → Arranged for piano solo. Published by Peters.)
Suite	50	First movement	G major	Allegro moderato		1892	(Note: MoszWV 29 → A composition for piano solo, first published by Peters.)
Suite	50	Second movement. Air	G major	Andante malinconico		1892	(Note: MoszWV 29 → A composition for piano solo, first published by Peters.)
Suite	50	Third movement. Capriccio	G major	Molto vivace		1892	(Note: MoszWV 29 → A composition for piano solo, first published by Peters.)
Suite	50	Presto alla Giga	G major	Con bravura		1892	(Note: MoszWV 29 → A composition for piano solo, first published by Peters.)
Fackeltanz	51	—	E♭ major	Allegro molto moderato		1893	(Note: MoszWV 202 → Translated as Danse aux Flambeaux (Torchlight Dance), it is an orchestral composition (Stage music) dedicated to the Corps de Ballet of the Royal Opera in Berlin, to which it was commissioned without being discussed with the directorship of the theatre where it was first performed. The Berlin premiere of the play, which was staged in samples together with the ballet music from Boabdil, caused Moszkowski much concern. It premiered in the US on 2 February 1894, in Chicago, with Theodore Thomas as conductor of the Chicago Symphony Orchestra. Published by Peters.)
Fackeltanz	51a	—	Idem	Idem		1893	(Note: MoszWV 202a → Arranged for piano published by Peters.)
Sechs Fantasiestücke	52	Landschaftsbildchen	D major	Allegro moderato		1894	(Note: MoszWV 30 → A composition for piano solo whose titles in French are: No. 1 Landscape image, No. 2 Night Piece, No. 3 Duet, No. 4 The juggler, No. 5 Carnivalesque intrigue, and No. 6 At the party. Dedicated to Frau Carrie B. Johnson, it was published by Peters.)
Sechs Fantasiestücke	52	Nachtstück	A major	Agitato		1894	(Note: MoszWV 30 → A composition for piano solo whose titles in French are: No. 1 Landscape image, No. 2 Night Piece, No. 3 Duet, No. 4 The juggler, No. 5 Carnivalesque intrigue, and No. 6 At the party. Dedicated to Frau Carrie B. Johnson, it was published by Peters.)
Sechs Fantasiestücke	52	Zwiegesang	B♭ major	Andante espressivo		1894	(Note: MoszWV 30 → A composition for piano solo whose titles in French are: No. 1 Landscape image, No. 2 Night Piece, No. 3 Duet, No. 4 The juggler, No. 5 Carnivalesque intrigue, and No. 6 At the party. Dedicated to Frau Carrie B. Johnson, it was published by Peters.)
Sechs Fantasiestücke	52	Die Jongleurin	E♭ major	Allegro con spirito		1894	(Note: MoszWV 30 → A composition for piano solo whose titles in French are: No. 1 Landscape image, No. 2 Night Piece, No. 3 Duet, No. 4 The juggler, No. 5 Carnivalesque intrigue, and No. 6 At the party. Dedicated to Frau Carrie B. Johnson, it was published by Peters.)
Sechs Fantasiestücke	52	Maskenscherz und Demaskirung	C minor	Allegro appassionato		1894	(Note: MoszWV 30 → A composition for piano solo whose titles in French are: No. 1 Landscape image, No. 2 Night Piece, No. 3 Duet, No. 4 The juggler, No. 5 Carnivalesque intrigue, and No. 6 At the party. Dedicated to Frau Carrie B. Johnson, it was published by Peters.)
Sechs Fantasiestücke	52	Beim Feste	C major	Allegro molto		1894	(Note: MoszWV 30 → A composition for piano solo whose titles in French are: No. 1 Landscape image, No. 2 Night Piece, No. 3 Duet, No. 4 The juggler, No. 5 Carnivalesque intrigue, and No. 6 At the party. Dedicated to Frau Carrie B. Johnson, it was published by Peters.)
Laurin. Ballet in Six Tableaux	53	—	—	—		1892–95	(Note: MoszWV 203 → Ballet music for orchestra over the poem Laurin about Theodoric the Great, with libretto by Emil Taubert and choreography by Emil Graeb. It premiered on 28 February 1896 at the Opera House of the Royal Shows in Berlin under the baton of music director Steinmann. Dedicated to Fräulein Régine Nicol. Published by Bote & Bock.)
Vier Stücke aus dem Ballett Laurin	53a	Tanz der Rosenelfen	E major	Allegretto grazioso		1895	(Note: MoszWV 203a → Arranged for piano solo (there may be a piano reduction of this composition - MoszWV 203b) whose titles translate: No. 1 Dance of the Rose Elves, No. 2 March of the Dwarfs, No. 3 Sarabande (F major) und Double (D minor), are divided in two pieces, and No. 4. Valse Coquette. Published by Bote & Bock.)
Vier Stücke aus dem Ballett Laurin	53a	Marsch der Zwerge	E♭ major	Allegro moderato		1895	(Note: MoszWV 203a → Arranged for piano solo (there may be a piano reduction of this composition - MoszWV 203b) whose titles translate: No. 1 Dance of the Rose Elves, No. 2 March of the Dwarfs, No. 3 Sarabande (F major) und Double (D minor), are divided in two pieces, and No. 4. Valse Coquette. Published by Bote & Bock.)
Vier Stücke aus dem Ballett Laurin	53a	Sarabande und Double	F major	Andante		1895	(Note: MoszWV 203a → Arranged for piano solo (there may be a piano reduction of this composition - MoszWV 203b) whose titles translate: No. 1 Dance of the Rose Elves, No. 2 March of the Dwarfs, No. 3 Sarabande (F major) und Double (D minor), are divided in two pieces, and No. 4. Valse Coquette. Published by Bote & Bock.)
Vier Stücke aus dem Ballett Laurin	53a	Sarabande und Double	D minor	Un poco animato		1895	(Note: MoszWV 203a → Arranged for piano solo (there may be a piano reduction of this composition - MoszWV 203b) whose titles translate: No. 1 Dance of the Rose Elves, No. 2 March of the Dwarfs, No. 3 Sarabande (F major) und Double (D minor), are divided in two pieces, and No. 4. Valse Coquette. Published by Bote & Bock.)
Vier Stücke aus dem Ballett Laurin	53a	Valse Coquette	G major	Allegro scherzando		1895	(Note: MoszWV 203a → Arranged for piano solo (there may be a piano reduction of this composition - MoszWV 203b) whose titles translate: No. 1 Dance of the Rose Elves, No. 2 March of the Dwarfs, No. 3 Sarabande (F major) und Double (D minor), are divided in two pieces, and No. 4. Valse Coquette. Published by Bote & Bock.)
Drei Stücke	54	Danse fantastique	G major	Allegretto con moto		1895	(Note: MoszWV 31 → A composition for piano solo dedicated to Frau Fannie Bloomfield Zeisler. Published by Peters.)
Drei Stücke	54	Mélodie	E minor	Andante con moto		1895	(Note: MoszWV 31 → A composition for piano solo dedicated to Frau Fannie Bloomfield Zeisler. Published by Peters.)
Drei Stücke	54	Capriccietto	E major	Allegro giojoso		1895	(Note: MoszWV 31 → A composition for piano solo dedicated to Frau Fannie Bloomfield Zeisler. Published by Peters.)
Polnische Volkstänze	55	Mazurka	E major	Allegro		1896	(Note: MoszWV 108 → A composition for piano four hands dedicated to Frau Aniela Fürstenberg. Published by Peters.)
Polnische Volkstänze	55	Mazurka	G major	Allegro un poco moderato		1896	(Note: MoszWV 108 → A composition for piano four hands dedicated to Frau Aniela Fürstenberg. Published by Peters.)
Polnische Volkstänze	55	Polonaise	B minor	Allegretto con moto		1896	(Note: MoszWV 108 → A composition for piano four hands dedicated to Frau Aniela Fürstenberg. Published by Peters.)
Polnische Volkstänze	55	Krakowiak	G major	Allegro con spirito		1896	(Note: MoszWV 108 → A composition for piano four hands dedicated to Frau Aniela Fürstenberg. Published by Peters.)
Polnische Volkstänze	55a	Mazurka	Idem	Idem		1898	(Note: MoszWV 108a → Arranged for orchestra (after Op. 55, No. 1 & No. 4) between May–June 1898. Published by Peters.)
Polnische Volkstänze	55a	Krakowiak	Idem	Idem		1898	(Note: MoszWV 108a → Arranged for orchestra (after Op. 55, No. 1 & No. 4) between May–June 1898. Published by Peters.)
Polnische Volkstänze	55b	Idem	Idem	Idem		1896	(Note: MoszWV 108b → Arranged for piano solo by Moszkowski in October 1896. Published by Peters the following year.)
Don Juan und Faust	56	Overture	—	Allegro appassionato		1896	(Note: MoszWV 204 → Overture and incidental music. Published by Ries & Erler.)
Don Juan und Faust	56	Entr'acte	G major	Andante		1896	(Note: MoszWV 204 → Overture and incidental music. Published by Ries & Erler.)
Don Juan und Faust	56	Sarabande	D major	Grave		1896	(Note: MoszWV 204 → Overture and incidental music. Published by Ries & Erler.)
Don Juan und Faust	56	Passepied	A major	Allegro molto		1896	(Note: MoszWV 204 → Overture and incidental music. Published by Ries & Erler.)
Don Juan und Faust	56	Intermezzo	A♭ major	Moderato		1896	(Note: MoszWV 204 → Overture and incidental music. Published by Ries & Erler.)
Don Juan und Faust	56	Fantasmagorie	E major	Andante quasi allegretto		1896	(Note: MoszWV 204 → Overture and incidental music. Published by Ries & Erler.)
Don Juan und Faust	56	Minuetto	B♭ major	Allegro		1896	(Note: MoszWV 204 → Overture and incidental music. Published by Ries & Erler.)
Six Airs de Ballet	56a	Idem	Idem	Idem		1897	(Note: MoszWV 204a → Arranged for two pianos four hands (after Op. 56, No. 2, No. 3, No. 5, No. 6). Published by Ries & Erler.)
Six Airs de Ballet	56b	Idem	Idem	Idem		1897	(Note: MoszWV 204b → Arranged for piano four hands. Published by Ries & Erler.)
Six Airs de Ballet	56c	Sarabande	Idem	Idem		1897	(Note: MoszWV 204c → Chamber music for violon and piano (after Op. 56, No. 3 & No. 4). Published by Enoch.)
Six Airs de Ballet	56c	Passepied	Idem	Idem		1897	(Note: MoszWV 204c → Chamber music for violon and piano (after Op. 56, No. 3 & No. 4). Published by Enoch.)
Frühling. Fünf Stücke	57	Ungeduld	E♭ major	Allegro affettuoso		1896	(Note: MoszWV 32 → A composition for piano solo with titles translated as: Spring. Five Pieces No. 1 Impatience, No. 2 Spring chime, No. 3 Flower piece, No. 4 Zephyr (the God of the West Wind or the west wind personified), No. 5 Love waltz. First published by Peters.)
Frühling. Fünf Stücke	57	Frühlingsläuten	B♭ major	Allegretto con moto		1896	(Note: MoszWV 32 → A composition for piano solo with titles translated as: Spring. Five Pieces No. 1 Impatience, No. 2 Spring chime, No. 3 Flower piece, No. 4 Zephyr (the God of the West Wind or the west wind personified), No. 5 Love waltz. First published by Peters.)
Frühling. Fünf Stücke	57	Blumenstück	F major	Moderato		1896	(Note: MoszWV 32 → A composition for piano solo with titles translated as: Spring. Five Pieces No. 1 Impatience, No. 2 Spring chime, No. 3 Flower piece, No. 4 Zephyr (the God of the West Wind or the west wind personified), No. 5 Love waltz. First published by Peters.)
Frühling. Fünf Stücke	57	Zephyr	D♭ major	Allegretto animato		1896	(Note: MoszWV 32 → A composition for piano solo with titles translated as: Spring. Five Pieces No. 1 Impatience, No. 2 Spring chime, No. 3 Flower piece, No. 4 Zephyr (the God of the West Wind or the west wind personified), No. 5 Love waltz. First published by Peters.)
Frühling. Fünf Stücke	57	Liebeswalzer	A♭ major	Tempo giusto		1896	(Note: MoszWV 32 → A composition for piano solo with titles translated as: Spring. Five Pieces No. 1 Impatience, No. 2 Spring chime, No. 3 Flower piece, No. 4 Zephyr (the God of the West Wind or the west wind personified), No. 5 Love waltz. First published by Peters.)
Tristesses et Sourires	58	Effusion	E major	Con moto agitato		1896	(Note: MoszWV 33 → A composition for piano solo whose title comes from an 1883 novel by Antoine Gustave Droz. Published by Hainauer.)
Tristesses et Sourires	58	Consolation	A♭ major	Allegro moderato		1896	(Note: MoszWV 33 → A composition for piano solo whose title comes from an 1883 novel by Antoine Gustave Droz. Published by Hainauer.)
Tristesses et Sourires	58	Près du berceau	A♭ major	Allegretto grazioso		1896	(Note: MoszWV 33 → A composition for piano solo whose title comes from an 1883 novel by Antoine Gustave Droz. Published by Hainauer.)
Tristesses et Sourires	58	Vieux souvenir	C♯ minor	Allegro comodo		1896	(Note: MoszWV 33 → A composition for piano solo whose title comes from an 1883 novel by Antoine Gustave Droz. Published by Hainauer.)
Tristesses et Sourires	58	Historiette d'enfants	D major	Vivace		1896	(Note: MoszWV 33 → A composition for piano solo whose title comes from an 1883 novel by Antoine Gustave Droz. Published by Hainauer.)
Tristesses et Sourires	58	Mélancolie	A minor	Andante semplice		1896	(Note: MoszWV 33 → A composition for piano solo whose title comes from an 1883 novel by Antoine Gustave Droz. Published by Hainauer.)
Tristesses et Sourires	58	Rêve étrange	G major	Allegro con spirito		1896	(Note: MoszWV 33 → A composition for piano solo whose title comes from an 1883 novel by Antoine Gustave Droz. Published by Hainauer.)
Tristesses et Sourires	58	Résignation	B minor	Andante con moto		1896	(Note: MoszWV 33 → A composition for piano solo whose title comes from an 1883 novel by Antoine Gustave Droz. Published by Hainauer.)
Tristesses et Sourires	58a	Près du berceau	Idem	Idem		1896	(Note: MoszWV 33a → Chamber music for violin and piano. Published by Enoch.)
Tristesses et Sourires	58b	Près du berceau	Idem	Idem		1896	(Note: MoszWV 33b → An arrangement for orchestra. Published by Enoch.)
Piano Concerto No. 2	59	First movement	E major	Moderato		1897	(Note: MoszWV 162 → This piano concerto was first performed in Britain on 12 May 1898. Dedicated "à Monsieur Josef Casimir Hofmann", it was scored for brass, woodwind and strings, making also use of a harp and triangle. Composer and musical critic Hubbard William Harris provided the following musical analysis: "The first movement is a brilliant composition, opening with what may he taken as its principal theme, inasmuch as it furnishes most of the material for the development, and also reappears in the last movement as a climax to the whole work. The announcement of this resolute subject, by the flutes and oboes accompanied lightly by other woodwind, and deeper strings, is followed by a short solo cadenza, after which the unfolding of the musical picture begins. As this proceeds several subsidiary melodies come to notice, prominent among them being one which (while hinted at before) does not assume its formal shape until given out, grazioso, by the pianoforte alone following a short upward chromatic scale passage. This graceful subject also figures, conspicuously in the development, which after passing through a succession of interesting stages, culminates finally in a rousing climax. The second movement is an eloquent, nocturne-like effusion, of which the principal thematic element is the expressive subject given out softly at the commencement by the clarinet, and bassoons, staccato, and the strings, pizzicato - this being taken up shortly and carried on by the solo instrument. An agreeably contrasting intermediary section follows, after which the expressive first theme returns - now in the harp and strings against flowing figurations in the solo instrument. Lastly a short free conclusion passage leads us into the third movement. The vivace is a lively, sparkling composition in Moszkowski's characteristically brilliant manner, and commences with the statement of a nimble running theme by the solo instrument. After this vivacious subject and its derivatives have been worked over briefly another buoyant theme comes to notice in the flutes and clarinets, over a strumming guitar-like accompaniment in the pianoforte. The development from here runs mainly on this theme, leading finally to a short cantabile passage for the solo instrument (unaccompanied), following which the movement proceeds quickly to a dashing conclusion. The fourth and last movement opens with a short flourishing introductory passage which leads to the statement of a resolute theme by the solo instrument. After this has been developed at considerable length the pianoforte introduces a contrasting theme of flowing character, to which the clarinet attaches itself shortly. Presently the development of the resolute opening theme is resumed, leading to the entrance of still another subject, given out softy but decidedly by the clarinet and the violas, and worked up forthwith in alternation and combination with the resolute opening theme. The flowing second theme returns, the movement mounting thence to a climax, at the pinnacle of which the resolute opening theme of the first movement reappears in enlarged rhythm." Published by Peters.)
Piano Concerto No. 2	59	Second movement	C♯ minor	Andante		1897	
Piano Concerto No. 2	59	Third movement	C♯ minor	Scherzo vivace		1897	
Piano Concerto No. 2	59	Fourth movement	E major	Allegro deciso		1897	
Piano Concerto No. 2	59a	Idem	Idem	Idem		1897	(Note: Piano duet → Arrangement for two pianos four hand. Published by Peters.)
Trois Mazurkas	60	Mazurka	G minor	Allegro moderato		1898	(Note: MoszWV 34 → Three Mazurkas. A composition for piano. Published by Ries & Erler)
Trois Mazurkas	60	Mazurka	F major	Allegretto graziotto		1898	(Note: MoszWV 34 → Three Mazurkas. A composition for piano. Published by Ries & Erler)
Trois Mazurkas	60	Mazurka	D major	Con fuoco		1898	(Note: MoszWV 34 → Three Mazurkas. A composition for piano. Published by Ries & Erler)
Trois Mazurkas	60a	Idem	F major	Idem		1898	(Note: MoszWV 34a → A composition for 2 pianos (after Op. 60, No. 2). Published by Ries & Erler.)
Trois Mazurkas	60b	Idem	D major	Idem		1898	(Note: MoszWV 34b → A composition for 2 pianos (after Op. 60, No. 3). Published by Ries & Erler.)
Trois Arabesques	61	No. 1	A♭ major	Allegretto anomato		1899	(Note: MoszWV 35 → A composition for piano solo, first published by Peters.)
Trois Arabesques	61	No. 2	D♭ major	Allegro piacevoe		1899	(Note: MoszWV 35 → A composition for piano solo, first published by Peters.)
Trois Arabesques	61	No. 3	G major	Allegro		1899	(Note: MoszWV 35 → A composition for piano solo, first published by Peters.)
Romance et Scherzo	62	Romance	A major	Andante espressivo		1899	(Note: MoszWV 36 → A composition for piano solo, first published by Peters.)
Romance et Scherzo	62	Scherzo	G minor	Presto con leggierezza		1899	(Note: MoszWV 36 → A composition for piano solo, first published by Peters.)
Trois Bagatelles	63	No. 1	D major	Allegro comodo		1899	(Note: MoszWV 37 → A composition for piano solo, first published by Peters.)
Trois Bagatelles	63	No. 2	C minor	Allegro non troppo		1899	(Note: MoszWV 37 → A composition for piano solo, first published by Peters.)
Trois Bagatelles	63	No. 3	F major	Allegretto scherzando		1899	(Note: MoszWV 37 → A composition for piano solo, first published by Peters.)
École des Doubles-Notes	64	Les gammes en tierces Les gammes en sixtes Les gammes majeures en quartes Gammes chromatiques	— — — —	— — — —		1900	(Note: MoszWV 38a → A collection of exercises for piano divided in 3 Books dedicated to Louis Diémer [1843–1919], pianist, composer and professor at the Conservatoire de Paris. Together with MoszWV 38b, Le Livre des Gammes (1904), divided in two parts: Les Gammes en notes simples (Die Tonleitern in einfachen Noten) and Les Gammes en double notes [Extraites de l‘Ecole des Doubles-Notes], it forms a work partly consistent with Opus 64 (MoszWV 38a) in 4 parts. The so-called part 5, "Observations sur le doigté" (Observations on the fingering of scales in single and double notes), is not part of this set of studies, but just commentaries on the technique used in the exercises. First published by Enoch.)
École des Doubles-Notes	64	Collection d'exercices en doubles notes	—	—		1900	
École des Doubles-Notes	64	Quatre grandes études	A♭ major B♭ major B♭ major E♭ major	Allgro molto Allegro; Vivace; Appassionato		1900	
Neue Spanische Tänze	65	No. 1	E♭ major	Allegro ma non troppo		1900	(Note: MoszWV 109 → A composition for piano four hands. No. 3 is entitled Habanera. Dedicated to Monsieur Théodore Jelowicki, it was published by Peters.)
Neue Spanische Tänze	65	No. 2	A minor	Andante con moto		1900	(Note: MoszWV 109 → A composition for piano four hands. No. 3 is entitled Habanera. Dedicated to Monsieur Théodore Jelowicki, it was published by Peters.)
Neue Spanische Tänze	65	Habanera	F major	Allegretto		1900	(Note: MoszWV 109 → A composition for piano four hands. No. 3 is entitled Habanera. Dedicated to Monsieur Théodore Jelowicki, it was published by Peters.)
Neue Spanische Tänze	65a	Habanera	Idem	Idem		1901	(Note: MoszWV 109a → Arranged for piano solo. Published by Peters.)
Neue Spanische Tänze	65b	Habanera	Idem	Idem		1904	(Note: MoszWV 109b → Arranged for orchestra without solo instrument. Published by Peters.)
Neue Spanische Tänze	65c	Spanischer Tanz	Idem	Idem		1911	(Note: MoszWV 109c → Arranged for orchestra (after Op. 65, No. 2). Published by Peters.)
Trois Pensées Fugitives	66	No. 1	F♯ minor	Agitato		1900	(Note: MoszWV 39 → A composition for piano solo dedicated to Mlle. Maud Johnson. It was published by Edition Peters.)
Trois Pensées Fugitives	66	No. 2	E major	Allegretto con moto		1900	(Note: MoszWV 39 → A composition for piano solo dedicated to Mlle. Maud Johnson. It was published by Edition Peters.)
Trois Pensées Fugitives	66	No. 3	F major	Vivo		1900	(Note: MoszWV 39 → A composition for piano solo dedicated to Mlle. Maud Johnson. It was published by Edition Peters.)
Deux Morceaux	67	Poème de mai	B♭ major	Con moto		1901	(Note: MoszWV 40 → A composition for piano solo. Dedicated to Mlle. Celeste Nellis, it was published by Ries & Erler.)
Deux Morceaux	67	Étude	G minor	Vivace		1901	(Note: MoszWV 40 → A composition for piano solo. Dedicated to Mlle. Celeste Nellis, it was published by Ries & Erler.)
Deux Morceaux	67a	Idem	Idem	Idem		1906	(Note: MoszWV 40a → A composition for two pianos 4 hands. Published by Ries & Erler.)
Deux Morceaux	67b	Idem	Idem	Idem		1904	(Note: MoszWV 40b → A composition for two pianos 4 hands. Published by Ries & Erler.)
Quatre Morceaux	68	Nocturne	F minor	Andante con moto		1902	(Note: MoszWV 41 → A composition for piano solo dedicated to Romanian concert pianist Mademoiselle Constance Erbiceanu (1874-1961). She studied in Leipzig and was a pupil of Karl Reinecke (1894-1898). Published by Enoch.)
Quatre Morceaux	68	Minuetto	F major	Allegro moderato		1902	(Note: MoszWV 41 → A composition for piano solo dedicated to Romanian concert pianist Mademoiselle Constance Erbiceanu (1874-1961). She studied in Leipzig and was a pupil of Karl Reinecke (1894-1898). Published by Enoch.)
Quatre Morceaux	68	Au crépuscule	A major	Lento		1902	(Note: MoszWV 41 → A composition for piano solo dedicated to Romanian concert pianist Mademoiselle Constance Erbiceanu (1874-1961). She studied in Leipzig and was a pupil of Karl Reinecke (1894-1898). Published by Enoch.)
Quatre Morceaux	68	Danse russe	B minor	Allegro con spirito		1902	(Note: MoszWV 41 → A composition for piano solo dedicated to Romanian concert pianist Mademoiselle Constance Erbiceanu (1874-1961). She studied in Leipzig and was a pupil of Karl Reinecke (1894-1898). Published by Enoch.)
Valse de Concert	69	—	F major	Allegro		1902	(Note: MoszWV 42 → A composition for piano dedicated to Mr. Charles Förster. It was first published by Julius Hainauer.)
Deux Morceaux	70	Caprice-Étude	D minor	Veloce		1902	(Note: MoszWV 43 → A composition for piano solo first published by Enoch.)
Deux Morceaux	70	Improvisation	G major	Andante con moto		1902	(Note: MoszWV 43 → A composition for piano solo first published by Enoch.)
Suite für Zwei Violinen und Klavier	71	No. 1	G minor	Allegro energico		1903	(Note: MoszWV 135 → Chamber music for 2 violins and piano (apparently commissioned) written and dedicated to Mlle. Isabelle Levallois. First published by Peters.)
Suite für Zwei Violinen und Klavier	71	No. 2	G major	Allegro moderato		1903	(Note: MoszWV 135 → Chamber music for 2 violins and piano (apparently commissioned) written and dedicated to Mlle. Isabelle Levallois. First published by Peters.)
Suite für Zwei Violinen und Klavier	71	No. 3	E minor	Lento assai		1903	(Note: MoszWV 135 → Chamber music for 2 violins and piano (apparently commissioned) written and dedicated to Mlle. Isabelle Levallois. First published by Peters.)
Suite für Zwei Violinen und Klavier	71	No. 4	G major	Molto vivace		1903	(Note: MoszWV 135 → Chamber music for 2 violins and piano (apparently commissioned) written and dedicated to Mlle. Isabelle Levallois. First published by Peters.)
Quinze Études de Virtuosité	72	No. 1	E major	Vivace		1903	(Note: MoszWV 44 → An étude for piano solo whose subtitle is Per aspera ad astra. In a letter that Moszkowski wrote to his publisher Henri Hinrichsen on 13 February 1902 in Paris, he mentioned that these etudes would be an average about four printed pages in length and should be a kind of modern school of velocity, as they were a continuation of the difficult études of Czerny, who had among his students Theodor Kullak, founder of the Neue Akademie der Tonkunst. Dedicated to Monsieur Alexandre Michalowski, it was published by Enoch.)
Quinze Études de Virtuosité	72	No. 2	G minor	Allegro brillante		1903	
Quinze Études de Virtuosité	72	No. 3	G major	Vivo e con fuoco		1903	
Quinze Études de Virtuosité	72	No. 4	C major	Allegro moderato		1903	
Quinze Études de Virtuosité	72	No. 5	C major	Veloce e leggiero		1903	
Quinze Études de Virtuosité	72	No. 6	F major	Presto		1903	
Quinze Études de Virtuosité	72	No. 7	E♭ major	Allegro energico		1903	
Quinze Études de Virtuosité	72	No. 8	C major	Allegro energico		1903	
Quinze Études de Virtuosité	72	No. 9	D minor	Allegro		1903	
Quinze Études de Virtuosité	72	No. 10	C major	Allegro		1903	
Quinze Études de Virtuosité	72	No. 11	A♭ major	Presto e con leggierezza		1903	
Quinze Études de Virtuosité	72	No. 12	D♭ major	Presto		1903	
Quinze Études de Virtuosité	72	No. 13	A♭ minor	Molto animato		1903	
Quinze Études de Virtuosité	72	No. 14	C minor	Moderato		1903	
Quinze Études de Virtuosité	72	No. 15	B major	Allegro		1903	
Trois Morceaux	73	Esquisse vénitienne	A minor	Allegreto		1904	(Note: MoszWV 45 → Morceau No. 1 dedicated to Mademoiselle Annie Crosby, No. 2 to Mademoiselle Eugénie Wehrmann, and No. 3 to Madame Marie Nemès. Published by Hainauer.)
Trois Morceaux	73	Impromptu	A♭ major	Allegro con spirito		1904	(Note: MoszWV 45 → Morceau No. 1 dedicated to Mademoiselle Annie Crosby, No. 2 to Mademoiselle Eugénie Wehrmann, and No. 3 to Madame Marie Nemès. Published by Hainauer.)
Trois Morceaux	73	Course folle	G♭ major	Allegro molto		1904	(Note: MoszWV 45 → Morceau No. 1 dedicated to Mademoiselle Annie Crosby, No. 2 to Mademoiselle Eugénie Wehrmann, and No. 3 to Madame Marie Nemès. Published by Hainauer.)
Kaleidoskop	74	—	E♭ major	Molto allegro con fuoco		1904	(Note: MoszWV 110 → A composition for piano four hands with subtitle Miniaturbilder, dedicated to Fräulein Louise Péraux-La Roche. It was first published by Peters.)
Kaleidoskop	74	—	G minor	Presto		1904	(Note: MoszWV 110 → A composition for piano four hands with subtitle Miniaturbilder, dedicated to Fräulein Louise Péraux-La Roche. It was first published by Peters.)
Kaleidoskop	74	—	D major	Andante		1904	(Note: MoszWV 110 → A composition for piano four hands with subtitle Miniaturbilder, dedicated to Fräulein Louise Péraux-La Roche. It was first published by Peters.)
Kaleidoskop	74	—	F♯ minor	Allegro moderato e grazioso		1904	(Note: MoszWV 110 → A composition for piano four hands with subtitle Miniaturbilder, dedicated to Fräulein Louise Péraux-La Roche. It was first published by Peters.)
Kaleidoskop	74	—	B major	Allegro con spirito		1904	(Note: MoszWV 110 → A composition for piano four hands with subtitle Miniaturbilder, dedicated to Fräulein Louise Péraux-La Roche. It was first published by Peters.)
Kaleidoskop	74	—	E minor	Mesto		1904	(Note: MoszWV 110 → A composition for piano four hands with subtitle Miniaturbilder, dedicated to Fräulein Louise Péraux-La Roche. It was first published by Peters.)
Kaleidoskop	74	—	A major	Tempo di valse		1904	(Note: MoszWV 110 → A composition for piano four hands with subtitle Miniaturbilder, dedicated to Fräulein Louise Péraux-La Roche. It was first published by Peters.)
Deux Morceaux	75	Caprice	A major	Allegro con leggiereza		1906	(Note: MoszWV 46 → A morceau for piano dedicated to Mademoiselle Hélène Collin. No. 2 is an étude. Published by Junne.)
Deux Morceaux	75	L'agilità	G minor	Molto allegro		1906	(Note: MoszWV 46 → A morceau for piano dedicated to Mademoiselle Hélène Collin. No. 2 is an étude. Published by Junne.)
Trois Morceaux	76	Souvenir du Pausilippe	A minor	Allegretto con moto		1906	(Note: MoszWV 47 → A morceau for piano dedicated to Mademoiselle Nellie Kauffmann-Kendall. Published by Forberg.)
Trois Morceaux	76	Valse-Caprice	A major	Molto vivace		1906	(Note: MoszWV 47 → A morceau for piano dedicated to Mademoiselle Nellie Kauffmann-Kendall. Published by Forberg.)
Trois Morceaux	76	Fabliau	G major	Allegro moderato		1906	(Note: MoszWV 47 → A morceau for piano dedicated to Mademoiselle Nellie Kauffmann-Kendall. Published by Forberg.)
Dix Pièces Mignonnes	77	Tristesse	A minor	Andante		1907	(Note: MoszWV 48 → A composition for piano solo dedicated to Mademoiselle Gabrielle Turpin. Published by Schott.)
Dix Pièces Mignonnes	77	Scherzino	C major	Allegro vivace		1907	(Note: MoszWV 48 → A composition for piano solo dedicated to Mademoiselle Gabrielle Turpin. Published by Schott.)
Dix Pièces Mignonnes	77	Romance sans paroles	E major	Andante espressivo		1907	(Note: MoszWV 48 → A composition for piano solo dedicated to Mademoiselle Gabrielle Turpin. Published by Schott.)
Dix Pièces Mignonnes	77	Inquiétude	A minor	Allegro molto		1907	(Note: MoszWV 48 → A composition for piano solo dedicated to Mademoiselle Gabrielle Turpin. Published by Schott.)
Dix Pièces Mignonnes	77	Intimité	F major	Allegro comodo		1907	(Note: MoszWV 48 → A composition for piano solo dedicated to Mademoiselle Gabrielle Turpin. Published by Schott.)
Dix Pièces Mignonnes	77	Tarentelle	D minor	Presto		1907	(Note: MoszWV 48 → A composition for piano solo dedicated to Mademoiselle Gabrielle Turpin. Published by Schott.)
Dix Pièces Mignonnes	77	Impromptu	E♭ major	Allegro moderato		1907	(Note: MoszWV 48 → A composition for piano solo dedicated to Mademoiselle Gabrielle Turpin. Published by Schott.)
Dix Pièces Mignonnes	77	Pantomime	E minor	Allegro con spirito		1907	(Note: MoszWV 48 → A composition for piano solo dedicated to Mademoiselle Gabrielle Turpin. Published by Schott.)
Dix Pièces Mignonnes	77	Mélodie	D major	Allegretto		1907	(Note: MoszWV 48 → A composition for piano solo dedicated to Mademoiselle Gabrielle Turpin. Published by Schott.)
Dix Pièces Mignonnes	77	Menuet	G major	Molto moderato		1907	(Note: MoszWV 48 → A composition for piano solo dedicated to Mademoiselle Gabrielle Turpin. Published by Schott.)
Drei Etüden	78	No. 1	F major	Vivace		1907 (?)	(Note: MoszWV 49 → An étude for piano. Published by Schott.)
Drei Etüden	78	No. 2	A♭ major	Allegro grazioso		1907 (?)	(Note: MoszWV 49 → An étude for piano. Published by Schott.)
Drei Etüden	78	No. 3	A♭ major	Moderato e cantabile		1907 (?)	(Note: MoszWV 49 → An étude for piano. Published by Schott.)
Troisième Suite d'Orchestre	79	No. 1	A♭ major	Allegro		1908	(Note: MoszWV 143 → A composition orchestra. Moszkowski wrote to his publisher, Henri Hinrichsen, on 25 August 1907 in Paris: "I have currently finished my Opus 79, a four-movement orchestral suite which I have to perform in the first half of September. The premiere in Lausanne is to make any remaining correction. The score is currently with the copyist and once it is finished, I believe it will have about 165 pages (in press maybe 150.) The first two movements are quite symphonic, the third is a waltz that will probably be playing a lot separately, and may also become a piano piece. The second movement is likely to be suitable for a single output. That is, I hope that it may be convenient for you, and if this is the case, I suggest you a fee of 3,000 Marks for it. I do not think you'll find that amount too high, especially if you consider that I will have to pay about 450 Francs for the copy of the score and 200 Francs for a sample. I intend to travel to Lausanne on September 1, therefore I would be grateful if you would let me go." This composition was dedicated to Polish composer and conductor Monsieur Alex Z. Birnbaum, and published the following year by Bote & Bock.)
Troisième Suite d'Orchestre	79	No. 2	F major	Molto moderato (La note obstinée)		1908	
Troisième Suite d'Orchestre	79	No. 3	D♭ major	Tempo di valse, non troppo allegro		1908	
Troisième Suite d'Orchestre	79	No. 4	A♭ major	Allegro deciso		1908	
Valse pour Piano	79a	No. 3	Idem	Idem		1908	(Note: MoszWV 143a → A composition for piano solo (after Op. 79, No. 3). Published by Bote & Bock.)
Deux Morceaux	80	Pièce romantique	A♭ major	Allegretto moderato		1908	(Note: MoszWV 50 → Two morceaux for piano, being No. 1. dedicated to Madame Dora Bright, and No. 2. to Madame Berthe Riché. Published by Bote & Bock.)
Deux Morceaux	80	Mit Fächer und Mantilla (Con Mantilla y Abanico)	F major	Allegro leggiero		1908	(Note: MoszWV 50 → Two morceaux for piano, being No. 1. dedicated to Madame Dora Bright, and No. 2. to Madame Berthe Riché. Published by Bote & Bock.)
Six Morceaux	81	Canon	A♭ major	Allegro grazioso		1909	(Note: MoszWV 51 → A morceau for piano solo. No. 1 was dedicated to Monsieur J. Joachim Nin, No. 2. to Madame Marie Panthès-Kutner, No. 3. to Madame Eugénie Schaffner, No. 4. to Monsieur Josef Lhévinne, No. 5. to Monsieur Ossip Gabrilowitsch, and No. 6. to Monsieur Léopold Godowski. Published by Schott.)
Six Morceaux	81	Allegro agitato	F minor	Allegro agitato		1909	(Note: MoszWV 51 → A morceau for piano solo. No. 1 was dedicated to Monsieur J. Joachim Nin, No. 2. to Madame Marie Panthès-Kutner, No. 3. to Madame Eugénie Schaffner, No. 4. to Monsieur Josef Lhévinne, No. 5. to Monsieur Ossip Gabrilowitsch, and No. 6. to Monsieur Léopold Godowski. Published by Schott.)
Six Morceaux	81	Étude de legato	D♭ major	Moderato		1909	(Note: MoszWV 51 → A morceau for piano solo. No. 1 was dedicated to Monsieur J. Joachim Nin, No. 2. to Madame Marie Panthès-Kutner, No. 3. to Madame Eugénie Schaffner, No. 4. to Monsieur Josef Lhévinne, No. 5. to Monsieur Ossip Gabrilowitsch, and No. 6. to Monsieur Léopold Godowski. Published by Schott.)
Six Morceaux	81	Humoresque	D minor	Allegro scherzando		1909	(Note: MoszWV 51 → A morceau for piano solo. No. 1 was dedicated to Monsieur J. Joachim Nin, No. 2. to Madame Marie Panthès-Kutner, No. 3. to Madame Eugénie Schaffner, No. 4. to Monsieur Josef Lhévinne, No. 5. to Monsieur Ossip Gabrilowitsch, and No. 6. to Monsieur Léopold Godowski. Published by Schott.)
Six Morceaux	81	Romance	F minor	Moderato e dolente		1909	(Note: MoszWV 51 → A morceau for piano solo. No. 1 was dedicated to Monsieur J. Joachim Nin, No. 2. to Madame Marie Panthès-Kutner, No. 3. to Madame Eugénie Schaffner, No. 4. to Monsieur Josef Lhévinne, No. 5. to Monsieur Ossip Gabrilowitsch, and No. 6. to Monsieur Léopold Godowski. Published by Schott.)
Six Morceaux	81	Melodia appassionata	E minor	Allegro leggiero		1909	(Note: MoszWV 51 → A morceau for piano solo. No. 1 was dedicated to Monsieur J. Joachim Nin, No. 2. to Madame Marie Panthès-Kutner, No. 3. to Madame Eugénie Schaffner, No. 4. to Monsieur Josef Lhévinne, No. 5. to Monsieur Ossip Gabrilowitsch, and No. 6. to Monsieur Léopold Godowski. Published by Schott.)
Quatre Morceaux	82	Les nymphes	A minor	Allegro leggiero		1909	(Note: MoszWV → Chamber music for violin and piano. Dedicateers are: 1. Monsieur Pierre Sechiari, 2. Monsieur Alberto Abraham Bachmann, 3. Monsieur Israel Mendels, 4. Monsieur George Enescu. Published by Peters.)
Quatre Morceaux	82	Caprice	A minor	Allegretto		1909	(Note: MoszWV → Chamber music for violin and piano. Dedicateers are: 1. Monsieur Pierre Sechiari, 2. Monsieur Alberto Abraham Bachmann, 3. Monsieur Israel Mendels, 4. Monsieur George Enescu. Published by Peters.)
Quatre Morceaux	82	Mélodie	G major	Moderato		1909	(Note: MoszWV → Chamber music for violin and piano. Dedicateers are: 1. Monsieur Pierre Sechiari, 2. Monsieur Alberto Abraham Bachmann, 3. Monsieur Israel Mendels, 4. Monsieur George Enescu. Published by Peters.)
Quatre Morceaux	82	Humoresque	D major	Allegro con spirito		1909	(Note: MoszWV → Chamber music for violin and piano. Dedicateers are: 1. Monsieur Pierre Sechiari, 2. Monsieur Alberto Abraham Bachmann, 3. Monsieur Israel Mendels, 4. Monsieur George Enescu. Published by Peters.)
Six Morceaux	83	Élégie	F minor	Molto moderato ed espressivo		1909	(Note: MoszWV 52 → A morceau for piano solo. No. 1, 2 and 3 was dedicated to Monsieur Paul Braud Cahier II, who taught at the Conservatory of Marseille, and No. 4, 5, and 6 to Madame Hélène Wittkowsky. Published by Hainauer.)
Six Morceaux	83	Sur l'eau	F major	Allegretto animato		1909	(Note: MoszWV 52 → A morceau for piano solo. No. 1, 2 and 3 was dedicated to Monsieur Paul Braud Cahier II, who taught at the Conservatory of Marseille, and No. 4, 5, and 6 to Madame Hélène Wittkowsky. Published by Hainauer.)
Six Morceaux	83	Vieux pastel	G♭ major	Comodo		1909	(Note: MoszWV 52 → A morceau for piano solo. No. 1, 2 and 3 was dedicated to Monsieur Paul Braud Cahier II, who taught at the Conservatory of Marseille, and No. 4, 5, and 6 to Madame Hélène Wittkowsky. Published by Hainauer.)
Six Morceaux	83	Canon	B♭ major	Andante cantabile		1909	(Note: MoszWV 52 → A morceau for piano solo. No. 1, 2 and 3 was dedicated to Monsieur Paul Braud Cahier II, who taught at the Conservatory of Marseille, and No. 4, 5, and 6 to Madame Hélène Wittkowsky. Published by Hainauer.)
Six Morceaux	83	Chanson populaire	G major	Allegretto semplice		1909	(Note: MoszWV 52 → A morceau for piano solo. No. 1, 2 and 3 was dedicated to Monsieur Paul Braud Cahier II, who taught at the Conservatory of Marseille, and No. 4, 5, and 6 to Madame Hélène Wittkowsky. Published by Hainauer.)
Six Morceaux	83	Chanson napolitaine	G major	Vivacissimo		1909	(Note: MoszWV 52 → A morceau for piano solo. No. 1, 2 and 3 was dedicated to Monsieur Paul Braud Cahier II, who taught at the Conservatory of Marseille, and No. 4, 5, and 6 to Madame Hélène Wittkowsky. Published by Hainauer.)
Quatre Moments Musicaux	84	No. 1	B♭ major	Con moto		1910	(Note: MoszWV 53 → Four morceaux for piano solo written at Villa Murg in Marlotte (Seine-et-Marne), France. Published by Schott.)
Quatre Moments Musicaux	84	No. 2	F major	Moderato e grazioso		1910	(Note: MoszWV 53 → Four morceaux for piano solo written at Villa Murg in Marlotte (Seine-et-Marne), France. Published by Schott.)
Quatre Moments Musicaux	84	No. 3	C minor	Maestoso		1910	(Note: MoszWV 53 → Four morceaux for piano solo written at Villa Murg in Marlotte (Seine-et-Marne), France. Published by Schott.)
Quatre Moments Musicaux	84	No. 4	G major	Animato ma non troppo		1910	(Note: MoszWV 53 → Four morceaux for piano solo written at Villa Murg in Marlotte (Seine-et-Marne), France. Published by Schott.)
Präludium und Fuge	85	Präludium	D minor	Moderato		1910	(Note: MoszWV 144 → Moszkowski wrote Prelude and Fugue for string quartet, which he describes as "serious", shortly after the death of his mother Salomia on 13 April 1910. Moszkowski demanded six hundred francs for the work, but Henri Hinrichsen, his publisher from C. F. Peters, had given him more and published the work in September 1911. Shortly before that, on 17 December of that year, his Opus 85 premiered in his presence at the Covent Garden Theatre, in London, under the direction of his former pupil Thomas Beecham. By the initiative of well-known French musician colleagues such as Saint-Saëns, Massenet, Widor, Fauré, Dubois, Debussy, Dièmer, Guilmant, Paladilhe, Wormser, Moszkowski received in the fall of 1910 the rank of Chevalier of the French Légion d'Honneur. Dedicated to the Polish composer Zygmunt Stojowski.)
Präludium und Fuge	85	Fuge	F major	Allegro energico		1910	
Trois Morceaux	86	Feuillet d'album	E♭ major	Animato e con leggierezza		1911	(Note: MoszWV 54 → Three morceaux for piano solo. There was a print error when Feuillet d'album was published by Schott as plate number 29085 on Opus 85 and 86, and Gavotte as plate number 29086. Scherzo-etude was apparently published only as Op. 85. No. 1 was dedicated to Mlle. Hélène Augustin, No. 2 to Mr. William H. Sherwood, and No. 3 to Mlle. Catherine Linn.)
Trois Morceaux	86	Gavotte	G minor	Allegro deciso		1911	(Note: MoszWV 54 → Three morceaux for piano solo. There was a print error when Feuillet d'album was published by Schott as plate number 29085 on Opus 85 and 86, and Gavotte as plate number 29086. Scherzo-etude was apparently published only as Op. 85. No. 1 was dedicated to Mlle. Hélène Augustin, No. 2 to Mr. William H. Sherwood, and No. 3 to Mlle. Catherine Linn.)
Trois Morceaux	86	Scherzo-Étude	E minor	Presto		1911	(Note: MoszWV 54 → Three morceaux for piano solo. There was a print error when Feuillet d'album was published by Schott as plate number 29085 on Opus 85 and 86, and Gavotte as plate number 29086. Scherzo-etude was apparently published only as Op. 85. No. 1 was dedicated to Mlle. Hélène Augustin, No. 2 to Mr. William H. Sherwood, and No. 3 to Mlle. Catherine Linn.)
Trois Morceaux	87	Complainte	C♯ minor	Andante		1911	(Note: MoszWV 55 → Three morceaux for piano solo. No. 1 was dedicated to Mademoiselle Yvonne Galliet, No. 2 to Monsieur Carl Stasny and No. 3 to Monsieur Sam Fleishman. It was first published by Enoch.)
Trois Morceaux	87	Offrande	D major	Animato ma non tropo		1911	(Note: MoszWV 55 → Three morceaux for piano solo. No. 1 was dedicated to Mademoiselle Yvonne Galliet, No. 2 to Monsieur Carl Stasny and No. 3 to Monsieur Sam Fleishman. It was first published by Enoch.)
Trois Morceaux	87	Impromptu	F major	Allegro grazioso		1911	(Note: MoszWV 55 → Three morceaux for piano solo. No. 1 was dedicated to Mademoiselle Yvonne Galliet, No. 2 to Monsieur Carl Stasny and No. 3 to Monsieur Sam Fleishman. It was first published by Enoch.)
Grande Valse de Concert	88	—	G♭ major	Moderato		1912	(Note: MoszWV 56 → A composition for piano solo dedicated to his friend Monsieur Isidore Philipp. Published by Theodore Presser, and later by Enoch.)
Tanz-momente	89	Valse-prélude	B♭ major	Allegro con fuoco		1912	(Note: MoszWV 57 → A composition for piano. No. 3 changes from B♭ minor to B♭ major as well. Published by Hainauer.)
Tanz-momente	89	Valse mignonne	G♭ major	Animato e grazioso		1912	(Note: MoszWV 57 → A composition for piano. No. 3 changes from B♭ minor to B♭ major as well. Published by Hainauer.)
Tanz-momente	89	Valse triste	B♭ major	Moderato ed espressivo		1912	(Note: MoszWV 57 → A composition for piano. No. 3 changes from B♭ minor to B♭ major as well. Published by Hainauer.)
Tanz-momente	89	Valse tendre	F major	Tempo commodo		1912	(Note: MoszWV 57 → A composition for piano. No. 3 changes from B♭ minor to B♭ major as well. Published by Hainauer.)
Tanz-momente	89	Valse-Tourbillon	A major	Vivace		1912	(Note: MoszWV 57 → A composition for piano. No. 3 changes from B♭ minor to B♭ major as well. Published by Hainauer.)
Introduction et Allegro pour l‘Orgue Aeolien	90	—	—	—		1913?	(Note: MoszWV 128 → A composition for aeolian organ. Unpublished work.)
Vingt Petites Études	91	No. 1	G major	Con moto		1913	(Note: MoszWV 58 → An étude for piano solo dedicated to Madame M. T. Amirian who was Moszkowski' student and late life partner. Published by Leduc.)
Vingt Petites Études	91	No. 2	C major	Vivace		1913	(Note: MoszWV 58 → An étude for piano solo dedicated to Madame M. T. Amirian who was Moszkowski' student and late life partner. Published by Leduc.)
Vingt Petites Études	91	No. 3	C major	Vivace		1913	(Note: MoszWV 58 → An étude for piano solo dedicated to Madame M. T. Amirian who was Moszkowski' student and late life partner. Published by Leduc.)
Vingt Petites Études	91	No. 4	F major	Allegro		1913	(Note: MoszWV 58 → An étude for piano solo dedicated to Madame M. T. Amirian who was Moszkowski' student and late life partner. Published by Leduc.)
Vingt Petites Études	91	No. 5	B♭ major	Tempo animato		1913	(Note: MoszWV 58 → An étude for piano solo dedicated to Madame M. T. Amirian who was Moszkowski' student and late life partner. Published by Leduc.)
Vingt Petites Études	91	No. 6	E♭ major	Allegro ma troppo		1913	(Note: MoszWV 58 → An étude for piano solo dedicated to Madame M. T. Amirian who was Moszkowski' student and late life partner. Published by Leduc.)
Vingt Petites Études	91	No. 7	G major	Allegro brillante		1913	(Note: MoszWV 58 → An étude for piano solo dedicated to Madame M. T. Amirian who was Moszkowski' student and late life partner. Published by Leduc.)
Vingt Petites Études	91	No. 8	B minor	Moderato		1913	(Note: MoszWV 58 → An étude for piano solo dedicated to Madame M. T. Amirian who was Moszkowski' student and late life partner. Published by Leduc.)
Vingt Petites Études	91	No. 9	G major	Comodo		1913	(Note: MoszWV 58 → An étude for piano solo dedicated to Madame M. T. Amirian who was Moszkowski' student and late life partner. Published by Leduc.)
Vingt Petites Études	91	No. 10	G minor	Andante con moto		1913	(Note: MoszWV 58 → An étude for piano solo dedicated to Madame M. T. Amirian who was Moszkowski' student and late life partner. Published by Leduc.)
Vingt Petites Études	91	No. 11	C major	Allegro ma non troppo		1913	(Note: MoszWV 58 → An étude for piano solo dedicated to Madame M. T. Amirian who was Moszkowski' student and late life partner. Published by Leduc.)
Vingt Petites Études	91	No. 12	C major	Veloce		1913	(Note: MoszWV 58 → An étude for piano solo dedicated to Madame M. T. Amirian who was Moszkowski' student and late life partner. Published by Leduc.)
Vingt Petites Études	91	No. 13	F minor	Con moto ma non troppo		1913	(Note: MoszWV 58 → An étude for piano solo dedicated to Madame M. T. Amirian who was Moszkowski' student and late life partner. Published by Leduc.)
Vingt Petites Études	91	No. 14	C major	Animato e leggiero		1913	(Note: MoszWV 58 → An étude for piano solo dedicated to Madame M. T. Amirian who was Moszkowski' student and late life partner. Published by Leduc.)
Vingt Petites Études	91	No. 15	E♭ major	Allegro non troppo, ma molto energico		1913	(Note: MoszWV 58 → An étude for piano solo dedicated to Madame M. T. Amirian who was Moszkowski' student and late life partner. Published by Leduc.)
Vingt Petites Études	91	No. 16	G minor	Allegro energico		1913	(Note: MoszWV 58 → An étude for piano solo dedicated to Madame M. T. Amirian who was Moszkowski' student and late life partner. Published by Leduc.)
Vingt Petites Études	91	No. 17	E♭ major	Moderato e cantabile		1913	(Note: MoszWV 58 → An étude for piano solo dedicated to Madame M. T. Amirian who was Moszkowski' student and late life partner. Published by Leduc.)
Vingt Petites Études	91	No. 18	A minor	Vivo		1913	(Note: MoszWV 58 → An étude for piano solo dedicated to Madame M. T. Amirian who was Moszkowski' student and late life partner. Published by Leduc.)
Vingt Petites Études	91	No. 19	E major	Presto		1913	(Note: MoszWV 58 → An étude for piano solo dedicated to Madame M. T. Amirian who was Moszkowski' student and late life partner. Published by Leduc.)
Vingt Petites Études	91	No. 20	G♭ major	Allegro moderato		1913	(Note: MoszWV 58 → An étude for piano solo dedicated to Madame M. T. Amirian who was Moszkowski' student and late life partner. Published by Leduc.)
12 Études de Piano pour la Main Gauche Seule	92	No. 1	C major	Allegro energico		1915	(Note: MoszWV 117 → A composition for piano solo left hand dedicated to Monsieur Harold Bauer. Published by Enoch.)
12 Études de Piano pour la Main Gauche Seule	92	No. 2	A minor	Allegro ma un poco moderato		1915	(Note: MoszWV 117 → A composition for piano solo left hand dedicated to Monsieur Harold Bauer. Published by Enoch.)
12 Études de Piano pour la Main Gauche Seule	92	No. 3	A minor	Allegro ma non troppo		1915	(Note: MoszWV 117 → A composition for piano solo left hand dedicated to Monsieur Harold Bauer. Published by Enoch.)
12 Études de Piano pour la Main Gauche Seule	92	No. 4	E minor	Allegro moderato		1915	(Note: MoszWV 117 → A composition for piano solo left hand dedicated to Monsieur Harold Bauer. Published by Enoch.)
12 Études de Piano pour la Main Gauche Seule	92	No. 5	G major	Andante espressivo		1915	(Note: MoszWV 117 → A composition for piano solo left hand dedicated to Monsieur Harold Bauer. Published by Enoch.)
12 Études de Piano pour la Main Gauche Seule	92	No. 6	G minor	Presto		1915	(Note: MoszWV 117 → A composition for piano solo left hand dedicated to Monsieur Harold Bauer. Published by Enoch.)
12 Études de Piano pour la Main Gauche Seule	92	No. 7	G major	Allegretto scherzando		1915	(Note: MoszWV 117 → A composition for piano solo left hand dedicated to Monsieur Harold Bauer. Published by Enoch.)
12 Études de Piano pour la Main Gauche Seule	92	No. 8	G minor	Veloce		1915	(Note: MoszWV 117 → A composition for piano solo left hand dedicated to Monsieur Harold Bauer. Published by Enoch.)
12 Études de Piano pour la Main Gauche Seule	92	No. 9	E♭ major	Tempo animato		1915	(Note: MoszWV 117 → A composition for piano solo left hand dedicated to Monsieur Harold Bauer. Published by Enoch.)
12 Études de Piano pour la Main Gauche Seule	92	No. 10	A♭ major	Veloce et con leggierezza		1915	(Note: MoszWV 117 → A composition for piano solo left hand dedicated to Monsieur Harold Bauer. Published by Enoch.)
12 Études de Piano pour la Main Gauche Seule	92	No. 11	D♭ major	Moderato e cantabile		1915	(Note: MoszWV 117 → A composition for piano solo left hand dedicated to Monsieur Harold Bauer. Published by Enoch.)
12 Études de Piano pour la Main Gauche Seule	92	No. 12	B♭ minor	Allegro impetuoso		1915	(Note: MoszWV 117 → A composition for piano solo left hand dedicated to Monsieur Harold Bauer. Published by Enoch.)
Six Morceaux	93	Miniature (Memories)	E♭ major	Moderato e grazioso		1916	(Note: MoszWV 59 → Six morceaux for piano solo. No. 1 (as entitled in the Schmidt edition), 2 (as entitled in the Schmidt edition), and 3 were dedicated to Monsieur André Gresse, and No. 4, 5, and 6 to Mme. Riss-Arbeau. Published by Arthur P. Schmidt.)
Six Morceaux	93	Mélodie Élégiaque (Plaintive Thoughts)	F minor	Andante		1916	(Note: MoszWV 59 → Six morceaux for piano solo. No. 1 (as entitled in the Schmidt edition), 2 (as entitled in the Schmidt edition), and 3 were dedicated to Monsieur André Gresse, and No. 4, 5, and 6 to Mme. Riss-Arbeau. Published by Arthur P. Schmidt.)
Six Morceaux	93	Au fil de l'eau (By the Stream)	G major	Con moto moderato		1916	(Note: MoszWV 59 → Six morceaux for piano solo. No. 1 (as entitled in the Schmidt edition), 2 (as entitled in the Schmidt edition), and 3 were dedicated to Monsieur André Gresse, and No. 4, 5, and 6 to Mme. Riss-Arbeau. Published by Arthur P. Schmidt.)
Six Morceaux	93	Étude (Exultation)	A minor	Tempo animato		1916	(Note: MoszWV 59 → Six morceaux for piano solo. No. 1 (as entitled in the Schmidt edition), 2 (as entitled in the Schmidt edition), and 3 were dedicated to Monsieur André Gresse, and No. 4, 5, and 6 to Mme. Riss-Arbeau. Published by Arthur P. Schmidt.)
Six Morceaux	93	Impromptu (Mockery)	B♭ major	Allegretto animato		1916	(Note: MoszWV 59 → Six morceaux for piano solo. No. 1 (as entitled in the Schmidt edition), 2 (as entitled in the Schmidt edition), and 3 were dedicated to Monsieur André Gresse, and No. 4, 5, and 6 to Mme. Riss-Arbeau. Published by Arthur P. Schmidt.)
Six Morceaux	93	Mousse de champagne (Glittering Dewdrops)	D major	Presto		1916	(Note: MoszWV 59 → Six morceaux for piano solo. No. 1 (as entitled in the Schmidt edition), 2 (as entitled in the Schmidt edition), and 3 were dedicated to Monsieur André Gresse, and No. 4, 5, and 6 to Mme. Riss-Arbeau. Published by Arthur P. Schmidt.)
Dix Petits Morceaux	94	Prélude (On Restless Seas)	G minor	Allegro energico		1916 ca.	(Note: MoszWV 60 → Ten morceaux for piano solo. No. 1, 2, 3, 4 and 5 were dedicated to piano teacher Mme. Berte Cahn, who taught at the German Conservatory in New York, and No. 6, 7, 8, 9 and 10 to piano teacher Mme. Hélène Chaumont. No. 8 (Cantilena) is "a short poetic composition usually written for voice or an instrumental passage" (Diccionario enciclopédico de la lengua castellana - 1895). The two sets were published under the name Decameron in the US, with descriptive English titles for each of the pieces. Published by Schott, London.)
Dix Petits Morceaux	94	Calme du soir (Evening in the Vale)	D major	Molto moderato		1916 ca.	
Dix Petits Morceaux	94	Idylle (Waterlilies)	G major	Andante quasi allegretto		1916 ca.	
Dix Petits Morceaux	94	Étude (April weather)	G major	Vivo		1916 ca.	
Dix Petits Morceaux	94	Aux vieux temps (From long ago)	D major	Allegro con spiriro		1916 ca.	
Dix Petits Morceaux	94	Danse de la magicienne (Enchantress)	D minor	Moderato		1916 ca.	
Dix Petits Morceaux	94	Bagatelle (Southern Breezes)	F major	Allegretto anomato		1916 ca.	
Dix Petits Morceaux	94	Cantilena (Dawn in the Forest)	A major	Andante		1916 ca.	
Dix Petits Morceaux	94	Pensée fugitive (Moonbeams)	F♯ minor	Andante con moto		1916 ca.	
Dix Petits Morceaux	94	Rondo joyeuse (Midsummer)	D major	Vivacissimo		1916 ca.	
Cinq Pièces Brèves	95	Mélodie plaintive	C minor	Andante con moto		1920	(Note: MoszWV 61 → Six morceaux for piano solo. Published by Enoch.)
Cinq Pièces Brèves	95	Scherzino	C major	Allegro animato		1920	(Note: MoszWV 61 → Six morceaux for piano solo. Published by Enoch.)
Cinq Pièces Brèves	95	Minuetto	B♭ major	Moderato		1920	(Note: MoszWV 61 → Six morceaux for piano solo. Published by Enoch.)
Cinq Pièces Brèves	95	Arabesque	F major	Allegretto grazioso		1920	(Note: MoszWV 61 → Six morceaux for piano solo. Published by Enoch.)
Cinq Pièces Brèves	95	Câlinerie	B♭ major	Tempo comodo		1920	(Note: MoszWV 61 → Six morceaux for piano solo. Published by Enoch.)
Le maître et l'élève	96	Prologue	C major	Allegro brioso		1920	(Note: MoszWV 111: → Alternative title: Huit Petits Morceaux a Piano Quatre Mains avec des Basses sur cinq notes. A composition for piano four hands dedicated to Mademoiselle Diane de Rothschild. It was first published by Enoch.)
Le maître et l'élève	96	Moment musical	C minor	Molto moderato		1920	(Note: MoszWV 111: → Alternative title: Huit Petits Morceaux a Piano Quatre Mains avec des Basses sur cinq notes. A composition for piano four hands dedicated to Mademoiselle Diane de Rothschild. It was first published by Enoch.)
Le maître et l'élève	96	Mélodie	E♭ major	Allegro moderato		1920	(Note: MoszWV 111: → Alternative title: Huit Petits Morceaux a Piano Quatre Mains avec des Basses sur cinq notes. A composition for piano four hands dedicated to Mademoiselle Diane de Rothschild. It was first published by Enoch.)
Le maître et l'élève	96	Air de ballet	G minor	Andante con moto		1920	(Note: MoszWV 111: → Alternative title: Huit Petits Morceaux a Piano Quatre Mains avec des Basses sur cinq notes. A composition for piano four hands dedicated to Mademoiselle Diane de Rothschild. It was first published by Enoch.)
Le maître et l'élève	96	Arabesque	B♭ major	Allegretto animato		1920	(Note: MoszWV 111: → Alternative title: Huit Petits Morceaux a Piano Quatre Mains avec des Basses sur cinq notes. A composition for piano four hands dedicated to Mademoiselle Diane de Rothschild. It was first published by Enoch.)
Le maître et l'élève	96	Berceuse	D major	Andante		1920	(Note: MoszWV 111: → Alternative title: Huit Petits Morceaux a Piano Quatre Mains avec des Basses sur cinq notes. A composition for piano four hands dedicated to Mademoiselle Diane de Rothschild. It was first published by Enoch.)
Le maître et l'élève	96	Valse	A major	Tempo moderato		1920	(Note: MoszWV 111: → Alternative title: Huit Petits Morceaux a Piano Quatre Mains avec des Basses sur cinq notes. A composition for piano four hands dedicated to Mademoiselle Diane de Rothschild. It was first published by Enoch.)
Le maître et l'élève	96	Tarentelle	C major	Molto vivace		1920	(Note: MoszWV 111: → Alternative title: Huit Petits Morceaux a Piano Quatre Mains avec des Basses sur cinq notes. A composition for piano four hands dedicated to Mademoiselle Diane de Rothschild. It was first published by Enoch.)
Esquisses techniques	97	No. 1	C major	Tempo comodo		1920	(Note: MoszWV 62 → A composition for piano divided in two books dedicated to Mesdemoiselles Marguerite and Henriette Debrie. Published by Leduc.)
Esquisses techniques	97	No. 2	A minor	Molto allegro energico		1920	(Note: MoszWV 62 → A composition for piano divided in two books dedicated to Mesdemoiselles Marguerite and Henriette Debrie. Published by Leduc.)
Esquisses techniques	97	No. 3	C major	Allegro molto		1920	(Note: MoszWV 62 → A composition for piano divided in two books dedicated to Mesdemoiselles Marguerite and Henriette Debrie. Published by Leduc.)
Esquisses techniques	97	No. 4	F minor	Allegro ma non troppo		1920	(Note: MoszWV 62 → A composition for piano divided in two books dedicated to Mesdemoiselles Marguerite and Henriette Debrie. Published by Leduc.)
Esquisses techniques	97	No. 5	C major	Allegrissimo		1920	(Note: MoszWV 62 → A composition for piano divided in two books dedicated to Mesdemoiselles Marguerite and Henriette Debrie. Published by Leduc.)
Esquisses techniques	97	No. 6	A♭ major	Allegro assai		1920	(Note: MoszWV 62 → A composition for piano divided in two books dedicated to Mesdemoiselles Marguerite and Henriette Debrie. Published by Leduc.)
Esquisses techniques	97	No. 7	C major	Puittosto allegro		1920	(Note: MoszWV 62 → A composition for piano divided in two books dedicated to Mesdemoiselles Marguerite and Henriette Debrie. Published by Leduc.)
Esquisses techniques	97	No. 8	C major	Allegro ma non troppo		1920	(Note: MoszWV 62 → A composition for piano divided in two books dedicated to Mesdemoiselles Marguerite and Henriette Debrie. Published by Leduc.)
Esquisses techniques	97	No. 9	C minor	Tempo animato		1920	(Note: MoszWV 62 → A composition for piano divided in two books dedicated to Mesdemoiselles Marguerite and Henriette Debrie. Published by Leduc.)
Esquisses techniques	97	No. 10	G minor	Molto animato e leggero		1920	(Note: MoszWV 62 → A composition for piano divided in two books dedicated to Mesdemoiselles Marguerite and Henriette Debrie. Published by Leduc.)
Esquisses techniques	97	No. 11	B♭ major	Molto vivace		1920	(Note: MoszWV 62 → A composition for piano divided in two books dedicated to Mesdemoiselles Marguerite and Henriette Debrie. Published by Leduc.)
Esquisses techniques	97	No. 12	G minor	Allegretto		1920	(Note: MoszWV 62 → A composition for piano divided in two books dedicated to Mesdemoiselles Marguerite and Henriette Debrie. Published by Leduc.)
Esquisses techniques	97	No. 13	D major	Allegro grazioso		1920	(Note: MoszWV 62 → A composition for piano divided in two books dedicated to Mesdemoiselles Marguerite and Henriette Debrie. Published by Leduc.)
Esquisses techniques	97	No. 14	F♯ minor	Con moto ma non troppo		1920	(Note: MoszWV 62 → A composition for piano divided in two books dedicated to Mesdemoiselles Marguerite and Henriette Debrie. Published by Leduc.)
Esquisses techniques	97	No. 15	D♭ major	Presto		1920	(Note: MoszWV 62 → A composition for piano divided in two books dedicated to Mesdemoiselles Marguerite and Henriette Debrie. Published by Leduc.)
Esquisses techniques	97	No. 16	A major	Vivo		1920	(Note: MoszWV 62 → A composition for piano divided in two books dedicated to Mesdemoiselles Marguerite and Henriette Debrie. Published by Leduc.)

== Works without opus number ==
Title	WV	Name	Key	Tempo	Ge	Year	Note
Mazurka	63	—	G major	—		1873	(Note: MoszWV 63 → A composition for piano solo. This was Moszkowski first published composition. It appeared in the women's magazine Der Bazar der Bazar-Actien-Gesellschaft, a kind of monthly almanac to everyday life. Published by Verlag der Bazar-Actien-Gesellschaft.)
Conservatoristen-Polka	64	—	G major	—		1875	(Note: MoszWV 64 → A composition for piano solo (such as 'Anton Notenquetscher, Op.½'). Published by Ludwig Troll, Cassel.)
Valse brillante	65	—	A♭ major	Allegro con brio		1877	(Note: MoszWV 65 → One of Moszkowski early compositions for piano solo which possibly dates from 1876-77. It was Moszkowski contribution for a 475-page collection of piano selections called the Family Gift-Book, along with those of Vincenz Lachner, Josef Löw, Xaver Scharwenka, and other composers. The book was compiled by Ernst Pauer and published by Augener, in London.)
La Danse	66	—	—	—		1888	(Note: MoszWV 66 → A composition for piano solo (such as 'Anton Notenquetscher, Op.½'). Published by Le Gaulois.)
Pensée fugitive	67	—	E minor	Andante malinconico		1898	(Note: MoszWV 67 → Another contribution of Moszkowski for a 312-page book entitled Das Klavier und seine Meister with many portraits, illustrations and facsimiles of original sheet music by Wilhelm Kienzl, Philipp Scharwenka, Eugene D'Albert, and Richard Strauss. It was compiled by Oskar Bie and published by F. Bruckmann.)
Valse de Concert	68	—	E major	Allegro		1901	(Note: MoszWV 68 → A composition for piano solo dedicated to Monsieur F. Toledo. Published by E. Chatenay.)
Valse-Impromptu	69	—	A♭ major	Allegro moderato		1901	(Note: MoszWV 69 → A composition for piano solo. Published by G. Schirmer.)
Lumières du matin	70	—	A♭ major	Allegro moderato		1906	(Note: MoszWV 70 → A composition for piano solo translated as Morning Lights (The Ladies’ Home Journal). Published by G. Schirmer.)
Valse mignonne	71	—	G♭ major	Moderato		1912	(Note: MoszWV 71 → A composition for piano solo. Published by Hainauer.)
Momento-Scherzo	72	—	—	—		1913	(Note: MoszWV 72 → A composition for piano solo. Published by Senart.)
Étude mélodique	73	—	A♭ major	Molto animato e leggiero		1913	(Note: MoszWV 73 → A composition for piano solo divided into two parts. The first section consists of a melody played in A♭ major and the second section in two different keys, C minor and A♭ major again, with the third section leading to a coda. It was published by Saint Louis: Art Publication Society.)
Mélodie [et Morceau]	120	—	—	—		1906	(Note: MoszWV 120 → A composition for two pianos 4 hands (also appeared in an edition with Poème de Mai, Op 67. Deux Morceaux pour deux pianos à quatre mains par Maurice Moszkowski). Published by Ries & Erler.)
Stücke für Violine und Klavier	133	—	—	—		1865-69	(Note: MoszWV 133 → One of Moszkowski early works together with MoszWV 136. At the time of his life he was taking lessons at the Dresden Conservatory with Prof. Leonhardt (piano), Mr. Risch Biele (harmony), and violin lessons. He left school and was taught by private tutors. Unpublished work.)
Quintett für Klavier und Streichquartett	136	No. 1 Introduction	D minor	Grave		1872 ca.	(Note: MoszWV 136 → Quintet for piano, 2 violins, viola, and violoncello. One of Moszkowski early works together with MoszWV 133. Unpublished work.)
Quintett für Klavier und Streichquartett	136	No. 2 Allegro con brio	F major	Alla breve		1872 ca.	(Note: MoszWV 136 → Quintet for piano, 2 violins, viola, and violoncello. One of Moszkowski early works together with MoszWV 133. Unpublished work.)
Quintett für Klavier und Streichquartett	136	No. 3 Minuetto	F major	Allegro assai		1872 ca.	(Note: MoszWV 136 → Quintet for piano, 2 violins, viola, and violoncello. One of Moszkowski early works together with MoszWV 133. Unpublished work.)
Overture	145	—	D major	—		1871–72	(Note: MoszWV 145 → A composition for large orchestra written in the winter 1871-72. Moszkowski Overture for orchestra had been considered lost, but was found during the research for this catalog of works in Paris. Also, Moszkowski fellow student Jean Louis Nicodé wrote an overture at the Academy. In the original handwritten abbreviations instrumentation: Flauto I, Flauto II, Oboe, Clarinet in A, Bassoon, Cornet in D, Horn in D, Timpani in D and A, Trombone Alto, Trombone Tenore, Trombone Basso, Violin I, Violin II, Viola, Cello, and Basso. Unpublished work.)
Symphony	146	No. 1	D minor	Maestoso, Allegro appassionato, piu mosso		1873	(Note: MoszWV 146 → A composition for orchestra written in the summer of 1873. Moszkowski Overture for Orchestra and Symphony had been considered lost and found during the research for this catalog of works in Paris. Also, Moszkowski fellow student Jean Louis Nicodé wrote a symphony at the Academy. Unpublished work.)
Symphony	146	No. 2 Scherzo	F major	Vivo		1873	(Note: MoszWV 146 → A composition for orchestra written in the summer of 1873. Moszkowski Overture for Orchestra and Symphony had been considered lost and found during the research for this catalog of works in Paris. Also, Moszkowski fellow student Jean Louis Nicodé wrote a symphony at the Academy. Unpublished work.)
Symphony	146	No. 3	B♭ major	Larghetto		1873	(Note: MoszWV 146 → A composition for orchestra written in the summer of 1873. Moszkowski Overture for Orchestra and Symphony had been considered lost and found during the research for this catalog of works in Paris. Also, Moszkowski fellow student Jean Louis Nicodé wrote a symphony at the Academy. Unpublished work.)
Symphony	146	No. 4 Finale	D minor - D major	Presto non tanto, piu mosso		1873	(Note: MoszWV 146 → A composition for orchestra written in the summer of 1873. Moszkowski Overture for Orchestra and Symphony had been considered lost and found during the research for this catalog of works in Paris. Also, Moszkowski fellow student Jean Louis Nicodé wrote a symphony at the Academy. Unpublished work.)
Zwei Lieder	174	Lied der Pixies	—	—		1907	(Note: MoszWV 174 → A composition for female voice and piano. No. 1 translated as Song of the Pixies (adapted from words of Samuel Taylor Coleridge) and No. 2 The Rainbow (adapted from words of Mrs. Heman). Published by Augener.)
Zwei Lieder	174	Der Regenbogen	—	—		1907	(Note: MoszWV 174 → A composition for female voice and piano. No. 1 translated as Song of the Pixies (adapted from words of Samuel Taylor Coleridge) and No. 2 The Rainbow (adapted from words of Mrs. Heman). Published by Augener.)
Mein Engel, Du! (La Jota)	175	—	D minor	Allegretto		1884	(Note: MoszWV 175 → A composition (La jota) for soprano and piano. Published by Saint Louis: Kunkel Bros.)
Anton Notenquetscher	205	Theme (Im Grunewald ist Holzauktion)	E minor	—		1896	(Note: MoszWV 205 → Anton Notenquetscher at the piano. Variations in the style of modern composers, from Czerny to Liszt. Published by Steinitz. A composition written on the occasion of a ceremony to Carl Bechstein's seventieth birthday on June 1, 1896.)
Anton Notenquetscher	205	Var. 1 Czerny	—	Con velocita		1896	(Note: MoszWV 205 → Anton Notenquetscher at the piano. Variations in the style of modern composers, from Czerny to Liszt. Published by Steinitz. A composition written on the occasion of a ceremony to Carl Bechstein's seventieth birthday on June 1, 1896.)
Anton Notenquetscher	205	Var. 2 Clementi	—	Allegro moderato		1896	(Note: MoszWV 205 → Anton Notenquetscher at the piano. Variations in the style of modern composers, from Czerny to Liszt. Published by Steinitz. A composition written on the occasion of a ceremony to Carl Bechstein's seventieth birthday on June 1, 1896.)
Anton Notenquetscher	205	Var. 3 Bach	—	Moderato		1896	(Note: MoszWV 205 → Anton Notenquetscher at the piano. Variations in the style of modern composers, from Czerny to Liszt. Published by Steinitz. A composition written on the occasion of a ceremony to Carl Bechstein's seventieth birthday on June 1, 1896.)
Anton Notenquetscher	205	Var. 4 Brahms	—	Allegretto tranquillo		1896	(Note: MoszWV 205 → Anton Notenquetscher at the piano. Variations in the style of modern composers, from Czerny to Liszt. Published by Steinitz. A composition written on the occasion of a ceremony to Carl Bechstein's seventieth birthday on June 1, 1896.)
Anton Notenquetscher	205	Var. 5 Weber	—	Allegro ma non troppo		1896	(Note: MoszWV 205 → Anton Notenquetscher at the piano. Variations in the style of modern composers, from Czerny to Liszt. Published by Steinitz. A composition written on the occasion of a ceremony to Carl Bechstein's seventieth birthday on June 1, 1896.)
Anton Notenquetscher	205	Var. 6 Chopin	—	Maestoso		1896	(Note: MoszWV 205 → Anton Notenquetscher at the piano. Variations in the style of modern composers, from Czerny to Liszt. Published by Steinitz. A composition written on the occasion of a ceremony to Carl Bechstein's seventieth birthday on June 1, 1896.)
Anton Notenquetscher	205	Var. 7 Rubinstein	—	Con bravura		1896	(Note: MoszWV 205 → Anton Notenquetscher at the piano. Variations in the style of modern composers, from Czerny to Liszt. Published by Steinitz. A composition written on the occasion of a ceremony to Carl Bechstein's seventieth birthday on June 1, 1896.)
Anton Notenquetscher	205	Var. 8 Liszt	—	Allegretto		1896	(Note: MoszWV 205 → Anton Notenquetscher at the piano. Variations in the style of modern composers, from Czerny to Liszt. Published by Steinitz. A composition written on the occasion of a ceremony to Carl Bechstein's seventieth birthday on June 1, 1896.)
Sechs Menuette für Orchester	210	No. 2 (Menuett)	G major	—		1918	(Note: MoszWV 210 → Transcription for piano of Beethoven's Sechs Menuette für Orchester (the original version is lost, only an arrangement for piano is extant) in G major, WoO 10, No. 2.)
Violinsonate	211	No. 2	C minor	Adagio cantabile		1919	(Note: MoszWV 211 → Transcription for piano of Beethoven's Adagio cantabile aus der Violinsonate in C minor, Opus 30, No. 2.)
Klavierkonzert No. 5	212		E♭ major	Adagio un poco moto		1921	(Note: MoszWV 212 → Transcription for piano of Beethoven's Piano Concerto No. 5 (Emperor) in E♭ major, Opus 73. This fragment of Beethoven's Emperor Concerto was transcribed by Moszkowski in 1921.)
Don Giovanni	213	Menuett	G major	Moderato		1919	(Note: MoszWV 213 → Transcription for piano of Mozart's Menuett aus der Oper Don Giovanni, K. 527 (the final part of Act I).)
Klavierkonzert No. 20	214	2nd movement (Romanze)	D minor	Romance		1919	(Note: MoszWV 214 → Transcription for piano of Mozart's Romanze aus dem Klavierkonzert No. 20, KV 466.)
Rinaldo	215	Lascia ch’io pianga	F major	Largo		1919	(Note: MoszWV 215 → Transcription for piano of Händel's Aria Lascia ch'io pianga aus Rinaldo.)
Judas Maccabäus	216	Chor: Seht den Sieger ruhmgekrönt!	G major	—		1919	(Note: MoszWV 216 → Transcription for piano of Händel's Act III Chor (See the Conquering Hero Comes), aus dem oratorio Judas Maccabäus, HWV 63.)
Ein Sommernachtstraum	217	Nocturno	C♯ minor	Con moto tranquillo		1919	(Note: MoszWV 217 → Transcription for piano of Mendelssohn's Nocturne aus Ein Sommernachtstraum, (Midsummer Night’s Dream) Opus 61.)
Chor aus Judas Maccabäus	230	Chor	—	—		—	(Note: MoszWV 230 → Transcription for piano four hands of Handel's Chor aus Judas Maccabäus, HWV 63.)
Minuett aus Don Giovanni	231	Menuett	G major	—		—	(Note: MoszWV 231 → Transcription for piano four hands of Mozart's Menuett from the opera Don Giovanni, KV 527.)
Carmen	250	Chanson bohème	E minor	Allegretto		1906	(Note: MoszWV 250 → Transcription for four hands of Georges Bizet's Chanson bohème from the Opera Carmen. Dedicated to Monsieur Moriz Rosenthal. Published by Hainauer.)
Hoffmann's Erzählungen	251	Barcarole	B minor	Moderato		1910	(Note: MoszWV 251 → Transcription of Jacques Offenbach's The Tales of Hoffmann for piano. Dedicated to Mademoiselle Elizabeth Strauss. Published by Peters.)
Isoldens Tod	252	—	—	Lento e languido		1910 ca.	(Note: MoszWV 252 → Paraphrase for piano of Richard Wagner's Tristan und Isolde's final scene. Dedicated to Ferruccio Busoni. Published by Peters.)
Der Venusberg	253	Venusberg-Bacchanale	E major	Allegro		1910–11	(Note: MoszWV 253 → Paraphrase for piano of Richard Wagner's scene Venusberg-Bacchanale from Tannhäuser. Dedicated to Mark Hambourg. Published by Peters.)
Ungarische Tänze	260	No. 1	G minor	Allegro		1904	(Note: MoszWV 260 → Transcription for piano solo of Brahms' Ungarische Tänze, WoO 1. Published by Augener Limited.)
Ungarische Tänze	260	No. 2	D minor	Allegro non asai - Vivo		1904	(Note: MoszWV 260 → Transcription for piano solo of Brahms' Ungarische Tänze, WoO 1. Published by Augener Limited.)
Ungarische Tänze	260	No. 3	F major	Allegretto		1904	(Note: MoszWV 260 → Transcription for piano solo of Brahms' Ungarische Tänze, WoO 1. Published by Augener Limited.)
Ungarische Tänze	260	No. 4	F minor	Poco sostenuto - Vivace		1904	(Note: MoszWV 260 → Transcription for piano solo of Brahms' Ungarische Tänze, WoO 1. Published by Augener Limited.)
Ungarische Tänze	260	No. 5	F♯ minor	Allegro - Viivace		1904	(Note: MoszWV 260 → Transcription for piano solo of Brahms' Ungarische Tänze, WoO 1. Published by Augener Limited.)
Ungarische Tänze	260	No. 6	D♭ major	Vivace - Molto sostenuto		1904	(Note: MoszWV 260 → Transcription for piano solo of Brahms' Ungarische Tänze, WoO 1. Published by Augener Limited.)
Ungarische Tänze	260	No. 7	A major	Allegretto		1904	(Note: MoszWV 260 → Transcription for piano solo of Brahms' Ungarische Tänze, WoO 1. Published by Augener Limited.)
Ungarische Tänze	260	No. 8	A minor	Presto		1904	(Note: MoszWV 260 → Transcription for piano solo of Brahms' Ungarische Tänze, WoO 1. Published by Augener Limited.)
Ungarische Tänze	260	No. 9	E minor	Allegro - Poco sostenuto		1904	(Note: MoszWV 260 → Transcription for piano solo of Brahms' Ungarische Tänze, WoO 1. Published by Augener Limited.)
Ungarische Tänze	260	No. 10	E major	Presto		1904	(Note: MoszWV 260 → Transcription for piano solo of Brahms' Ungarische Tänze, WoO 1. Published by Augener Limited.)
Valse	261	No. 1 (Minute Waltz)	D♭ major	Vivace		1919	(Note: MoszWV 261 → Transcription for piano of Frédéric Chopin's Minute Waltz, Opus 64, No. 1. Dedicated to Countess Delfina Potocka, née Komar. Published by Peters.)
Toccata	262	—	C major	Allegro commodo		1919	(Note: MoszWV 262 → Transcription for piano of Carl Czerny's Toccata, Opus 92. Published by Julius Hainauer.)
Étude	263	—	—	—		1906	(Note: MoszWV 263 → Transcription for piano solo of Carl Czerny's Étude.)
Jupiter Symphonie	264	—	—	—		1891	(Note: MoszWV 264 → Transcription for two pianos (four hands) of Mozart's Jupiter Symphonie.)
Havanaise	265	—	—	—		—	(Note: MoszWV 265 → Indication of the existence of Saint-Saëns's Havanaise (manuscript) in France (private property).)
Zwei Etüden	?	No. 1	E♭ major	Allegro con brio		?	(Note: Étude → The two études attributed to Paul de Schlözer and published by him as Op. 1 (his only known published work), are believed by some historians to have actually been written by Moszkowski. The similarities between de Schlözer's Étude No. 2 in A♭ major and the 11th of Moszkowski’s 15 Études de Virtuosité, Op. 72, also in A♭ major, are striking. However, it may be that these similarities themselves gave rise to the legend that the de Schlözer pieces were written by Moszkowski. The story goes that Moszkowski wrote them, but lost the manuscript in a card game to Schlözer, who first published them in Viena through Schreiber in 1875-1876 as his own works.)
Zwei Etüden	?	No. 2	A♭ major	Allegro ma non troppo		?	

== Additional information ==
=== References ===
- Sadie, Stanley; Tyrrell, John (2001); The New Grove Dictionary of Music and Musicians, Grove, New York, ISBN 9781561592395
- Assenov, Bojan (2010); Moritz Moszkowski (1854–1925). Biographie und Werkverzeichnis, Göttingen, Hainholz Verlag, ISBN 9783869882109
- Feofanov, Dmitry (1984); I. Glinka, Michail; Rare Masterpieces of Russian Piano Music Ed. Dover Publications, New York, ISBN 9780486246598
