= The Dance =

The Dance may refer to:

== Art ==
- The Dance (Picasso), a painting by Picasso
- The Dance II, a 1932 mural by Henri Matisse
- Dance (Matisse), a 1910 painting by Henri Matisse

== Film and television ==
- The Dance (1959 film), Spanish film
- The Dance (1962 film), French film
- The Dance (1998 film), Icelandic film
- "The Dance" (Dawson's Creek), a 1998 television episode

== Music ==
- The Dance (Fleetwood Mac album) (1997)
- The Dance (Dave Koz album) (1999)
- The Dance (Faithless album) (2010)
- The Dance (EP), an EP by Within Temptation
- "The Dance" (song), a song by Garth Brooks
- "The Dance", three songs by Laraaji from Day of Radiance
- "The Dance", a song by the Music from The Music

== See also ==
- Dance (disambiguation)
- La Danse (disambiguation)
- La Dance (disambiguation)
