= List of compositions for piano left-hand and orchestra =

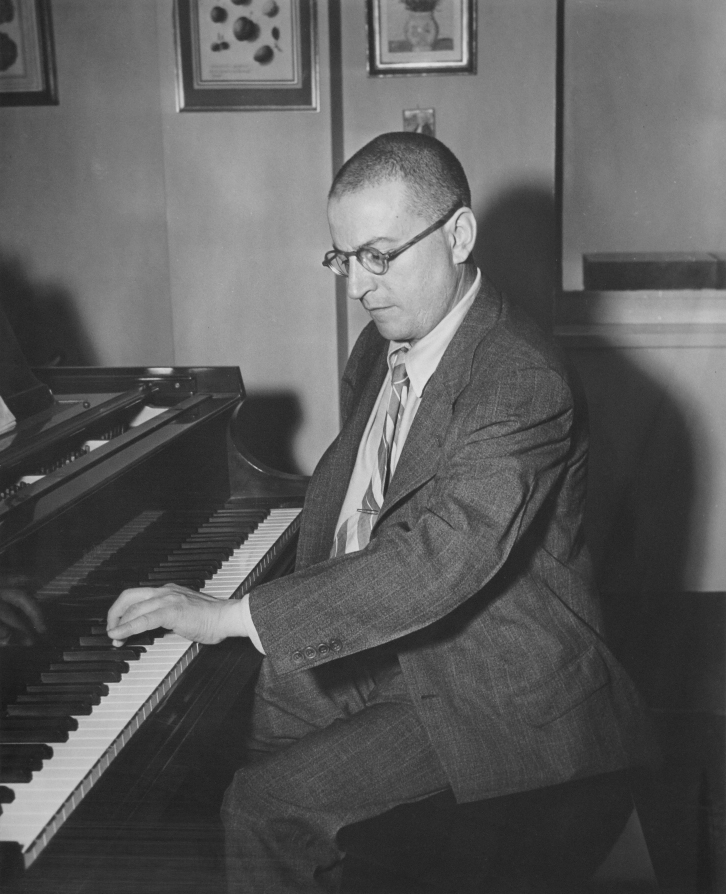
Paul Wittgenstein at the piano

This is a list of concertos and concertante works for piano left-hand and orchestra.

The best known left-hand concerto is the Piano Concerto for the Left Hand in D by Maurice Ravel, which was written for Paul Wittgenstein between 1929 and 1930. Wittgenstein, who lost his right arm in World War I, commissioned a number of such works around that time, as did Otakar Hollmann. More recently, Gary Graffman has commissioned a number of left-hand concertos.

== List ==
Composer	Work	Year
Hans Abrahamsen	Left, alone	2015
Mario Alfagüell	First Concerto for piano left hand and small orchestra, Op. 145	2003
Mario Alfagüell	Second Concerto for piano left hand and orchestra, Op. 185	2007
Josef Bartovský	Piano Concerto No. 2 for left hand (written for Hollmann)	1952
Arnold Bax	Concertante for Piano (Left Hand) and Orchestra (written for Harriet Cohen)	1948
William Bolcom	Gaea for Two Pianos Left Hand and Orchestra (commissioned by Graffman for him to play with Leon Fleisher)	1996
Sergei Bortkiewicz	Piano Concerto No. 2 for the Left Hand, Op. 28 (commissioned by Wittgenstein)	1924
Rudolf Braun	Piano Concerto in A minor (written for Wittgenstein)	1927
Benjamin Britten	Diversions for Piano Left Hand and Orchestra (commissioned by Wittgenstein)	1940
C. Curtis-Smith	Concerto for piano (left hand) and orchestra (commissioned by Leon Fleisher)	1991
Richard Danielpour	Piano Concerto No. 3 Zodiac Variations	2002
Norman Demuth	Piano Concerto for the left hand (commissioned by Wittgenstein)	1947
Norman Demuth	Legend for piano left hand and orchestra (commissioned by Wittgenstein)	1949
Lukas Foss	Piano Concerto for the Left Hand	1993
Alberto Ginastera	Second movement of the Piano concerto no. 2 (Scherzo per la mano sinistra)	1972
Daron Hagen	Seven Last Words: Concerto for Piano Left Hand and Orchestra (commissioned by Graffman)	2002
David Haynes	Concerto No. 1 for Left Hand and orchestra	1999
Paul Hindemith	Klaviermusik mit Orchester, Op. 29 (commissioned by Wittgenstein but never played by him; premiered in 2004 by Leon Fleisher)	1923
Shin’ichirō Ikebe	Piano Concerto No. 3 "To a West Wind" (commissioned by Izumi Tateno)	2013
Igor Ivanek	INRI, Concerto for piano left hand alone and orchestra	2006
Leoš Janáček	Capriccio for piano left hand and chamber ensemble (suggested by Otakar Hollmann but not written for him specifically)	1926
Erich Wolfgang Korngold	Piano Concerto in C♯ for the left hand, Op. 17 (commissioned by Wittgenstein)	1923
Josef Labor	Concert piece in the form of variations for piano left-hand and orchestra (composed for Wittgenstein)	1916
Josef Labor	Concert Piece in F minor (commissioned by Wittgenstein, who premiered it in 1936)	1917
Josef Labor	Concert Piece in B♭ minor (E flat major?)	1923
Kurt Leimer	Piano Concerto No. 2 (in one movement)	1944–48
Ben Lunn	History Needs... concerto for left-hand piano and strings (written for Nicholas McCarthy)	2023
Bohuslav Martinů	Concertino (later renamed Divertimento) for piano left hand and chamber orchestra, H. 173 (commissioned by Hollmann)	1926
Pehr Henrik Nordgren	Concerto for piano left hand and chamber orchestra, Op. 129	2004
Dieter Nowka	Piano Concerto for the Left Hand, Op. 71	1971
Luis Prado	Piano Concerto for the left hand (Concierto de piano para la mano izquierda, written for Gary Graffman, 2001 and premiered by him in 2002)	2001
Sergei Prokofiev	Piano Concerto No. 4 for the left hand, Op. 53 (commissioned by Wittgenstein but never played by him; premiered in 1956 by Siegfried Rapp)	1931
Maurice Ravel	Piano Concerto for the Left Hand in D (commissioned by Wittgenstein)	1929–30
Ned Rorem	Piano Concerto No. 4 for the Left Hand (commissioned by Gary Graffman)	1993
Franz Schmidt	Concertante Variations on a Theme of Beethoven (commissioned by Wittgenstein)	1923
Franz Schmidt	Piano Concerto No. 2, for the Left Hand (commissioned by Wittgenstein)	1934
Gunther Schuller	Concerto for 3 Hands (written for Lorin Hollander and Leon Fleisher)	1990
Eduard Schütt	Paraphrase for piano and orchestra (written for Wittgenstein)	1929
Lucijan Marija Škerjanc	Concerto for piano left hand and orchestra	1963
Stanisław Skrowaczewski	Concerto Niccolò for Piano Left Hand and Orchestra	2003
Raoul Sosa	Concerto for piano left hand with string orchestra	1989
Richard Strauss	Parergon zur "Sinfonia Domestica" for Piano and Orchestra, Op. 73 (commissioned by Wittgenstein)	1927
Richard Strauss	Panathenäenzug: Sinfonische Etüden in Form einer Passacaglia for Piano and Orchestra, Op. 74 (commissioned by Wittgenstein)	1925
Alexandre Tansman	Concert Piece for Piano and Orchestra	1943
Johannes Paul Thilman	Concertino for piano (left hand) and orchestra, Op. 65	1954
Karl Weigl	Concerto for the left hand	1924
Takashi Yoshimatsu	Concerto for Piano Left Hand and Chamber Orchestra "Cepheus Note", Op. 102 (commissioned by Izumi Tateno)	2007
Takashi Yoshimatsu	Concerto for Piano Left Hand and Orchestra "Cepheus Note", Op. 102a (revised version of Op. 102)	2007
Géza Zichy	Piano Concerto in E♭ for the left hand (written for himself to play)	1895
Ján Zimmer	Piano Concerto No. 5 for the Left Hand, Op. 50	1961

== Works for the right hand only ==
Works for piano right-hand only also exist, but there are far fewer of them than for left-hand only.

Concertante works involving piano right-hand include:

- Henri Cliquet-Pleyel (1894–1963) – Concerto for Piano Right Hand and Orchestra
- Arthur Bliss – Concerto for Two Pianos (3 Hands) and Orchestra, Op. 17 (1968; originally for tenor, piano, strings and percussion; then arranged for 2 pianos and orchestra for Phyllis Sellick and Cyril Smith; then arranged by Bliss and Clifford Phillips for 2 pianos 3 hands and orchestra)
- Malcolm Arnold – Concerto for Two Pianos Three Hands and Orchestra (also known as Concerto for Phyllis and Cyril), 1969. One pianist plays with both hands, the other with the right hand only.
- Gordon Jacob – Concerto for Three Hands on One Piano, 1969 (written for Sellick and Smith).
