= Piano Concerto in E-flat major =

Piano Concerto in E-flat major may refer to:

- Piano Concerto No. 9 (Mozart)
- Piano Concerto No. 10 (Mozart)
- Piano Concerto No. 14 (Mozart)
- Piano Concerto No. 22 (Mozart)
- Piano Concerto No. 0 (Beethoven)
- Piano Concerto No. 5 (Beethoven)
- Piano Concerto No. 1 (Liszt)
- Piano Concerto No. 3 (Liszt)
- Piano Concerto No. 3 (Saint-Saëns)
- Piano Concerto No. 3 (Tchaikovsky)
- Piano Concerto (Massenet)
- Piano Concerto (John Ireland)
