= Piano concerto =

Type of concerto consisting of a solo piano composition accompanied by an orchestra

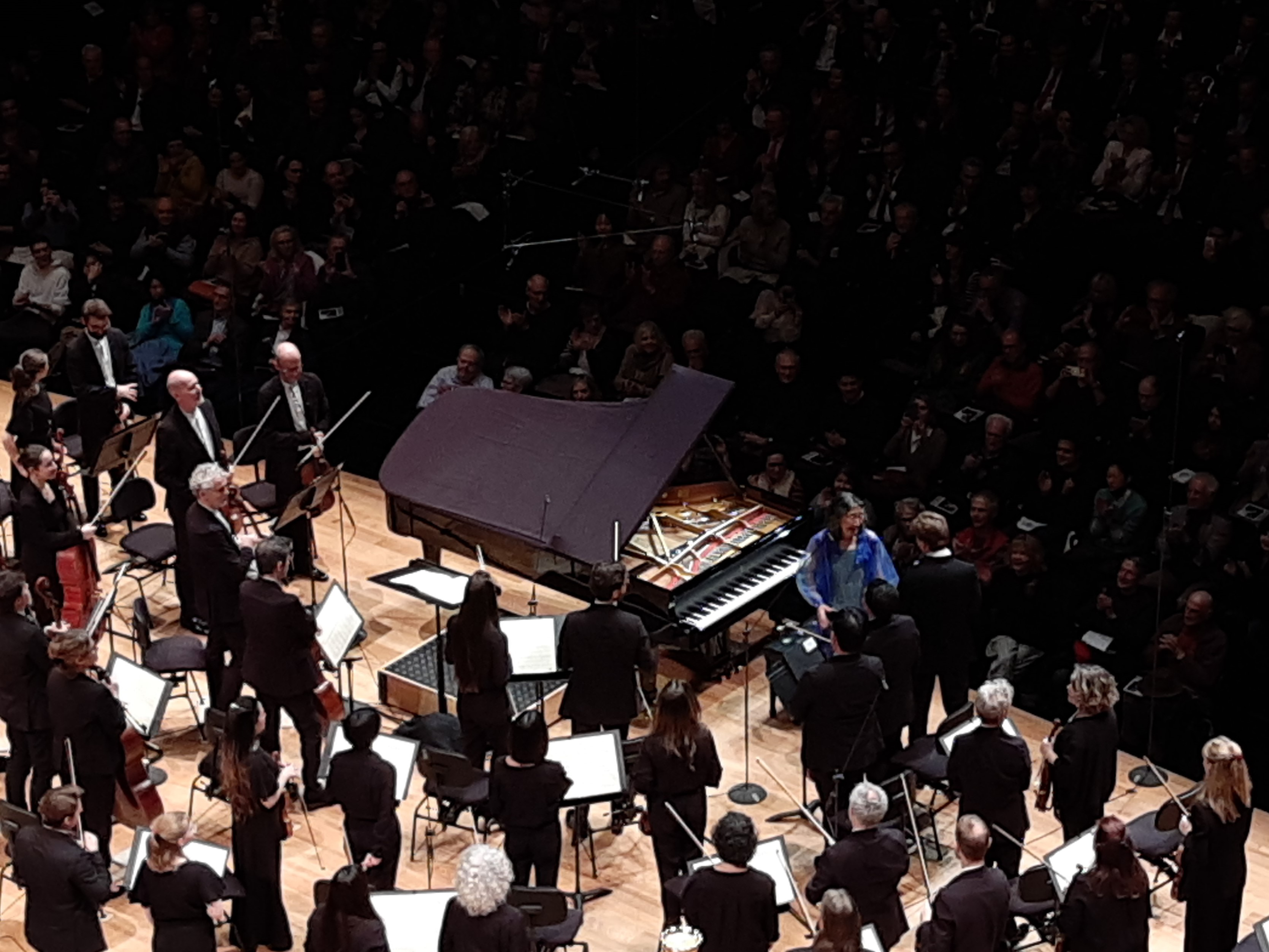
Beethoven's Piano Concerto No.3 about to be performed at the Philarmonie de Paris by Mitsuko Uchida

A piano concerto, a type of concerto, is a solo composition in the classical music genre which is composed for piano accompanied by an orchestra or other large ensemble. Piano concertos are typically virtuosic showpieces which require an advanced level of technique. Piano concertos are typically written out in music notation, including sheet music for the pianist (which is typically memorized for a more virtuosic performance), orchestral parts, and a full score for the conductor.

The standard practice in the Baroque and Classical eras (together spanning from circa 1600 to circa 1800), was for the orchestra to provide subordinate accompaniment over which the piano plays solo parts. However, at the end of the classical era, the orchestra had an equal role to the pianist and frequently had "dialogue" or "conversation" between the two. When music students and music competition auditionees play piano concertos, the orchestra part may be performed in an orchestral reduction, a conversion of the orchestra parts into a part for an accompanist playing piano or pipe organ, as it is very expensive to hire a full orchestra. Keyboard concertos were common in the time of Johann Sebastian Bach in the Baroque music era, during the Classical period and during the Romantic music era (1800–1910). Keyboard concertos are also written by contemporary classical music composers. Twentieth- and 21st-century piano concertos may include experimental or unusual performance techniques. In the 20th and 21st centuries, J. S. Bach's harpsichord concertos are sometimes played on piano. There are variant types of piano concertos, including double piano concertos, for two solo pianists and orchestra, and double or triple (or larger solo groups) concertos in which the piano soloist is joined by a violinist, cellist, or another instrumentalist.

== History ==
The earliest piano concertos were composed in London, inspired by instrument maker Johannes Zumpe. Composers such as Johann Sebastian Bach, Georg Friedrich Händel and Carl Friedrich Abel began writing concertos for harpsichord and string ensemble in about 1730.

During the Classical era, the form quickly took hold across Europe, especially Germany and Austria, becoming established with works especially by Mozart, along with lesser-known examples by Haydn, Carl Phillip Emanuel Bach, Jan Ladislav Dussek, Carl Stamitz, and Joseph Wölfl. In the early Romantic period the piano concerto repertoire was added to most notably by Beethoven, Schumann, Mendelssohn, Chopin, Hummel, Ferdinand Ries, and John Field.

Well-known examples from the middle to late Romantic era include concertos by Edvard Grieg, Johannes Brahms, Camille Saint-Saëns, Franz Liszt, Pyotr Ilyich Tchaikovsky, and Sergei Rachmaninoff. Alexander Scriabin, Antonín Dvořák, Edward MacDowell, and Franz Xaver Scharwenka wrote some lesser-known concertos during this time. In 1899, Amy Beach completed her Piano Concerto in C-sharp minor, the first piano concerto composed by a female American composer. Edward Elgar made sketches for a piano concerto but never completed it. In the 19th century, Henry Litolff blurred the boundary between piano concerto and symphony in his five works entitled Concerto Symphonique, and Ferruccio Busoni added a male choir in the last movement of his hour-long concerto. Wilhelm Furtwängler wrote his Symphonic Concerto for Piano and Orchestra, which lasts more than one hour, in 1924–1937. In a more general sense, the term "piano concerto" could extend to the numerous often programmatic concerted works for piano and orchestra from the era – Beethoven's Choral Fantasy. Liszt's Totentanz and Ruins of Athens Variations, and Richard Strauss's Burleske are only a few of the hundreds of such works. The few well-known piano concertos that dominate 20th-century and 21st-century concert programs and discographies are only a small part of the repertoire that proliferated on the European music scene during the 19th century.

=== 20th century and contemporary ===
The piano concerto form survived through the 20th century into the 21st, with examples being written by Leroy Anderson, Milton Babbitt, Samuel Barber, Béla Bartók, Arthur Bliss, Edwin York Bowen, Benjamin Britten, Elliott Carter, Carlos Chávez, Aaron Copland, Peter Maxwell Davies, Emma Lou Diemer, Keith Emerson, George Gershwin, Alberto Ginastera, Philip Glass, Ferde Grofé, Yalil Guerra, Lou Harrison, Airat Ichmouratov, Vítězslava Kaprálová, Nikolai Kapustin, Aram Khachaturian, György Ligeti, Magnus Lindberg, Witold Lutosławski, Gian Francesco Malipiero, Frank Martin, Bohuslav Martinů, Nikolai Medtner, Peter Mennin, Peter Mieg, Selim Palmgren, Dora Pejačević, Willem Pijper, Francis Poulenc, Sergei Prokofiev, Behzad Ranjbaran, Einojuhani Rautavaara, Maurice Ravel, Alfred Schnittke, Arnold Schoenberg, Peter Sculthorpe, Peter Seabourne, Dmitri Shostakovich, Roger Smalley, Arthur Somervell, Igor Stravinsky, Heinrich Sutermeister, Alexander Tcherepnin, Michael Tippett, Ralph Vaughan Williams, Heitor Villa-Lobos, Carl Vine, Pancho Vladigerov, Charles Wuorinen, Takashi Yoshimatsu and others.

==== Works for piano left-hand and orchestra ====
The Austrian Paul Wittgenstein lost his right arm during World War I, and on resuming his musical career asked a number of composers to write pieces for him that required the left hand only. The Czech Otakar Hollmann, whose right arm was injured in the war, did likewise but to a lesser degree. The results of these commissions include concertante pieces for orchestra and piano left hand by Bortkiewicz, Britten, Hindemith, Janáček, Korngold, Martinů, Prokofiev, Ravel, Franz Schmidt, Richard Strauss, and others.

=== Works for two or more pianists and orchestra ===
Concertos and concert works for two solo pianos have been written by Johann Sebastian Bach (two to four pianos, BWV 1060–65, actually harpsichord concertos, but often performed on pianos), Wolfgang Amadeus Mozart (two, K 242 (originally for three pianos and orchestra) and K 365), Felix Mendelssohn (two, 1823–4), Max Bruch (1912), Béla Bartók (1927/1932, a reworking of his Sonata for two pianos and percussion), Francis Poulenc (1932), Arthur Bliss (1924), Arthur Benjamin (1938), Peter Mieg (1939–41), Darius Milhaud (1941 and 1951), Bohuslav Martinů (1943), Ralph Vaughan Williams (c. 1946), Roy Harris (1946), Gian Francesco Malipiero (two works, both 1957), Walter Piston (1959), Luciano Berio (1973), and Harald Genzmer (1990). Apart from the Bach and Mozart examples, works for more than two pianos and orchestra are considerably rarer, but have been written by Morton Gould (Inventions for four pianos and orchestra, 1954), Peter Racine Fricker (Concertante for three pianos, timpani, and strings, 1951), Wolfgang Fortner (Triplum for three pianos and orchestra, 1966) and Georg Friedrich Haas (limited approximations for six microtonally tuned pianos and orchestra, 2010).

The concerto for piano four hands is a rare genre, but Leopold Koželuch (1747–1818) wrote one (in B♭ major, P IV: 8), and Alfred Schnittke (1934–1998) wrote another (in 1988).

== Characteristics ==
=== Form ===
A classical piano concerto is often in three movements, as follows.

1. A moderately quick opening movement in sonata allegro form often including a virtuoso cadenza (which may be improvised by the soloist)
2. A slow movement that is freer and more expressive and lyrical. Usually in Ternary form
3. A faster rondo

Examples by Mozart and Beethoven follow this model, but many others do not. Beethoven's Piano Concerto No. 4 includes a last-movement cadenza, and many other composers introduced innovations. For example, Liszt's second and third concertos are played without breaks between the different sections, Brahms's Piano Concerto No. 2, Liszt's Piano Concerto No. 1 and Moszkowski's Piano Concerto No. 2 have 4 movements and Tchaikovsky's Piano Concerto No. 3 in E♭ major has only one (Allegro brillante).

== See also ==
- List of compositions for piano and orchestra
- List of piano concertos by key
- List of works for piano left-hand and orchestra
- Concerto for Two Pianos and Orchestra (disambiguation)
- Concerto for solo piano
