= The Snow Queen (Abrahamsen) =

2019 opera by Hans Abrahamsen

- Opera in three acts by Hans Abrahamsen
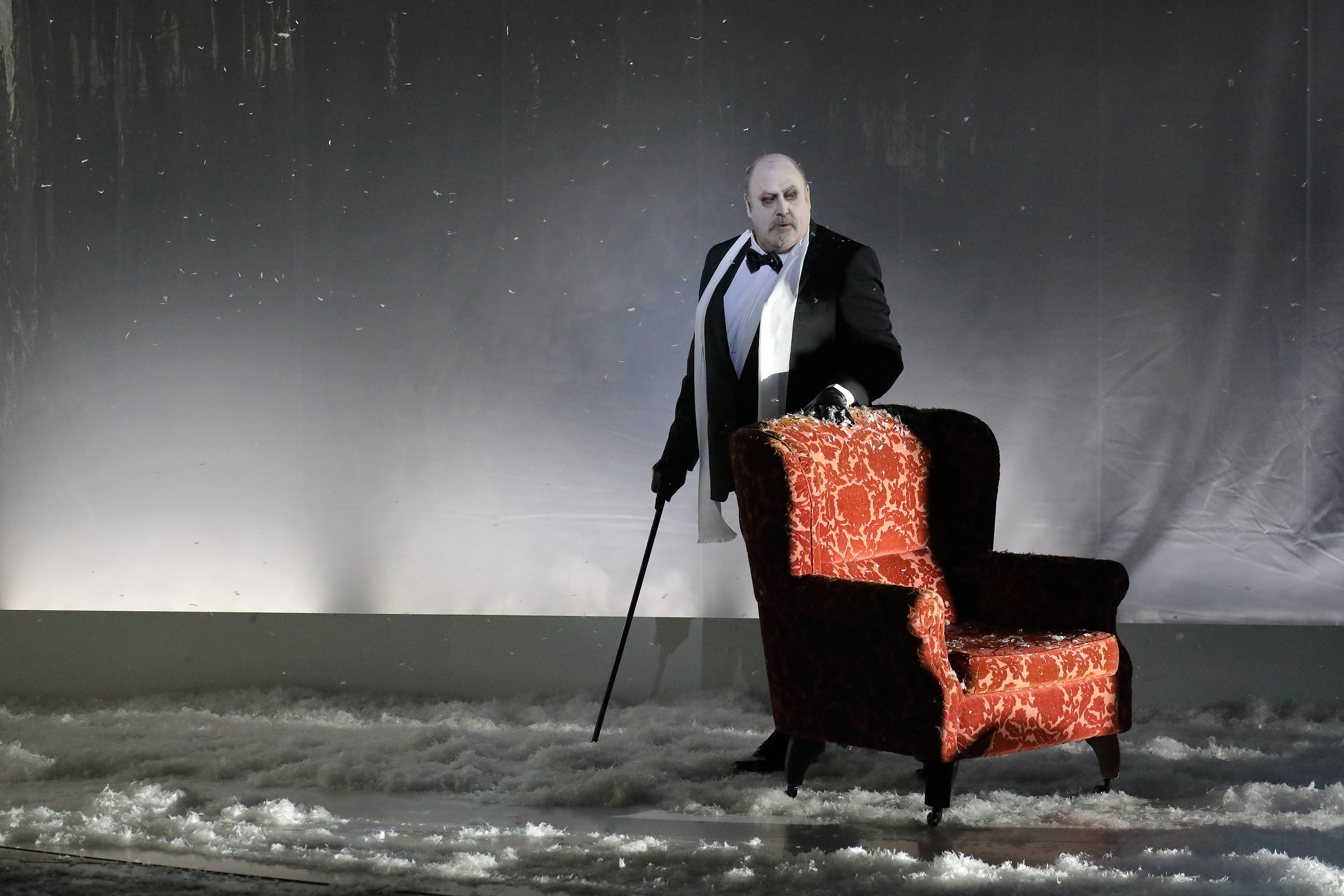
- The Snow Queen 2019 at Bavarian State Opera (Snow Queen: Peter Rose) staged by Andreas Kriegenburg
- Librettist: Hans Abrahamsen, Henrik Engelbrecht
- Language: Danish, English
- Based on: "The Snow Queen" by Hans Christian Andersen
- Premiere: 13 October 2019; Royal Danish Opera

The Snow Queen is an opera by Hans Abrahamsen and was commissioned by the Royal Danish Opera. The world premiere in Danish took place on 13 October 2019 in Copenhagen. On 21 December 2019 the English version was premiered at the Bavarian State Opera in Munich. The work is based on the fairy tale "The Snow Queen" (Danish title: "Snedronningen") by Hans Christian Andersen and the libretto is by Hans Abrahamsen and Henrik Engelbrecht.

== Roles ==
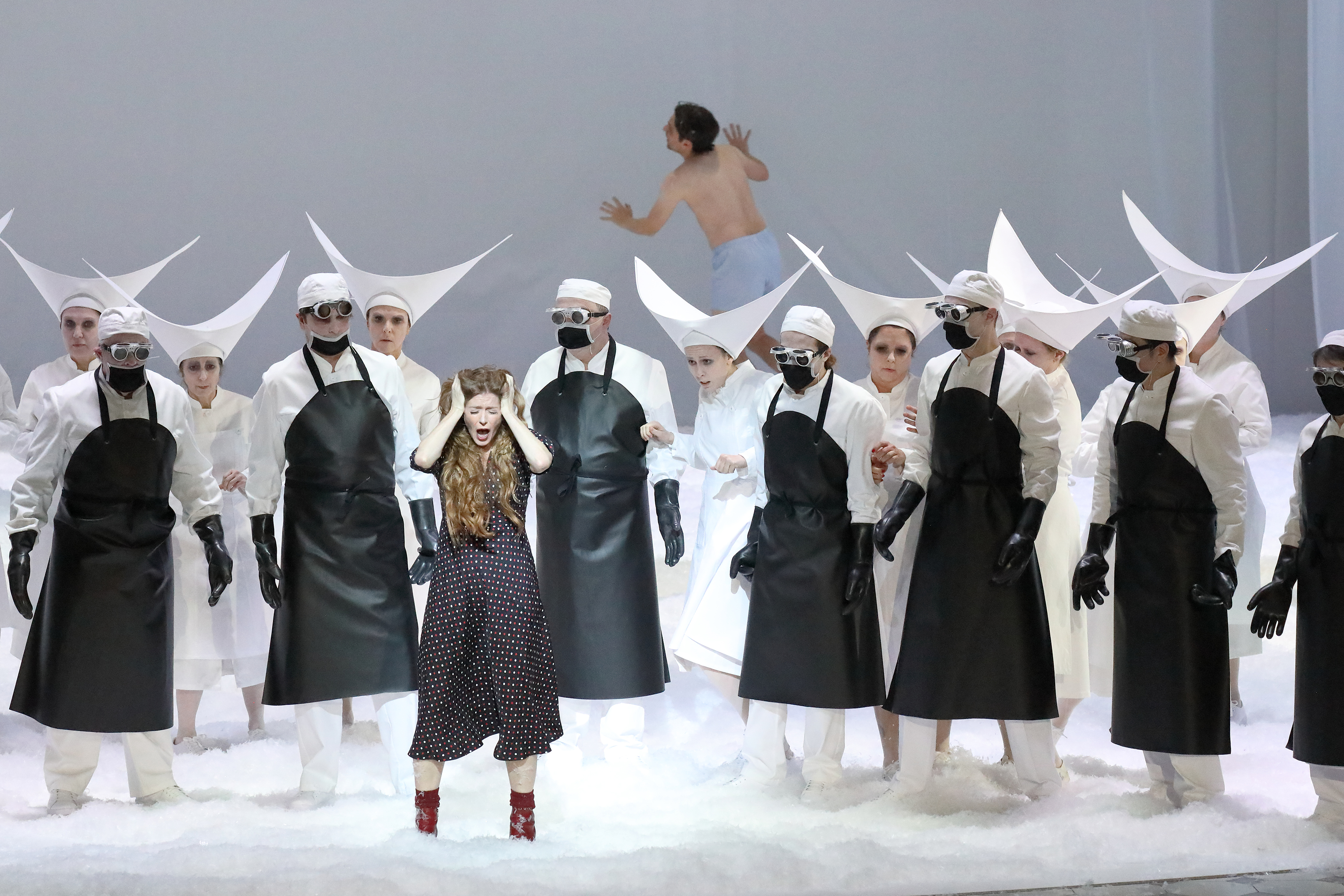
The Snow Queen 2019 at Bavarian State Opera (Gerda: Barbara Hannigan) staged by Andreas Kriegenburg

Roles, voice types, premiere cast
Role	Voice type	English premiere cast, 21 December 2019	French premiere cast, 15 September 2021	Dutch premiere cast, 4 June 2022
Gerda	soprano	Barbara Hannigan	Lauren Snouffer	Mari Eriksmoen
Kay	mezzo-soprano	Rachael Wilson	Rachael Wilson	Rachael Wilson
Grandmother; Old Lady; Finn Woman	soprano	Katarina Dalayman	Helena Rasker	Helena Rasker
Princess	soprano	Caroline Wettergreen	Floriane Derthe	Rainelle Krause
Prince	tenor	Dean Power	Moritz Kallenberg	Lucas van Lierop
Forest Crow	tenor	Kevin Conners	Michael Smallwood	Paul Curievici
Castle Crow	countertenor	Owen Willetts	Owen Willetts	Owen Willetts
Snow Queen; Reindeer; Clock	bass	Peter Rose	David Leigh	Seth Carico
Choir		Bavarian State Opera Chorus; Bavarian State Orchestra; Conductor: Cornelius Meister		Groot Omroepkoor; Conductor: Benjamin Goodson

== Synopsis ==
The plot of The Snow Queen is based on the fairy tale "The Snow Queen" by Hans Christian Andersen, which consists of seven episodes. Hans Abrahamsen and Henrik Engelbrecht developed the opera libretto for The Snow Queen from this while largely retaining the language characteristics of the fairytale.

=== Act 1 ===
The children Gerda and Kay listen to the Grandmother telling them about the Snow Queen, whereupon Kay imagines bringing the Snow Queen into the warm room and watching her melt. Gerda tells him how the devil created a magic mirror which makes everything beautiful look ugly and that it has broken into a million tiny pieces. She explains that anyone getting one of these splinters in their eye or heart would only see the imperfections in things; the coldness causing their hearts to become numb. That night, Kay is so afraid that he cannot fall asleep. When he sees the Snow Queen at the window he is terrified.

While Gerda and Kay look at the blooming roses Kay is suddenly pierced by something into his heart and then into his eye. From this moment on, he too only sees the imperfection of the flowers whereupon he mocks Gerda and picks the roses to pieces.

The friendship between Kay and Gerda is weakened. Instead of playing with her, Kay would rather play with the other boys who do not let him join their game. At the same time Kay admires the symmetry and perfection of the ice crystals. The Snow Queen appears on her sled and takes the boy with her.

The Snow Queen flies with Kay to her ice palace. She kisses him on the forehead, causing him to lose his feeling of coldness and forget the world he once knew.

=== Act 2 ===
Gerda has begun the search for Kay and finds herself in the Old Woman's garden where the flowers sing her the song of the three dead sisters. But Kay, they announce, is not dead. Gerda leaves the garden and continues her search.

Upon meeting the Forest Crow, Gerda learns that the princess has been looking for a man who is her equal in wisdom. Since Gerda suspects that Kay might be the chosen one the Forest Crow brings her to the castle of Prince and Princess. Arriving at the Castle, the Castle Crow allows Gerda to enter but is immediately haunted by sinister and eerie apparitions. When she finally finds the princess and her prince, she realizes her mistake. The Prince and Princess reward the Crows for their good deed and promise to help Gerda. Gerda is permitted to sleep in the Prince's bed. In a dream she sees Kay on his sleigh.

=== Act 3 ===
The prince and princess have given Gerda their golden coach so she can continue her search for Kay. In the forest, the carriage is ambushed by robbers, killing all the travelers except Gerda. With the help of the reindeer, which takes Gerda further north, she meets the Finn Woman. The reindeer tells the Finn Woman how Gerda was held captive by the robbers and about the assumption that Kay is with the Snow Queen. The Finn Woman eventually explains the background of Kay's disappearance. She encourages Gerda in her search but declines to endow her with special powers, for Gerda is already in possession of all the abilities she needs to find Kay. She instructs the reindeer to take Gerda to the Snow Queen's kingdom and then return.

Arriving in the Snow Queen's kingdom, the reindeer bids farewell to Gerda, kissing her on the mouth and weeping. The cold hits her and the Snow Queen's outposts urge her to turn back. But the angels that arise from her breath protect her from the threat.

Meanwhile, in the Snow Queen's ice palace, Kay is confronted with the task of finding the perfect word but he is almost petrified with cold and despair. The Snow Queen has left the palace. When Gerda finally finds him, both begin to cry. Through the tears, Kay is freed from the splinters in his eyes and heart. Together Gerda and Kay discover the word ‘eternity’.

When Gerda and Kay return home, the grandmother is still reading a picture book. But Kay and Gerda have grown up yet remained children at heart. It is summer again.

== Music ==
=== Compositional technique ===
Hans Abrahamsen's works are characterized by complex structures. The composer himself describes his compositional style as technically and rhythmically difficult. Furthermore, the feeling which shall be expressed through music is dependent on the form, this is also evident in his creative process, which is based, for example, on the elaboration of a time structure within which the music will unfold. In an interview with the magazine Max Joseph, Abrahamsen says: "Music is very special, because it exists in time, and as a composer I must shape time".

The Snow Queen has a very large orchestration, which allows for the variety of sounds that Abrahamsen plays with in his composition.

Hans Abrahamsen's work is often described with the term New Simplicity. However, this is only partially true due to the consistent development of his compositional style.

=== Instrumentation ===
The Snow Queen is scored for:

- woodwinds: 4 flutes (all piccolo, 3. alto flute, 4. alto flute and bass flute), 2 oboe, cor anglais, 4 clarinets (2. and 4. bass clarinet, 3. and 4. E-flat clarinet), 3 bassoons (2. and 3. contrabassoon)
- brass: 6 French horns (5. and 6. Wagner tuba), 2 trumpets, 2 bass trumpets, 3 trombones, tuba
- percussion: timpani, percussion (xylophone, marimba, glockenspiel, vibraphone, tubular bells, small tubular drums, bass drums, snare drum, congas, tambourins, cymbal, tam-tam, wind machine, jingle bell, sandpaper, egg shaker, claves, güiro, triangle, whip)
- 2 harps
- accordion
- keyboard instruments: synthesizer, celesta
- strings: violin 1, violin 2, viola, cello, double bass

== History ==
=== Composition and historic context ===
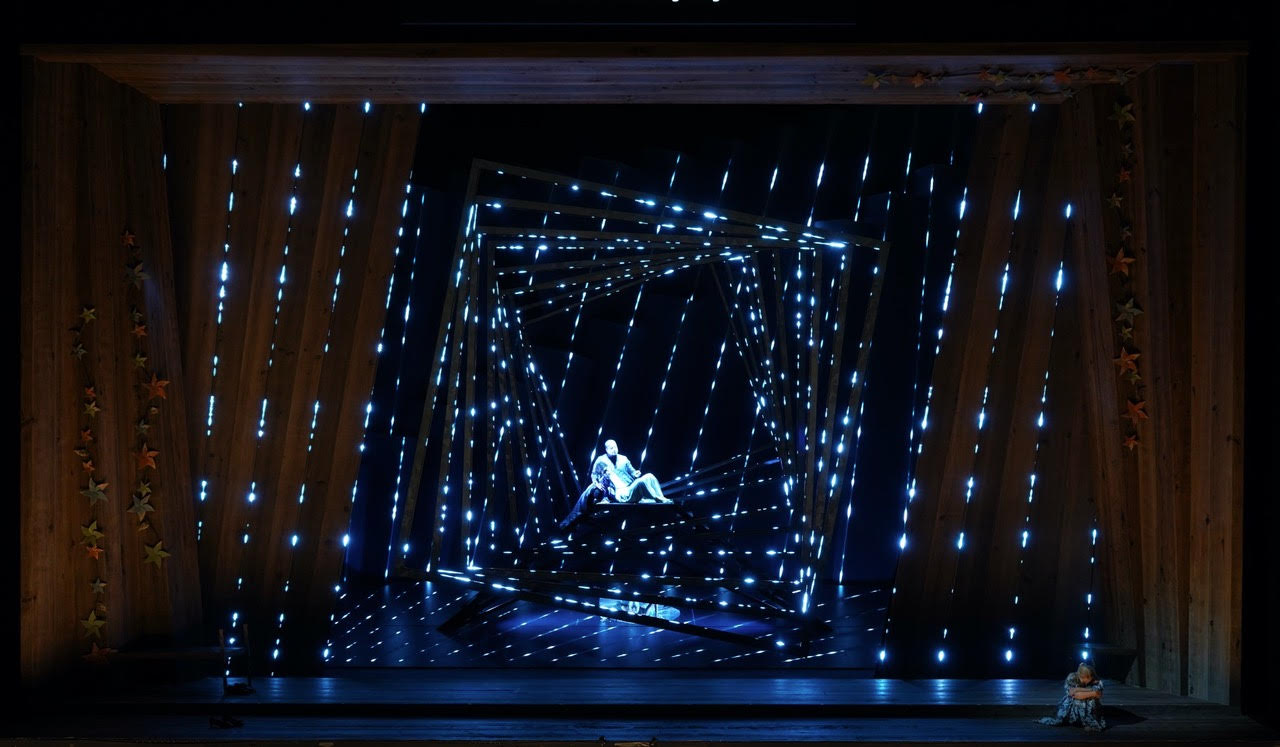
The Snow Queen. World premiere at the Royal Danish Opera, staged by Francisco Negrin, October 2019. Photo by Francisco Negrin

Abrahamsen had already made his first compositional attempts to write a vocal work in the 1970s. He had originally conceived his piece Winternacht, based on the poem of the same name by Georg Trakl, as a piece for soprano and instrumental ensemble: "I [...] first designed the instrumental part, painted the background like a painter, so to speak. Then I wanted to add the text with the singing voice, like a painter inserts his figures into the background landscape. But I couldn't find the music for this figure, the soprano, and so my Winternacht became, in a certain sense, a 'song without words'". Nevertheless, Abrahamsen was keen to compose a work in the field of music theatre. This project was supported by Hans Werner Henze, among others, who suggested to the composer that he compose an opera as early as the 1980s in view of the early Münchener Biennale.

It was only when he was working on his composition Schnee that Abrahamsen took up the idea of a music theatre piece again. At this time he was deeply involved with the theme of snow and in this context he also read Hans Christian Andersen's fairy tale "The Snow Queen". Abrahamsen associated its episodic form with his work Märchenbilder, which, based on Robert Schumann's chamber music piece for viola and piano, deals with the idea of assembling stories from pictures. Based on the design of the fairy tale, Abrahamsen developed an opera libretto in collaboration with the dramaturg Henrik Engelbrecht, which takes into account selected scenes from the fairy tale while largely preserving the original language. Inspired by the collaboration with the soprano Barbara Hannigan for the composition let me tell you, the desire grew to create an opera part for her voice.

A commission from the Royal Danish Opera in Copenhagen enabled Hans Abrahamsen to find time for the compositional process. The English version of The Snow Queen was written for a production with Barbara Hannigan at the Bavarian State Opera in collaboration with the British writer Amanda Holden.

=== Performance history ===
The Snow Queen was commissioned by the Royal Danish Opera Copenhagen. The opera was premiered there in Danish on 13 October 2019 in a production directed by Francisco Negrin.

The first performance of the English version took place on 21 December 2019 at the Bavarian State Opera under the musical direction of Cornelius Meister. The production is designed by Andreas Kriegenburg.

First impressions of the resulting opera were gained from the Drei Märchenbilder, based on the orchestral part of the first act of The Snow Queen, which was performed at the 1st Academy Concert of the Bavarian State Orchestra under the musical direction of Constantinos Carydis in October 2018.
