= Alesh Jermar =

Czech-American post modernist classical composer

- (Aleš Ferdinand Vilém Jermář)
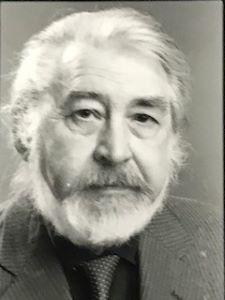
- Born: June 13, 1929
- Died: February 13, 2004 (age 74)
- Known for: A Czech post-modernist classical composer, film music composer, organist, pianist, and synthesizer player.
- Awards: Prizes at International Film Festivals in Cannes, Venice, Mexico City and Oberhausen.

Alesh Jermar (1929–2004) was a Czech post-modernist composer, film music composer, organist, pianist, and synthesizer player. While working in the Czechoslovak film and television industry, he composed music for over 200 short films, some of which received awards in international film festivals. He was also a dazzling performer praised for his interpretative brilliance, instrumental virtuosity, and exceptional improvisational skills.

== Biography ==
Alesh Jermar was the only child of the distinguished family of Vítĕzslav Viktor Jermář, a musician, chemist, and pharmaceutical manufacturer and Berta Jermářová, a pharmacist. His father's pharmaceutical factory was nationalized and incorporated into the state owned firm Spofa after February 1948.

During WWII, as a young teen, Alesh joined the "Marauding & Guerrilla Organization VELA," a Belgian resistance group fighting Nazi occupation. He served as a courier and delivered messages of the most serious military nature on skis or by bicycle. At times, he also skied in the mountains with dynamite on his back and learned how to use it to disrupt Nazi supply lines. At the end of the war, he was awarded a rank in the Czech army and a medal of honor (Czechoslovak War Cross) for his bravery.

== Studies and career ==
As a young boy, before he knew anything about improvisation, Alesh enjoyed "dreaming" at the piano; he already felt then that he wanted to become a performing artist and composer. He gave his first concert at the age of sixteen in Prague and received a sparkling review (and even a caricature) in the Prague nightly Večerní Praha. While still a student, he often concertized professionally on organ, piano, and harpsichord.

From 1947 to 1955, Alesh attended the State Conservatory and Academy of Musical Arts (AMU) in Prague. He concluded his advanced studies in music and film arts with a dissertation entitled Aesthetics of Stage and Film Music and a performance in the Rudolfinum (House of Artists), where he, accompanied by the Prague Symphony, performed his composition for organ and orchestra.

After his graduation, Alesh created and taught a course in the Aesthetics of Film Music at FAMU (The Film Faculty of the Academy for Performing Arts) in Prague but, being the son of a pharmaceutical factory owner in a country under communist rule, he was eventually asked to leave this position. After that, he accompanied live broadcasts of a popular television program Zvĕdavá kamera (Curious camera) with his improvisations and began to be noticed by young movie directors, who offered him work in the production of short films. From 1955 to 1964, he held the position of Staff Composer and Music Director in Czechoslovak State Film (ČSF) and Television (ČST). In addition, he often improvised live for children's marionette programs in Czechoslovak State Television (ČST). Fascinated with marionettes, he obtained a degree in puppetry and began collecting them.

== United States ==
Alesh Jermar had a life-long aversion to totalitarian control. His outspokenness, combined with growing international recognition of his musicianship, made him unpopular with the Communist regime that dominated every facet of life in the country. As a result, he experienced incarceration, beating, and betrayal. In 1964, he fled Czechoslovakia via Yugoslavia and Austria and emigrated to the USA, arriving in New York City. In 1971, the American Guild of Organists in New York City noted: "In a short time in the United States, Mr. Jermar has established himself as a musician, composer, and improviser of the highest caliber."

In 1975, Alesh settled in New London, Connecticut. He continued to compose music, teach piano to a few selected students, and concertize extensively in prestigious venues in the US and abroad.

== His Music ==
As a composer, Alesh Jermar favored a strong melody line and stressed melodiousness and creativity. Most of his compositions were spontaneously improvised and once finalized, he was able to keep them in memory and play them during his performances. He would notate his music only when he intended it to be performed by other musicians. His music complements visual imagery and often tells a story; its dramatic quality evokes a wide range of emotions that can easily translate into stage and film productions. As an organist, Alesh had an immense repertoire and, in addition, he could improvise in any style from any period. During his performances he often improvised on four or more random notes taken from the audience. One of his most notable works Fantasie pro lovou ruku a lidské svědomí (Fantasy for left hand and human conscience) was recorded in 1960. This composition inspired film director Pavel Hobl to make a short documentary film in which Otakar Hollmann, a Czech left-handed piano virtuoso, accompanied by the Czechoslovak Film Symphonic orchestra, FISYO, (directed by František Belfín), performed it against the backdrop of falling bombs and scenes of wartime suffering. This film, which carries a potent anti-war message, received prestigious prizes in the international film festivals in Cannes (1960), Leipzig (1961), Munich (1961) and Mexico City (1961). Subsequently, it was played at the film festivals and movie theatres throughout Czechoslovakia. A French recording company Barclay produced a single that was presented as a gift to every attendee of the film's screening in Cannes Film Festival that year.

== Music for Synthesizers ==
When one of his students introduced Alesh to synthesizers in the early 1980s, he was inspired to expand his musical focus. Synthesizers offered him a wide spectrum of sounds to be created, such as instruments of a symphony orchestra together with sounds of organ, harp, harpsichord, pealing bells, Spanish guitars, and human voices, They also enabled him to incorporate the sounds of nature, including authentic voices of whales, wolves, and loons. He combined his knowledge of Gregorian Chant and twentieth century classical music with his keen interest in new sounds and contemporary musical styles in order to create his new signature sound. The first piece recorded on synthesizers followed his visit to Norwegian fiords, capturing their peace and tranquility. This was followed by the CD entitled Crossway of Dreams, his first commercial recording since his award-winning Fantasy for the Left Hand and Human Conscience. Crossway of Dreams was inspired by nature, visual images, poems, fairy tales, and paintings of his friend Ivan Dobroruka, who designed the CD's cover. It could often be heard on the Hearts of Space radio station in the early nineties. Next came the recording entitled the Children of Atlantis, dedicated to children of the past, present and future. Concerned that too much dependence on media can sap children's ability to think and create, he intended to encourage them to dream, build fantasies, and inspire creativity. Alesh was also fascinated with nature and worried about the environment being polluted and destroyed.

== Notable works ==
- Fantasie pro levou ruku a lidské svĕdomí (Fantasy for left hand and human conscience), written for Otakar Hollmann, an internationally renowned left-handed Czech piano virtuoso
- Children of Atlantis (A Legend for Synthesizers)
- Stella Maris, for organ and whales; often performed by the Czech organ virtuoso Karel Paukert
- Helmet Full of Clay, originally for organ; also performed and recorded by author on synthesizers
- Suite from the Diary of a Molecule: 1. Clad In Light 2. Sea's Requiem For a Fisherman 3. Helmet Full Of Clay 4. Written With Raven's Wing
- Azrael - the Angel Of Death
- Toccata and Chorale in d minor (for organ)
- Sculptures on the Seashore (for piano)
- Praeludiums (for piano)
- Nocturnos (for piano)

== Awards ==
Alesh Jermar's film music received prizes at international film festivals in Cannes, Venice, Mexico City and Oberhausen.

== Discography ==
- Crossway of Dreams; a collection of musical visions inspired by paintings of Ivan Dobroruka, who also designed the cover; composed and performed by Alesh Jermar, produced by Houdaphone Productions (CD)
- Eternal Return; real time recordings of compositions for piano and synthesizers (CD)
- William Shakespeare's Sonnets No. 24, 35, 55 & 87; a boxed set includes a cassette tape and four etchings handprinted and colored by Ivan Dobroruka, music composed and performed on piano by Alesh Jermar, poetry read by Stephen Silver (also exists in digitized format)
- Fantasie pro levou ruku a lidské svědomí (Fantasy for left hand and human conscience); performed by Otakar Hollmann, accompanied by the Czech Film Symphonic Orchestra (FISYO) conducted by František Belfín; the recording produced by a French recording company Barclay, (also exists in digitized format)

== Filmography ==
- Fantasie pro levou ruku a lidské svědomí (Fantasy for left hand and human conscience); a documentary film directed by Pavel Hobl in 1960. A left-handed Czech virtuoso Otakar Hollmann, accompanied by the Czech Film Symphonic Orchestra, FISYO, conducted by František Belfín, performs this composition against the backdrop of falling bombs and scenes of wartime suffering (originally on beta-videotape, also exists as DVD & digitized format)
- Život Bohdana Kopeckého (Life of Bohdan Kopecký); director Jaroslav Šikl
- Dům času a slov (The house of time and words) & Vzdálenost od středu (Distance from the center); director Bohumil Sobotka
- Vajíčko (A little egg) & Objevy na hradě (Discoveries in the castle); director Zdeněk Kopáč
- Slnovrat (The solstice); director Evžen Šimko
- Koňský balet (Ballet of horses); awarded in a Film Festival in Oberhausen in 1960
- Kolik synů máme (How many sons we have); awarded in a Film Festival in Venice in 1963

== Sources ==
- A letter from Ústřední výbor partyzánské organisace VELA (Central Committee of the Guerrilla Organization VELA), div. generála JUDr. Josefa Koutňáka, Praha, 1. X. 1948. Print.
- Marie H Kurfirtova. A Portrait of a Czech Artist in Exile; Britské listy, 1. 6. 2021 https://blisty.cz/art/103975-a-portrait-of-a-czech-artist-in-exile.html Web.
- Film a doba: mĕsíčník pro otázky filmového umění, číslo 4/1961. Print.
- Filmový přehled: týdeník pro kulturní využití filmů, číslo 8/6.III. 1961. Print.
- Filmový přehled: týdeník pro kulturní využití filmů, číslo 20/29.V.1961. Print.
- Memento s klíčkem naděje. Rozhovor Jaroslavy Šteflové s Alešem Jermářem. Učitelské noviny, číslo 12, ročník 1992. Prague. Print.
- Bulletin. Museum of Cleveland, 1991, Print.
- New Czech Music to Be Heard. The Hartford Courant, March 23, 1969. Print.
- Jermar Weaves Magic & Music into Tapestry. Niantic News, July 19, 1989. Print.
- Music With the Potential to Heal, Norwich Bulletin, Section C; October 16, 1989. Print.
- Na besedě s Alešem Jermářem. Zpravodajství XV. Filmového festivalu pracujících, číslo 13, ročník 1964. Print.
- Program notes for the Organ Recital by Karel Paukert in Memory of Aleš Jermář on June 14, 2004, at the St. James Episcopal Church in New London, CT, written by Tom Castle. Print.
- Utah State University and Cache Civic Concerts program, 1976. Print.
