= Jan Zimmer (disambiguation) =

Jan Zimmer may refer to:

- Ján Zimmer (1926–1993), Slovak post-romantic composer
- Hans Zimmer (born 1957), German film composer and music producer
- Jean Zimmer (born 1992), German footballer
