= Left, alone =

Composition by Hans Abrahamse

Left, alone is a piano concerto for the left hand and orchestra by the Danish composer Hans Abrahamsen. The work was commissioned by the Westdeutscher Rundfunk and co-commissioned by the City of Birmingham Symphony Orchestra, the Danish National Symphony Orchestra, and the Rotterdam Philharmonic Orchestra. Its world premiere was given by the pianist Alexandre Tharaud and the Westdeutscher Rundfunk Sinfonie-Orchester under the direction of Ilan Volkov on January 29, 2016. The piece is dedicated to Alexandre Tharaud.

== Composition ==
=== Background ===
Abrahamsen, who was born with cerebral palsy, has the use of only two fingers in his right hand, limiting his ability as a performer. In the score program notes for Left, alone, Abrahamsen wrote, "I was born with a right hand that is not fully functional, and though it never prevented me from loving playing the piano as well as I could with this physical limitation, it has obviously given me an alternative focus on the whole piano literature and has given me a close relationship with the works written for the left hand by Ravel and others. This repertoire has been with me since my youth."

The composer's first publicly performed work October was written for piano left-hand and horn (Abrahamsen's principal instrument and the only instrument that can be played with the left hand only). Abrahamsen performed the work himself in the autumn of 1969 and the idea of composing a large-scale work for piano left-hand had remained with him since.

Composed between 2014 and 2015, Abrahamsen said of Left, alone, "This new work is not written for a pianist with only one hand, but rather by a composer who can only play with the left hand." He added, "The title Left, alone contains all kinds of references, not only to the obvious fact that the left hand is playing alone."

=== Structure ===
The concerto has a duration of roughly 18 minutes and is cast in two parts divided into six smaller movements:

Part I

1. Very fast
2. Slowly walking
3. Presto fluente (like a gentle rain, light and bubbly)

Part II

4. Slowly
5. Prestissimo tempestuoso
6. In a tempo from another time – In a time of slow motion – Suddenly in flying time, "Fairy Tale Time"

=== Instrumentation ===
The work is scored for solo piano and an orchestra consisting of two flutes (both doubling piccolo), two oboes, two clarinets (1st doubling E-flat clarinet; 2nd doubling bass clarinet), two bassoons (2nd doubling contrabassoon), three horns, two trumpets, two trombones, bass tuba, timpani, two percussionists, harp, piano (doubling celesta), and strings.

== Reception ==
Left, alone has been praised by music critics. Rebecca Franks of The Times described it as "weightless and otherworldly, as stark, soft, radiant and magical as fresh snow." She added, "Even its composer, who took his bows after the flawless UK premiere with the City of Birmingham Symphony Orchestra, the soloist Alexandre Tharaud and the conductor Ilan Volkov, had the air of a magician with access to unimagined realms." Richard Bratby of The Arts Desk wrote:

Left, alone, Hans Abrahamsen's new piano concerto for the left hand, swirls out of the darkness to a jagged motor rhythm. Piano and orchestra clash and interlock; you're reminded of Prokofiev and Ravel. Then something happens. A piano plays, but the soloist is motionless. It's been there all the time, of course – an orchestral piano, up on the percussion risers. But now it's turned threatening: upstaging the soloist with its full two-handed range and stealing his musical voice, his very identity. And although it doesn't really intervene again until the last movement, you're continually aware of its sinister gloss black presence crouching there in the background – a quiet doppelganger, waiting to make its move. The concerto becomes a dark fairy tale.

Bratby continued:

Am I going too far? To be fair, Abrahamsen (...) actually describes the last of the concerto's six short movements as 'in flying time, Fairy Tale Time', and, himself unable to play the piano with his right hand, clearly identifies with his soloist. For this UK premiere that was the work's dedicatee, Alexandre Tharaud, bringing a miraculous range of tone and expression to a score which at times has him playing no more than a single note suspended in silence, or picking his way between a pair of claves. It's rare to hear a new work in which every note has been so carefully chosen and so perfectly placed.

== See also ==
- List of works for piano left-hand and orchestra
