= Let Me Tell You =

Let me tell you may refer to:

- Let me tell you, a novella by Paul Griffiths (writer)
- Let Me Tell You, a posthumous collection of work by Shirley Jackson, published by Random House in 2015
- Let me tell you (Abrahamsen), a composition for soprano and symphony orchestra by Hans Abrahamsen
- "Let Me Tell You", song by Julian Lennon from The Secret Value of Daydreaming
- "Let Me Tell You", song by Yeonjun featuring Daniela from No Labels: Part 01
