= Jermář =

Jermář or Jermar is a surname. Notable people with the surname include:

- Alesh Jermar, Czech-American post modernist classical composer
- Jan Jermář (born 2000), Czech tennis player
- Jaromír Jermář (born 1956), Czech historian & politician
