= Horn Concerto (Abrahamsen) =

2019 composition by Hans Abrahamsen

Hans Abrahamsen's Concerto for Horn and Orchestra was composed between 2018 and 2019 on a commission from the Stiftung Berliner Philharmoniker and co-commissions from the NHK Symphony Orchestra, the NTR Zaterdag Matinee (Radio 4's concert series at the Concertgebouw, Amsterdam), the Seattle Symphony, and the Auckland Philharmonia Orchestra. The world premiere was given by the Berlin Philharmonic and their principal horn player Stefan Dohr (to whom the piece is dedicated) conducted by Paavo Järvi at the Berliner Philharmonie on 29 January 2020.

== Composition ==
The concerto has a duration of about 18 minutes and is cast in three numbered movements.

=== Instrumentation ===
The work is scored for solo horn and an orchestra consisting of three flutes (3rd doubling piccolo 1 and alto flute; 2nd doubling piccolo 2), two oboes, Cor anglais, two clarinets (2nd doubling E-flat clarinet), two bassoons, two additional horns, two trumpets, two trombones, bass trombone, timpani (doubling bass drum), three percussionists, harp, celesta, and strings.

== Reception ==
The music journalist Jari Kallio described the concerto as "luminous" and "a riveting score," adding that "the Abrahamsen concerto will dwell long in memory." Michael Zarathus-Cook of smART Magazine described the solo part "as a virtuoso cosplaying as an amateur with a penchant for improvisation — in a good way." He continued, "At least that's what it seems Abrahamsen intended with this concerto. Nothing behaves as expected, not the structure of the movements (slow-fast-slow) nor the instruments: every time the piccolo and celesta chimed in, you'd think someone's early-2000's ringtone was going off."
