= Piano Concerto No. 2 (Liszt) =

1857 musical work

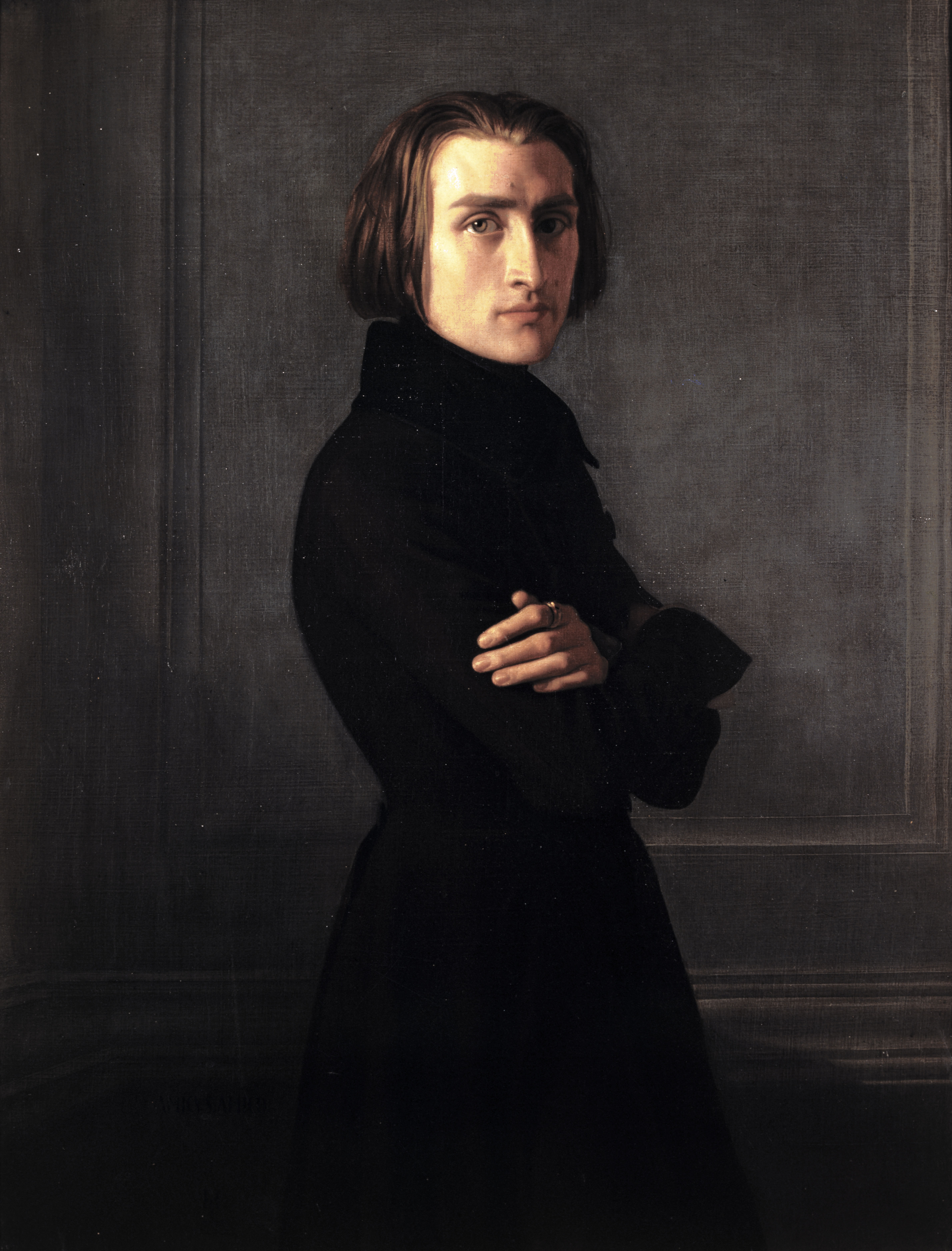
Portrait of Franz Liszt by Henri Lehmann, 1839

Franz Liszt wrote drafts for his Piano Concerto No. 2 in A major, S.125, during his virtuoso period, in 1839 to 1840. He then put away the manuscript for a decade. When he returned to the concerto, he revised and scrutinized it repeatedly. The fourth and final period of revision ended in 1861. Liszt dedicated the work to his student Hans von Bronsart, who gave the first performance, with Liszt conducting, in Weimar on January 7, 1857.

A typical performance of this concerto lasts about 25 minutes.

== Instrumentation ==
The concerto is scored for solo piano, three flutes (one doubling piccolo), two oboes, two clarinets in A, two bassoons, two horns in E, two trumpets in E, three trombones (two tenor, one bass), tuba, timpani in D and A, cymbals and strings.

== Form ==
This concerto is one single, long movement, divided into six sections that are connected by transformations of several themes:

- Adagio sostenuto assai
  The key musical idea of this concerto is first heard in the first clarinet, accompanied by no more than four other woodwinds: a sequence of two chords—an A major chord with a C♯ on top, then a dominant seventh on F♮. One note connects the two chords—an A.

- Allegro agitato assai
  This is technically the scherzo of the piece. It starts in B♭ minor and ends in C♯ minor.
- Allegro moderato
  The opening theme is played by solo cello while accompanied by the piano, showing the influence of Italian bel canto on Liszt's work.
- Allegro deciso
- Marziale un poco meno allegro
  Yet another transformation of the gentle opening theme, this section has also nearly always been attacked as vulgar and a betrayal of both the initial character of this theme and the concerto on the whole. American musicologist Robert Winter disagreed. He called the march "a masterstroke that demonstrates the full emotional range of thematic transformation." The march contains the force and weight needed to reestablish the home key of A major, from which the music has been moving quite far since the concerto opened.
- Allegro animato

== Overview ==
The second concerto, while less virtuosic than the First Piano Concerto, shows far more originality in form. In this respect it reveals a closer link to Liszt's better known symphonic poems in both style and structure. Also, while the final version of the First Concerto could be considered a soloist's showpiece, the Second shows Liszt attempting to confirm his compositional talent while distancing himself from his virtuoso performance origins. Liszt is less generous with technical devices for the soloist such as scales in octaves and contrary motion; instead of an overbearing virtuoso, the pianist often becomes an accompanist to woodwinds and strings. The soloist does not dominate the thematic material—in fact, after the opening, the pianist never has the theme in its original form. Instead their role is to create, or at least seem to create, inventive variations that lead the listener through a series of thematic transformations. The various pauses and silences are not intended breaks in the musical flow but rather serve as transitions in the musical discourse. "Organic unity" lends structure to the entire work.

=== Concerto symphonique ===
Liszt called this work Concerto symphonique while in manuscript. This title was borrowed from the Concertos symphoniques of Henry Litolff. Liszt liked not only Litolff's title but also the idea for which it stood. This concept was one of thematic metamorphosis — drawing together highly diverse themes from a single melodic source. This was a concept of which Liszt was already familiar from his study of Franz Schubert's Wanderer Fantasy. Beethoven had also used such a device in his Ninth Symphony, transforming the "Ode to Joy" theme during the final movement. With Liszt, however, thematic transformation would become a compositional device to which he would turn time and again—in the symphonic poems, the Faust and Dante Symphonies, and the B minor Piano Sonata.

This use of thematic transformation likewise changed Liszt's attitude toward compositional form. Compared to his contemporaries, who still used sonata form more or less conventionally, Liszt departed from the form at times radically. Themes are shuffled into new and unexpected sequences, with their various metamorphoses showcasing kaleidoscopic contrasts.

Recapitulations became foreshortened. Codas assume developmental proportions. Three- and four-movement structures are rolled into one. Liszt's justification, as he phrased it, was, "New wine demands new bottles."

=== An extreme level ===
With his Second Piano Concerto, Liszt took the practice of creating a large-scale compositional structure from metamorphosis alone to an extreme level. Its opening lyrical melody becomes the march-theme of the finale. That theme, in turn, morphs into an impassioned theme near the end of the concerto. The theme which begins the scherzo reappears at that sections end disguised as a totally different melody in another key. This last transformation is so complete that it is easy to not recognize the connection. Key, mode, time signature, pace and tonal color have all been transformed. For Liszt to so radically alter the music's notation while remaining true to the essential idea behind it shows a tremendous amount of ingenuity on his part.

The scoring, material and layout of the Second Piano Concerto also suggest the influence of Weber's Konzertstück in F minor for piano and orchestra. Liszt was highly familiar with this work. He had played it often in his touring days, beginning in 1833. He had also made an arrangement of the piece for piano solo as well as an amended version of the solo part (which he never played himself in performance). His knowledge of the structure of this single-movement concerto was of as great an importance to his musical development as his study of Schubert's Wanderer Fantasy.

Like the First Piano Concerto, the compositional structure unfolds continually as the work progresses. With the First Piano Concerto, this structure assumes a multi-movement format fairly clearly. This does not happen in the Second Piano Concerto. Neither does it conform to a single long movement based on sonata first-movement form in the way that the B minor Piano Sonata does. Some have argued that Liszt may have been aiming for a structural intermediate between these two poles. This, they explain, is why the Second Piano Concerto can seem ambiguous structurally.

This potential sense of ambiguity becomes twofold. First, as the music unfolds, it becomes a work of many and distinct episodes following one another rapidly. This can lead to a sense of structural fragmentation, with no organic unity apparent. Second, the harmonic range becomes wider ranging. The music stays in one key just long enough to modulate to another key. In his essay "Liszt Misunderstood," Alfred Brendel comments on this technique:

There is something fragmentary about Liszt's work; its musical argument, perhaps by its nature, is often not brought to a conclusion. But is the fragment not the purest, the most legitimate form of Romanticism? When Utopia becomes the primary goal, when the attempt is made to contain the illimitable, then form will have to remain "open" in order that the illimitable may enter. It is the business of the interpreter to show us how a general pause may connect rather than separate two paragraphs, how a transition may mysteriously transform the musical argument. This is a magical art. By some process incomprehensible to the intellect, organic unity becomes established, the "open form" reaches its conclusions in the infinite. Anyone who does not know the allure of the fragmentary will remain a stranger to much of Liszt's music, and perhaps to Romanticism in general.

=== Revision ===
As with the First Piano Concerto, Liszt revised the piano part considerably. In his revisions, Liszt achieved as great or greater effect than his initial concept for many passages by using simpler means. One important feature was replacing passages in broken octaves with passages for alternating hands. Liszt performed similar simplifications with the Transcendental Etudes and Grandes études de Paganini.

== Performance history ==
Liszt was cautious about performances of the Second Piano Concerto. This stemmed mainly from his desire to protect his students from the undue wrath of critics. For instance, he wrote Johann von Herbeck, then director of the Vienna Philharmonic, "In case pianist Hans von Bülow should make his appearance at the Philharmonic concert he will, on my advice, not play my A-major Concerto (nor any other composition of mine) but just simply one of the Bach or Beethoven concertos. My close friends know perfectly well that it is not my desire to push myself into any concert programme whatever."

This cautiousness was not always a hard-and-fast rule. The then-17-year-old Karl Tausig played the work in Prague on March 11, 1858. Tausig repeated it in Weimar on August 8, 1860 to general acclaim. This was after the incident in that city over Peter Cornelius's The Barber of Baghdad and not long before Liszt would resign as music director there.

== See also ==
- Piano Concerto No. 1 (Liszt)
- Piano Concerto No. 3 (Liszt)

== Bibliography ==
- Collet, Robert, ed. Alan Walker, Franz Liszt: The Man and His Music (London: Barrie & Jenkins, 1976, 1970). ISBN 0-214-20345-X.
  Collet offers a detailed analysis of this and several other works by Liszt for piano and orchestra.
- ed. Hamilton, Kenneth, The Cambridge Companion to Liszt (Cambridge and New York: Cambridge University Press, 2005). ISBN 0-521-64462-3 (paperback).
  - Celenza, Anna, "Liszt's piano concerti"
- Walker, Alan, Franz Liszt: Volume Two, The Weimar Years, 1848-1861 (New York: Alfred A Knopf, 1989). ISBN 0-394-52540-X.
  Traces the history of the work and the development of themes through it, though not in the same detail as Collet.
- Steinberg, Michael, The Concerto (New York and Oxford: Oxford University Press, 1998). ISBN 0-19-510330-0.
