= Hans Abrahamsen =

Danish composer (born 1952)

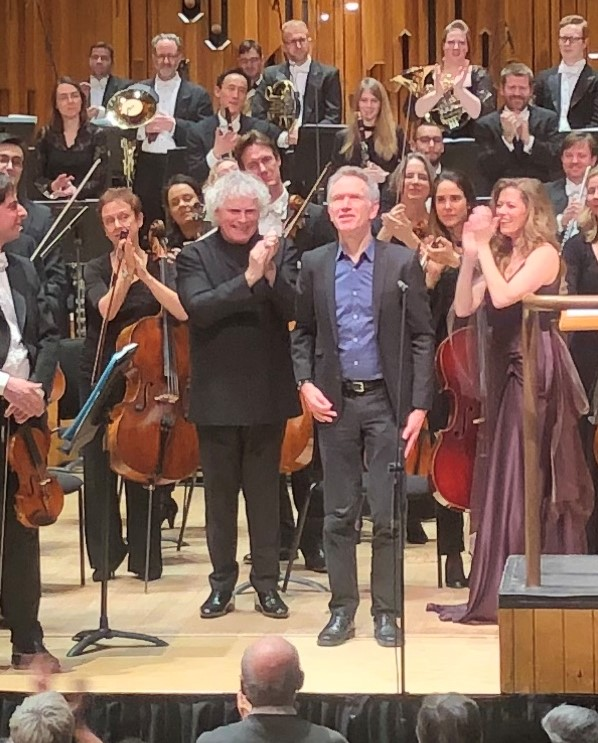
Abrahamsen taking a bow with Simon Rattle and Barbara Hannigan after a performance of Let me tell you by the London Symphony Orchestra in 2019

Hans Abrahamsen (born 23 December 1952) is a Danish composer born in Kongens Lyngby near Copenhagen. His Let me tell you (2013), a song cycle for soprano and orchestra, was ranked by music critics at The Guardian as the finest work of the 21st-century. His opera The Snow Queen was commissioned and premiered by the Royal Danish Theatre in 2019.

In 2019, Abrahamsen became Knussen Professor of Composition at the Royal Academy of Music.

== Biography ==
=== Early life ===
His interest in composition and piano began after hearing his father playing piano. His first attempts at "little melodies" were designed to be played with the only two fingers on his right hand that were capable of playing the instrument. After realizing that he would not be able to progress, he shifted his focus to the French horn.

From 1969 to 1971, he studied horn, music theory, and music history at the Royal Danish Academy of Music in Copenhagen. While at the conservatory, his music was inspired by his mentors Per Nørgård and Pelle Gudmundsen-Holmgreen. In the 1980s, he continued his studies attending seminars with György Ligeti. In the 1970s and 1980s he taught music privately in Copenhagen. Andy Pape was one of his music composition students.

=== Early career ===
Abrahamsen is considered to have been part of a trend called the "New Simplicity", which arose in the mid-1960s as a reaction against the complexity and perceived aridity of the Central European avant-garde, particularly the circle around the Darmstadt School. Abrahamsen's first works conformed to the tenets of this movement. For Abrahamsen, this meant adopting an almost naive simplicity of expression, as in his orchestral piece Skum ("Foam", 1970).

Around this time, he was also involved with a group called the Gruppen for Alternativ Musik, which was designed to allow musicians to "perform new music in alternative forms," and "to develop socially and politically committed music." These ideals can be seen in his Symphony in C which was originally titled Anti-EEC Sats (Anti-EEC Movement). The title was changed "after the composer came to the realization that ' music cannot be against.'" His style soon altered and developed into a personal dialogue with Romanticism which can be seen in his orchestral work Nacht und Trompeten. In 1982, he found early success when this piece was performed by the Berlin Philharmonic. The conductor of that performance, notable composer Hans Werner Henze, soon became a champion of Abrahamsen's music.

=== Hiatus ===
From 1990 to 1998, Abrahamsen completed only one work, a short song. According to the composer, “[he] couldn't find the way to make what [he] wanted.” The prevailing attitudes about complexity in music caused him to be "paralyzed by the white paper." Coming out of his hiatus, he began working on new arrangements of Johann Sebastian Bach. The orchestrations of these arrangements included many nods to minimalist composers foreshadowing aesthetic changes in Abrahamsen's music.

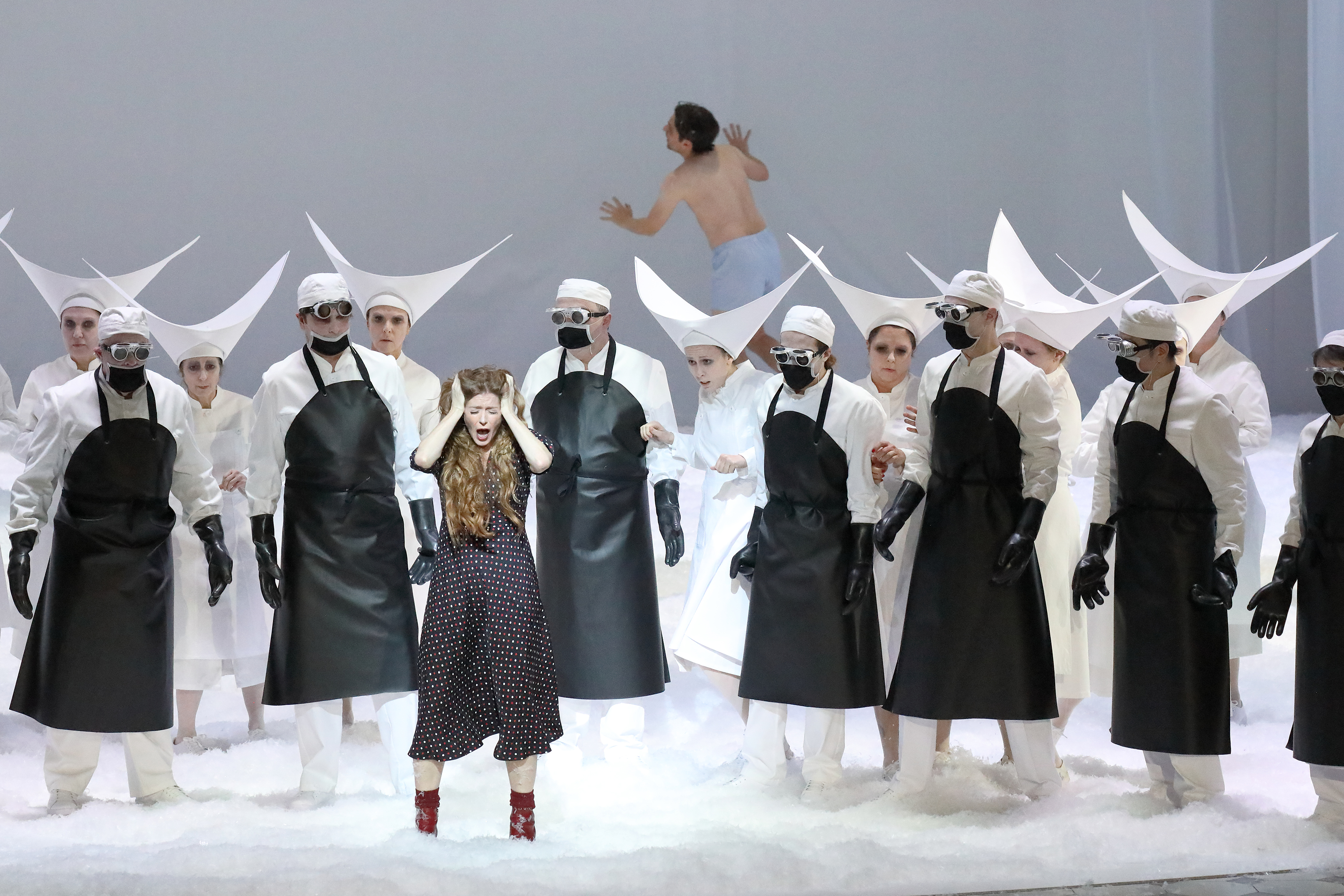
Abrahamsen's first opera, The Snow Queen, at the Bavarian State Opera (Gerda: Barbara Hannigan) staged by Andreas Kriegenburg

=== Return to music ===
After his return to composition, his music was radically changed. It combined his early artistic attitudes with newer artistic goals with a modernist stringency and economy into a larger individual musical universe.

Notable works since his return to composition include a piano concerto written for his wife Anne-Marie Abildskov, and the extended chamber work Schnee ("Snow"), where the paring-down of material appears to reach a new extreme. Schnee has also received attention for its construction from both arch-shaped and straight-line processes that unfold over the work's duration and for innovative details such as its inline, composed retuning intervals.

Abrahamsen's let me tell you, a song cycle for soprano and orchestra based on the novella of the same name by Paul Griffiths, was premiered on 20 December 2013 by the Berlin Philharmonic, with soprano soloist Barbara Hannigan (to whom the work is dedicated), conducted by Andris Nelsons. Franz Welser-Möst led the Cleveland Orchestra in the U.S. premiere in January 2016. Abrahamsen won the $100,000 2016 Grawemeyer Award for this work.

The City of Birmingham Symphony Orchestra gave the British premiere of the song cycle in 2014. The same year CBSO co-commissioned from Abrahamsen a concerto for piano left hand. Left, alone received its world premiere in Cologne in January 2016, performed by pianist Alexandre Tharaud, for whom the concerto was composed. Four months later, Tharaud gave the British premiere for the CBSO, conducted by Ilan Volkov. Abrahamsen has written that being "born with a right hand that is not fully functional" has given him "a close relationship with the works written for the left hand by Ravel and others."

His first opera Snedronningen (The Snow Queen) is a free adaptation of the fairy tale by Hans Christian Andersen. It was premiered at the Danish Opera House on 13 October 2019 and received its first performance in English (by Bayerische Staatsoper) at the National Theater in Munich on 21 December 2019.

He is a foreign member of the Royal Swedish Academy of Music. In 2019, Abrahamsen became Knussen Professor of Composition at the Royal Academy of Music.

Productions of his opera Snedronningen (The Snow Queen) continued internationally, including a staging by the Bavarian State Opera. The recording of that production won the 2022 Gramophone Contemporary Award. The opera brought Abrahamsen the H. C. Andersen Award in 2023, presented at a ceremony in Odense.

A central work of this period is Vers le silence, composed between 2020 and 2021 during COVID-19 lockdown and jointly commissioned by the Cleveland Orchestra, the Bavarian Radio Symphony Orchestra, the NTR ZaterdagMatinee, and the Royal Danish Orchestra. Alongside the horn concerto and the left-hand piano concerto Left, alone, it forms what the composer has described as a personal trilogy. Vers le silence went on to win the Prince Pierre of Monaco Foundation's Musical Composition Prize in 2024.

== Selected works ==
=== Opera ===
- The Snow Queen (2019)

=== Orchestra ===
- Vers le Silence (2021)
- Drei Märchenbilder aus der Schneekönigin (2018)
- Three Pieces for Orchestra (2017)
- Bamberger Tanz (2014)
- Ten Sinfonias (2010)
- Nacht und Trompeten (1981)
- Stratifications (1975)
- Symphony (1974)
- EEC Satz (1972)

=== Orchestra and soloist ===
- Concerto for Horn and Orchestra (2019) – for horn and orchestra
- Left, alone (2015) – for piano left hand and orchestra
- let me tell you (2013) – for soprano and orchestra
- Double Concerto (2011) – for violin, piano and orchestra
- Piano Concerto (1999) – for piano and orchestra

=== Large ensemble ===
- Schnee (2008) – for flute, oboe, clarinet, percussion, two pianos, violin, viola and cello
- Lied in Fall (1987) – for cello and 13 instruments

=== Chamber music ===
- String Quartet No. 4 (2012) – for string quartet
- String Quartet No. 3 (2008) – for string quartet
- Ten Studies (1998) – for piano solo
- Hymne (1990) – for cello or viola solo
- Six Pieces (1984) – for violin, horn, and piano
- String Quartet No. 2 (1981) – for string quartet
- Walden (1978, 1995) – for wind quintet
- Winternacht (1978) – for flute, clarinet, horn, cornet, violin, cello and piano
- Denmark Songs (1976) – for soprano, viola, flute, clarinet, percussion, and piano
- 10 Preludes - String Quartet No. 1 (1973) – for string quartet
- Flowersongs (1973) – for 3 flutes
  - 2012 version for flute, oboe, and clarinet
- Universe Birds (1973) – for 10 sopranos
- Round and in between (1971) – for brass quintet
