= Vers le Silence =

Musical composition by Hans Abrahamsen

Vers le Silence is an orchestral composition by the Danish composer Hans Abrahamsen. Abrahamsen wrote Vers le Silence (Toward the Silence) between 2020 and 2021 while in lockdown during the COVID-19 pandemic. It is cast in four numbered movements and lasts about 28 minutes.

The work was commissioned by the Cleveland Orchestra, the Bavarian Radio Symphony Orchestra, the NTR ZaterdagMatinee, and the Royal Danish Orchestra. Its world premiere was performed by the Cleveland Orchestra conducted by Franz Welser-Möst at Severance Hall, Cleveland, on 6 January 2022. The piece is dedicated to Abrahamsen's friend and fellow composer George Benjamin.

== Instrumentation ==
The work is written for a large orchestra consisting of 2 piccolos (2nd doubling 3rd flute), 2 flutes, 3 oboes, cor anglais, 2 clarinets in B♭ (2nd doubling clarinet in A), 2 basset horns (1st doubling clarinet in A, 2nd doubling bass clarinet), 3 bassoons (3rd doubling contrabassoon), contrabassoon, 4 horns, 2 trumpets in B♭, 2 cornets (both doubling trumpet), 3 trombones, tuba, timpani, five percussionists, 2 harps, piano, celesta, and strings.

== Reception ==
Reviewing the world premiere, Zachary Lewis of praised Vers le Silence for "coming on strong with cacophonous, often shrill music and slowly ebbing away in a dazzling variety of textures and colors, all of them sparse and serene." He added, "The composer's gifts as an orchestrator were on non-stop display in diaphanous, kaleidoscopic moments for harps, piano, clarinets, and bass drum, among many others, and string passages ranging from volcanic to iced-over." Reviewing a performance at the 2024 Lucerne Festival, Richard Morrison of The Times similarly described the piece as "a Covid-era work in which the orchestra tries, over and over, to play brassy, exuberant music, only to implode each time into a sepulchral hush that finally, perhaps, suggests some glimmer of spiritual awakening."
