= Concerto for Two Pianos and Orchestra =

Concerto for Two Pianos and Orchestra may refer to:

== In music ==
- Concerto for Two Pianos and Orchestra (Berio), by Luciano Berio
- Concerto for Two Pianos and Orchestra, Op. 30, by Lennox Berkeley
- Concerto for Two Pianos and Orchestra (Bruch), by Max Bruch
- Concerto for Two Pianos and Orchestra in E major (Mendelssohn), by Felix Mendelssohn
- Concerto for Two Pianos and Orchestra in A-flat major (Mendelssohn), by Felix Mendelssohn
- Piano Concerto No. 10 (Mozart), by Wolfgang Amadeus Mozart
- Concerto for Two Pianos and Orchestra (Poulenc), by Francis Poulenc
- Concerto for Two Pianos and Orchestra, by Dana Suesse
- Concerto for Two Pianos and Orchestra (Vaughan Williams), by Ralph Vaughan Williams

== See also ==
- Concerto for Two Pianos, Percussion and Orchestra, by Béla Bartók
- Concerto for Two Pianos (Stravinsky), by Igor Stravinsky
