= Concerto for Two Pianos and Orchestra (Berio) =

Orchestral work by Luciano Berio

- by Luciano Berio
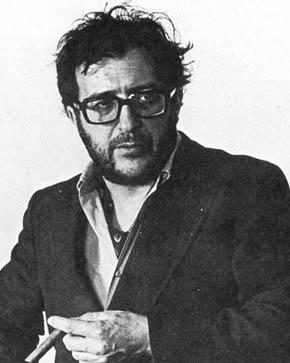
- Composed: 1972/73
- Dedication: Janice and Norman Rosenthal
- Performed: 15 March 1973

The Concerto for Two Pianos and Orchestra was composed by Luciano Berio between 1972 and 1973 on a commission from the New York Philharmonic. Its world premiere was given by the pianists Bruno Canino and Antonio Ballista and the New York Philharmonic conducted by Pierre Boulez at Philharmonic Hall, New York City, on 15 March 1973. The piece is dedicated to Janice and Norman Rosenthal. The concerto has a duration of roughly 25 minutes and is cast in a single continuous movement.

== Instrumentation ==
The work is scored for two solo pianos and a large orchestra comprising two flutes, piccolo, two oboes, Cor anglais, two clarinets, piccolo clarinet, bass clarinet, alto saxophone, tenor saxophone, three bassoons, contrabassoon, three horns, three trumpets, three trombones, tuba, electric organ, an additional piano, marimba, two percussionists, and strings.

== Reception ==
Reviewing the world premiere, Harold C. Schonberg of The New York Times was critical of the piece, writing, "Mr. Berio's Two‐Piano Concerto has to live or die as music, as something that communicates. On that basis it does not have much chance of survival." He added, "As the concerto continued, it became very dense, very complicated and very reminiscent of Stockhausen, Stravinsky and others. Mr. Berio really does not have much in the way of an original statement to offer."
