= Let me tell you (Abrahamsen) =

Song cycle by Hans Abrahamsen

- by Hans Abrahamsen
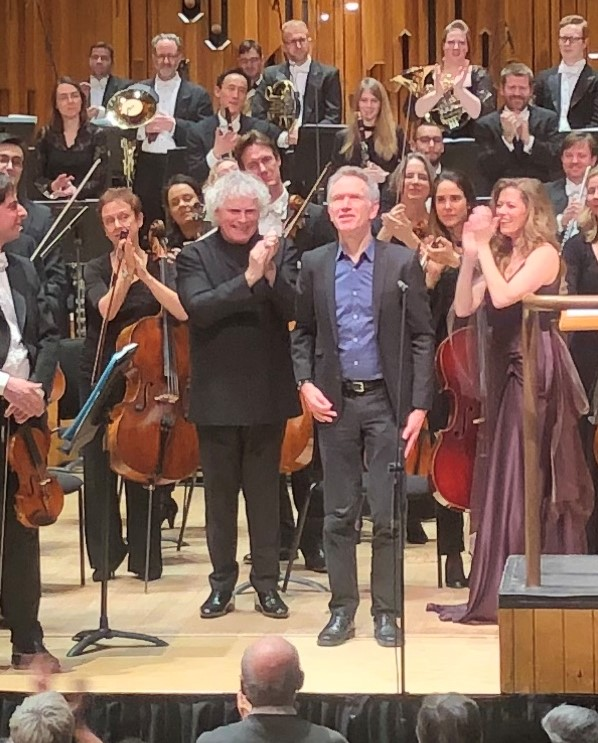
- Hans Abrahamsen taking a bow with Simon Rattle and Barbara Hannigan after a performance of Let me tell you by the London Symphony Orchestra in January 2019
- Form: song cycle
- Commissioned by: Berlin Philharmonic and the Danish Arts Foundation
- Text: Paul Griffiths
- Based on: let me tell you by Paul Griffiths
- Performed: 20 December 2013:
- Published: 2013: Copenhagen by Edition Wilhelm Hansen

Let me tell you is a song cycle for soprano and orchestra by the Danish composer Hans Abrahamsen. The work was commissioned by the Berlin Philharmonic with support from the Danish Arts Foundation. It is based on the eponymous 2008 novel let me tell you by the writer Paul Griffiths. Its world premiere was given by the soprano Barbara Hannigan and the Berlin Philharmonic under the direction of Andris Nelsons on December 20, 2013.

== Composition ==
=== Background ===
Let me tell you was Abrahamsen's second commission for the Berlin Philharmonic, following his 1981 orchestral composition Nacht und Trompeten. It was written at the request of the soprano Barbara Hannigan, to whom the work is also dedicated. As in Griffiths's novel, the narrative follows the character Ophelia from Shakespeare's Hamlet as she tells her tragic story from her own perspective. Both the novel and the text of the song cycle are restricted to the 480 words used by Ophelia in the play. The piece was composed between 2012 and 2013.

=== Structure ===
Let me tell you has a duration of approximately 30 minutes and is composed in three parts comprising a total of seven songs:

Part I:

1. Let me tell you how it was
2. O but memory is not one but many
3. There was a time, I remember

Part II:

4. Let me tell you how it is
5. Now I do not mind

Part III:

6. I know you are there
7. I will go out now

Robert Kirzinger, in his programme notes to performance by Barbara Hannigan with the Boston Symphony Orchestra, describes the three parts as being focused on time and memory (Part I), love (Part II) and Part III with what Abrahamsen calls a snow landscape – an overarching mental state of snow, as in Schubert’s Winterreise.

=== Instrumentation ===
The work is scored for soprano solo and an orchestra consisting of the following instruments.

Woodwinds

3 flutes (1st doubling alto flute and piccolo 3; 2nd doubling piccolo 2; 3rd doubling piccolo 1)
2 oboes
1 cor anglais
2 clarinets in B♭ and A
1 bass clarinet (doubling E♭ clarinet)
2 bassoons
1 contrabassoon

Brass
4 horns
2 trumpets in C
2 tenor trombones
1 bass trombone

Percussion

timpani
xylophone, marimba, glockenspiel, vibraphone with bow, tubular bells, bass drum, tam-tam (large), whip, wood block (high), paper, 2 Reibestock (medium) [3 players]
celesta

Strings
harp

violins I
violins II
violas
cellos
double basses

== Reception ==
=== Critical response ===
Let me tell you has been highly praised by music critics. Andrew Clements of The Guardian called the piece "ravishingly and astonishingly beautiful" and wrote:

Abrahamsen's vocal writing makes much use of stile concitato, the repeated-note emphases that hark back to Monteverdi, and also exploits Hannigan's ability to rise effortlessly to the limits of the soprano range. And he surrounds the voice with glistening, deliquescent textures that can seem almost weightless until a growling line in the bass brings them fluttering to earth. The music sometimes seems as much an exercise in memory as the text, touching on familiar, tonal shapes and harmonies without being explicit and embracing microtones in the final section.

He concluded, "Hannigan soared above it all with consummate grace and ease, while Nelsons and the orchestra made every corner of the score shine. It's a very special piece indeed."

Reviewing the New York City premiere, Anthony Tommasini of The New York Times called it "eerily alluring" and observed, "It's not often that a performance of a challenging new piece receives the kind of ovation typically awarded star virtuosi. But that's what happened on Sunday night at Carnegie Hall when the conductor Franz Welser-Möst led the Cleveland Orchestra in the New York premiere of the Danish composer Hans Abrahamsen's let me tell you." Barbara Jepson of The Wall Street Journal similarly remarked, "The abstract musical idiom is mildly dissonant with occasional lyrical moments. By holding back any sustained sense of tonality until the final song, Mr. Abrahamsen delivers a powerfully affecting denouement."

Reviewing a recording of the piece, Neil Fisher of Gramophone described it as "a richly theatrical journey" and wrote, "The spare yet pregnant lines of text meet Abrahamsen's finely spun textures and each word feels felt and weighed in music. Possibly you don't even need to know that Barbara Hannigan is singing Ophelia's words any more, yet her vehemence and passion suggest she thinks justice is finally being done to a woman who never did get much chance to tell her side of the story." Kate Molleson of The Guardian called it "one of the most spellbindingly beautiful vocal-orchestral works of recent years." She added, "Abrahamsen's orchestral writing is typically spare and wintry – a magical panoply of spangly microtonal sounds come from Andris Nelsons and the Bavarian Radio Symphony Orchestra, but it's also darker, more lush and more bristling than his most austere works."

In a 2019 poll of seven critics by The Guardian, the piece was ranked the greatest classical composition of the 21st century.

=== Awards ===
Let me tell you won the 2016 Grawemeyer Award for music. The director of the award Marc Satterwhite said of the piece, "The vocal lines exquisitely mirror Griffiths' fragile texts of the doomed Ophelia. The orchestra is a partner rather than mere accompanist and the composer draws a huge array of colors from the orchestra, delicate and shimmering more often than not, but occasionally in fuller force." Abrahamsen recalled his reaction in an interview with Tom Huizenga of NPR, saying, "I remember the first time I heard about the award and heard that Lutosławski and Ligeti and others who won. I knew it was, and still is, a very prestigious prize. So when I heard that I had received it, I became very honored and very happy."

== Recording ==
A recording of let me tell you, performed by Hannigan and the Bavarian Radio Symphony Orchestra under Andris Nelsons, was released through Winter & Winter Records on January 8, 2016.
