= Film Symphony Orchestra =

Czech classical orchestra

The Film Symphony Orchestra (FISYO) (Czech: Filmový symfonický orchestr) is a Czech classical orchestra, specialising in recording film music. It is also known under the name Czech Symphony Orchestra, which was used frequently in the 1990s whenever the orchestra performed on the international concert stage. It is not to be confused with the Spanish "Film Symphony Orchestra" (FSO).

The orchestra was founded in June 1943 as the in-house orchestra of the Barrandov Studios in Prague. It was subsequently nationalised by the Czechoslovak government, but government support was cancelled in 1989, and the orchestra shut down due to economic reasons. In 1991 a private company FISYO s.r.o. was founded by one of the orchestra's members in order to continue the ensemble's work.

To date, the orchestra has recorded music for over 5,000 Czech and international movies, in particular German, French, Belgian, Greek, Italian, Danish, Norwegian, Canadian, American and Japanese films. Notable film titles include Blue Velvet and The Bourne Identity, which earned the orchestra an Emmy Award.

Next to its recording activities the orchestra also performs live in concert, at venues such as the Théâtre du Châtelet in Paris, where it performed with chanson singer Veronique Sanson. Successful concerts have also included tours to England and the USA, where it performed Jan Klusák's film music from Erotikon, a 1929 Czech film directed by Gustav Machatý. Influential conductors include in particular František Belfín and Štěpán Koníček. Since 1991 the orchestra has been using the name Czech Symphony Orchestra for their international concert performances.

Another ensemble that broke away from the Film Symphony Orchestra after its government shutdown is known as the City of Prague Philharmonic Orchestra.
