= Capriccio (Janáček) =

Musical composition by Leoš Janáček

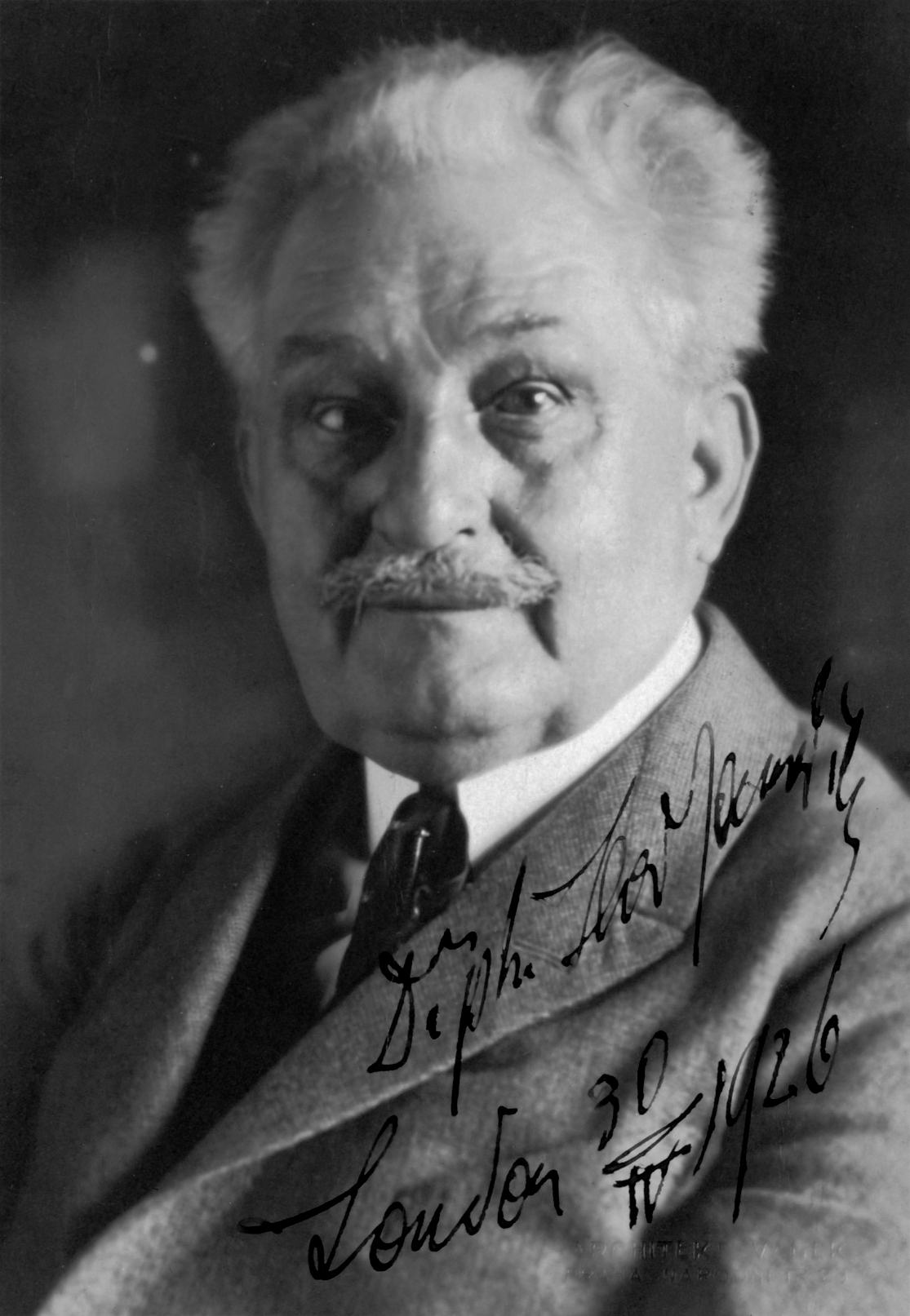
Leoš Janáček in 1926

The Capriccio for Piano Left-Hand and Chamber Ensemble (sometimes titled Defiance, in Czech: Vzdor) is a composition by the Czech composer Leoš Janáček. The work was written in the autumn of 1926 and is remarkable not just in the context of Janáček's output, but it also occupies an exceptional position in the literature written for piano played only by the left hand. The piece is scored for piano, flute, two trumpets, three trombones and tenor tuba.

== Background ==
The work was apparently inspired by the request of the pianist Otakar Hollmann, who had lost the use of his right hand during World War I. During their first meeting Janáček refused to write such a work, declaring: "But, my dear boy, why do you want to play with one hand? It's hard to dance when you have only one leg." Janáček later changed his decision and began composing a piano piece for left hand, but did not notify Hollman about the composition. Hollman contacted Janáček again after finding out about the existence of the work in the press. Janáček did not dedicate the work to him and did not give him the right to premiere the work, stating: "I cannot give any kind of rights to the first performance. Whoever manages to do it can play it." However, in May 1927 he sent the score to the pianist, and in the summer of the same year Hollmann started to study the new composition. The first private hearing of the work took place on February 6, 1928 at Janáček's apartment in Brno, to the composer's satisfaction. The preparations for the premiere of the Capriccio were led by the conductor Jaroslav Řídký. Janáček observed with humour that the trombonists of the renowned Czech Philharmonic were forced to practise their parts at home.

The premiere took place on March 2, 1928 in the Smetana Hall of the Municipal Cultural Center in Prague, with conductor Jaroslav Řídký, Hollmann as pianist and seven Czech Philharmonic members: Václav Máček (flute), Evžen Šerý and František Trnka (trumpets), Antonín Bok, Jaroslav Šimsa and Gustav Tyl (trombones) and with Antonín Koula (tenor tuba).

Janáček often called the piece "Vzdor" (Defiance) in his letters to Kamila Stösslová.

The first edition of the Capriccio was prepared by Jarmil Burghauser in 1953. Nowadays it is played regularly at concerts and on recordings.

== Structure ==
The composition consists of four movements:

1. Allegro
2. Adagio
3. Allegretto
4. Andante

The work shows typical traits of Janáček's mature creative period. All parts are composed in a fairly free form, with the first and last movement having outlines of the sonata form. The elements of structure are divided among all of the instruments and, unlike other works (as in the case of his Concertino) the piano does not always have a leading role. The composer made all the instruments parts equally important.

In the work very unusual demands are placed on the individual instruments, with the brass parts in particular containing difficult passages.
