= Piano Concerto No. 3 (Liszt) =

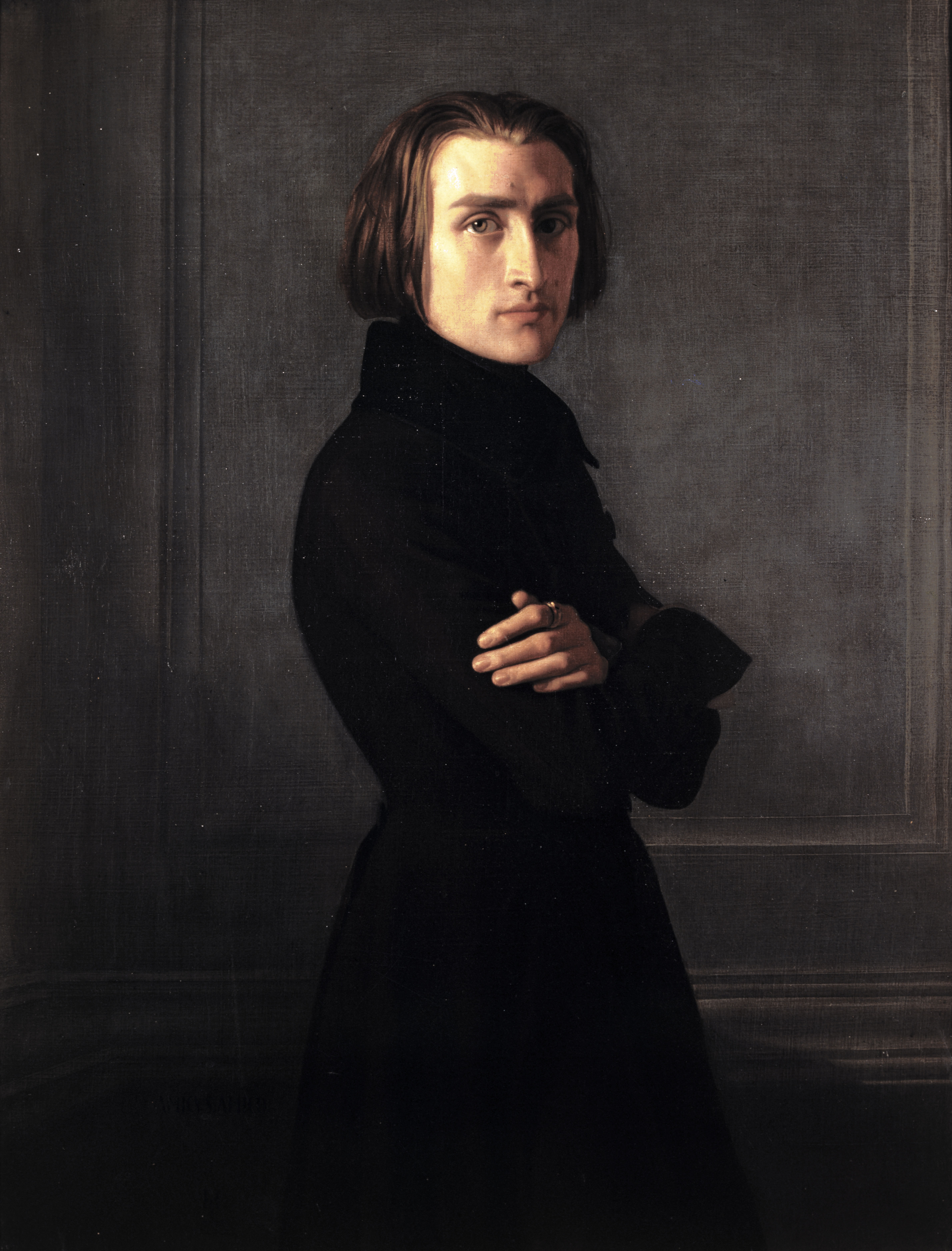
Portrait of Franz Liszt by Henri Lehmann, 1839

Franz Liszt's Piano Concerto No. 3 in E♭ major, Op. posth. (S.125a), was possibly composed in 1839. It is believed that this piece was composed before the first two concertos, but the dating is inconclusive as there are claims it was not finished until 1847. Like his second piano concerto, it is a one-movement piece.

== Rediscovery ==
It was virtually unknown until 1989. It was identified and assembled from multiple sources by Jay Rosenblatt, a doctoral candidate at the University of Chicago. Parts of the score were located in Weimar, Nuremberg and Leningrad, and, to the extent they were known at all, it had been assumed they were early drafts of Liszt's Piano Concerto No. 1, also in E♭ major. Liszt made no mention of this third concerto in his writings, so the existence of the piece was unknown to researchers.

When Liszt died, his housekeeper let his pupils go through the house and take away manuscripts as mementos. These were not always complete scores. The Nuremberg sheet came from Max Erdmannsdörfer, who came into contact with Liszt while he was kapellmeister at Sondershausen. In 1882 he became kapellmeister in Moscow. It is possible that he had the whole score and that part of it eventually found its way to the Leningrad library after his death.

== Performance history ==
The concerto was premiered by Janina Fialkowska on May 3, 1990, with the Chicago Symphony Orchestra, Kenneth Jean conducting.

It has not yet entered the standard repertoire, and remains little known, although there have been recordings by Janina Fialkowska, Jerome Lowenthal, Louis Lortie, Jenő Jandó, Leslie Howard, and Joshua Pierce.
