= Barbara Hannigan =

Canadian soprano and conductor (born 1971)

Barbara Hannigan CM
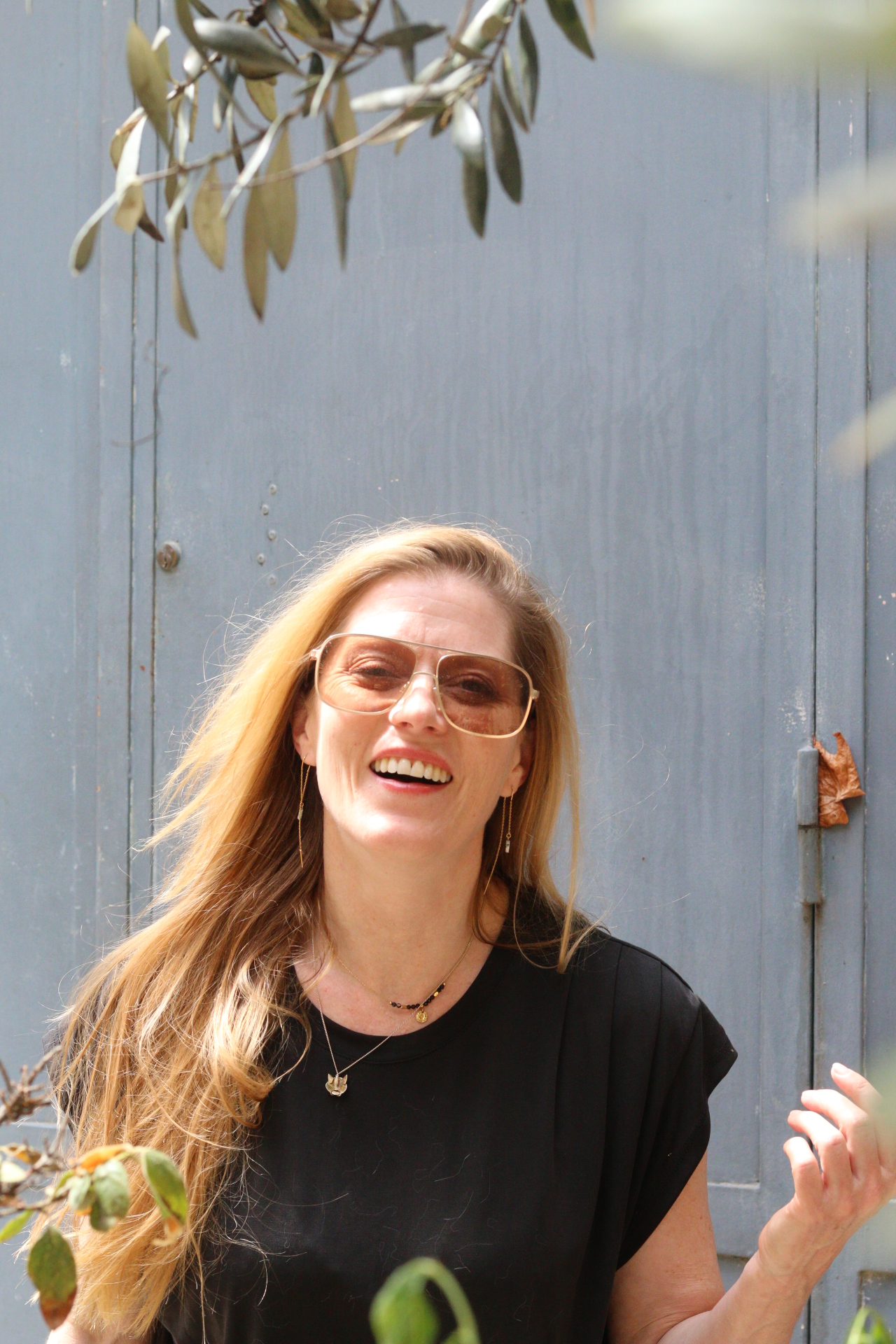
- Barbara Hannigan, 2024
- Born: 8 May 1971 (age 55); Halifax, Nova Scotia, Canada
- Occupations: Opera singer (soprano); Conductor
- Years active: 1988–present
- Website: barbarahannigan.com

Barbara Hannigan CM (born 8 May 1971) is a Canadian soprano and conductor, and is currently the Chief Conductor and Artistic Director of the Iceland Symphony Orchestra. She is particularly known for her performances of contemporary classical music, and in 2025, she received the Polar Music Prize.

== Early life and education ==
Hannigan is from Waverley, Nova Scotia. She moved to Toronto at the age of 17.

She graduated from the University of Toronto with a Bachelor of Music degree in 1993 and a Master of Music degree in 1998. She continued her studies at the Banff Centre for Arts and Creativity, the Steans Institute for Young Artists at the Ravinia Festival, and the Centre d'arts Orford. She also studied for one year at the Royal Conservatory of The Hague.

== Career ==
Hannigan is known for her performances of contemporary music. She sang her first world premiere at the age of 17. As of 2023, she has premiered approximately 85 contemporary compositions. These include Written on Skin by George Benjamin (2017); La plus forte by Gerald Barry (2007); let me tell you by Hans Abrahamsen; Split the Lark (2022) and Star Catcher (2022) by John Zorn; and Je ne suis pas une fable à conter (2023) by Golfam Khayam.

Barbara Hannigan dressed as Pippi Longstocking during a performance of Mysteries of the Macabre in Gothenburg Concert Hall on the 4:th of November 2026.

Hannigan is noted for her performances of György Ligeti's Mysteries of the Macabre (a concert version of a scene from his opera Le Grand Macabre); in 2011 she began to conduct the work in addition to singing the vocal part, sometimes wearing striking costumes. Her work in contemporary opera has included singing in the premieres of Louis Andriessen's Writing to Vermeer, Gerald Barry's The Bitter Tears of Petra von Kant and The Importance of Being Earnest, Jan van de Putte's Wet Snow, and Kris Defoort's House of the Sleeping Beauties. She has worked with choreographer Sasha Waltz on productions of Toshio Hosokawa's Matsukaze and Pascal Dusapin's Passion. Hannigan received critical acclaim for her performance in Alban Berg's Lulu, which included dancing en pointe. In 2014, Hannigan sang the role of Marie in Bernd Alois Zimmermann's opera Die Soldaten at the Bavarian State Opera. For her performance as Marie, she won the 2015 Der Faust award.

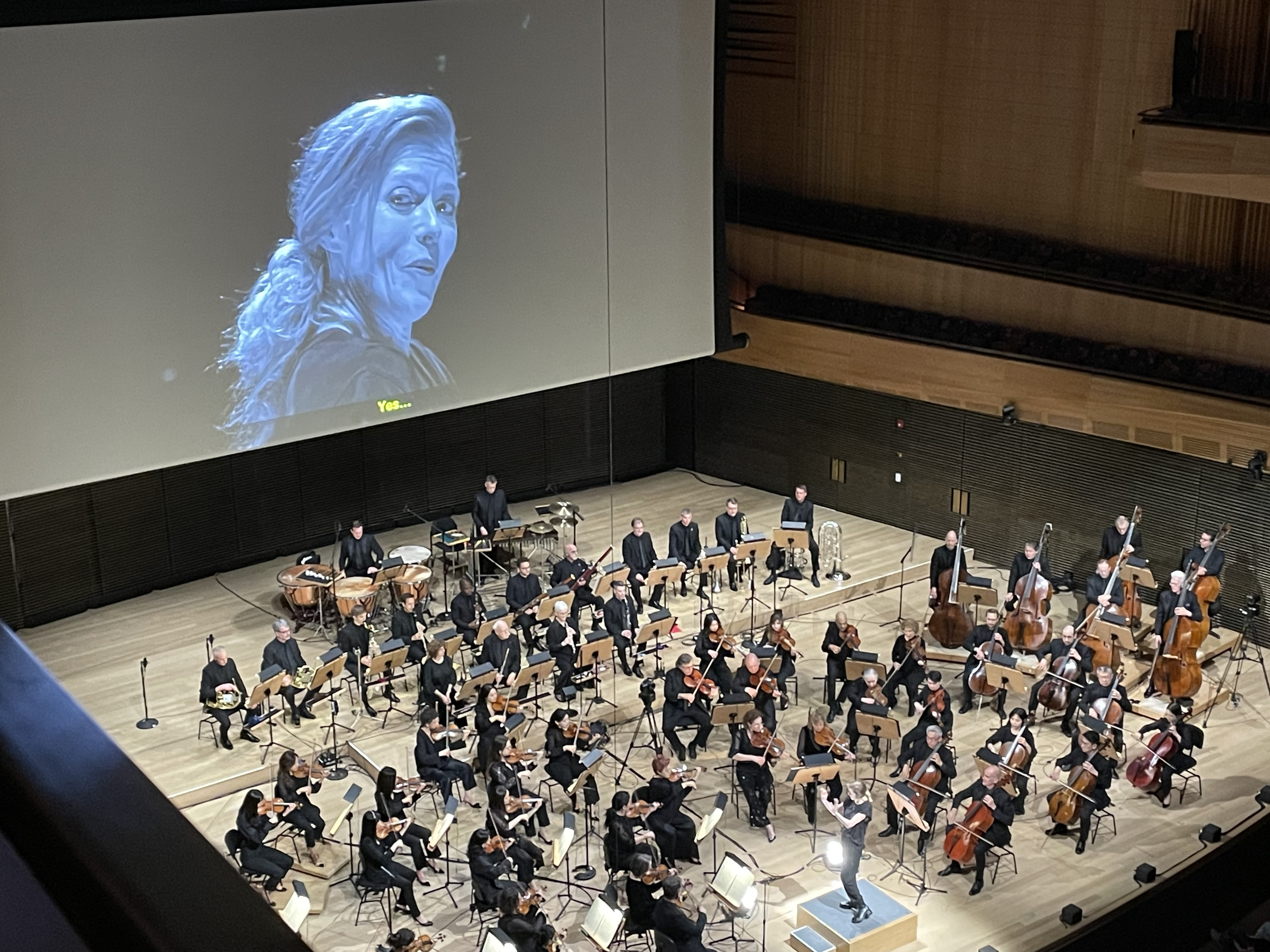
Hannigan conducting and performing La Voix humaine with the New York Philharmonic, April 24, 2026

Hannigan regularly performs in concert as both a soprano and conductor. She has worked with the Berlin Philharmonic, Munich Philharmonic, London Symphony Orchestra, Toronto Symphony Orchestra, Orchestre philharmonique de Radio France, Gothenburg Symphony Orchestra, Prague Philharmonic, Mahler Chamber Orchestra, Avanti! Chamber Orchestra, Accademia Nazionale di Santa Cecilia, Britten Sinfonia, Gulbenkian Orchestra, Cleveland Orchestra, Danish Radio Symphony Orchestra, Copenhagen Philharmonic, Montreal Symphony Orchestra, and Orchestre de Chambre de Lausanne. She won the 2014 Ovatie award for her performance as soprano and conductor at the Concertgebouw in Amsterdam with the Ludwig Orchestra.

In 2019, the Gothenburg Symphony Orchestra (GSO) named Hannigan its principal guest conductor. In December 2023, the GSO announced that her contract has been extended until the 2027–2028 season. She was the Première Artiste Invitée of the Orchestre philharmonique de Radio France for three seasons starting in 2022. Hannigan first guest-conducted the Iceland Symphony Orchestra in 2022. In May 2024, the Iceland Symphony Orchestra named her its next chief conductor and artistic director, for a three-year term beginning in 2026. She is also the Associate Artist of the London Symphony Orchestra and principal guest conductor of the Orchestre de Chambre de Lausanne.

She is a foreign member of the Royal Swedish Academy of Music. In 2026 she was named a recipient of the National Arts Centre Award.

== Honors and awards ==
- Personalité Musicale de l'Année du Syndicat de la Presse Française – 2012
- Opernwelt Singer of the Year – 2013
- Member of the Order of Canada – 2016
- Grammy Award for Best Classical Solo Vocal Album (for Crazy Girl Crazy) – 2018
- Preis der deutschen Schallplattenkritik Ehrenpreise – 2018
- Rolf Schock Prize in the Musical Arts – 2018
- Léonie Sonning Music Prize – 2020
- Dresden Music Festival Prize – 2020
- Officier des Arts et des Lettres – 2022
- Gramophone Classical Music Award for Artist of the Year – 2022
- Musical America Artist of the Year – 2025
- Polar Music Prize – 2025
- National Arts Centre Award – 2026

== Positions held ==
- Principal Guest Conductor of the Gothenburg Symphony Orchestra (2019 - present)
- Première Artiste Invitée of the Orchestre philharmonique de Radio France (2022 - 2025)
- Associate Artist of the London Symphony Orchestra (2022 - present)
- Reinbert de Leeuw Professor of Music at the Royal Academy of Music (2023 - present)
- Principale Cheffe Invitée of the Orchestre de Chambre de Lausanne (2024 - present)
- Chief Conductor and Artistic Director of the Iceland Symphony Orchestra (2026 - present)

== Recordings ==
- Spirit Song: The Vocal Music of Harry Freedman (Centrediscs, 2000)
- Writing to Vermeer (Nonesuch Records, 2006)
- Luca Francesconi (Kairos, 2008)
- Correspondances, conducted by Esa-Pekka Salonen (Deutsche Grammophon, 2012)
- Lulu (Bel Air Classiques, 2014)
- George Benjamin: Written on Skin (Nimbus Records, 2014)
- let me tell you, with the Symphonieorchester des Bayerischen Rundfunks conducted by Andris Nelsons (Winter & Winter Records, 2016)
- Socrate, with Reinbert de Leeuw (Winter & Winter, 2016)
- Crazy Girl Crazy, with the Ludwig Orchestra (Alpha Classics, 2017)
- Stravinsky, with the London Symphony Orchestra conducted by Simon Rattle (LSO Live, 2017)
- La Passione, with the Ludwig Orchestra (Alpha Classics, 2020)
- Dance With Me, with the Ludwig Orchestra (Alpha Classics, 2022)
- Sehnsucht, with Raoul Steffani, Camerata RCO, and Rolf Verbeek (Alpha Classics, 2022)
- Infinite Voyage, with Bertrand Chamayou and the Emerson String Quartet (Alpha Classics, 2023)
- Messiaen, with Bertrand Chamayou (Alpha Classics, 2024)
- Hannigan Sings Zorn: Volume One, with Stephan Gosling (Tzadik, 2024)
- Hannigan Sings Zorn: Volume Two, with Stephan Gosling, Ikue Mori, Jorge Roeder, Ches Smith, Jay Campbell, Sae Hashimoto, Chris Otto, John Pickford Richards, and Austin Wulliman (Tzadik, 2024)
- Electric Fields with David Chalmin, Katia Labèque, Marielle Labèque (Alpha, 2025)
- La Donna del lago with Massimo Pupillo, David Chalmin (2026)
- An American Dream? with Gothenburg Symphony Orchestra (Alpha, 2026)

=== DVDs ===
- Canadees Podiumdier (NTR, 2014)
- Lulu (Bel Air Classiques, 2014)
- Written on Skin (Opus Arte, 2014)
- I'm a creative animal (Accentus Music, 2015)
- C'est presque au bout du monde (3e Scène, 2015)
- Hamlet (Opus Arte, 2018)
- La Voix Humaine (Arthaus Musik, 2018)
- Lessons in Love and Violence (Opus Arte, 2019)
- The Rake's Progress and Taking Risks (Accentus Music, 2020)

== Personal life ==
Hannigan was married to Dutch theatre director Gijs de Lange until 2015. Since 2017, she has lived in Paris. From 2015 to 2024, she was in a relationship with French actor Mathieu Amalric. Since 2021 she has lived in Finistère Brittany France.
