= Jaroslav Řídký =

Czech composer (1897–1956)

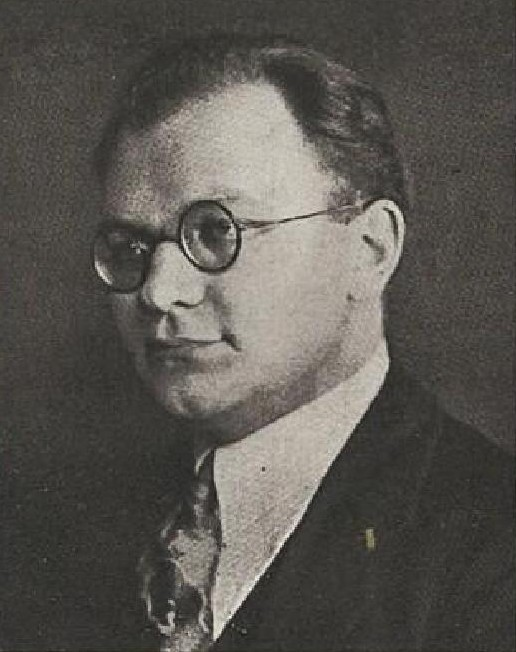
Jaroslav Řídký

Jaroslav Řídký (25 August 1897 – 14 August 1956) was a Czech composer, conductor, harpist, and music teacher.

== Life ==
Řídký was born at Reichenberg, now Liberec. From 1919 to 1923 he studied at the Prague Conservatory with Josef Bohuslav Foerster, Karel Boleslav Jirák, and Jaroslav Křička. Besides teaching at the Conservatory from 1924 to 1949, he also played the harp for the Czech Philharmonic Orchestra between 1924 and 1938, and conducted the Philharmonic choir from 1925 to 1930.

In 1928 Řídký attended as a conductor the premiere of Leoš Janáček´s chamber composition Capriccio. He died at Poděbrady.

== Style ==
He composed seven symphonies and one sinfonietta, one string serenade, concertos for violin (1), piano (1), and cello (2), chamber music, pieces for piano, cantatas, and also prepared his own arrangements of folk songs. His work is composed rather in traditional style, first compositions are influenced by romanticism, later he composed in traditional, neo-classical style. His oeuvre contains 47 numbered opuses, both in chamber and orchestral instrumentation. Řídký composed also violin, piano and two violoncello concertos. In 1954 he was awarded National Prize for his Piano Concerto Op. 46.

== Selected works ==
Orchestral

- Symfonietta in C minor, Op. 1
- Symphony No. 1 in C♯ minor, Op. 3 (1924)
- Symphony No. 2 in D minor for orchestra with obbligato cello, Op. 4 (1925)
- Symphony No. 3 in A♭ major, Op. 8 (1927–1928)
- Symphony No. 4 in A major, Op. 10 (1928)
- Předehra (Ouvertura) (Overture), Op. 11 (1929)
- Symphony No. 5 in E (C?) minor, Op. 17 (1932)
- Malá suita (Little Suite), Op. 18 (1931–1932); original version for cello and piano
- Symphony No. 6, Op. 35 (1938); incomplete: movement I in sketch form
- Serenáda (Serenade) in E major for string orchestra, Op. 37 (1941)
- Symfonietta for chamber orchestra, Op. 40 (1945–1946)
- Slavnostní pochod (Marcia festiva) (1947, 1950); 1947 version for wind orchestra
- Symphony No. 7, Op. 47 (1955–1956)
- Smuteční fanfára
- Dvě suity z hudby k filmu „Mánes“ (Mánes: 2 Suites from the Film)

Wind orchestra

- Slavnostní pochod (Marcia festiva) (1947)
- Milada (1951)

Concertante

- Concerto for violin and orchestra, Op. 7 (1927)
- Concerto No. 1 in F♯ minor for cello and orchestra, Op. 14 (1930)
- Nocturne for cello and orchestra, Op. 19 (1931–1932)
- Concerto No. 2 for cello and orchestra, Op. 36 (1940)
- Concerto for piano and orchestra, Op. 46 (1952); written for his wife Jaroslava Řídká, who gave the premiere in 1953

Chamber music

- Sonata in E minor for cello and piano, Op. 2 (1923)
- Quintet in A major for clarinet and string quartet, Op. 5 (1926)
- String Quartet No. 1 in G♯ minor, Op. 6 (1927)
- String Quartet No. 2, Op. 9 (1929)
- Serenata appasionata in C♯ minor for violin and piano, Op. 12 (1930)
- Adagio for cello and piano (published 1932); also for viola and piano
- Furiant in G major for cello and piano, Op. 15 (published 1932)
- String Quartet No. 3 in A major, Op. 16 (1932)
- Malá suita (Little Suite) for cello and piano, Op. 18 (1931–1932); also orchestrated
- Pět snadných kusů (5 Easy Pieces) for cello or violin and piano (1932)

1. Ekloga (Eclogue)
2. Alla marcia
3. Valse moderato
4. Scherzino
5. Menuet

- Nokturno a gavota (Nocturne and Gavotte) for cello or violin and piano (1932)
- String Quartet No. 4 in G major, Op. 20 (1933)
- Capriccio for cello and piano, Op. 21 (published 1933)
- Alla polka for cello and piano (published 1933)
- Andante a allegretto (Andante and Allegretto) for cello and piano (published 1933)
- Cantabile a menuetto (Cantabile and Menuetto) for cello and piano (published 1933)
- Ukolébavka a groteska (Lullaby and Grotesque; Berceuse et grotesque) for violin and piano, Op. 26 (published 1933); Ukolébavka also for viola and piano
- Polka-fantasie for violin or cello and piano (published 1933)
- Čtyři snadné skladby (4 Easy Pieces; 4 Morceaux faciles) for violin and piano, Op. 28 (published 1934)

1. Polka-capriccio
2. Air; also for cello and piano
3. Chanson
4. Marche grotesque

- Melodia a marcia (Melodie and Marcia) for cello and piano (published 1934)
- Pohádka máje [I. maj] (Fairy Tale: In May; En mai), Trio for violin, cello and piano (published 1934)
- Čtyři skladby pro mládež (4 Pieces for Young Players) for violin and piano
- Čtyři malé skladby (4 Little Pieces; 4 Morceaux petites) for cello and piano, Op. 29 (1934)

1. Elegie
2. Capriccietto
3. Barcarolla
4. Menuetto

- Čtyři skladbičky (4 Bagatelles) for cello and piano, Op. 31

1. Ukolébavka (Berceuse)
2. Český tanec (Danse bohème)
3. Sousedská (Danse rustique)
4. Pochodem (En marche)

- Nonet No. 1 in F♯ minor for flute, oboe, clarinet, bassoon, horn, violin, viola, cello and double bass, Op. 32 (1934–1935)
- String Quartet No. 5 in A minor, Op. 34 (1937)
- Nonet No. 2 for flute, oboe, clarinet, bassoon, horn, violin, viola, cello and double bass, Op. 39 (1943)
- Kvintet pro dechové nástroje (Wind Quintet) for flute, oboe, clarinet, bassoon and horn, Op. 41 (1945)
- Radostná sonatina (Sonatina gioiosa) for violin and piano (published 1953)
- Sonata No. 2 for cello and piano, Op. 43 (1951)
- Piano Trio, Op. 44 (1950–1951)

Piano

- Klavírní skladby (Piano Pieces), Op. 13
- Rytmus a melodie (Rhythm and Melody), 10 Instructive Pieces, Op. 23
- Tři polky pro klavír (3 Polkas for Piano)

1. Poetická polka II.
2. Polka pro Jarušku
3. Polka in C

Choral

- Zimní pohádka (A Winter's Tale) for chorus and orchestra, Op. 33 (1937)
- Rodnému kraji, Cantata for mixed chorus and orchestra, Op. 38 (1941); after a Poem by František Branislav (1900–1968)

Film scores

- Mánes
