= Otakar Hollmann =

Czech pianist

Otakar Hollmann (29 January 1894 – 9 May 1967) was a Czech pianist who was notable in the repertoire for left-handed pianists. Although little known now, he was considered second only to Paul Wittgenstein in the promotion of the left-hand repertoire. He commissioned works for the left hand from a number of composers, most notably Janáček, Martinů, Schulhoff and Foerster. He was also a composer in his own right.

== Biography ==
Hollmann was born in Vienna on 29 January 1894. He initially studied as a violinist with K. Baumgarten. Some of his early compositions were published in 1915.

On active service in World War I, a bullet went through his palm, injuring the metacarpus of the right hand but, contrary to some sources, he did not lose his right arm totally.

After the war, being now unable to play the violin, he took up the piano, studying left-hand technique with Adolf Mikas in Prague until 1924. He also studied composition with Vítězslav Novák 1925–26. He made his concert debut as a left-handed pianist in 1927, and later performed in a number of European countries.

On 11 June 1926, Hollmann wrote to Leoš Janáček asking for a work for left hand. Janáček did not respond, but he thought about the idea for some time. By 30 October he had composed a work he called Capriccio for piano left-hand and chamber ensemble, but the first Hollmann knew of it was when he read about it in a newspaper. Although Janáček apparently wrote the work at Hollmann's instigation, he gave no indication anywhere that he dedicated the work to Hollmann or even wrote it with him in mind as performer. Janáček even refused to reserve the first performance for Hollmann, although he was eventually given that honour. Hollmann premiered the Capriccio in Prague on 2 March 1928, with members of the Czech Philharmonic under Jaroslav Řídký.

Meanwhile, Erwin Schulhoff had written his Suite No. 3 for piano left-hand, in five movements, for Hollmann, who premiered it in Belgrade, Yugoslavia, in November 1927.

Bohuslav Martinů's Divertimento (Concertino) in G for piano left-hand and small orchestra was written for Hollmann in 1926–28.

Josef Bohuslav Foerster wrote his Notturno and Fantastico, Op. 142 for Hollmann (written 1930s, published 1945).

Other composers who wrote works for Hollmann included Jaroslav Tomášek (Sonata for left hand, Op. 7, which Hollmann recorded) and Václav Kaprál.

On 17 May 1954, in Prague, Hollmann and Aleš Jermář gave the first performance of Jarmil Burghauser's Ciacona for organ and piano.

Hollmann retired in 1955, and died on 9 May 1967, aged 73.
