= Ján Zimmer =

Slovak composer

Ján Zimmer (16 May 1926 – 21 January 1993) was a Slovak post-romantic composer and pianist.

== Biography ==
Ján Zimmer was born in Ružomberok, North Slovakia. He studied at the Bratislava Conservatory between 1941 and 1948 with Anna Kafendová (piano), Józef Weber (organ) and Eugen Suchoň (composition). Afterwards he studied composition with Ferenc Farkas at the Budapest Music Academy, and in Salzburg in 1949. From 1948 to 1952 he taught music theory and piano at the Bratislava Conservatory. He also worked for the Czechoslovak Radio. From 1952 he devoted his time exclusively to composition and performance as a concert pianist (he performed in particular the piano part of his own piano concertos). His works, in the post-romantic style, are overall expressionistic and occasionally incorporate Slovakian folk music. Some of his works, such as the cantata The Uprising (1954), the powerful symphonic poem Strečno (1958), and the vocal symphonic poem Liberation (1975) are written in a nationalist spirit. Ján Zimmer composed more than 120 works, including especially two operas (1963 and 1977), twelve symphonies (from 1955 to 1985), seven piano concertos (from 1949 to 1985), many other concertos for various instruments, chamber music, songs, choral works (including a Magnificat, 1951), and numerous pieces for piano solo. He died in 1993 in Bratislava, at age 66.

== Works ==
The following lists show all his compositions in the genres opera, symphony, and works for piano and orchestra. They show selected works in the other genres.

=== Opera ===
- Kráľ Oidipus, opera, based on Oedipus rex op. 48 (1963; rev. 1969)
- Herakles, opera-pantomime, op. 70 (1972). 40'
- Odlomený čas, opera, op. 76 (1977)

=== Symphony ===
- Symphony No. 1, op. 21 (1955). 26'
- Symphony No. 2, op. 26 (1958). 30'
- Symphony No. 3, op. 33 (1959). 31'
- Symphony No. 4 for soprano, tenor, choir and orchestra, op. 37 (1959). 40'
- Symphony No. 5, op. 44 (1961). 20'
- Symphony No. 6 Improvisata, op. 51 (1965). 25'
- Symphony No. 7, op. 54 (1966). 26'
- Symphony No. 8, op. 68 (1971). 20'
- Symphony No. 9, op. 72 (1973). 31'
- Symphony No. 10 Homage to Haydn, for strings and woodwinds, op. 92 (1979). 29'
- Symphony No. 11 for orchestra with organ, op. 98 (1980). 20'
- Symphony No. 12 for orchestra and choir, op. 107 (1985). 18'
- Symphony No. 13 Patriotic, op. 119 (1992). 20'

=== Orchestra ===
- Pioneers' March (1952). 3'
- Tatra I, symphonic suite No. 1, op. 11 (1952). 21'
- Celebration Overture "For the Liberation of Bratislava", op. 22 (1955). 7'
- Tatra II, symphonic suite No. 2, op. 25 (1956). 23'
- Strečno, symphonic poem on the village Strečno, op. 34 (1958). 13'
- French Suite in C minor, op. 62 (1968). 11'
- Song Without Words, op. 66 (1970). 15'
- Concert Overture (No. 1), op. 82 (1975)
- Overture, op. 88 (1977). 8'
- Slovak Mountains, symphonic suite, op. 89 (1978). 13'
- Concert Overture (No. 2) for Large orchestra, op. 96 (1981). 8'
- Suite Youth, op. 105 (1983)

=== Piano and orchestra ===
- Piano Concerto No. 1, op. 5 (1949). 39'
- Concerto grosso for Two String Orchestras, Two Pianos and Percussion, op. 7 (1951). 17'
- Piano Concerto No. 2, op. 10 (1952). 28'
- Rhapsody for piano and orchestra, op. 18 (1954). 20'
- Concertino for piano and Strings, op. 19 (1955). 28'
- Piano Concerto No. 3, op. 29 (1958). 32'
- Piano Concerto No. 4, op. 36 (1960). 16'
- Little Fantasia for piano and orchestra, op. 40 (1960). 9'
- Piano Concerto No. 5 for the left-hand only, op. 50 (1961–64). 20'
- Nálada (Mood) for piano and strings (1967). 9'
- Concerto for Two Pianos and orchestra, op. 57 (1967). 19'
- Piano Concerto No. 6, op. 71 (1972). 19'
- Fantasy for choir, piano and orchestra, op. 83 (1976). 18'
- Piano Concerto No. 7, op. 106 (1985). 30'
- Three Tanzstücke (Dance Pieces) for piano and orchestra, op. 112 (1988). 8'

=== Other instruments and orchestra ===
- Violin Concerto, op. 15 (1953). 27'
- Concerto for Organ, Strings and percussion, op. 27 (1957). 23'
- Concerto da camera for Oboe and Strings, op. 47 (1962). 20'
- Old Bratislava, Baroque Suite for harpsichord, organ and orchestra, op. 80 (1975). 18'
- Chamber Concerto for organ, strings and percussion, op. 102 (1983). 23'
- Concerto polifonico for organ and orchestra, op. 108 (1986). 18'
- Concertino classico for violin and Strings, op. 117 (1986)
- Concerto for viola and chamber orchestra (1989)

=== Vocal and choral ===
- Magnificat for choir and orchestra, op. 9 (1951). 16'
- Peace, symphonic poem for choir and orchestra, op. 14 (1953). 15'
- The Uprising, cantata for choir and orchestra, op. 17 (1954). 16'
- Memory (of Ľudovíta Štúra), symphonic poem for speaker and orchestra, op. 24 (1956). 14'
- Symphony No. 4 for soprano, tenor, choir and orchestra, op. 37 (1959). 40'
- Dove of Peace, Cantata for soloists, choir and orchestra, op. 41 (1960). 6'
- In Memoriam Jiřího Wolkera, song cycle for Bass and Piano, op. 43 (score published in 1963)
- Four Madrigals on English Texts, op. 52 (score published in 1964). 9'
- Four Motets on Latin Texts, op. 58 (1967). 8'
- The Dead Do Not Come Back, Oratorio for speaker, choir and orchestra, op. 60 (1968). 50'
- Songs about spring, song cycle for Tenor and Piano, op. 67 (score published in 1971)
- Bratislava Spring, cantata for choir and orchestra, op. 77 (1974). 14'
- Liberation, symphonic poem for speaker and orchestra, op. 78 (1975). 20'
- Two Male Choirs, op. 79 (1976)
- Fantasy for choir, piano and orchestra, op. 83 (1976). 18'
- Symphony No. 12 for orchestra and choir, op. 107 (1985). 18'
- Early in the morning, song cycle on text by Jána Smreka, op. ?. 10'

=== Chamber music and solo instruments ===
- Variations for violin, viola and cello, op. 1 (1945). 12'
- Sonata for solo Viola, op. 31. 13'
- Fantasy and Toccata, op. 32 (1958). 6'
- String Quartet No. 1, op. 39 (1960). 20'
- Concerto for solo Organ in D, op. 42 (1960). 12'
- Two Slovak Dances, for violin and piano (score published in 1960 ?)
- Sonata for Organ No. 1, op. 65 (1970). 12'
- Balada and Burleska for solo viola, op. 84 (1976). 8'
- Poetic Sonata for violin and piano, op. 85. 13'
- Variations in modo classico, for two violins and viola, op. 87 (1977). 12'
- Sonata for solo Flute, op. 91 (1981). 9'
- Trio for flute, violin and piano, op. 93 (1979). 11'
- Sonata for Organ No. 2, op. 97 (1981)
- String Quartet No. 2 In Memoriam Frico Kafenda, op. 100 (1983). 14'
- String Quartet No. 3, op. 110 (1987)

=== Piano solo and Two pianos ===
- Nálady (Moods), four pieces, op. 2 (1948). 15'
- Piano Sonata No. 1, op. 4 (1948). 20'
- Picture Book, Cycle of Ten Miniatures for Children, op. 13 (score published in 1957)
- Sonata for Two pianos No. 1, op. 16 (1954). 20'
- Prelude for the left-hand, op. 20. 5'
- Concerto for Piano without orchestra, op. 23 (1957). 25'
- Sonata for Two pianos No. 2, op. 35 (1959). 20'
- Piano Sonata No. 2, op. 45 (score published in 1964). 13'
- Sonata for Two pianos No. 3 In Memoriam Sergei Prokofiev, op. 53 (1965). 16'
- Piano Sonata No. 3, op. 55 (1966). 14'
- Etudes for Young Pianists (First Book), op. 56 (1966). 12'
- Etudes for Young Pianists (Second Book), op. 59 (score published in 1969). 15'
- Allegro and Andante for Two pianos, op. 63 (1969)
- Piano Sonata No. 4 Improvisata, op. 69 (score published in 1972)
- Sonata for Two pianos No. 4, op. 73 (1973). 15'
- Dvaja, op. 74 (1973). 15'
- Two Romantic Songs, op. 81 (1975). 15'
- Piano Sonata No. 5, op. 90 (1978). 12'
- Piano Sonata No. 6, op. 94 (1980). 14'
- Little Things for Piano, Instructive Pieces, op. 99 (score published in 1982)
- Bagatelle, op. 103 (1983–84)
- Introduction and Toccata, op. 109 (1987). 7'
- Piano Sonata No. 7 Ricordanza, op. 113 (1988)
- Variations on the name Eugen Suchoň, op. 115 (1988). 12'
- Four Compositions for piano duet, op. 116 (1988). 16'
- Antiphone, Variations for piano four-hands on the theme of gregorian choral, op. 120 (c. 1992)

== Sources ==
- Ján Zimmer Music Centre Slovakia
