= Piano Concerto No. 1 (Liszt) =

1855 musical work by Franz Liszt

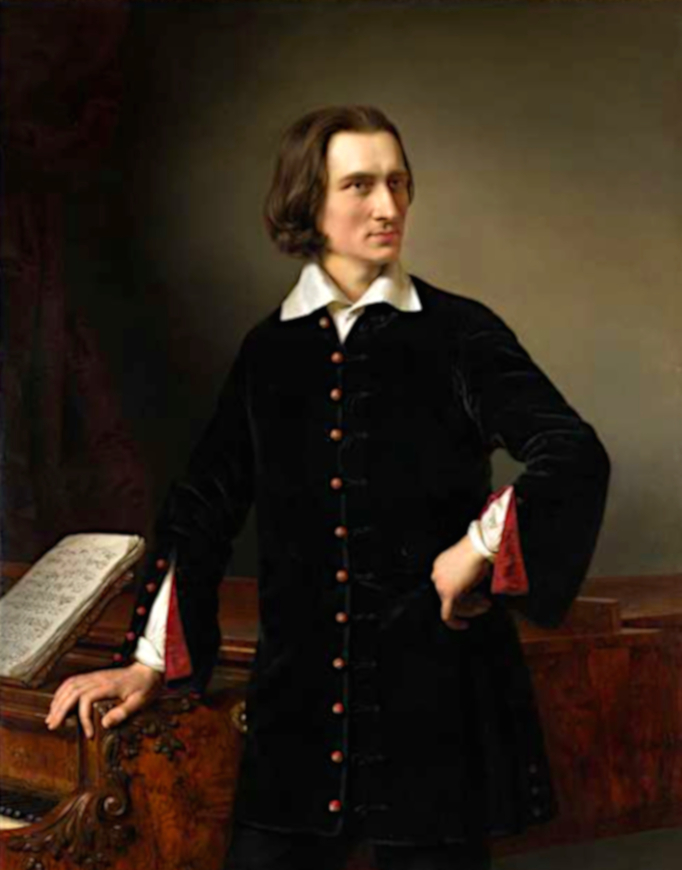
Franz Liszt, portrait by Hungarian painter Miklós Barabás, 1847

Franz Liszt composed his Piano Concerto No. 1 in E♭ major, S.124 over a 26-year period; the main themes date from 1830, while the final version is dated 1849. The concerto consists of four movements and lasts approximately 20 minutes. It premiered in Weimar on February 17, 1855, with Liszt at the piano and Hector Berlioz conducting.

== History ==
I. Allegro maestoso

II. Quasi adagio

III. Allegretto vivace – Allegro animato

IV. Allegro marziale animato
Performed by Artur Rubinstein and the Dallas Symphony Orchestra, under the baton of Antal Dorati

The main themes of Liszt's first piano concerto are written in a sketchbook dated 1830, when Liszt was nineteen years old. He seems to have completed the work in 1849, yet made further adjustments in 1853. It was first performed at Weimar in 1855, with the composer at the piano and Hector Berlioz conducting.

Liszt made yet more changes before publication in 1856. Béla Bartók described it as "the first perfect realisation of cyclic sonata form, with common themes being treated on the variation principle".

== Description ==
The concerto consists of four relatively short movements:

1. Allegro maestoso
2. Quasi adagio
3. Allegretto vivace – Allegro animato
4. Allegro marziale animato

=== I. Allegro maestoso ===
I. Allegro maestoso

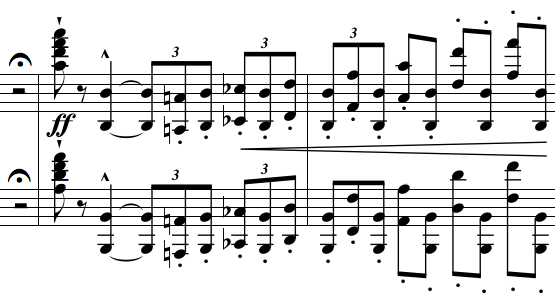
The first entrance in the first movement introduces a motive that is revisited several times.

The orchestra introduces the main theme of the piece with a powerful motif. A story exists that, to mock his critics, Liszt and his son-in-law, Hans von Bülow, put the words Das versteht ihr alle nicht, haha! (none of you understand this, ha-ha) to the notes of the opening two bars.

The piano then comes in with an octave passage, spanning four octaves. A duet ensues between the piano and the clarinet in a quiet and peaceful passage, which is soon taken over again by the main theme. Following this, the piano plays fast, downward chromatic octaves, before recapitulating a section from earlier in the movement, this time in G major.

The movement finishes with the main theme played by the strings while the piano imitates a harp with fast, quiet arpeggios, culminating with an upwards chromatic scale in sixths, diminishing to ppp volume.

=== II. Quasi adagio ===
The cellos and double basses introduce the Adagio section in a serene, unison cantabile, before the rest of the string section joins. Again, however, the cellos and double basses descend before the piano joins, in una corda. The piano uses the string theme and develops it further, playing in a nocturne-like style with soft, flowing left hand arpeggios and a cantabile melody in the right hand. The section reaches a climax where a strong fortissimo is played followed by a descending diminuendo scale.

After a brief general pause, the whole orchestra resumes, again playing the same theme. Then a cello plays the theme while the piano answers hurriedly with a developmental recitative section. This leads into a passage where solos in the woodwind section play a new theme while the piano plays long trills in the right hand and spread chords in the left. The passage is ended by the piano and clarinet in duet.

=== III. Allegretto vivace – Allegro animato ===
The triangle starts the movement with the string section following it. (The frequent and prominent use of the triangle led the conservative critic Eduard Hanslick to mock the work as a "Triangle Concerto".) The piano develops the theme further. This occurs throughout the whole movement; however, previous themes from the last two movements are reintroduced and combined to give this concerto its unique rhapsody-like form. This movement is decidedly jocular in character, with the performance direction at the start of the piano line of "capriccioso scherzando", and delicate, playful duets between the woodwind and piano occurring throughout.

The second half of the movement, however, takes a darker turn, when the piano, after concluding the scherzo section, plays an eerie, tremolando passage in the lower registers, with a development of the first theme played above, at pp dynamic. After this, the downward chromatic octaves reappear, but this time at p level, before the orchestra plays an ascending chromatic section, leading into a tonal recapitulation of the first theme. The movement ends with very similar music to the beginning of the first movement, with a blistering piano passage ending in an F diminished seventh chord (r.h.: F–A♭–D–F).

=== IV. Allegro marziale animato ===
A descending E♭ major scale is played before the orchestra plays the theme of the Adagio in thematic transformation. The piano follows this with a blistering solo octaves passage before joining in duet with various solo woodwind instruments in a dainty, lively section. The movement continues bringing in all the themes from throughout the concerto and combining them sequentially. In the final few passages, a new chromatic theme is introduced in which the piano is playing semiquavers and triplet quavers at the same time, an exercise in polyrhythm, while in unison with the strings.

The piece ends in Liszt's bravura style, with the now-familiar downward chromatic octaves theme, played in this recapitulation at breakneck presto speed, before changing to contrary chromatic octaves, reaching the tonic key of E♭ major and fff dynamic. The orchestra alone has the last two notes, which Liszt carefully utilised to highlight the importance of the orchestra in the piece, not just as an accompanying device for the piano.

== Orchestration ==
This concerto is scored for a relatively small orchestra and calls for the following instruments:

Solo piano

Woodwinds:

piccolo
2 flutes
2 oboes
2 clarinets in B♭
2 bassoons

Brass:

2 horns in F
2 trumpets in B♭
3 trombones (two tenor, one bass)

Percussion:

timpani
cymbals
triangle

Strings:

first and second violins
violas
cellos
double basses
