= Barbara Nissman =

American pianist (born 1944)

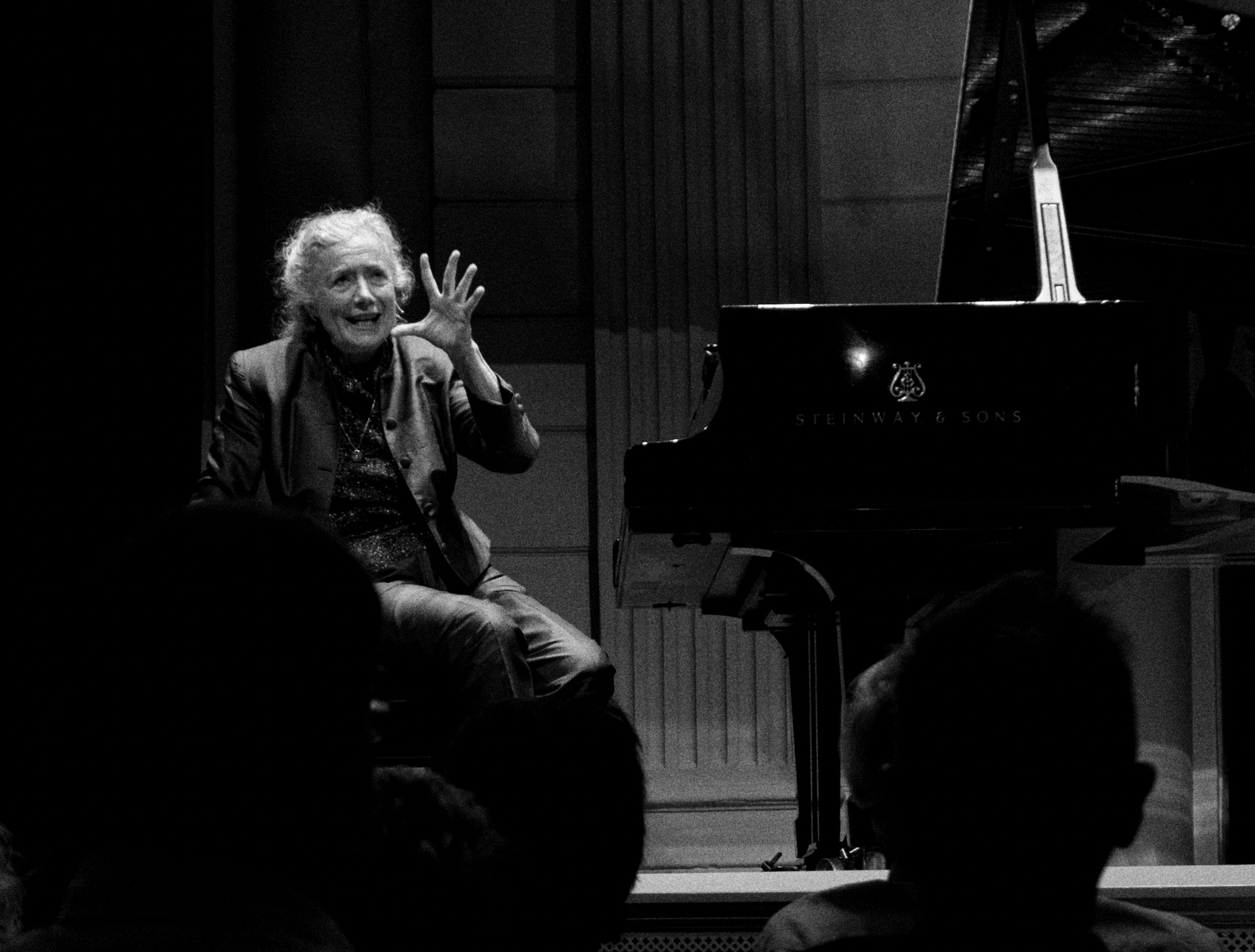
- Barbara Nissman at the Concertgebouw, 2017
- Born: December 31, 1944 (age 81); Philadelphia, Pennsylvania
- Education: University of Michigan
- Occupation: Concert pianist

Barbara Nissman (born December 31, 1944, in Philadelphia, Pennsylvania) is an American pianist. She is especially known for her interpretations and performances of the works of Alberto Ginastera and Sergei Prokofiev which feature prominently in her repertoire. She is also a writer, a producer of a series of DVDs, and a guest clinician presenting concerts, master classes and lectures world-wide.

Nissman's international career was personally launched by Eugene Ormandy with debuts arranged in all of the major European capitals after he heard her perform as a student at the University of Michigan. She subsequently made her American professional debut as soloist with Ormandy and the Philadelphia Orchestra. She has also performed with some of the leading orchestras in Europe, including the London Philharmonic, the Royal Philharmonic, the BBC Symphony, the Rotterdam Philharmonic and the Munich Philharmonic. In the United States she has appeared with the New York Philharmonic, the Philadelphia Orchestra, the Chicago Symphony, the Pittsburgh Symphony, the St. Louis Symphony, the National Symphony Orchestra and the Cleveland Orchestra, among others. She has worked with major conductors of our time, including Eugene Ormandy, Riccardo Muti, Stanislaw Skrowaczewski and Leonard Slatkin.

The final composition of Argentine composer Alberto Ginastera, Piano Sonata No. 3, was dedicated to Nissman; its first performance was given at Alice Tully Hall, Lincoln Center in 1982. Nissman uncovered the manuscript of Ginastera's Concierto Argentino in the Fleisher Collection of the Free Library of Philadelphia and reintroduced the piece in 2011 with the blessings of the composer's estate. In 2010, the last composition by Benjamin Lees, Visage, was written for Nissman. She has also participated in many other premiere performances.

Nissman made history in 1989 by becoming the first pianist to perform the complete piano sonatas of Sergei Prokofiev in a series of three recitals in both New York and London. Her recordings of this repertoire represented the first complete set of Prokofiev's piano sonatas made available on compact disc.

In June 2014 at Steinway Hall in New York City, Nissman launched her record label Three Oranges Recordings, devoted to furthering classical music and making it more accessible.

== Education and awards ==
Nissman attended the University of Michigan on full scholarship and received a Bachelor of Music degree in 1966. Upon graduation she was awarded the Stanley Medal (named after Albert A. Stanley, Director of the School of Music from 1888 to 1921), "presented annually to the graduating senior...most outstanding in his or her curriculum, with special consideration given to scholarship and public performance."

In 1966 she was awarded a three-year National Defense Education Act Title IV fellowship for her master and doctoral studies at the University of Michigan. Nissman was also awarded a three-year post-doctoral grant from the university (underwritten by the Power Foundation in 1969) to begin her international performing career. In 1981 she was the recipient of the Michigan Alumnae Council's Athena Award, bestowed annually since 1973 "on outstanding alumnae who have distinguished themselves in professional and humanitarian endeavors," and the School of Music's Citation of Merit Award in 1996, presented annually "to recognize and honor individuals who have made outstanding contributions to society, their profession, [or to the university]."

Nissman also received grants from the Martha Baird Rockefeller Foundation and The Philadelphia Foundation, as well as a National Endowment for the Arts recital grant to present the Prokofiev sonata series at Alice Tully Hall, Lincoln Center in 1989.

In 2003, Nissman was one of 23 pianists profiled in the article "Hall of Legends," which appeared in the Steinway & Sons 150th Anniversary Commemorative Publication.

In 2006, Nissman was elected to the Court of Honor of Distinguished Daughters of the Philadelphia High School for Girls "for outstanding lifetime achievement as an internationally acclaimed concert pianist, recording artist and educator."

In 2008 Nissman was a recipient of the Governor's Arts Award from the State of West Virginia for "Distinguished Service to the Arts." In March 2016, she was honored by the State of West Virginia Division of Culture and History with its "Order of the Arts & Historical Letters" as well as its "Excellence in Support of the Arts" award.

In March, 2020 Nissman received the Governor's Lifetime Achievement Award in the Arts from the State of West Virginia.

In June, 2023, Barbara Nissman was inducted into the West Virginia Music Hall of Fame joining well known classical musicians: George Crumb, Eleanor Steber, Phyllis Curtin and jazz and country greats from the state of West Virginia.

In May, 2024, Barbara Nissman was awarded an Honorary Doctorate of Music degree from West Virginia University.

== Alberto Ginastera ==
Barbara Nissman has long been associated with the music of Argentine composer Alberto Ginastera, and the composer's final work, Piano Sonata No. 3, Op. 54 (1982) is dedicated to her. In 1976 she was invited by the composer to play his Piano Concerto No. 1, Op. 28 (1961) in Geneva at his sixtieth birthday celebration, where she performed the work with L'Orchestre de la Suisse Romande conducted by Jean-Marie Auberson. She also presented the Netherlands premiere of the concerto at Amsterdam’s Concertgebouw and its UK premiere with the BBC Symphony, and has performed the concerto with the Chicago Symphony, St. Louis Symphony and the New York Philharmonic under Leonard Slatkin.

In 2006 she co-hosted a five-part BBC Radio 3 series that featured Ginastera as Composer-of-the-Week. In 2011, with the University of Michigan Symphony Orchestra conducted by Kenneth Kiesler, she performed all 3 piano concertos in one evening including Concierto Argentino for piano and orchestra (an early work written in 1935 and then withdrawn from the catalogue by the composer shortly after its first performance) and the first performance in its original form of Piano Concerto No. 2, Op. 39 (1972). Nissman et al.'s disc of all three concerti on the Pierian label represents the first recording of all three works and the "official reintroduction" of the Concierto Argentino. After Nissman discovered this concerto in the Edwin A. Fleisher Collection of Orchestral Music in Philadelphia, Aurora Natola-Ginastera, the widow of the composer, granted her exclusivity to perform the work and also to make available its first recording. Nissman is also the editor of the new critical edition of Piano Concerto No. 2, published by Boosey & Hawkes.

In 2016 Nissman celebrated Ginastera's 100th birthday with a series of concerts devoted to the man and his music at Spectrum in NYC and also at Kings Place, London as well as master classes and lectures throughout the UK. On April 28, 2016, Nissman gave a lecture and performed works by Ginastera at a special celebration held at the Argentine Embassy in Washington, D.C.

Nissman's article "Remembering Alberto Ginastera--a centenary tribute" appeared in the April–June 2016 issue of Musical Opinion (UK)

Nissman has recorded Ginastera’s complete solo piano repertoire and also his piano/chamber works with Aurora Natola-Ginastera, cello; Ruben Gonzales, violin; and the Laurentian String Quartet.

Her video documentary, Alberto Ginastera, "A Man of Latin America", A Masterclass with Barbara Nissman includes interviews with the composer and his family as well as the conductor Leonard Slatkin, Keith Emerson of Emerson, Lake & Palmer and jazz pianist Chick Corea. Masterclasses and performances by Barbara of his three piano sonatas and his early Danzas Argentinas are also included.

== Sergei Prokofiev ==
Nissman made history in 1989 by becoming the first pianist to perform the complete piano sonatas of Sergei Prokofiev in a series of three recitals in both New York and London, and premiered the two-page fragment of Prokofiev's Piano Sonata No. 10 in E minor, Op. 137 (1952) during her Prokofiev series at Lincoln Center. Her recordings of this repertoire represented the first complete set of Prokofiev's piano sonatas made available on compact disc.

As a Prokofiev scholar and authority, Nissman first visited the Soviet Union in 1984, at the height of the Cold War, as a guest of the Embassy of Denmark in Moscow. In 1998 she returned to Russia as a guest of the Moscow State Conservatory to present master classes and concerts of Prokofiev's music, and also presented master classes at the St. Petersburg Conservatory.

In commemoration of Prokofiev's 100th birthday in 1991, Nissman performed the complete cycle of his piano sonatas throughout Europe and the United States.

On May 8, 2004, Nissman presented a lecture at the University of London titled "Prokofiev Meets Gershwin: Gershwin Meets Prokofiev," as part of a conference titled Prokofiev and America. The conference, which also featured lectures by Arnold Whittall, Alastair Macaulay, Harlow Robinson, Noëlle Mann, et al., was jointly sponsored by the university's Sergei Prokofiev Archive and its Institute of United States Studies (now the Institute for the Study of the Americas). The lecture was adapted into an article titled "When Gershwin Met Prokofiev" that was printed in the Winter 2005 issue of Piano Today magazine and adapted for the January 2016 issue of the Three Oranges Journal. Nissman also performed several of Prokofiev's solo piano works at the conference's John Coffin Memorial Recital.

Nissman was a featured performer at the dedication of Columbia University's Prokofiev Archive on April 24, 2015, with members of the Prokofiev family in attendance. She was also a featured performer at the International Prokofiev Symposium, held at Louisiana State University in February 2016, that also featured addresses by Richard Taruskin, Simon Morrison and Gabriel Prokofiev.

Prokofiev biographer Daniel Jaffé, in the December 2008 issue of BBC Music Magazine, selected Nissman's recordings as the best recordings of Prokofiev's piano music.

Awarded a grant by the UK-based Oleg Prokofiev Family Trust, Nissman released in 2025 a video documentary, Serge Prokofiev “A Man Misunderstood” focusing on his Three War Sonatas, including in-depth masterclasses and performances of each sonata by Nissman. Also included are interviews with his grandson, the composer Gabriel Prokofiev, his biographer Harlow Robinson and a Prokofiev expert from the Moscow Conservatory, Natalia Savkina.

== Béla Bartók ==
In 2002 Scarecrow Press published Nissman's book, Bartók and the Piano: A Performer's View, including a full-length CD of selected works performed by the author. At the University of Michigan Nissman studied with György Sándor, himself a student of Béla Bartók.

Nissman was the first to perform and record Bartók’s unpublished 1898 Sonata, which she discovered in the Morgan Library's manuscript collection while researching her book. Out of Doors, the first release on Nissman's own label Three Oranges Recordings, pays homage to Bartok's 1926 composition.

== Three Oranges Recordings ==
Three Oranges Recordings is an independent record label conceived by Nissman and registered as a business in the State of West Virginia on January 1, 2014. The mission and purpose of the label is to educate and further the cause of classical music, making it more accessible, relevant and enjoyable to a larger audience.

Three Oranges Recordings was created to maintain ownership and control of Nissman's complete discography when prior arrangements dissolved. The official launch of the label took place on June 19, 2014 at Steinway Hall in New York City and included an informal concert of excerpts from the first two releases on the new label, Out of Doors and Fireworks!, followed by a reception and CD signing. The record label was also launched in Pittsburgh at Duquesne University on May 14, 2014.

At present the label includes 33 releases of both CDs and DVDs. With the 2020 release of Watershed, orchestral music by the American composer Lynn Emberg Purse (including performances by jazz trumpeter Sean Jones, Adam Liu on cello and erhu, saxophonist Mike Tomaro, trombonist Edward Kocher, and performed by the Duquesne University Symphony Orchestra conducted by Daniel Meyer and Sidney Harth), the label has opened to releasing recordings by other outstanding artists.

The releases on the Three Oranges Recordings label are:

- 3OR-01: Alberto Ginastera: The Complete Music for Piano & Piano/Chamber Ensembles (2014).
- 3OR-02: Prokofiev by Nissman: The Complete Sonatas (2014).
- 3OR-03: Superstar! Music of Franz Liszt (2014).
- 3OR-04: Folk Music & More: Music of Béla Bartók (2014).
- 3OR-05: Visions: Sonatas of Beethoven, Vol. I (2014).
- 3OR-06: Longing...Music of Frederic Chopin (2014).
- 3OR-07: The Storyteller: Music of Robert Schumann (2014).
- 3OR-08: A Noble Heart: Music of Johannes Brahms (2014).
- 3OR-09: Love & Loss, Volume I: Music of Rachmaninoff (2014).
- 3OR-10: Love & Loss, Volume II: Music of Rachmaninoff (2014).
- 3OR-11: Dramatic Visions. Music of Beethoven, Prokofiev, Schubert, Wagner, Liszt and Chopin (2014).
- 3OR-12: Glory in the Highest! Music of Bach-Busoni, Barber, Franck, Beethoven, Granados, Ginastera and Debussy (2014).
- 3OR-13: Triumph! Beethoven "Hammerklavier", plus music of Bach, Liszt and Prokofiev (2014).
- 3OR-14: Journeys of the Soul. Music of Bach, Ravel, Liszt, Scriabin and Balakirev (2014).
- 3OR-15: Love & War. Prokofiev's Sonata no. 6, plus music of Liszt, Benjamin Lees, Bartók and Chopin (2014).
- 3OR-16: Romantic Tales. Music of Chopin, Ravel, Prokofiev, Buxtehude (arr. Prokofiev), Scriabin, Mendelssohn, Schumann and Rachmaninoff (2014).
- 3OR-17: Not TOO serious... Beethoven's Diabelli Variations, plus music of Bartók, Liszt and Prokofiev (2014).
- 3OR-18: Fascinating Rhythms! Music of Prokofiev, Schumann, Chopin, Benjamin Lees, Albéniz, Ginastera and Gershwin (2014).
- 3OR-19: Out of Doors. Bartók's Out of Doors, plus music by Schubert, Chopin, Rachmaninoff, Hummel, Mendelssohn and Prokofiev (2014).
- 3OR-20: Fireworks! Brahms Sonata no. 3 in F minor, plus music by Liszt, Scarlatti and Debussy (2014).
- 3OR-21: Franz Liszt: Portrait of the Man and His Masterwork, the Sonata in B minor (DVD)(2017).
- 3OR-22: Liszt: The Transcendentals. 12 Etudes, plus Funérailles and Valse Oubliée No. 1 in F♯ minor (2017).
- 3OR-23: Beethoven: The Late Sonatas. Piano Sonata No. 30 (Op. 109), No. 31 (Op. 110) and No. 32 (Op. 111) (2017).
- 3OR-24: CHOPIN! Sonata in B minor, Berceuse, Four Scherzi (2017).
- 3OR-25: Chopin: The Nocturnes and Barcarolle & Polonaise in F♯ minor (2017).
- 3OR-26: Rachmaninoff, Prokofiev & Ramey. Rachmaninoff Second Piano Sonata (earlier, uncut version), Six Moments Musicaux, Prokofiev Tenth Sonata fragment (1953), plus the first performance of Phillip Ramey's Tenth Piano Sonata, dedicated to Barbara Nissman (2019).
- 3OR-27: Beethoven: The Virtuoso. The Early Sonatas. Piano Sonata No. 3 (Op. 2, No. 3), No. 4 (Op. 7), No. 12 (Op. 26) (2020).
- 3OR-28: Watershed: Orchestral Works by Lynn Emberg Purse. Watershed, Sketches of America, Arcadian Tone Poems (2020).
- 3OR-29: Schubert: Voice of a Poet. The Last Sonatas. D.959, D.960 (2021).
- 3OR-30: Alberto Ginastera, "A Man of Latin America", A Masterclass with Barbara Nissman (DVD)(2022).
- 3OR-31: Beethoven: The Visionary. Piano Sonata No. 15 (Op. 28; Pastorale), No. 17 (Op. 31 No. 2; Tempest), and No. 18 (Op. 31 No. 3; The Hunt) (2022).
- 3OR-32: Beethoven: Voice of the Future. Piano Sonata No. 22 (Op. 54), No. 24 (Op. 78), No. 26 (Op. 81a; Les Adieux), No. 27 (Op. 90), and No. 28 (Op. 101) (2023).
- 3OR-33: Sergei Prokofiev, "A Man Misunderstood", The Three War Sonatas (1939-1944) (DVD)(2025).

== Notable achievements ==
From 1977 to 1980 Nissman served as artist in residence for the John Deere corporation, providing "recitals, master classes, and a music lecture series to Deere plant communities in the U.S. and abroad for six months each year." This was the first time an international corporation employed a classical artist to appear in factories, plants, and branch houses throughout the United States, Mexico and Europe. Prior to her work with John Deere, she participated in the Affiliate Artists program, serving from 1974 to 1976 as Affiliate Artist for the Arizona Commission on the Arts, widening the audience for classical music by presenting informal concerts at unconventional venues.

From 1978 to 1980, Nissman appeared on BBC Television's popular daytime show, Pebble Mill at One, and introduced the series Barbara & Friends with Barbara chatting informally about her favorite composer "friends" and their music. A documentary was made by BBC Television about Barbara and her outreach work in schools, factories and in the concert hall.

In 1982, Nissman was the featured performer in the first Gracht (Canal) concert held in Amsterdam on the Prinsengracht and attended by 8,000 people. The Prinsengracht concerts have remained a popular summer tradition, with audiences arriving on foot or in their boats to listen. 40 years later, in 2022, Nissman again was a lead star at the famous Prinsengrachtconcert. She was invited on June 18, 2025 to celebrate the 750th anniversary of the City of Amsterdam with a gala concert on board the Clipper Stadt Amsterdam in New York City's harbor. It was the city of Amsterdam's gift, bringing a version of their Prinsengracht concert to the people of New Amsterdam (New York).

In 1984 Nissman was one of the featured performers at the Dedication of the American Poets' Corner at the Cathedral of St. John the Divine in New York. Walter Cronkite hosted the event that also included appearances by Rosalyn Tureck, Paul Winter, Michael Tree, Zubin Mehta, and readings by the actor Gregory Peck and the poets Robert Penn Warren, Daniel Haberman and Edgar Bowers.

In 1988, Nissman was one of the participants in the "International Celebration of the Piano" held at Carnegie Hall, celebrating Steinway's 135th anniversary.

For the 1996 Kennedy Center 25th Anniversary Gala Concert, broadcast on public television, Nissman performed two numbers arranged for ten pianos, alongside pianists Leonard Slatkin (who also conducted the ensemble), David Buechner, Cy Coleman, Joseph Kalichstein, Peter Nero, David Hyde Pierce, Peter Schickele, Jeffrey Siegel, and Alicia Witt.

Since 2002, Nissman has been involved with the Robert James Frascino AIDS Foundation benefit concert series "A Concerted Effort". To date these concerts have raised well over two million dollars for AIDS service organizations worldwide. In November 2014 she performed at a gala at the de Young Museum in San Francisco to honor Dr. Arthur Ammann, founder of Global Strategies, an organization that serves the healthcare needs of women and children in neglected areas of the world.

In 2007, Nissman appeared on stage with Don Henley and Billy Joel, performing on the "Walden Woods Steinway" in a gala fundraiser for the Walden Woods Project, held at Jazz at Lincoln Center.

In October, 2022, Barbara launched Carnegie Classics, an annual three-concert series at Carnegie Hall in Lewisburg, West Virginia. Barbara combines great music with informal chat to introduce classical masterworks to new audiences, as well as inspiring and entertaining all music lovers.

== Books, Writings and Editions (selected) ==
- Author of Bartók and the Piano: A Performer's View, published by Scarecrow Press with a full-length CD of selected Bartók works performed by the author
- Editor of the Critical Edition of Piano Concerto No. 2 by Alberto Ginastera, published by Boosey & Hawkes in 2016 (also contributed to the editing of Ginastera's Piano Sonata No. 2, Piano Sonata No. 3 and Concierto Argentino, all published by Boosey & Hawkes)
- Contributor to The Pianist's Craft, published by Scarecrow Press and edited by Richard P. Anderson: "Sergei Prokofiev, A Man Misunderstood"
- Contributor to The Pianist's Craft 2, published by Rowman & Littlefield and edited by Richard P. Anderson: "Remembering Alberto Ginastera"
- Contributor to Remembering Horowitz: 125 Pianists Recall a Legend, first published by Schirmer Books and compiled and edited by David Dubal
- Contributor to "Understanding Bartók" symposium in March/April 2014 issue of International Piano magazine (UK)
- Contributor to "Prokofiev's Pianism" symposium in July/August 2013 issue of International Piano magazine (UK)
- Author of "Remembering Ginastera" for Piano Today (cover story)
- Author of "Remembering Alberto Ginastera—a centenary tribute," Musical Opinion, UK (April–June 2016 issue)
- Author of "When Gershwin met Prokofiev" for Piano Today (cover story of Winter 2005 issue); also adapted for Three Oranges Journal (Jan. 2016)
- Author of "The Many Faces of Prokofiev as seen through his Piano Concertos" for Three Oranges Journal (November 2002 issue)
- Additional articles and master classes on Ginastera, Prokofiev, Bartók & Liszt published in Keynote, Keyboard Classics, Piano Today, Musical Opinion (UK), Piano (UK), Musical Times (UK)

== DVD Series ==
- Sergei Prokofiev, "A Man Misunderstood", The Three War Sonatas (1939-1944). Three Oranges Recordings 3OR-33, 2025.

A 2-DVD video set providing an introduction to the War Sonatas, and detailed masterclasses and performances of them; interviews with Gabriel Prokofiev, the composer's grandson; Harlow Robinson, biographer of Prokofiev; and Natalia Savkina, a Prokofiev expert from the Moscow Conservatory.

- Alberto Ginastera, "A Man of Latin America", A Masterclass with Barbara Nissman. Three Oranges Recordings 3OR-30, 2022.

A 2-DVD video set about one of South America's most prominent composers of the twentieth century. Barbara worked with Ginastera and shares her passion for his music in this portrait and master class. Ginastera's final work, the Third Sonata, was written for Barbara, and in the second disc presents a master class on all three sonatas, as well as his earlier popular Danzas Argentinas, and includes complete performances of these masterpieces. Also included are interviews with the composer, his wife and daughter, as well as an interview with conductor Leonard Slatkin about his final orchestral work, the Popol Vuh and interviews with the late Keith Emerson of Emerson, Lake & Palmer and the late jazz pianist Chick Corea.

- Franz Liszt: Portrait of the Man and His Masterwork, the 'Sonata in B minor'. Three Orange Recordings 3OR-21, 2017.

With Michael York as the voice of Liszt, this is the first in a series of master-classes on DVD, written and conceived by Nissman. Also heard as Liszt's contemporaries are Billy Joel (Chopin), Don Henley (Brahms), Harry Connick Jr. (Czerny), Rebecca De Mornay (Clara Schumann), Rosemary Harris (Princess Carolyne Wittgenstein), John Schuck (Wagner), Leonard Slatkin (Schumann), Peter Schickele (Berlioz), David Dubal (Heine), Manfred Honeck (Beethoven, Goethe), Barbara Feldon (George Sand), Stuart Margolin (Carl Lachmund), Bill McGlaughlin (Grieg, Richard Strauss), Miles Chapin (Hans von Bülow) and the voices of Anna Singer, Dennis Rooney, Pete Ballard, Kermit Medsker & Jon Cavendish.The second part focuses on Liszt's masterwork, the B minor Sonata with personal insights into performance and appreciation of this complex work. A concert performance of the Sonata in B minor concludes this 2-DVD set.

== Discography (selected) ==
- Beethoven: Voice of the Future. Piano Sonata No. 22 (Op. 54), No. 24 (Op. 78), No. 26 (Op. 81a; Les Adieux), No. 27 (Op. 90), and No. 28 (Op. 101). Three Oranges Recordings 3OR-32 (2023)
- Beethoven: The Visionary. Piano Sonata No. 15 (Op. 28; Pastorale), No. 17 (Op. 31 No. 2; Tempest), and No. 18 (Op. 31 No. 3; The Hunt). Three Oranges Recordings 3OR-31 (2022)
- Schubert: Voice of a Poet. The Last Sonatas. D.959, D.960. Three Oranges Recordings 3OR-29 (2021)
- Watershed: Orchestral Works by Lynn Emberg Purse. Orchestral works, to include: Watershed, Sketches of America, Arcadian Tone Poems. Duquesne University Symphony Orchestra et al., Daniel Meyer and Sidney Harth, conductors. 3OR-28 (2020)
- Beethoven: The Virtuoso. The Early Sonatas. Piano Sonata No. 3 (Op. 2, No. 3), No. 4 (Op. 7), No. 12 (Op. 26). Three Oranges Recordings 3OR-27 (2020)
- Rachmaninoff, Prokofiev & Ramey. Rachmaninoff Second Piano Sonata (earlier, uncut version), Six Moments Musicaux, Prokofiev Tenth Sonata fragment (1953), plus the first performance of Phillip Ramey's Tenth Piano Sonata, dedicated to Barbara Nissman. Three Oranges Recordings 3OR-26 (2019)
- Chopin: The Nocturnes and Barcarolle & Polonaise in F♯ minor. Three Oranges Recordings 3OR-25 (2017)
- CHOPIN! Sonata in B minor, Berceuse, Four Scherzi. Three Oranges Recordings 3OR-24 (2017)
- Beethoven: The Late Sonatas. Piano Sonata No. 30 (Op. 109), No. 31 (Op. 110) and No. 32 (Op. 111). Three Oranges Recordings 3OR-23 (2017)
- Liszt: The Transcendentals. 12 Etudes, plus Funérailles and Valse Oubliée No. 1 in F♯ minor. Three Oranges Recordings 3OR-22 (2017)
- Fireworks! Brahms Sonata no. 3 in F minor, plus music by Liszt, Scarlatti and Debussy. Three Oranges Recordings 3OR-20 (2014)
- Out of Doors. Bartók Out of Doors, plus music by Schubert, Chopin, Rachmaninoff, Hummel, Mendelssohn and Prokofiev. Three Oranges Recordings 3OR-19 (2014)
- Fascinating Rhythms! Music of Prokofiev, Schumann, Chopin, Benjamin Lees, Albéniz, Ginastera and Gershwin. Three Oranges Recordings 3OR-18 (reissue of Pierian 0046) (2014)
- Not TOO serious... Beethoven's Diabelli Variations, plus music of Bartók, Liszt and Prokofiev. Three Oranges Recordings 3OR-17 (reissue of Pierian 0045) (2014)
- Romantic Tales. Music of Chopin, Ravel, Prokofiev, Buxtehude (arr. Prokofiev), Scriabin, Mendelssohn, Schumann and Rachmaninoff. Three Oranges Recordings 3OR-16 (reissue of Pierian 0043) (2014)
- Love & War. Prokofiev's Sonata no. 6, plus music of Liszt, Benjamin Lees, Bartók and Chopin. Three Oranges Recordings 3OR-15 (reissue of Pierian 0041) (2014)
- Journeys of the Soul. Music of Bach, Ravel, Liszt, Scriabin and Balakirev. Three Oranges Recordings 3OR-14 (reissue of Pierian 0038) (2014)
- Triumph! Beethoven "Hammerklavier", plus music of Bach, Liszt and Prokofiev. Three Oranges Recordings 3OR-13 (reissue of Pierian 0037) (2014)
- Glory in the Highest! Music of Bach-Busoni, Barber, Franck, Beethoven, Granados, Ginastera and Debussy. Three Oranges Recordings 3OR-12 (reissue of Pierian 0036) (2014)
- Dramatic Visions. Music of Beethoven, Prokofiev, Schubert, Wagner, Liszt and Chopin. Three Oranges Recordings 3OR-11 (reissue of Pierian 0035) (2014)
- Love & Loss, Volume II: Music of Rachmaninoff. Études-Tableaux Op. 33 & 39, plus other pieces. Three Oranges Recordings 3OR-10 (reissue of Pierian 0031) (2014)
- Love & Loss, Volume I: Music of Rachmaninoff. Preludes Op. 23 & 32. Three Oranges Recordings 3OR-09 (reissue of Pierian 0028) (2014)
- A Noble Heart: Music of Johannes Brahms. Sonata no. 2 in F♯ minor, plus other works. Three Oranges Recordings 3OR-08 (reissue of Pierian 0027) (2014)
- The Storyteller: Music of Robert Schumann. Kreisleriana, Fantasy, plus other works. Three Oranges Recordings 3OR-07 (reissue of Pierian 0025) (2014)
- Longing...Music of Frederic Chopin. Polonaise-Fantasy, plus other works. Three Oranges Recordings 3OR-06 (reissue of Pierian 0019) (2014)
- Visions: Sonatas of Beethoven, Vol. I. Waldstein, Moonlight, and Appassionata sonatas, plus Rondo op. 129. Three Oranges Recordings 3OR-05 (reissue of Pierian 0020) (2014)
- Folk Music & More: Music of Béla Bartók. Sonata (1898), plus other works. Three Oranges Recordings 3OR-04 (reissue of Pierian 0016) (2014)
- Superstar! Music of Franz Liszt. Sonata in B minor and other works. Three Oranges Recordings 3OR-03 (reissue of Pierian 0015) (2014)
- Prokofiev by Nissman: The Complete Sonatas. Sonatas 1-10 (both versions of no. 5); Four Pieces, Op. 4; Toccata; Sarcasms; Visions Fugitives. Three Oranges Recordings 3OR-02 (reissue of Pierian 0007/8/9) (2014)
- Alberto Ginastera: The Complete Music for Piano & Piano/Chamber Ensembles. Sonatas 1–3, Danzas Argentinas, Tres Piezas, Malambo, plus other works. Three Oranges Recordings 3OR-01 (reissue of Pierian 0005/6) (2014)
- Nissman Plays Ginastera: The Three Piano Concertos. Barbara Nissman, piano; Kenneth Kiesler, conductor; University of Michigan Symphony Orchestra. Pierian 0048 (2012)
- Recital Favorites by Nissman Volume 8. Music of Prokofiev, Schumann, Chopin, Benjamin Lees, Albéniz, Ginastera and Gershwin. Pierian 0046 (2011)
- Recital Favorites by Nissman Volume 7. Beethoven's Diabelli Variations, plus music of Bartók, Liszt and Prokofiev. Pierian 0045 (2011)
- Recital Favorites by Nissman Volume 6. Music of Chopin, Ravel, Prokofiev, Buxtehude (arr. Prokofiev), Scriabin, Mendelssohn, Schumann and Rachmaninoff. Pierian 0043 (2011)
- Recital Favorites by Nissman Volume 5. Prokofiev's Sonata no. 6, plus music of Liszt, Benjamin Lees, Bartók and Chopin. Pierian 0041 (2010)
- Recital Favorites by Nissman Volume 4. Music of Bach, Ravel, Liszt, Scriabin and Balakirev. Pierian 0038 (2009)
- Recital Favorites by Nissman Volume 3. Beethoven "Hammerklavier", plus music of Bach, Liszt and Prokofiev. Pierian 0037 (2009)
- Recital Favorites by Nissman Volume 2. Music of Bach-Busoni, Barber, Franck, Beethoven, Granados, Ginastera and Debussy. Pierian 0036 (2008)
- Recital Favorites by Nissman Volume 1. Music of Beethoven, Prokofiev, Schubert, Wagner, Liszt and Chopin. Pierian 0035 (2008)
- Rachmaninoff by Nissman: Volume 2. The Etudes, Op. 33, Op. 39, plus three Transcriptions. Pierian 0031 (2007)
- Rachmaninoff by Nissman Volume 1. The Preludes, Op. 3, No. 2; Op. 23; Op. 32. Pierian 0028 (2006)
- Brahms by Nissman. Sonata no. 2 in F♯ minor, plus other works. Pierian 0027 (2005)
- Schumann by Nissman. Kreisleriana, Fantasy, plus other works. Pierian 0025 (2005)
- Beethoven by Nissman. Waldstein, Moonlight, and Appassionata sonatas, plus Rondo op. 129. Pierian 0020 (2003)
- Chopin by Nissman. Polonaise-Fantasy, plus other works. (CD) Pierian 0019 (2003)
- Bartók by Nissman. Sonata (1898), plus other works. Pierian 0016 (2003)
- Liszt by Nissman. Sonata in B minor and other works. Pierian 0015 (2002)
- Alberto Ginastera—The Complete Music for Piano & Piano Chamber Ensembles. (2-CD set) Pierian 0005/6 (reissue of Newport Classic NPD 85510 & 85511; licensed from Sony Music Entertainment) (2001)
- Prokofiev by Nissman: The Complete Sonatas. (3-CD set) Pierian 007/8/9 (reissue of Newport Classic NCD 6009/3/4; licensed from Sony Music Entertainment) (2001)
- Franz Liszt: The Sonata in B minor and other works for solo piano. Newport Classic NPD 85538 (1993)
- Malambo- Alberto Ginastera: The Complete Music for Piano & Piano Chamber Ensembles, Volume II. Barbara Nissman, piano; Aurora Natola-Ginastera, cello; Ruben Gonzalez, violin; The Laurentian String Quartet. Newport Classic NPD85511 (1992)
- Criolla- Alberto Ginastera: The Complete Music for Piano & Piano Chamber Ensembles, Volume 1. Newport Classic NPD 85510 (1991)
- Sergei Prokofiev- Complete Piano Sonatas- Volume III. Sonatas 9 & 10; Four Pieces, Op. 4; Toccata; Sarcasms; Visions Fugitives. (CD; analytically indexed disc) Newport Classic NCD 60094 (1989)
- Sergei Prokofiev- Complete Piano Sonatas- Volume II. Sonatas 6–8. (CD; analytically indexed disc) Newport Classic NCD 60093 (1989)
- Sergei Prokofiev- Complete Piano Sonatas- Volume I. Sonatas 1–4; both versions of No. 5. (CD; analytically indexed disc) Newport Classic NCD 60092 (1989)
- Alberto Ginastera, Piano Music. (LP; American release of 1981 CBS 71107 recording) Desto DC 7229 (1984)
- Franz Liszt: 6 Paganini Etudes; 3 Concert Etudes; Rhapsodie Espagnole. (LP) Globe Records GLOCX15003 (1982-Holland)
- Barbara Nissman plays Ginastera. (LP) Sonata No. 1; Danzas Argentinas; 12 American Preludes; Rondo; Danzas Criollas. CBS 71107 (1981-Holland)
