= Ponthus =

Ponthus is a surname. Notable people with the surname include:

- Joseph Ponthus (1978–2021), French writer
- Marc Ponthus, French pianist
- Sandra Ponthus (born 1976), French diver

See also:

- Antoine Claude Ponthus-Cinier (1812–1885), French painter

As a given name:

- Ponthus Westerholm (born 1992), Swedish ice hockey player
