= Daniel Haberman =

American poet

Daniel Haberman (1933–1991) was an American poet, translator and graphic designer. Haberman was instrumental in founding the American Poets' Corner at the Cathedral of St. John the Divine in New York City and was the cathedral's first Poet-in-Residence, from 1983 to 1986. In 1988 he and his wife, pianist Barbara Nissman, moved from New York to a farm in the Allegheny Mountains of West Virginia, where he lived until his death.

== Early life and education ==
Haberman was born in New York City in 1933, the son of Benjamin Haberman, a typesetter, and his wife Sadie (Daisee) Ballin. He attended the Walden School, Carnegie Mellon University, and the graduate school of New York University. He was educated in the second-hand bookshops of Manhattan and by two years of study with Edward Dahlberg.

== Poet ==
Haberman published two volumes of poetry in his lifetime, Poems (Art Direction Book, 1977; 2nd edition, 1982) and The Furtive Wall (Art Direction Book, 1982), the latter with etchings by Jan Stussy. A collection of his verse, The Lug of Days to Come (John Daniel and Company, 1996) was released posthumously.

Three of Haberman's poems ("Morning on the Orient Express," "The Sky in an Auburn Haze," and an untitled poem) appeared in the Spring 1984 issue of Southern Review.

Composer Irina Dubkova wrote a song-cycle titled The Lug of Days to Come, setting to music six of Haberman's poems.

== Translator ==
Haberman's translations of Archilochus, Erinna, Praxilla, Antipater of Sidon, Zenobius, and Gaetulicus were done in collaboration with Marylin B. Arthur. Their translation of "Erinna's Lament to Baucis" was published in 1993 in The Norton Book of Classical Literature, edited by Bernard Knox, and in The Greek Poets: Homer to the Present, published in 2009 by Norton and edited by Peter Constantine, Rachel Hadas, Edmund Keeley & Karen Van Dyck.

== Graphic designer ==
Haberman designed 16 editions of Shakespeare: Antony and Cleopatra, As You Like It, Hamlet, Parts I and II of King Henry IV, The Life of Henry V, Julius Cæsar, King Lear, Macbeth, A Midsummer Night's Dream, Othello, King Richard II, Romeo and Juliet, The Sonnets, The Taming of the Shrew, The Tempest and Timon of Athens. His edition of The Tempest (Composing Room & Graphic Arts Typographers, New York, 1971) was named by the American Institute of Graphic Arts as one of the fifty best books of 1972.

== American Poets' Corner ==
In 1983 Haberman was asked to create an American Poets' Corner at the Cathedral of St. John the Divine in New York, and was the cathedral's first Poet-in-Residence. He personally raised $20,000 for the engraving of the wall and monuments to the first writers elected for induction (Emily Dickinson, Walt Whitman, and Washington Irving).

The "Service of Dedication" of the American Poets' Corner took place on May 7, 1984, and featured such diverse talents as Edgar Bowers, Walter Cronkite, Zubin Mehta, Barbara Nissman, Gregory Peck, Michael Tree, Rosalyn Tureck, Robert Penn Warren, and Paul Winter.

While serving as Poet-in Residence, Haberman drew up the original set of 13 Electors to the Poets' Corner, inviting the poets Daniel Aaron, Edgar Bowers, Joseph Brodsky, J.V. Cunningham, Guy Davenport, Anthony Hecht, John Hollander, Josephine Miles, Ann Stanford, Robert Penn Warren, Eudora Welty, and Richard Wilbur to be part of the voting to select two American poets to be honored every year. Marie (Mrs. Hugh) Bullock, founder/president of the Academy of American Poets, accepted the position of honorary chairman; Lyn (Mrs. Edward T.) Chase, a vice president of the academy and a trustee of the cathedral, became an elector ex officio.

Haberman was succeeded as Poet-in-Residence in May 1986 by William Jay Smith, and continued to serve as an Elector of the American Poets' Corner until his death in 1991.
