= Popol Vuh (Ginastera) =

Symphonic poem by Alberto Ginastera

Popol Vuh: The Creation of the Mayan World, Op. 44, is a symphonic poem in seven movements by the Argentine composer Alberto Ginastera. The work, which remains unfinished, was composed between 1975 and 1983. It was first performed by the St. Louis Symphony under the direction of Leonard Slatkin at Powell Hall in St. Louis on April 7, 1989.

== Composition ==
=== Background ===
Popol Vuh was originally commissioned by the Philadelphia Orchestra under the conductor Eugene Ormandy in 1975. Ginastera based the music on the eponymous Mayan creation myth of the Popol Vuh. Though Ginastera had intended to write a total of eight movements for the piece, the composer died suddenly in June 1983, having completed only seven sections of the work. The Philadelphia Orchestra thus declined to premiere the unfinished composition. Ormandy himself died in 1985 and the score remained nearly forgotten among Ginastera's papers until his friend the pianist Barbara Nissman brought it to the attention of Leonard Slatkin, then director of the St. Louis Symphony. Popol Vuh was thus given its world premiere on April 7, 1989—nearly six years after Ginastera's death. Although it is generally agreed that the unwritten movement would have been a percussion-only finale, Slatkin speculated before the premiere that it might have been the penultimate movement and that the current finale is indeed how Ginastera intended to conclude the piece.

=== Structure ===
Popol Vuh has a duration of approximately 25 minutes and is cast in seven short movements:

1. La Noche de los Tiempos
2. El Nacimiento de la Tierra
3. El Despertar de la Naturaleza
4. El Grito de la Creacion
5. La Gran Lluvia
6. La Ceremonia Magica del Maiz
7. El Sol, la Luna y las Estrellas

=== Instrumentation ===
The work is scored for a large orchestra consisting of three flutes (2nd and 3rd doubling piccolo), three oboes (3rd doubling cor anglais), three clarinets (2nd doubling E♭ clarinet; 3rd doubling bass clarinet), three bassoons (3rd doubling contrabassoon), four horns, four trumpets, four trombones, tuba, timpani, four percussionists, two harps, piano (doubling celesta), and strings.

== Reception ==
Reviewing the world premiere, Michael Kimmelman of The New York Times gave Popol Vuh modest praise, remarking, "The piece offered enough coloristic charm, at least in this boisterous rendition, to sustain a listener's attention through the nearly 30-minute duration." Andrew Clements of The Guardian observed, "As a torso it is still impressively coherent, though, in a style that leans heavily on the 'primitivism' of Stravinsky and Bartók, with textures dominated by a huge range of exotic percussion." Elise Seifert of WHQR similarly praised it: "Popol Vuh stands out in the spectrum of twentieth century music."

However, Michael Oliver of Gramophone described it as "a disappointing piece." Despite noting its "vivid, subtle or mysterious sonorities," Oliver wrote, "Its six [sic] mostly brief movements are spasmodic rather than cumulative, the overall effect being of unrelated events that might just as well be played in a different order; my guess would be that Ginastera simply got bogged down in the piece."
