= Irina Dubkova =

Russian composer

Irina Dubkova (Russian: Дубкова Ирина Анатольевна) is a Russian composer, music teacher and an associate professor at the Moscow Conservatory.

== Life ==
Irina Dubkova was born in Sverdlovsk (Yekaterinburg).

She began composing at the age of five. After finishing music college as a pianist in 1982, she completed the undergraduate course as a composer. She continued the same way her post-graduate studies with professor Roman Ledenyov and in musicology with Yuri Kholopov until 1987.

Dubkova has participated in many competitions and festivals. In 1980 she was the winner at the Moscow International Young Composer's Competition, with Four Romances to the verses of Sergei Yesenin for baritone and piano; in 1982 she won again with her Symphony No. 1 and in 1985 with a vocal cycle for children. In 1987 her «Allegro» for Symphony Orchestra was awarded.

From 1982 to 1985 Dubkova worked as a music editor at the USSR State Radio and TV Company. In 1984 she became a member of the Russian Composers' Union, the International Music Society «Amadeus» and the Russian Association for Piano Duets (Russian Music Society).

== Teaching ==
From 1996, Dubkova has been teaching at the Composition Department of the Moscow Tchaikovsky Conservatory. In 2007 she became an associated professor.

== Works ==
Dubkova's compositions have been performed regularly at the annual festivals «Earino Musical Festival», «The Universe of Sound», «Nihon-no Kokoro» and «Moscow Meetings».

In 1980, when she was still a student of the Moscow Conservatory, she began participating at an annual music festival «Moscow Autumn». Since that time a lot of her new compositions got their first performances during this festival.

Dubkova's symphony, chamber and choral music have been heard in the entire Russia and in the whole world. Her music was played in Berlin, Hameln, Basel, Nice, Paris, Vienna, Gent, Helsinki, Boston, Iowa, Thessalonica, Tilburg, Goirle, Tallinn, Tartu, Kiev, St. Petersburg, Ekaterinburg, Bryansk, Novgorod, Kaluga, Yaroslavl, Ulan-Ude, Smolensk, Pskov, Vitebsk, and Moscow.

She has worked with such famous conductors as Veronika Dudarova, Vladimir Pon'kin, Martyn Nersesian, Dimitri Orlov, Stanislav Dyachenko and Iohannes Hemberg (Germany).

Among foreign musicians who Dubkova has worked and still maintains contacts with are Elen Metlov-Grabovska (France), Kurt Widmer (Switzerland), John Muriello (USA), David Gompper (USA), Katherine Eberly Fink (USA), Yun Pai Hsu (Taiwan), Vladimir Zhmurko (Israel), Anna Chatzisimeonidou (Greece), Peep Lassmann (Estonia), Regina Himmelbauer (Austria) and others. Dubkova also plays in different concerts as a pianist.

=== For symphony orchestra ===
- Symphony I (1982)
- Symphony II (1990)
- Concerto for piano and symphony orchestra (1990)
- Allegro for symphony orchestra (1987)
- Concert Pieces for symphony orchestra (1988)

=== For theatre ===
- Ballet Danko in 6 parts (1980)
- Everyone to Whom I Am Responsible», opera for baritone, bass, reader and two pianos to the texts of Antoine de Saint-Exupéry (2002)

=== Chamber music ===
- String Quartet I in 3 parts (1984)
- String Quartet II in 4 parts (2000)
- Quartet for clarinets in 4 parts (1988)
- Trio for piano, viola and cello (1989)
- Bagatelles for violin and piano (1998)
- In the Soft Moonlight for flute, clarinet, violin, cello and piano (2001)

=== For piano ===
- Two Concert Pieces for two pianos (1982)
- Character Sketches, piano suite for two pianos (1982)
- Piano Sonata No. 1 in 4 parts (1990)
- Eesti Laulud, piano suite in 9 parts (1991)
- Bagatelles for two pianos (1992)
- Slavic, triptich for piano (1993)
- Piano Sonata No. 2 (2001)
- Dialogues for two pianos ( 2004)
- Piano Sonata No. 3 (2005)

=== For organ ===
- Vitrages, cycle for organ (2003)
- Celebration Music for the Birthday of the Emperor of Japan Mr. Akihito for organ and percussion (2003)
- Semiramida's Gardens for organ (2005)

=== For choir ===
- Ich will dir mein Herze schenken..., concerto for soloist, mixed choir, string orchestra and piano, to the text of St. Matthew (1995)
- Songs of the Earth, concerto for mixed choir a cappella, to the poems of Mikhail Lermontov (1993)
- The Light that Never Sets, choral cycle to the poems of Ivan Bunin, a cappella (1994)
- Five Choruses Without Words, for mixed choir a cappella (1991)
- Ave Maria for mixed choir a cappella (1997)
- Three Choruses for women`s chorus a cappella to the texts of Andrei Voznesensky (2005)
- The Small Christmas Cantata for mixed chorus and organ (2006)

=== Vocal compositions ===
- Four Romances to poems by Sergei Yesenin for baritone and piano (1980)
- Harps and Violins, five arias to poems of Alexander Blok for baritone and piano (1985)
- Five Arias to the poems of Russian poets (1982)
- Ten Arias to the poems of Alexander Pushkin for baritone and piano (1986)
- Three Romances to the poems of Nikolay Rubtsov for bass and symphony orchestra (1988)
- Reveries, vocal cycle to the French poems of Fyodor Tyutchev for soprano, mezzo-soprano and piano (1992)
- A Song from Songs, seven arias to the folk texts for soprano, mezzo-soprano and piano (1993)
- The Lug of Days to Come, vocal cycle on the texts of Daniel Haberman for baritone and piano (1999)

=== For children ===
- The vocal cycle to the texts of Samuil Marshak (1984)
- A piano cycle for little children (1993)
- Efteling, instrumental suite (1998)
- Children's Suite for piano (2000)
- The Musical Rainbow», suite for piano (2001)

== Discography ==
From 1980 she has much recorded with the State Radio and TV Company as a pianist. She also released two CDs of her own compositions.
