= Lamentaciones de Jeremias Propheta =

Lamentaciones de Jeremías Propheta (or Hieremiae Prophetae Lamentationes) is a choral work composed in 1946 by Alberto Ginastera while residing in the US on a Fulbright grant.

Rather than setting the lessons as prescribed by the liturgy of Tenebrae, the Latin text is freely selected from the Book of Lamentations. Lasting about ten minutes, the work is in three movements: O vos omnes, Ego vir videns and Recordare, Domine, drawn respectively from chapters 1, 3 & 5.
