= Affiliate Artists =

Performing arts organization

Affiliate Artists was a U.S. nonprofit performing arts organization active from 1965 to the 1990s and headquartered in New York City. Instead of conventional competition prizes, Affiliate Artists offered the performing artists that were chosen through its auditions and competitions residencies and performances that placed them in communities for more than single appearances.

Of particular note were the Affiliate Artists Xerox Pianist Program, Texaco Affiliate Artist program, and Exxon-Arts Endowment Conductors Program. In each cycle of auditions, winners were not ranked. In 1989, The New York Times wrote: "If the winners of last February's Xerox Pianists competition had received an Olympic medal for their efforts, it would have been an alloy - gold, silver, bronze, etc., all mixed together. Affiliate Artists, the program's parent organization, is interested in providing opportunities rather than rankings. More than 200 pianists applied, 23 semifinalists were chosen and the five winners taken from them. Contestants played recitals and concertos (with the Rochester Philharmonic). In addition to performing, the contestants had to talk to their four judges."

Partial list of Affiliate Artists winners:

- Bruce Brubaker, piano
- Myung-whun Chung, conductor
- Andrew Litton, conductor
- Stephen Drury, piano
- Jeffrey Kahane, piano
- Kent Nagano, conductor
- Christopher O'Riley, piano
- Marc Ponthus, piano
- Hugh Wolff, conductor
