= Alberto Ginastera =

Argentine composer (1916–1983)

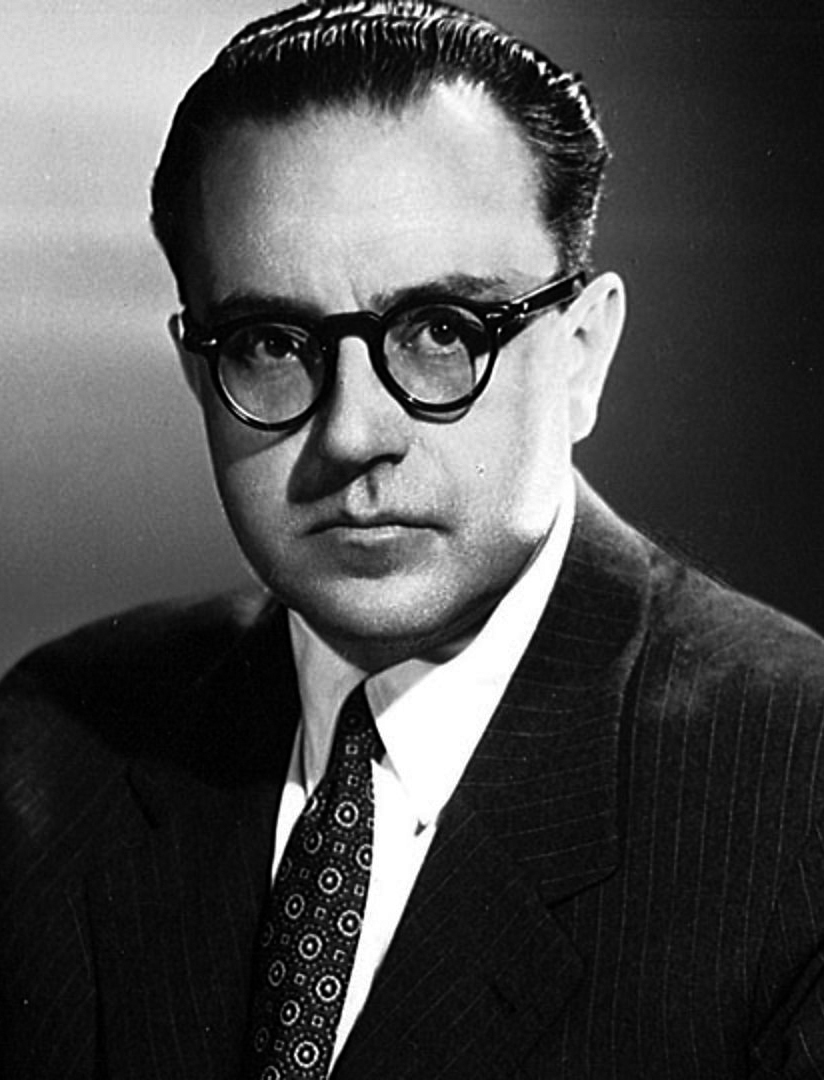
- Born: Alberto Evaristo Ginastera; April 11, 1916; Buenos Aires, Argentina
- Died: June 25, 1983 (aged 67); Geneva, Switzerland
- Era: 20th Century

Signature
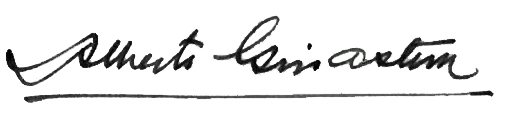

Alberto Evaristo Ginastera (Catalan pronunciation: [alˈβeɾto eβaˈɾisto dʒinaˈsteɾa]; April 11, 1916 – June 25, 1983) was an Argentine composer of classical music. He is considered to be one of the most important 20th-century classical composers of the Americas.

== Biography ==
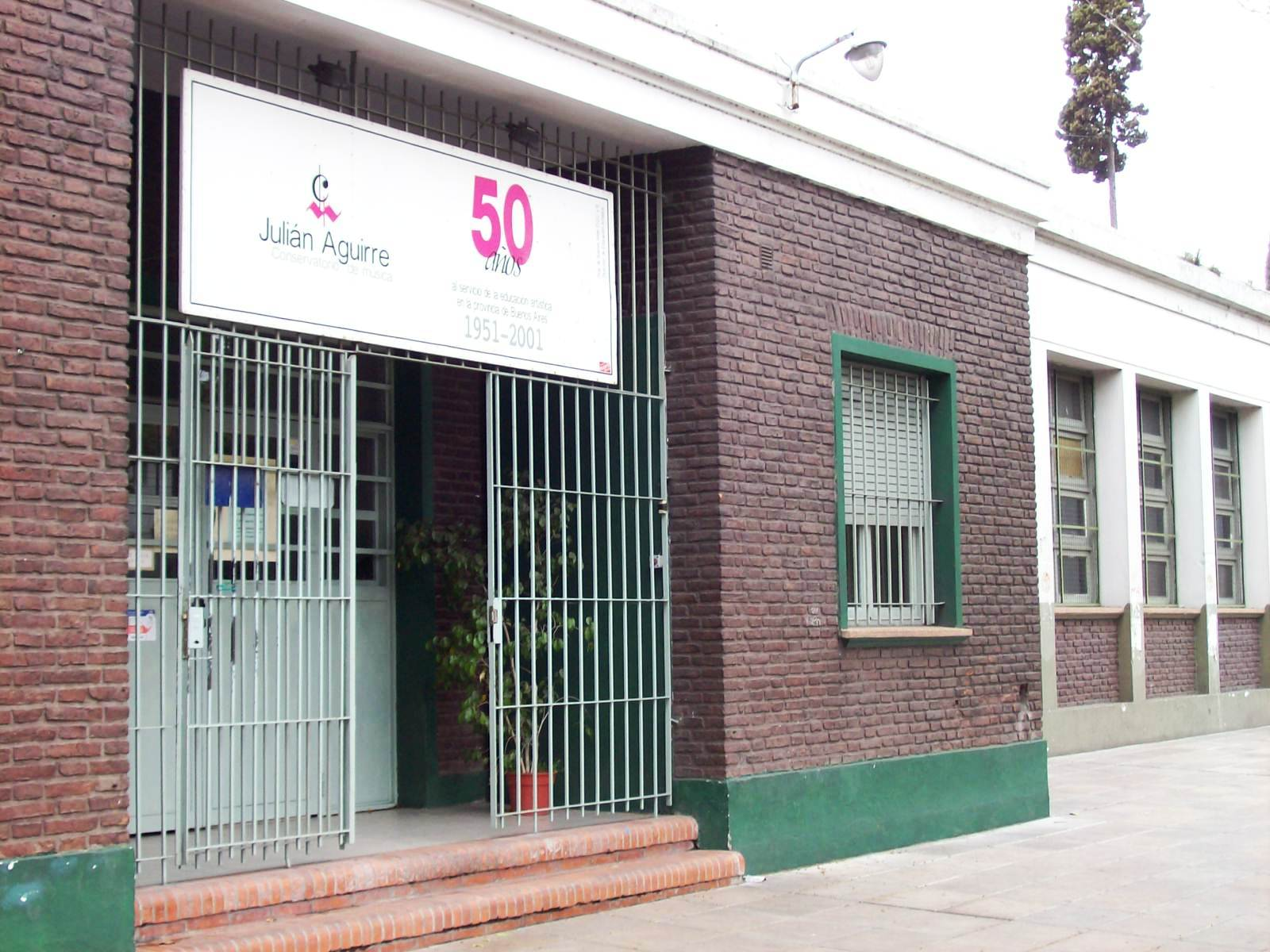
Julián Aguirre Conservatory of Music, founded by Ginastera in 1951

Ginastera was born in Buenos Aires to a Spanish father and an Italian mother. During his later years, he preferred to use the Catalan and Italian pronunciation of his surname – IPA: [dʒinaˈsteːra], with an initial soft 'G' like that of English 'George' – rather than with a Spanish 'J' sound (IPA: [xinaˈsteɾa]).

Ginastera studied at the Williams Conservatory in Buenos Aires, graduating in 1938. As a young professor, he taught at the Liceo Militar General San Martín. After a visit to the United States in 1945–47, where he studied with Aaron Copland at Tanglewood, he returned to Buenos Aires. He held a number of teaching posts. Among his notable students were Ástor Piazzolla (who studied with him in 1941), Alcides Lanza, Jorge Antunes, Waldo de los Ríos, Jacqueline Nova, Blas Atehortua, Rafael Aponte-Ledée. (See: List of music students by teacher: G to J#Alberto Ginastera.)

In 1968 Ginastera moved back to the United States, and in 1970 to Europe. He died in Geneva, Switzerland, at the age of 67 and was buried in the Cimetière des Rois in the Plainpalais district.

== Music ==
Ginastera grouped his music into three periods: "Objective Nationalism" (1934–1948), "Subjective Nationalism" (1948–1958), and "Neo-Expressionism" (1958–1983). Among other distinguishing features, these periods vary in their use of traditional Argentine musical elements. His Objective Nationalistic works often integrate Argentine folk themes in a straightforward fashion, while works in the later periods incorporate traditional elements in increasingly abstracted forms.

Many of Ginastera's works were inspired by the Gauchesco tradition. This tradition holds that the gaucho, or landless native horseman of the plains, is a symbol of Argentina.

His Cantata para América Mágica (1960), for dramatic soprano and 53 percussion instruments, was based on ancient pre-Columbian legends. Its U.S. West Coast premiere was performed by the Los Angeles Percussion Ensemble under Henri Temianka and William Kraft at UCLA in 1963.

== Works ==
=== Opera ===
- Don Rodrigo, Op. 31 (1963–64)
- Bomarzo, Op. 34 (1966–67), banned in Argentina until 1972
- Beatrix Cenci, Op. 38 (1971), based on the play The Cenci (1819) by Percy Bysshe Shelley

=== Ballet ===
- Panambí, Op. 1 (1935)
- Estancia, Op. 8 (1941)

=== Orchestra ===
- Suite from Panambí, Op. 1a (1937)
- Dances from Estancia, Op. 8a (1943)
- Obertura para el "Fausto" criollo, Op. 9 (1943)
- Ollantay: 3 Symphonic Movements, Op. 17 (1947)
- Variaciones concertantes, Op. 23 (1953)
- Pampeana No. 3 (also Symphony No. 3), Op. 24 (1954)
- Concerto per corde, Op. 33 (1965)
- Estudios Sinfonicos, Op. 35 (1967)
- Popol Vuh, Op. 44 (1975–1983, left incomplete at the composer's death)
- Glosses sobre temes de Pau Casals for string orchestra, Op. 46 (1976)
- Glosses sobre temes de Pau Casals for full orchestra, Op. 48 (1976–77)
- Iubilum, Op. 51 (1979–80)

=== Concertante ===
- Piano
  - Piano Concerto No. 1, Op. 28 (1961)
  - Piano Concerto No. 2, Op. 39 (1972)
- Violin
  - Violin Concerto, Op. 30 (1963)
- Cello
  - Cello Concerto No. 1, Op. 36 (1968)
  - Cello Concerto No. 2, Op. 50 (1980–81)
- Harp
  - Harp Concerto, Op. 25 (1956–65)

=== Chamber/Instrumental ===
- Duo, for flute and oboe, Op. 13 (1945)
- Pampeana No. 1, for violin and piano, Op. 16 (1947)
- String Quartet No. 1, Op. 20 (1948)
- Pampeana No. 2, for violoncello and piano, Op. 21 (1950)
- String Quartet No. 2, Op. 26 (1958, Rev. 1968)
- Piano Quintet, Op. 29 (1963)
- String Quartet No. 3, for soprano and string quartet, Op. 40 (1973)
- Puneña No. 1, for flute, Op. 41 (1973, left incomplete at the time of the composer's death)
- Puneña No. 2 ("Hommage à Paul Sacher"), for violoncello, Op. 45 (1976)
- Sonata for guitar, Op. 47 (1976, Rev. 1981)
- Sonata for cello and piano, Op. 49 (1979)
- Fanfare for four trumpets, op. 51a (1980)

=== Piano ===
- Danzas argentinas, Op. 2 (1937)
- Tres piezas, Op. 6 (1940)
- Malambo, Op. 7 ( 1940)
- "Pequena Danza" (from the ballet Estancia, Op. 8) (1941)
- 12 Preludios americanos, Op. 12 (1944)
- Suite de danzas criollas, Op. 15 (1946, rev. 1956)
- Rondó sobre temas infantiles argentinos, Op. 19 (1947)
- Piano Sonata No. 1, Op. 22 (1952)
- Arrangement of an Organ Toccata by Domenico Zipoli (1970)
- Piano Sonata No. 2, Op. 53 (1981)
- Piano Sonata No. 3, Op. 54 (1982)
- Danzas argentinas para los ninos (Unfinished)
  1. Moderato: para Alex
  2. Paisaje: para Georgina

=== Organ ===
- Toccata, Villancico y Fuga, Op. 18 (1947)
- Variazioni e Toccata sopra Aurora lucis rutilat, Op. 52 (1980), dedicated to W. Stuart Pope (president of Boosey & Hawkes), premiered by Marilyn Mason at the 1980 national convention of the AGO in Minneapolis.

=== Vocal/Choral ===
- 2 Songs, for voice and piano, Op. 3 (1938)
- Cantos del Tucumán, for voice, flute, harp, percussion, and violin, Op. 4 (1938)
- Psalm 150, for mixed choir, children's choir and orchestra, Op. 5 (1938)
- 5 canciones populares argentinas, for voice and piano, Op. 10 (1943)
- Las horas de una estancia, for voice and piano, Op. 11 (1943)
- Lamentaciones de Jeremias Propheta, for chorus, Op. 14 (1946)
- Cantata para América mágica, for dramatic soprano and percussion orchestra, Op. 27 (1960)
- Cantata Bomarzo, for soloists, narrator, and chamber orchestra, Op. 32 (1964)
- Milena, for soprano and orchestra, Op. 37 (1971)
- Serenata, for baritone, violoncello, wind quintet, percussion, harp, and double bass, Op. 42 (1973)
- Turbae ad passionem gregorianam, for soloists, chorus, boy's chorus and orchestra, Op. 43 (1975)
- Canción del beso robado, for voice and piano (19??)

=== Works withdrawn by the composer (without opus number) ===
- Piezas Infantiles, for piano (1934)
- Impresiones de la Puna, for flute and string quartet (1934)
- Concierto argentino, for piano and orchestra (1936)
- El arriero canta, for chorus (1937)
- Sonatina, for harp (1938)
- Symphony No. 1 ("Porteña") (1942)
- Symphony No. 2 ("Elegiaca") (1944, withdrawn but published in 1951)

=== Incidental/film music ===
- Don Basilio malcasado (1940)
- Doña Clorinda la descontenta (1941)
- Malambo (1942)
- Rosa de América (1945)
- Las antiguas semillas (1947)
- Nace la libertad (1949)
- El puente (1950)
- Facundo, el tigre de los llanos (1952)
- Caballito criollo (1953)
- Su seguro servidor (1954)
- Los maridos de mamá (1956)
- Enigma de mujer (1956)
- Spring of Life (1957)
- Hay que bañar al nene (1958)
- El límite (1958)
- A María del corazón (1960)
- La doncella prodigiosa (1961)

== Discography ==
- Bomarzo, The Opera Society of Washington, Julius Rudel, conductor; 1967 recording re-released on Sony Classical in 2016.
- Cantata para América Mágica, Raquel Adonaylo, soprano; Los Angeles Percussion Ensemble, William Kraft, conductor. With: Carlos Chávez, Toccata for Percussion, Henri Temianka, conductor. LP recording, analog, 33 1/3 rpm, stereo, 12 in (300 mm) Columbia Masterworks MS 6447. New York: Columbia Records, 1963.
- Cantata para America Magica, McGill Percussion Ensemble, P. Béluse, director, Elise Bédard, soprano, McGill Records CD, 1997.
- Complete works for piano, Andrzej Pikul (piano), Dux Recording Producers, 2007.
- Quartet No. 1, Paganini Quartet, Decca Gold Label.
- Art Songs of Latin-America, Patricia Caicedo, soprano & Pau Casan, piano – Albert Moraleda Records, Barcelona, 2001 – Cinco canciones populares argentinas by Ginastera & Canción al árbol del olvido
- 2007 – Flores Argentinas: Canciones de Ginastera y Guastavino / Inca Rose Duo: Annelise Skovmand, voice; Pablo González Jazey, guitar. Cleo Productions, Cleo Prod 1002. Arrangements by González Jazey for voice and guitar of: Cinco canciones populares argentinas Op. 10 and Dos canciones Op. 3.
- Arrangement of Piano Concerto No. 1; fourth movement; as "Toccata", Emerson, Lake & Palmer, Brain Salad Surgery, 1973.
- Nissman Plays Ginastera: The Three Piano Concertos. Barbara Nissman, piano; Kenneth Kiesler, conductor; University of Michigan Symphony Orchestra. (CD) Pierian 0048 (2012)
- Complete piano solo and piano/chamber works, Barbara Nissman (piano) with Aurora Natola-Ginastera (cello), Ruben Gonzales (violin) and the Laurentian String Quartet. Three Oranges Recordings (3OR-01)
- Alberto Ginastera, "A Man of Latin America", A Masterclass with Barbara Nissman. Three Oranges Recordings (3OR-30)
- Popol Vuh – The Mayan Creation, Estancia, Panambi, Suite de Danzas Criollas (world premiere of orchestral version), Ollantay. Gisele Ben-Dor, conductor. London Symphony Orchestra, Jerusalem Symphony Orchestra, BBC National Orchestra of Wales. Naxos, 2010.
- Panambi, Estancia (complete Ballets), Gisele Ben-Dor, conductor. Luis Gaeta, narrator/bass baritone. London Symphony Orchestra. Naxos, 1998&2006.
- Glosses on Themes of Pablo Casals, Variaciones concertantes. Gisele Ben-Dor, conductor. London Symphony Orchestra. Israel Chamber Orchestra. Naxos 1995&2010.
- John Antill: Corroboree ballet suite and Ginastera: Panambi ballet suite, London Symphony Orchestra, Sir Eugene Goossens, conductor, Everest stereo LP, SDBR 3003
- String Quartets – "Ginastera: String Quartets," Cuarteto Latinoamericano, with Claudia Montiel, soprano [Elan 82270]
- Piano Concerto No. 1 and Piano Sonata No. 1, Hilde Somer, piano; Ernst Märzendorfer, conductor; Vienna Philharmonia Orchestra; Desto (D-402/DS-6402)
- 2022 – Eclipse Deutsche Grammophon, 4862383. Hilary Hahn violin with Andrés Orozco-Estrada and the Frankfurt Radio Symphony, various composers.
- Ginastera: String Quartets, Miró Quartet (with soprano Kiera Duffy on Quartet No. 3) – Pentatone, 2025
