= Cinco canciones populares argentinas =

Set of five songs by Alberto Ginastera

Cinco canciones populares argentinas are a set of five songs for voice and piano, comprising both entirely new compositions as well as new settings of existing melodies, written in 1943 by Argentine composer Alberto Ginastera as his opus 10. The five songs are as follows:

1. Chacarera
2. Triste
3. Zamba
4. Arrorró
5. Gato

== Historical background ==
In Argentina, the militant revolutionary activity of the late 1930s and early 1940s solidified the power of politicians who, according to Aaron Copland, placed musical policy entirely in the hands of "a small group of conservative musicians" (Aaron Copland, "The Composers of South America," Modern Music vol. 19 (February 1942) 77). During this period, Alberto Ginastera allied himself with Argentine intellectuals and artists in criticism of Juan Perón’s policies and signed a manifesto in defense of democratic principles and artistic freedom, for which the composer was eventually dismissed from his teaching positions at state-run institutions. In the midst of this unrest, echoing Bartók’s 1924 penning of Hungarian Folksong as "a declaration of war on the cultural policies of the Horthy regime" (Lajos Lesznai, Bartók (London: J.M. Dent & Sons, Ltd., 1973) 120), Ginastera composed his opus 10 of 1943, Cinco canciones populares argentinas, or Five Popular Argentine Songs.

== Musical influences and style ==
In these songs, Ginastera draws from the Argentine cancionero popular, which catalogues the traditional songs and dances of each province and is used, in turn, to teach these to school children. While not all of the melodies of the opus 10 songs are of actual traditional folk origin, the tunes are, on the whole, more overtly Argentine than those of his other song sets composed during this period (Dos Canciones de Silvia Valdèz, Cantos del Tucumán, and Las Horas de una Estancia). The setting of such folk songs and folk poetry was not, of course, without precedent: Bach, Brahms, Mahler, de Falla, and Bartók are among the noteworthy examples of composers who had already drawn heavily on folk melodies and texts for their compositions for voice, and Copland was soon to follow. Like his forebears', Ginastera's settings accentuate the local color of the original folk elements, with "highly ingratiating combinations of melodic simplicity, Latin folk rhythms, and twentieth century harmonic practices" (David Edward Wallace. "Alberto Ginastera: An Analysis of His Style and Technique of Composition." Ph.D. dissertation, Northwestern University, 1964: 86). In these pieces, Ginastera places virtuosic demands on the pianist while allowing the singer to convey emotion in an understated vocal line.

== Songs ==
=== 1. Chacarera ===
The chacarera (from chacra, "farm") is deeply rooted in the central pampas and the northern Argentine interior, with popular variations in Uruguay and Bolivia. It is a rapid dance in triple meter for one or two couples, which begins with the beating of the feet on the ground while the guitarist strums the introductory bars.

There may be a link between the chacarera and the chaconne, which is described in The New Oxford Companion to Music as follows: "A dance in triple meter which originated in Latin America and was taken up as a form and variations in Spain and Italy in the early seventeenth century, in France soon after. The Latin American chacona had both instrumental and vocal accompaniment. The refrain was constructed upon one of a series of typical harmonic schemes (e.g. I-VI-IV-V; I-V-VI-V). Some composers used the same melody throughout the piece, repeating it in the manner of a ground bass." Many of these chaconne characteristics, such as a refrain in a "typical" harmonic scheme and an almost ostinato-like ground bass, are found in Ginastera's "Chacarera." It has been speculated that the chaconne and the chacarera had a common origin and parallel developments, now reunited appropriately in the neoclassicism of this composition.

This setting exhibits liberal use of hemiola, the result of alternation between 3/4 and 6/8 meters. The harmonization remains within the C major tonality of the repeating couplet, with dissonant embellishing and passing tones. Although Ginastera dedicated the five songs of opus 10 to the nationalistic Argentine composer Carlos Lopez Buchardo and his wife Brigida, the opening couplet of "Chacarera" ("A mì me gustan las ñatas y una ñata me ha tocado," or "I like beautiful snub-nosed girls, and one of them has caught my eye") suggests that Ginastera may also have had his new bride Mercedes de Toro (whose nickname was "Ñata") in mind, perhaps composing these pieces as a wedding gift, following Schumann's precedent of composing his opus 25 song cycle, Myrthen, some scholars believe, as a gift to his bride, Clara Wieck.

=== 2. Triste ===
While "triste" translated literally means "sad" or "sorrowful," the title of this song is not an adjective but rather, like the rest of the opus 10 songs, an indication of the song or dance type: In this case, it is a nostalgic song of unrequited love. Originating in the Andean yaraví of the Kechua Indians, this song type appears in various modalities and under various names in the lyrical tradition of several South American nations, including Chile, Bolivia, Uruguay, and Argentina (Francisco Curt Lange. Latin-American Art Music for the Piano by Twelve Contemporary Composers. (New York: G. Schirmer, Inc., 1942) xii). It was disseminated as the triste by the payadores in the pampa during the nineteenth century, and, though lacking a set form, is characterized by a slow guitar introduction, melodia-recitativo with sparse accompaniment (Diccionario de la Musica Labor, ed. Higinio Angles and Juaquín Pena, Barcelona (Editorial Labor, S.A., 1954) 2143), the use of lament sighs such as "Ah" or "Ay," and a half-tone descent in the final two notes of its motif.

In "Triste," Ginastera adds to these characteristics a sense of improvisational abandon, accentuating the hopelessness in this traditional text. The melody combines diatonic and pentatonic elements, characteristic of Incan pentatonic scales, with the reiterated tone G and its embellishing quartal grace notes in the introduction serving to establish "the pentatonic flavor of the succeeding melody" (Wallace, 86). Some scholars suggest that the starkly minimal accompaniment reflects the bleakness of the text, shows the influence on the composer of Copland's "lean, bony, open-air quality" (Ronald Crichton, "Ginastera's Quartets," Tempo vol 111 (December 1974) 34), and serves as a musical "imitation of the vast open spaces of the pampas . . . creating an image of the gauchos strumming their guitars in the wilderness" (Sergio de los Cobos, "Alberto Ginastera's Three Piano Sonatas: A Reflection of the Composer and his Country" D.M.A. thesis, Rice University, 1991: 17).

Accordingly, Ginastera uses his signature guitar chord twice in this piece, a tied thirty second note ascending arpeggiation of E-A-D-G-B-E, representing the open strings of the gaucho's guitar. This chord, with its intensely Argentine connotations, appears "like sherbet between courses, to cleanse the palate" (Alison Dalton, violinist, Chicago Symphony Orchestra, interview by author of this article, 1996) throughout Ginastera's career, in nearly all of the genres in which he composed. Though a similar harmonic resonance is achieved by playing nearly any series of four perfect fourths and a major third, the ubiquitous chord is most frequently spelled as above in Ginastera's compositions, regardless of the tonal center (or lack thereof) of the piece in which the chord appears. Consequently, if "Triste" is to be performed in transposition, the performers must consider the specific sonority of the E-A-D-G-B-E chord and whether it too should be transposed or left as written.

=== 3. Zamba ===
With no relation to the Brazilian samba, the Argentine zamba is a graceful eighteenth century scarf dance of Peruvian origin. The vocal part is based in a repeated four-bar theme, with guitar introduction and postlude. With romantic, often melancholic lyrics sung in a lilting 6/8 meter, it remains "the obligatory dance at all rural fiestas" (Diccionario de la Musica Labor, 2305). Ginastera's setting enhances the sway of the 6/8 meter with a syncopated accompanying pattern, and while the vocal melody maintains an F major tonality, the accompaniment alternates between F major and D minor in a manner characteristic of bimodal Argentine folk music. In some passages "there is considerable use of extended tertian and polytonal arpeggiation underneath the melodic line" (Wallace, 86).

=== 4. Arrorró ===
The arrorró is "a traditional lullaby whose origin has been lost through the centuries" (Pola Suarez Urtubey. Alberto Ginastera. (Buenos Aires: Ediciones Culturales Argentinas, 1967) 21). Of these five songs, "Arrorró" is the only instance where Ginastera has left the text, rhythm, and melody of the source unaltered, just as Brahms and Bartók had done in many of their settings and Copland would do in several of his Old American Songs, including the lullaby "The Little Horses." Ginastera sets this well-known Argentine lullaby in G major over a slow duple meter ostinato which, though centric to G as well, emphasizes dissonant auxiliary tones (Wallace, 86). Perhaps inspiration for the unobtrusive ostinato accompaniment came from de Falla's lullaby "Nana" in his Siete canciones populares españolas of 1914–15, drawn from the Andalusian tradition. Whereas Ginastera's lullaby is ABA with exact ostinati in the A sections, de Falla's is twenty measures of rhythmically identical ostinato with only slight chromatic shifting. In the arpeggios of the B section of "Arrorró," one sees the influence of Debussy’s piano music, comparable, for example, to the left hand of "Beau Soir."

=== 5. Gato ===
The gato (or "cat dance") came to the early South American colonies as a descendant of the Spanish romanza, with several Iberian cousins such as the mis-mis and the perdíz. It was initially popular in Chile, Mexico, and Peru, but found its greatest prosperity in both the rural and urban areas of Argentina from the late eighteenth through the late nineteenth centuries. In the wake of the milonga (and its more famous urban descendant, the tango), it fell out of favor in the zones near Buenos Aires, but found new vitality in the northern Argentine provinces and Bolivia. The form is based on the choreography of the six-part dance for one or two split couples:

1. guitar introduction
2. march with paso valseado, an exchange of triple-meter steps for each individual
3. zapateo, a textless section of four or eight musical phrases during which the man stomps his boots in place while the woman struts around him
4. repetition of the march
5. repetition of the zapateo
6. the giro final, which is the couple's spirited promenade around the dance area

Ginastera's "Gato" is to a certain degree faithful to this traditional six-part form, offering a piano introduction followed by two sections of text, then an interlude (a repetition of the introduction) followed by two sections of text, with vigorous zapateo interludes between each section.

Both the vocal melody and the accompaniment are in C major, but Ginastera "adds dissonance and dislocates tones horizontally to lend a polytonal aura to the background, [and] in the instrumental interludes between vocal stanzas, there is a frank espousal of bitonality, similar to sections of the earlier Danzas Argentinas" (Wallace, 86). As with "Chacarera," the words of "Gato," though not entirely nonsensical, are more significant for their rhythm than for their meaning.

With the vocal part and the right hand of the rudo accompaniment in 6/8 and the left hand in a relentlessly driving 3/4, "Gato" (as with some passages of "Chacarera") acquires the virile machismo of the malambo’s thrusting hemiolas. This is most evident in the zapateo interludes, in which the raw rhythmic intensity echos "Les Augures Printaniers / Danses des Adolescentes" in Stravinsky's Le Sacre du Printemps, which Ginastera cited as one of his earliest and most powerful musical influences. Ginastera recommends the use of a "non-legato touch, accenting lightly on the first beat of each measure" to best communicate the malambo’s motoric, energetic rhythm (Sister Mary Ann Hanley, CSJ. "The Compositions for Solo Piano by Alberto Ginastera." D.M.A. thesis, University of Cincinnati, 1969: 21). In response to their premiere in Buenos Aires, "Gato" was hailed as "the highest achievement of the five songs...for its sheer dynamic impulse" (La Nación, 14 July 1944, in Urtubey, 105).
