= Andrew Litton =

American orchestral conductor (born 1959)

Andrew Litton (born May 16, 1959, New York City) is an American orchestral conductor. Litton is a graduate of The Fieldston School.

== Biography ==
He studied piano with Nadia Reisenberg and conducting with Sixten Ehrling at the Juilliard School of Music in New York, receiving his Bachelor of Music degree and his Master of Music degree in piano and conducting. He also received lessons in conducting from Walter Weller at the Salzburg Mozarteum and Edoardo Müller in Milan. His early teachers included John DeMaio. The youngest-ever winner of the BBC International Conductors Competition in 1982, he served as assistant conductor at Teatro alla Scala and Exxon/Arts Endowment Assistant Conductor for the National Symphony Orchestra in Washington D.C. under Mstislav Rostropovich (1982–1985), where subsequently he was associate conductor (1985–1986). Litton was a participant in the Affiliate Artists Exxon-Arts Endowment Conductors Program. In 2003, he was awarded Yale University's Sanford Medal.

Litton started his conducting career with the Bournemouth Symphony Orchestra, where he served as the principal conductor from 1988 to 1994, and is now its conductor laureate. He served for twelve seasons as music director of the Dallas Symphony Orchestra from 1994 to 2006, following which he was named music director emeritus. From 2003 to 2017, he was artistic director of the Sommerfest concerts of the Minnesota Orchestra.

He has been music director and principal conductor of the Bergen Philharmonic Orchestra in Norway since 2003. In June 2008, his contract with the Bergen Philharmonic was extended through the 2010–2011 season. In March 2011, his Bergen contract was further extended through 2015. He concluded his Bergen tenure in 2015 and to take the title of conductor laureate with the orchestra. In June 2012, Litton accepted the post of Artistic Adviser with the Colorado Symphony Orchestra through the 2014–2015 season beginning September 1, 2012. In August 2013, the Colorado Symphony Orchestra elevated Litton's title to music director, with immediate effect. In December 2014, New York City Ballet appointed Litton its next music director, effective in September 2015. In September 2015, the Colorado Symphony Orchestra announced that Litton is to stand down from his post as the orchestra's music director after the 2015–2016 season, and to become the orchestra's artistic advisor and principal guest conductor through the 2017–2018 season. In May 2017, the Singapore Symphony Orchestra announced Litton as their new principal guest conductor, to begin September 2017.

Litton's recordings include a Grammy-winning William Walton's Belshazzar's Feast with Bryn Terfel and the Bournemouth Symphony, a set of Rachmaninoff Piano Concertos with pianist Stephen Hough, a live performance recording of Sweeney Todd, performed with the New York Philharmonic, which received a Grammy nomination. Other recordings: a Decca Walton Centennial boxed set, the complete Tchaikovsky Symphonies with the Bournemouth Symphony, the complete Rachmaninoff Symphonies with the Royal Philharmonic, Sergei Prokofiev's Romeo and Juliet with the Bergen Philharmonic Orchestra, and many Gershwin recordings, both as conductor and pianist, with the Dallas Symphony, Bournemouth Symphony, and Royal Philharmonic. Litton is one of the ambassadors to Music Traveler, together with Billy Joel, Hans Zimmer, John Malkovich, Sean Lennon, Adrien Brody.

Cultural offices
Preceded by Rudolf Barshai	Principal Conductor, Bournemouth Symphony Orchestra; 1988–1994	Succeeded by Yakov Kreizberg
Preceded by Simone Young	Principal Conductor, Bergen Philharmonic Orchestra; 2003–2015	Succeeded by Edward Gardner
Preceded by Jeffrey Kahane	Music Director, Colorado Symphony Orchestra; 2013-2016	Succeeded by Brett Mitchell
Preceded by Andrews Sill (interim music director)	Music Director, New York City Ballet; 2015-present	Succeeded by incumbent
