= Piano Concerto No. 2 (Ginastera) =

The Piano Concerto No. 2, Op. 39, is the second piano concerto by the Argentinian composer Alberto Ginastera. The work was commissioned by the Indianapolis Symphony Orchestra for the pianist Hilde Somer, to whom the concerto is dedicated. It was first performed by Somer and the Indianapolis Symphony Orchestra conducted by Izler Solomon on March 22, 1973.

== Composition ==
=== Structure ===
The concerto has a duration of approximately 35 minutes and is cast in four movements:

1. 32 Variazioni Sopra un accordo di Beethoven
2. Scherzo per la mano sinistra
3. Quasi una fantasia
4. Cadenza e finale prestissimo

The first and fourth movements of the concerto pay tribute to the music of Ludwig van Beethoven and Frédéric Chopin. The first movement, for example, is a set of 32 variations inspired by the seven-note chord at measure 208 of the finale of Beethoven's Ninth Symphony. The number of variations itself is a nod to Beethoven, whose 32 Variations in C minor and 32 piano sonatas are among his most significant works. The movement's 22nd variation additionally references the opening of Beethoven's Piano Sonata No. 26, Les Adieux. Similarly, the fourth movement was inspired by an eleven-note theme from the final movement of Chopin's Piano Sonata No. 2.

=== Instrumentation ===
The work is scored for a solo piano and a large orchestra comprising three flutes (3rd doubling piccolo), three oboes (3rd doubling cor anglais), three clarinets (3rd doubling bass clarinet), three bassoons (3rd doubling contrabassoon), four horns, four trumpets, four trombones, tuba, timpani, three percussionists, harp, celesta, and strings.

== Reception ==
Reviewing the world premiere, the music critic Patrick Corbin of The Indianapolis Star wrote, "It's a brilliant, percussive work in the contemporary vein that requires dazzling virtuosity on the part of the soloist." Reviewing a 2016 recording by Xiayin Wang and the BBC Philharmonic, Andrew Farach-Colton of Gramophone observed, "The thematic material is derived from the dissonant, crunching chord that opens the finale of Beethoven's Ninth Symphony, and there's a touching sense throughout the work of glancing back at the past while still looking resolutely ahead." He added, "I'd always thought of this work as inferior to the more popular First Concerto; this recording has made me seriously reconsider that opinion."
