= Danzas Argentinas =

Set of three dances for solo piano by Alberto Ginastera

Danzas Argentinas (Argentine Dances), Op. 2, is a set of three dances for solo piano written in 1937 by Alberto Ginastera, one of the leading Latin American composers of the 20th century. It was written while still a student at the National Conservatory, and was his first published composition.

== Dances ==
=== Danza del viejo boyero, Op. 2 no. 1 ===
The first piece, Danza del viejo boyero ("Dance of the Old Herdsman"), immediately strikes the ear as being odd. The reason is as simple as it is strange: the left hand plays only black notes, while the right plays only white notes. This means it is composed of two modes (bitonality), with the right hand in C major and the left in D♭ major. Despite the seemingly unavoidable cacophony of that arrangement, Ginastera manages to frame a simple and charming melody through the use of rhythm and texture. The piece ends with a chord (E–A–D–G–B), the notes of a guitar when tuning. As a result of the criollo influence while looking for an Argentinian language, this was one of Ginastera's favourite chords.

=== Danza de la moza donosa, Op. 2 no. 2 ===
Danza de la moza donosa ("Dance of the Graceful Girl") is a gentle dance in 6/8 time. A piquant melody meanders its way through the first section, constantly creating and releasing tension through the use of chromatic inflections. The second section introduces a new melody, more assured of itself than the first. The harmonisation of this section is based on the intervals of the fourth and fifth, which give the music a feeling of expansiveness. This sound, which Ginastera uses frequently, reflects the vastness of the Argentine pampas (grasslands). The final section returns to the opening melody, but with a richer harmonisation based on thirds. Unexpectedly, the piece ends with an atonal chord, instead of the tonic key, giving a feeling of uncertainty rather than conclusion.

=== Danza del gaucho matrero, Op. 2 no. 3 ===
With directions such as furiosamente ("furiously"), violente ("violent"), mordento ("biting"), and salvaggio ("wild"), Ginastera left no doubt as how the third dance, Danza del gaucho matrero ("Dance of the Outlaw Cowboy"), should be performed. Ginastera makes use of gratuitous dissonance in this piece, opening it with a 12-tone ostinato and frequently using minor seconds to harmonize otherwise simple melodies. The structure is a modified rondo (ABACDACD), and the thematic material alternates between chromatic passages (sections A and B) and highly tonal, melodic passages (C and D). The jubilant sound of the C section is achieved by harmonising every single melody note with a major chord, even if they are totally foreign to the tonic key. The D section, by contrast, does not use a single accidental; here, jubilance is expressed through the use of brisk tempo, strong rhythm, fortissimo, and a simple, majestic chord progression. As might be expected from the savageness of the rest of the piece, the coda is anything but subtle: ffff dynamics and a tremendous glissando that brings the dance to a close.
