= Piano Concerto No. 1 (Ginastera) =

1961 piano concerto by Alberto Ginastera

Piano Concerto
- No. 1
- by Alberto Ginastera
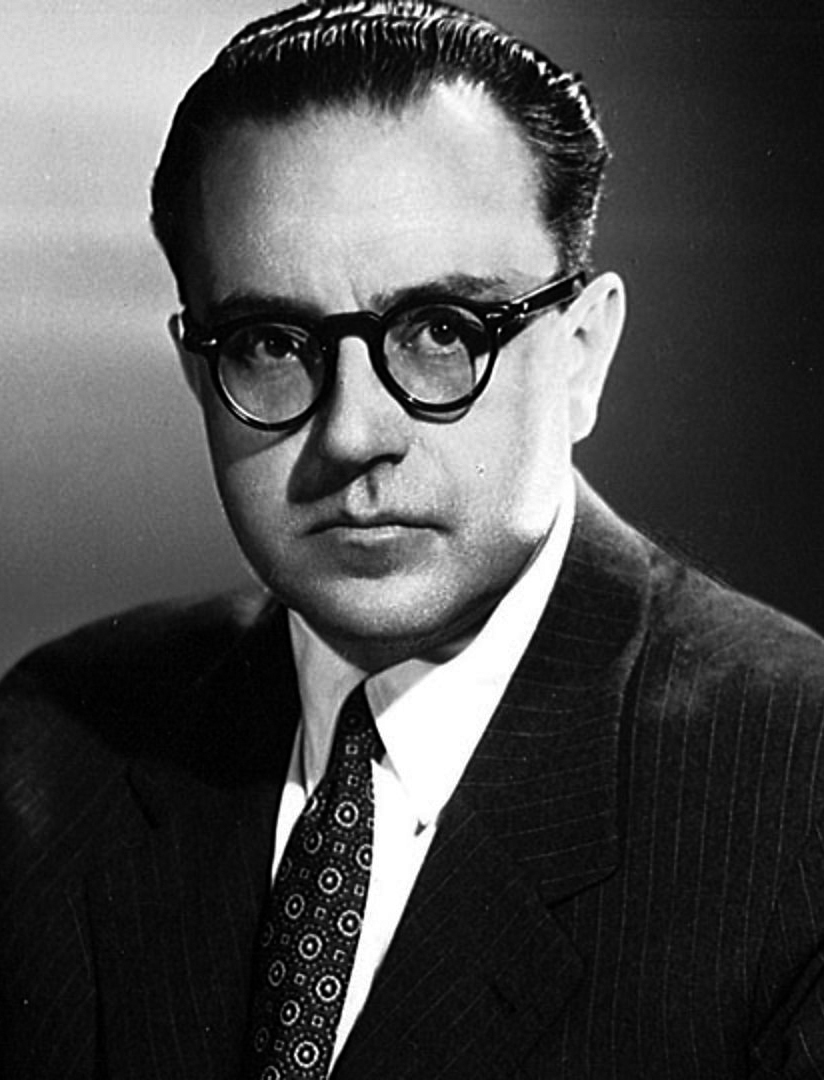
- Alberto Ginastera
- Opus: 28
- Commissioned by: Fondation Koussevitzky
- Composed: 1961
- Dedication: Serge and Natalie Koussevitzky
- Duration: 23 min : 50 s
- Movements: four

Premiere
- Date: April 22, 1961
- Location: Washington, D.C.
- Conductor: Howard Mitchell
- Performers: National Symphony Orchestra; João Carlos Martins (pianist)

The Piano Concerto No. 1, Op. 28, is the first piano concerto by the Argentinian composer Alberto Ginastera. The work was commissioned by the Koussevitzky Foundation and was completed in 1961. It was first performed by the pianist João Carlos Martins and the National Symphony Orchestra conducted by Howard Mitchell in Washington, D.C., on April 22, 1961. The concerto was Ginastera's first composition for piano since his Piano Sonata No. 1, Op. 22, written in 1952. It is dedicated to the memory of Serge and Natalie Koussevitzky.

== Music ==
The concerto has a duration of roughly 25 minutes and is composed in four movements:

1. Cadenza e varianti
2. Scherzo allucinante
3. Adagissimo
4. Toccata concertata

The work is scored for a solo piano and a large orchestra consisting of two flutes, piccolo, two oboes, cor anglais, two clarinets, E-flat clarinet, bass clarinet, two bassoons, contrabassoon, four horns, three trumpets, three trombones, tuba, timpani, five percussionists, harp, celesta, and strings.

== Reception ==
Reviewing a 2016 performance by the pianist Sergio Tiempo and the Los Angeles Philharmonic, Mark Swed of the Los Angeles Times called the concerto "a work of brutalist, magical realism" and wrote, "There are atmospheric and percussive moments when the score sounds slightly too much like Argentine Bartók, but there are also unusual evocations of eerie rain-forest weirdness and great thundering percussive romps. The massive solo part, fearlessly played by Sergio Tiempo, ranges from hauntingly jazzy bits to great bursts of keyboard color that the Venezuelan pianist seemed born to reveal." of The New York Times similarly remarked, "The concerto's chugging rhythms make Ginastera's lively atonal idiom feel accessible, understandable. Splatters of activity in the piano (...) fall over ethereal whispers in the strings."

== In popular culture ==
"Toccata"

Instrumental by Emerson, Lake & Palmer

from the album Brain Salad Surgery
- Released: November 19, 1973
- Recorded: 1973
- Genre: Progressive rock, hard rock
- Length: 7:23
- Label: Manticore
- Composers: Alberto Ginastera (arranged by Keith Emerson, percussion movement Carl Palmer)
- Producer: Greg Lake

An arrangement for rock band of the 4th movement, titled "Toccata", appears on the album Brain Salad Surgery by 1970s progressive rock and classical crossover group Emerson, Lake, & Palmer.

The electronic drum sound during the middle section of the track was achieved by placing a microphone in each of the drums to trigger a small synthesizer each time the drum was struck.

Rolling Stone magazine called their arrangement "brash and playful". Paul Stump, in his History of Progressive Rock, called it "as cacophonous a piece of rock music as existed at the time", particularly citing its effectively deranged use of electronics.
