= Antoine Claude Ponthus-Cinier =

French painter

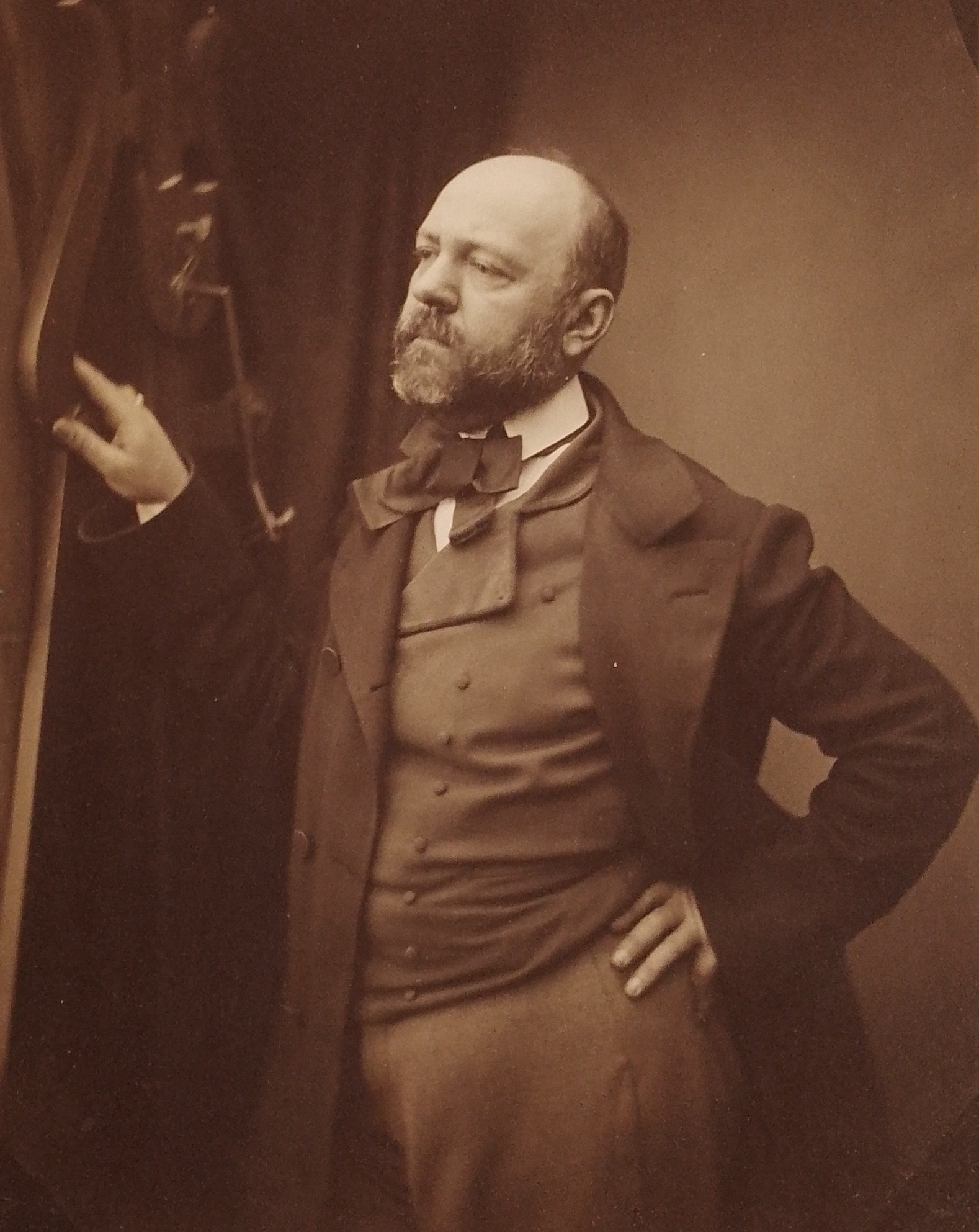
- Born: August 29, 1812; Lyon, France
- Died: January 17, 1885 (aged 72); Lyon
- Occupation: Artist
- Notable work: Adam and Eve chased from Paradise, The Tree Fellers.

Antoine Ponthus-Cinier was a French painter, born in Lyon on August 29, 1812, and died on January 17, 1885. He is considered one of the leaders of the neoclassical movement in Lyon and adopted a pastoral idyllic or arcadian style. His works cover many sites in Italy and southern France.

He studied under Paul Delaroche in Paris. He became a renowned painter in 1841 when he won the second Grand Prize of Rome for historical landscape painting with Adam and Eve Expelled from the Garden of Eden. He spent two years in Italy between 1842 and 1844, staying in Florence, Rome, Genoa, and Naples. He notably realized many drawings of Italian landscapes with historical ruins and monuments. Upon his return, he made a long journey through the Dauphiné, the Dombes, Provence, the Alps, Savoy, and the Pyrenees, eventually settling in Lyon, where he remained until his death. He became a member of the Société des aquafortistes de Paris, and his engravings were highly successful. He exhibited historical landscapes and simple landscapes in Lyon between 1837 and 1885, in Paris between 1841 and 1867, and in many regional exhibitions, notably in Montpellier, Bordeaux, Strasbourg, Nîmes, Geneva, Rouen and Dijon. The works exhibited included paintings, gouache-washed Indian ink drawings, watercolors, and a few etchings.

He bequeathed 50 works on paper to the Museum of Fine Arts of Lyon. The municipal library of Lyon has another collection of his works. An annual stipend of 1,000 francs for a prize bearing his name (an annual competition for “Landscape from a Decorative Perspective”) is awarded by the École des Beaux-Arts in Lyon. His studio was auctioned off in Lyon in March 1885. The Museum of the History of Lyon, and the fine arts museums of Chalon-sur-Saône, Besançon, Brou, Toulon, Puy-en-Velay, Chambéry, Chantilly, and Valence, Newcomb Art Museum of Tulane University and Cleveland, Ohio have works by him in their collections.

== Biography ==
=== Family ===
Antoine Ponthus-Cinier was born in Lyon, France on August 29, 1812, on Rue Saint-Jean, into a lower-middle-class family. His father, Jean Joseph Ponthus Cinier, was secretary of the municipal administration before becoming clerk of the Royal Court of Lyon. His mother was Antoinette Novet (born around 1778, daughter of François Novet, who was executed in 1794 after the siege of Lyon). The painter's brother, Jean-Claude (born January 18, 1800), was a designer in a factory when he was drafted into military service in 1820. In 1844, he was listed as a partner in the Tarare factory that produced plush for hats (JB.E. et P. Martin, in Paris, rue Rambeau).

=== Education ===
Ponthus-Cinier enrolled at the École des Beaux-Arts in Lyon in 1829, but according to Marius Audin and Eugène Vial, he did not attend.. He became a student of Paul Delaroche at the École des Beaux-Arts in Paris before traveling to Italy for two years from 1842 to 1844. This trip would be the highlight of his artistic training.

== Production ==
=== Landscape painting ===
Ponthus-Cinier's training in Paris and his artistic career led him to paint landscapes, a genre created in Italy in the 18th century. Before traveling to Italy, the works he valued most were historical landscape compositions based on biblical themes (Adam and Eve expelled from the Garden of Eden). After his trip to Italy, he tried to adapt his inspiration to pure landscapes combining French Romanticism and the Italian illusionist realism of his time. What Ponthus-Cinier loved was an architectural structure with water in the form of a sheet or a pool that softened it, while vegetation enlivened it and the sky illuminated it. He liked the reminiscence of Italian landscapes in this combination, where traces of man, canals, roads, bridges, and man himself bear witness to his direct presence. Art critics of his century, such as Jouve, regret this repetition of a landscape deemed too perfect, while praising Ponthus-Cinier's technique:

We will not dispute Mr. Ponthus-Cinier's rare and distinguished qualities, his fine and suave touch, his charming and truthful colors, and his art of illuminating a canvas. But isn't this striking family resemblance found in all his landscapes a flaw in his talent? Look at nature... isn't it infinitely varied in all its aspects?

=== Drawings ===
Ponthus-Cinier's graphic work can be divided into several types. He used drawings in particular to create landscape paintings based on his observations. In 1840, he won second prize in a sketching competition with La Samaritaine. During his stay in Italy, he built up a collection of drawings that he later used as sources and models for his subsequent works. There are a significant number of Italian landscapes, mainly views of historical sites created between 1842 and 1844, executed in India ink, in the reserves of the Lyons municipal library.

=== Major works ===
Ponthus-Cinier won the second Grand Prize of Rome for historical landscapes in 1841, with the presentation of Adam and Eve chased from Terestrial Paradise. This painting is currently the property of the Museum of Fine Arts of Lyon.. Other museums with his works are in Besançon, Bourg-en-Bresse, Chalon-sur-Saône, Chantilly, Puy-en-Velay, Toulon, Valence, Vichy, and Cleveland in Ohio.

==== Gallery ====
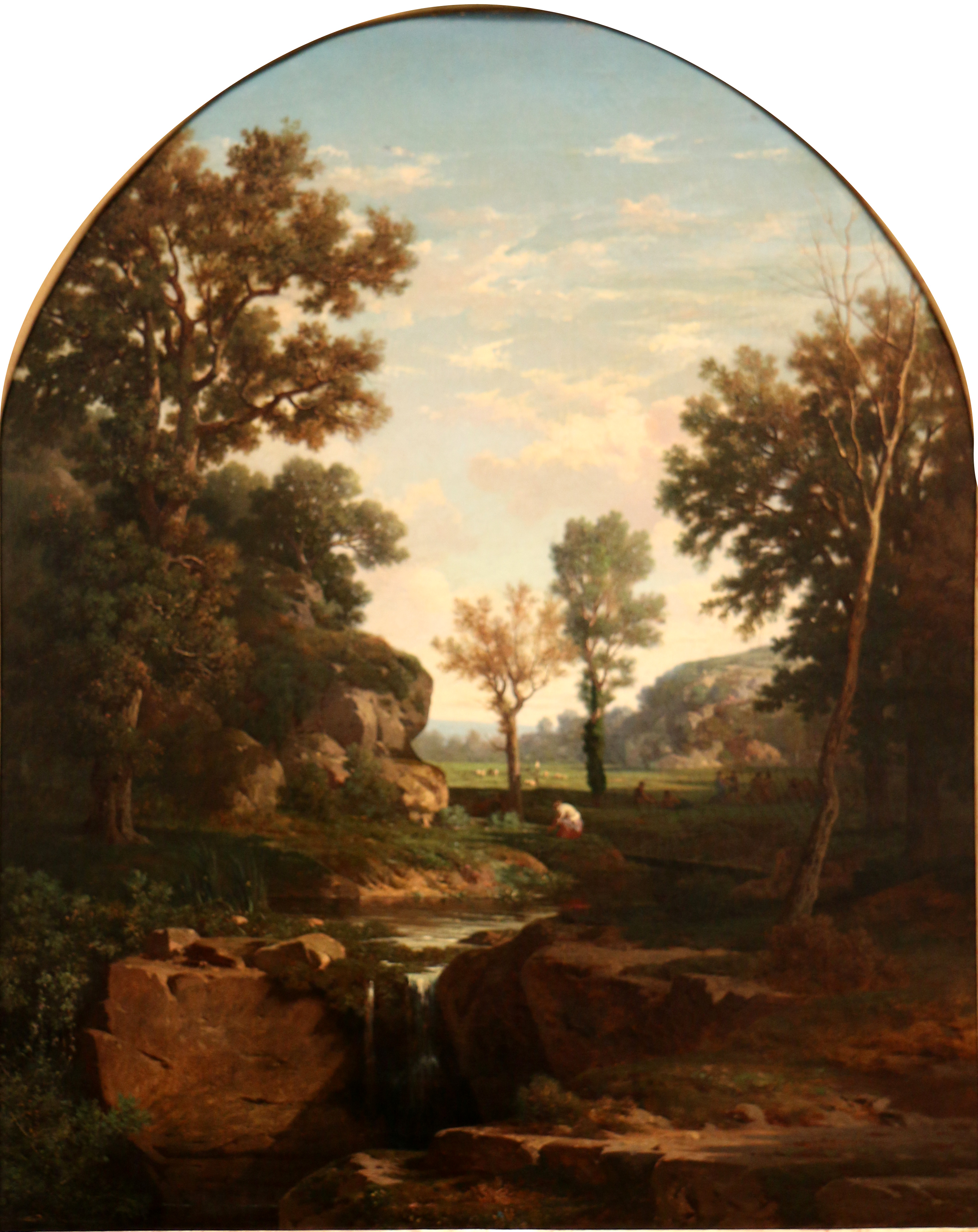
Landscape with waterfall, Musée d’Art de Toulon

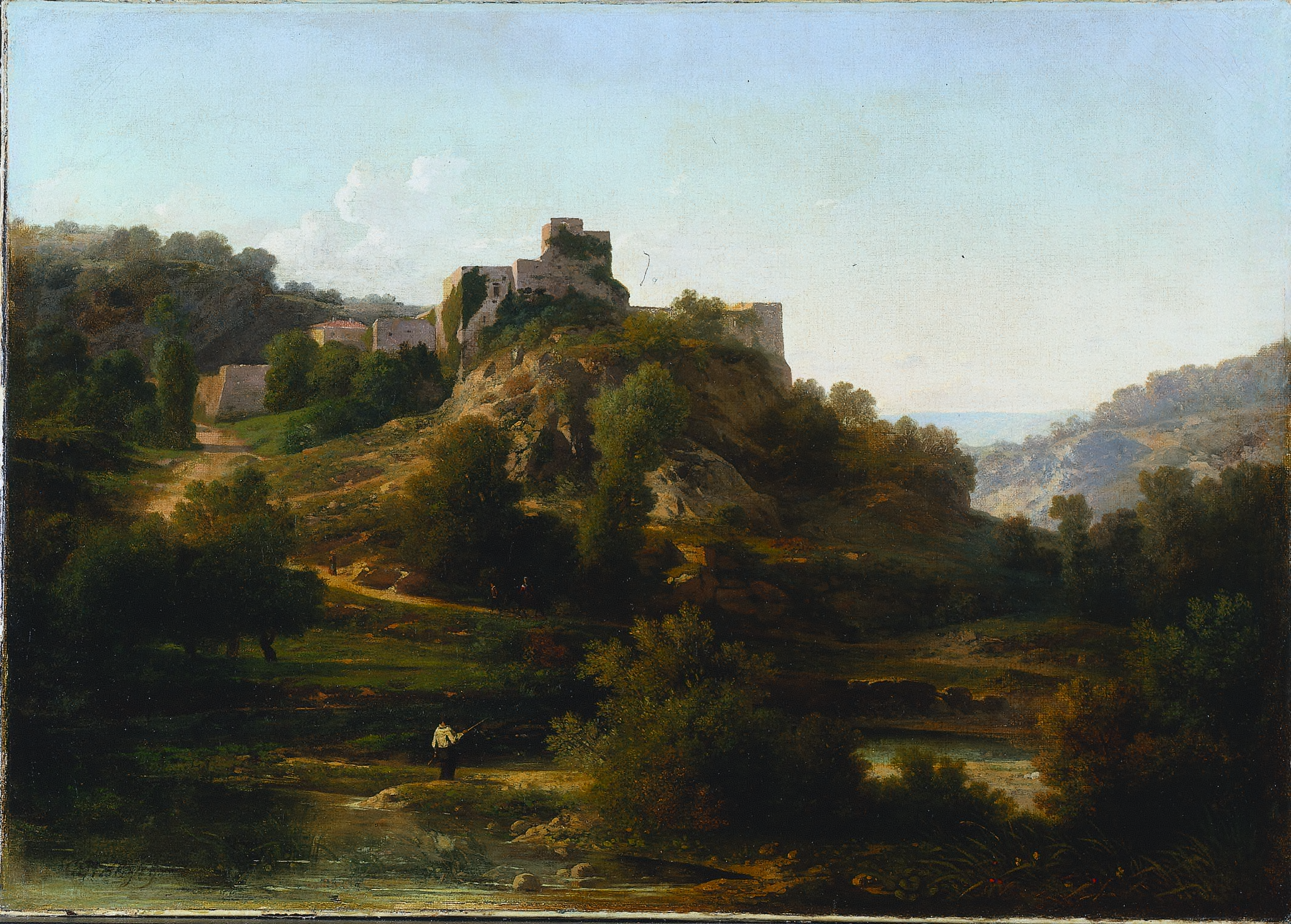
Châteauvieux on the Suran river, Cleveland Museum of Art

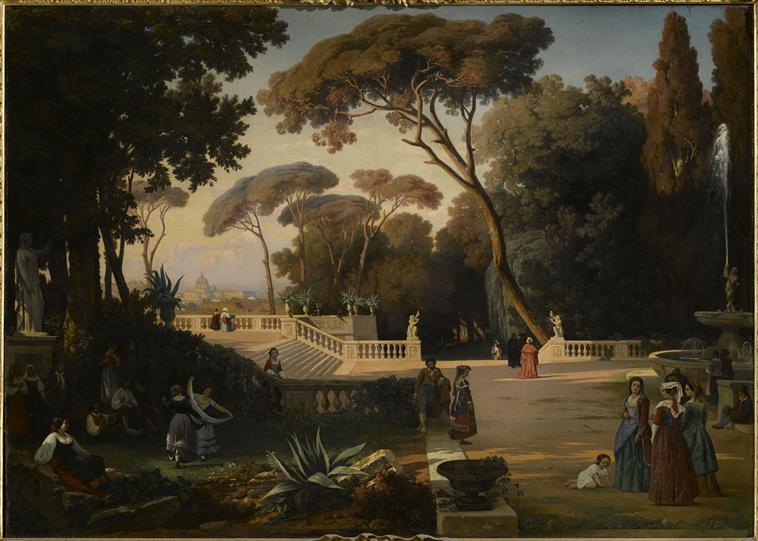
Pamphili Villa, Musée Condé

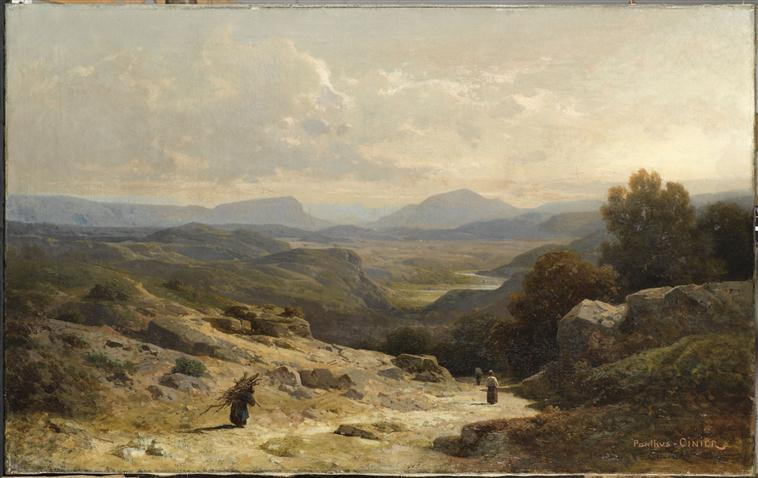
The Valromey, Musée Condé

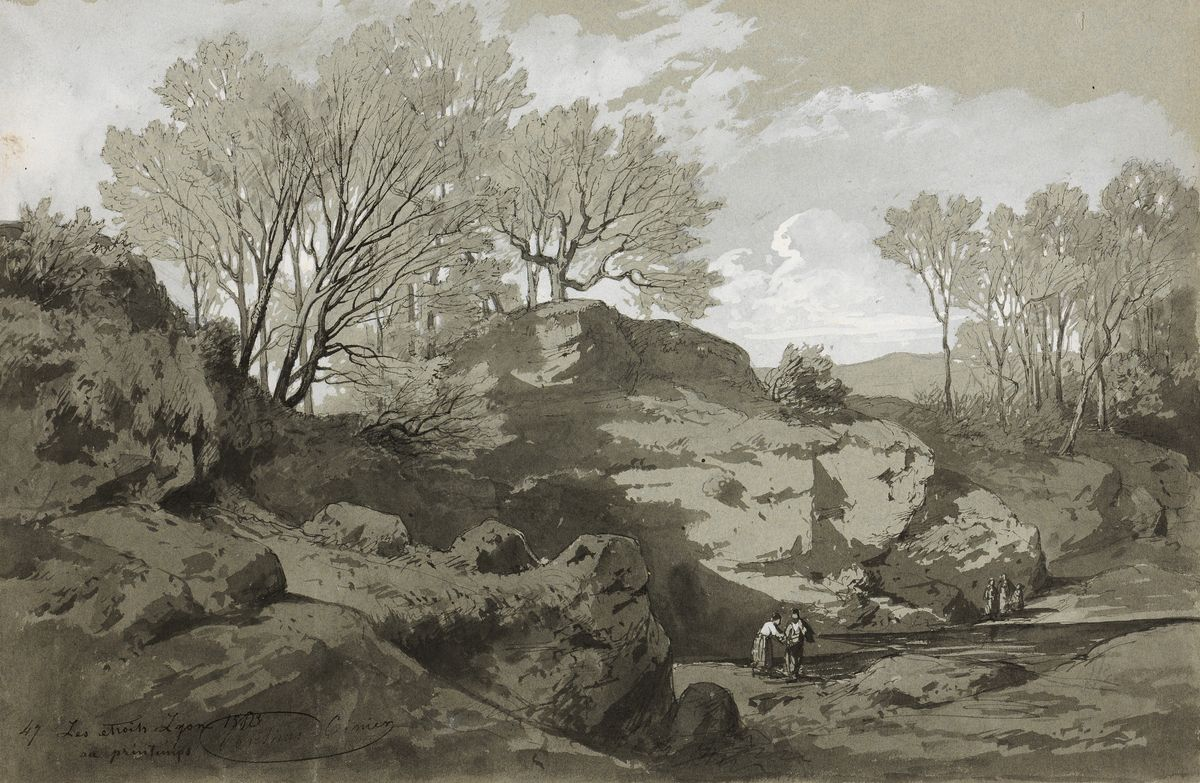
Les étroits in Lyon, Museum of Fine Arts of Lyon

== Bibliography ==
=== Sources ===
- Desvernay, F. Le vieux Lyon à l’exposition internationale urbaine de 1914, Lyon, 1915
- Gouttenoir, B. Dictionnaire des peintres et sculpteurs à Lyon aux XIX^{e} et XX^{e} siècles, La Taillanderie, 2002.
- Harambourg, L. Dictionnaire des peintres paysagistes français du 19th century. Idées et calendes, 1985.
- Hardouin-Fugier, Élisabeth. Le peintre et l’animal en France au 19th century. Édition de l’amateur, Paris, 2001.
- Hardouin-Fugier, Élisabeth; Grafe, E. Répertoire des peintres lyonnais du 19th century en Bugey, Centre d’Art Lacoux, 1980.
- Revue de la bibliothèque de Lyon, September 2008, number 20.
- Paysagistes lyonnais, 1800–1900, Lyon Museum of Fine Arts, September 1984.
- Livret du S.A.D.A. Lyon, years 1839–1885.
- Salon de 1942. Société lyonnaise des Beaux-Arts, 1942.
- Schurr, Gérald; Cabanne, Pierre. Dictionnaire des petits maîtres de la peinture, 1820–1920, volume II, les éditions de l’amateur, Paris, 1979.
- Vial, A.; Bailly-Herzberg, J. L’eau-forte de peintre, la société des aquafortistes, volume II, Léonce Laget, Paris, 1972.
- Vial, Eugène; Audin, Marius. Dictionnaire des artistes et ouvriers d’arts du Lyonnais, volume 2, Paris, 1918.
