= Robert Frascino =

American physician, immunologist and advocate

- Frascino in 2006
- Born: June 12, 1952; Rochester, New York, USA
- Died: September 17, 2011 (aged 59); Mountain View, California, USA
- Education: University of California, San Francisco (postdoctoral fellowship); Children's Hospital Oakland (internship/residency); University of Cincinnati (M.D.); Oberlin College (B.A.)
- Known for: Physician (HIV specialist); HIV/AIDS advocate; president of the Robert James Frascino AIDS foundation; advice columnist on TheBody.com
- Scientific career
- Fields: Immunology, HIV specialty
- Workplaces: Stanford University

Robert James Frascino (June 12, 1952 – September 17, 2011) was an American physician, immunologist, and advocate for HIV-positive people. He was one of the first physicians to specialize in HIV during the outbreak of AIDS in the early 1980s. After an occupational exposure to the virus in 1991 left him HIV-positive, his health declined, and he had to retire from his work as a physician in 1996. At that time, he became active in HIV/AIDS education and advocacy. In 1999, he co-founded the Robert James Frascino AIDS Foundation, a nonprofit organization that raises money to benefit AIDS patients in need of treatment and to fund HIV/AIDS educational programs worldwide. A concert pianist, Frascino performed annually with other musicians at A Concerted Effort, a benefit concert for his charity. From May 2000 until his death, he responded to questions from the public in two informational forums on TheBody.com, an educational resource on HIV/AIDS run by Remedy Health Media.

== Early life ==
Frascino was born in 1952 in Rochester, New York, to Jennie and Angelo Frascino. He developed an interest in music at an early age, and he nearly attended the University of Rochester on a music scholarship. However, because he was also keenly interested in science and because the University of Rochester's science and music courses were offered on separate campuses, he went on to complete his undergraduate work at Oberlin College, where he studied music and biology. He received his bachelor's degree in biology (with high honors) from Oberlin in 1974. Initially, Frascino did not plan to continue his education or to attend medical school after graduating. However, after one of his chemistry professors encouraged him to become a physician, he applied to medical school and went on to receive his M.D. from the University of Cincinnati. After completing his internship and residency at Children's Hospital Oakland, he moved on to a postdoctoral fellowship at the University of California, San Francisco.

== Career ==
I was a physician by profession, but suddenly I began experiencing both sides of the examining table. I could now speak with the knowledge and authority of a physician, but with the eyes and heart and soul of a patient.

— Frascino, on contracting HIV through an occupational exposure

When AIDS became widespread in the early 1980s, Frascino was one of the first physicians to specialize in the virus. He was completing his postdoctoral work in San Francisco when the disease emerged there, and as a clinical immunologist, he began to see AIDS patients regularly. From 1983 to 2001, he worked as an associate clinical professor of medicine in Stanford University Medical Center's Division of Immunology, Rheumatology, and Allergy. During that time, he opened the Frascino Medical Group, a practice consisting of two clinics devoted to HIV/AIDS care. He also began to serve as medical director of an oncology-immunology infusion and research center.

In 1991, while working at his medical practice in Sunnyvale, California, Frascino became infected with HIV while drawing fluid from an HIV-positive patient's blister. According to the Los Altos Town Crier, "the patient jerked, jamming the needle into the doctor's gloved hand. Despite receiving prophylactic antiviral medication immediately, Frascino tested positive for HIV a few weeks later." Although Frascino had to retire from his medical practice in 1996 when his health began to decline, he noted that acquiring HIV had given him a unique perspective during his years of work with patients. Sixteen years later, he said, "There are risks to being a physician, including contracting an illness. I took that risk. I would take that risk again to be a physician."

=== Robert James Frascino AIDS Foundation ===
In 1996, shortly after Frascino had stopped working as a physician, he and his partner, Steven Natterstad, M.D., held a small charitable event in their home. They played piano to raise money for a local AIDS organization, and because of the success of that event, they founded the Robert James Frascino AIDS Foundation three years later. The foundation's self-described mission is "to provide crucial services for men, women, and children living with HIV/AIDS and to raise awareness of the HIV/AIDS epidemic through advocacy and education." Each year, Frascino performed with Natterstad and San Francisco Conservatory of Music Professor William Wellborn at A Concerted Effort, a concert series whose proceeds benefit the foundation. Since its inception, the Robert James Frascino AIDS Foundation has raised more than $1,500,000 for its goals. The foundation's beneficiaries include hospice care programs in Los Angeles, AIDS education programs in primary schools in Mendocino, the pediatric program at Children's Hospital Oakland, AIDS Legal Services of San Jose, and HIV-positive women in sub-Saharan Africa, to whom the foundation provides medication that reduces the chance of passing on the disease to their children during labor.

=== The Body ===
In May 2000, Frascino began to run two advice forums on TheBody.com, a comprehensive resource about HIV/AIDS funded by Remedy Health Media. His forums on The Body, the largest database of HIV/AIDS information in the world, focused on Safe Sex and HIV Prevention and on Fatigue and Anemia. Having studied French before and during his undergraduate years, Frascino was bilingual and responded to questions in both French and English on the site. Throughout the 11 years he contributed to The Body, he answered about 30,000 questions. During his last 10 months of service there, Frascino (or Dr. Bob, as he was known to the online community) regularly published a blog titled "Life, Love, Sex, HIV and Other Unscheduled Events."

=== Affiliations and publications ===
Frascino was a fellow of the American Academy of Allergy, Asthma, and Immunology and of the American Academy of Pediatrics. He was also a member of the American Academy of HIV Medicine. In 2004, he joined Oberlin College's board of trustees. Additionally, he served terms as president of the California Society of Allergy, Asthma, and Clinical Immunology, of the Allergy/Immunology Association of Northern California, and of the Allergy, Asthma, Immunology Foundation of Northern California. He also spent time as chairman of the Santa Clara County Medical Society's AIDS Task Force.

Frascino's biography on The Body notes that "as primary investigator in numerous HIV clinical trials, he ... published articles on evolving new treatments and quality of life issues for people living with the virus in such journals as International Journal of STD and AIDS, Western Journal of Medicine, Journal of AIDS, and Blood."

== Personal life ==
Maybe I was meant to get this disease for a purpose. Maybe I'm here to remind everyone that we're in the third decade of this illness, that there are 42 million people infected and 22 million killed worldwide, and we still don't have a cure or vaccine even on the distant horizon.

— Frascino, in a 2003 interview on his HIV-positive status

Frascino resided in Los Altos, California, with his husband Steven Natterstad, whom he met in 1991. Natterstad, also an HIV specialist and concert pianist, had been hired to work for the same medical practice at that time. The two began a relationship in 1993. They were married on October 31, 2008, and Natterstad remained HIV-negative throughout their time together. In addition to working as president of the Frascino Medical Group in Los Altos, Natterstad serves as the Frascino AIDS Foundation's vice-president. He also responds to questions in Vivir con el VIH and Vivere con l'HIV, The Body's informational forums for Spanish- and Italian-speakers, respectively.

Family, friends, colleagues, and readers of The Body regularly remarked upon Frascino's optimism with respect to his illness, and he himself commented frequently on his contentment with life. When his brother died of brain cancer in 2007, Frascino said, "It was such a privilege to help him at the end of his life. The service was exactly what he wanted. Even something as sad as that, I have good memories of what happened. That's not to say that I don't miss him." In 2003, The Lancet, a weekly peer-reviewed medical journal, quoted him discussing HIV's significance in directing his work in an unexpected but rewarding way.

=== Health ===
As he had been HIV-positive since 1991, Frascino's health deteriorated until 1996, when HAART (Highly Active Antiretroviral Therapy) became available to HIV/AIDS patients. These new antiretroviral drugs improved his health dramatically. However, unlike the drugs Frascino had taken previously, his new medications produced much stronger side effects. A 2005 article on Frascino in the San Jose Mercury News reported that he was taking 26 antiretroviral pills per day to keep the virus at bay. Two years later, that number increased to 30. He remained active as president of the Frascino AIDS Foundation and as a resident expert at The Body until three days before his death.

==== Death ====
On the evening of September 16, 2011, two days before A Concerted Effort 2011 was scheduled to take place, Frascino developed chills at the post-rehearsal dinner. Throughout that night and into the next morning, he had a fever but did not find his symptoms alarming, thinking he was perhaps coming down with the flu. However, when he began to experience severe lower-back pain later in the day, Natterstad and Frascino's sister Linda took him to the emergency room, where doctors discovered that his blood pressure was low and that his vital organs were not receiving enough oxygen. They determined he was suffering from bacterial sepsis and placed him on a ventilator. Two and a half hours later, he was pronounced dead. The official cause and date of death were listed as bacterial sepsis on September 17, 2011.

== Awards and honors ==
In 1997, the National Society of Fundraising Executives presented Frascino and Natterstad with the Distinguished Honoree/Silicon Valley Philanthropy Award. During the same year, Frascino received the Outstanding Contribution in Medical Education Award from the Santa Clara County Medical Association. Five years later, in 2002, the Global Health Council gave Frascino the Bobbi Campbell AIDS Hero Award at the International AIDS Candlelight Vigil in San Francisco. Governor of California Gray Davis and Mayor of San Francisco Willie Brown sent him personal letters of congratulations for the accomplishment.
