= Harlow Robinson =

American historian (born 1950)

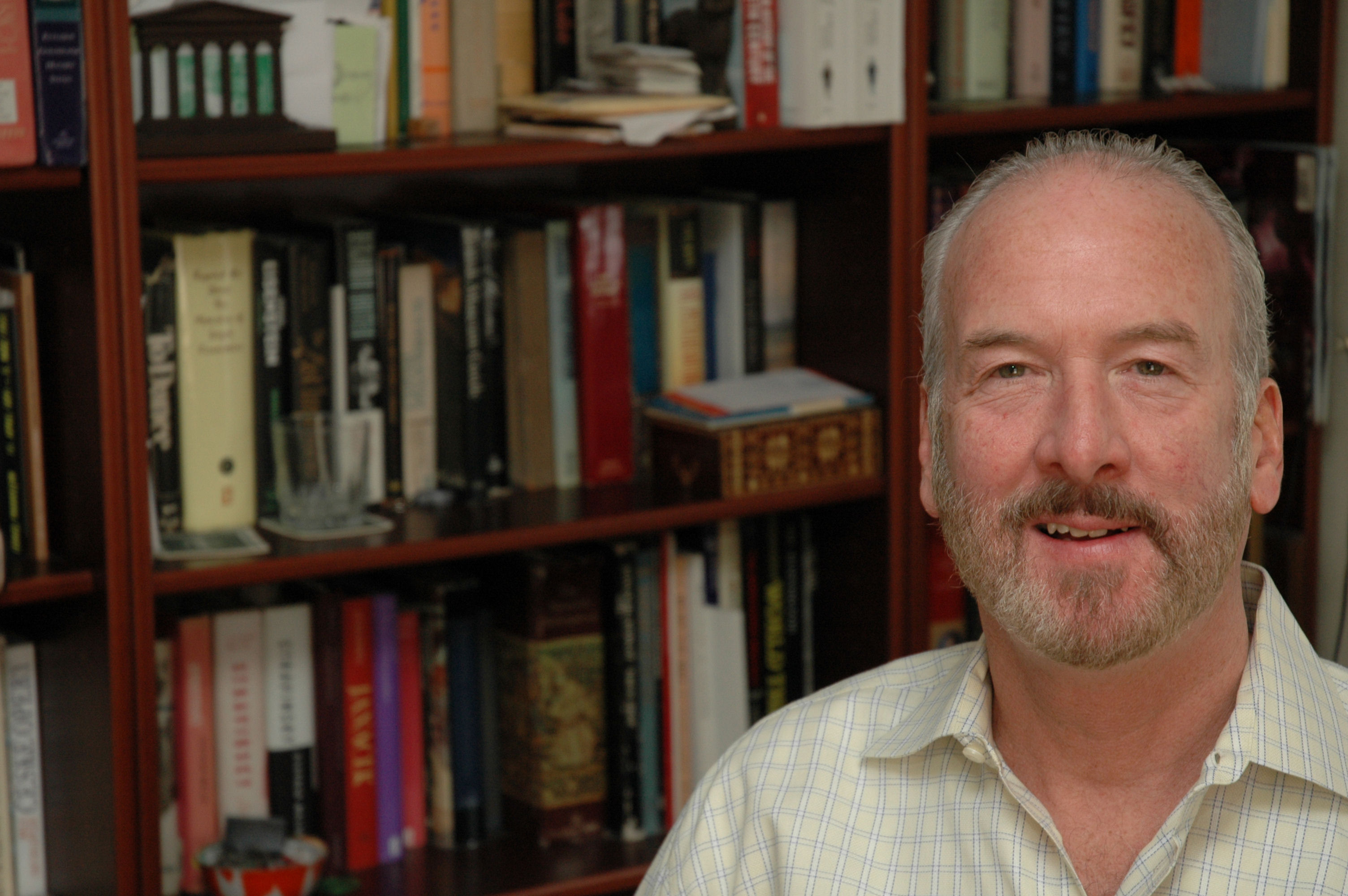
- Robinson in 2007
- Born: Harlow Loomis Robinson; September 20, 1950 (age 76); Bristol, Connecticut, U.S.
- Occupation: University professor
- Known for: Russian cultural history

Academic background
- Education: University of California at Berkeley
- Thesis: The Operas of Sergei Prokofiev and Their Russian Literary Sources (1980)

Academic work
- Era: 1980–present
- Discipline: Slavic language and literature
- Notable works: Sergei Prokofiev: A Biography (1987)
- Website: http://members.authorsguild.net/harlow/index.htm

Harlow Loomis Robinson (born September 20, 1950) is an American historian, author, and lecturer specializing in Russian cultural history, film, and music. He is a Matthews Distinguished University Professor of History, Emeritus, at Northeastern University. His research focuses on Russian-American cultural exchange, the representation of Russians in American media, and the lives and works of key figures in Russian and Soviet culture.

== Background ==
Robinson was born in Bristol, Connecticut. During high school, inspired by the film adaption of Dr. Zhivago, he started studying Russian on a program to Cornell University. He also studied Russian music and literature.

He studied in Leningrad and traveled extensively throughout the Soviet Union and post-Soviet states, making over 25 trips to the region since the 1970s. His immersion in Russian society especially through connections with the cultural and LGBTQ communities shaped much of his scholarly and journalistic work.

In 1972, he received a BA in Russian from Yale University and graduated Phi Beta Kappa, Magna cum laude. He took a "world tour" that included crossing Asia by the Trans-Siberian Railway. In 1975, he received an MA in Slavic languages and literature, followed in 1980 a doctorate also in Slavic languages and literatures, both at the University of California at Berkeley. His doctoral thesis was on "The Operas of Sergei Prokofiev and Their Russian Literary Sources," for which he spent spent a year in London and Paris followed by an academic year in Soviet Union.

== Career ==
Before studying for his doctorate, Robinson worked as a journalist for his hometown Bristol newspaper as well as the Hartford Courant. During his "world tour," he also taught English in Japan (1972–1973).

Robinson began his academic career as assistant professor in the Slavic department of the State University of New York at Albany (SUNY Albany) (1980-1994), where he chaired the Departments of Slavic languages and Literature (1992-1994) and Germanic and Slavic languages and literature (1994-1995).

In 1996, Robinson moved to Northeastern University in Boston, where he has taught courses on Russian cultural history, history of Soviet cinema, the image of Russia in American culture, and Prague, Vienna, Budapest 1867–1918. He was named Matthews Distinguished University Professor in 2004.

At Northeastern, he has also served as chair of Modern Languages (1996–99), Cinema Studies (acting director, 1998–99), International Affairs Program (2000-2001 advisor), and Department of History (2013–14). He served as vice president of the American Association of Teachers of Slavic and East European Languages.

Robinson has delivered public lectures at the Boston Symphony, New York Philharmonic, Metropolitan Museum of Art, Metropolitan Opera, Lincoln Center, Philadelphia Orchestra, Los Angeles Music Center Opera, Guggenheim Museum, San Francisco Symphony, Rotterdam Philharmonic, Aspen Music Festival and Bard Festival.

He has worked as a consultant for performing arts organizations and has served as writer and commentator for PBS, NPR and the Canadian Broadcasting System.

Robinson is the author of several books, including Russians in Hollywood, Hollywood’s Russians; Sergei Prokofiev: A Biography; Selected Letters of Sergei Prokofiev; The Last Impresario: The Life, Times and Legacy of Sol Hurok; and Lewis Milestone: Life and Films.

In 2010, Robinson was named an Academy Film Scholar by the Academy of Motion Picture Arts and Sciences. He has received fellowships from the Fulbright Foundation, American Council of Learned Societies, International Research & Exchanges Board (IREX), the National Endowment for the Humanities, and the Whiting Foundation.

== Scholarly work ==
Robinson is known for his interdisciplinary scholarship at the intersection of Russian cultural history, film studies, and musicology. His work has focused particularly on Russian and Soviet influence in American culture, as well as the lives and legacies of key 20th-century artistic figures. He is the author of Sergei Prokofiev: A Biography (1987), considered a foundational English-language study of the composer, and editor and translator of Selected Letters of Sergei Prokofiev (1998). He has written program and liner note essays for recording companies, orchestras, opera companies and festivals around the world. For the Boston Symphony Orchestra he contributed all the liner note essays for their ten-year recording project of the music of Dmitri Shostakovich, released in 2025 by Deutsche Grammophon.

Robinson has also written on the history of Russian émigré artists in the United States. His book Russians in Hollywood, Hollywood’s Russians (2007) examines the depiction of Russians in American film and the contributions of Russian immigrants to the development of the Hollywood industry. In 2019, he published Lewis Milestone: Life and Films, a comprehensive study of the Academy Award-winning director, supported by a grant from the Academy of Motion Picture Arts and Sciences as part of their Academy Film Scholars program.

His essays, reviews, and cultural commentary have appeared in a range of publications, including The New York Times, The Boston Globe, Los Angeles Times, Opera News, Musical America, The Nation, and Cineaste.

His academic writing often engages with Cold War cultural politics and transnational artistic exchange. In recent years, Robinson has also written critical essays on Cold War historiography, including a comparative review of Louis Menand’s The Free World and Anne Searcy’s Ballet in the Cold War.

== Views and opinions ==
Robinson has expressed concern that American cinema has often relied on reductive stereotypes, presenting Russians alternately as villains, ideologues, or comic figures. He has argued that these portrayals reflect broader ideological trends and have continued to evolve with shifting political climates, including renewed tensions in U.S.–Russia relations in the 21st century.

Robinson has also examined the use of cultural exchange particularly in the performing arts as a tool of diplomacy during the Cold War. He has emphasized the importance of understanding how political ideologies and aesthetic preferences intersected in ballet, music, and film during this era, and has continued to advocate for nuanced approaches to studying cultural representation across borders.

== Fellowships, honors, awards ==
- 2010: Academy Film Scholar the Academy of Motion Picture Arts and Sciences
- 2010: Institutional Grants Committee from the Academy of Motion Picture Arts and Sciences for research on Oscar-winning director Lewis Milestone
- Fellowship/grant, American Council of Learned Societies
- Fellowship/grant, Fulbright
- Fellowship/grant, Whiting Foundation
- NDFL Fellowship in Czech, University of California, Berkeley, 1974–75; in Russian, 1973-74

== Works ==
Major publications include:

- The legend of the invisible city of Kitezh and the maiden Fevronia: An opera in four acts, libretto by Vladimir Ivanovich Belsky, English version by Harlow Robinson (Melville, NY: Belwin-Mills, 1984)
- Sergei Prokofiev: A Biography (New York: Viking Press, 1987) (1988) (2002)
- The Last Impresario: The Life, Times and Legacy of Sol Hurok (New York: Viking Press, 1994) (1995)
- Selected Letters of Sergei Prokofiev, translated, edited and introduced by Harlow Robinson (Boston: Northeastern University Press, 1998)
- Vasilisa the fair, based on The frog princess and other Russian folk tales by Sophia Prokofieva and Irina Tokmakova, music by Alla Lander, translated by Sabina Modzhalevskaya and Harlow Robinson, adapted by Adrian Mitchell (New York: Samuel French, 2003)
- Russians in Hollywood, Hollywood's Russians (Lebanon, NH: University Press of New England, 2007)
- Lewis Milestone: Life and films (Lexington, KY: University of Kentucky Press: 2019)

He has also contributed essays, articles, and reviews to the: New York Times, Los Angeles Times, The Nation, Opera News, Opera Quarterly, Dance, Playbill, Symphony and other publications.

== See also ==
- Sergei Prokofiev
- Sol Hurok
- Lewis Milestone
