= Marc Ponthus =

Marc Ponthus pioneered the monographic solo piano recital of leading avant-garde composers from the second half of the 20th century, devoting entire programs to Pierre Boulez, Karlheinz Stockhausen, Iannis Xenakis and others. He has performed extensively in North America and abroad in London, Paris, Berlin, Moscow, Beijing and featured in many contemporary music festivals. Ponthus has recorded for Neuma Records, Lorelt Records and Bridge Records. His recording of the complete piano music of Pierre Boulez released in 2016 was chosen Editor's Choice by Gramophone Magazine. Ponthus has conducted the LowerEastsideEnsemble, the IFCP Ensemble and the Project Webern Orchestra in addition to staging and directing contemporary chamber operas. Ponthus is the founder and director of the Institute and Festival for Contemporary Performance in New York.

A recipient of the Tanne Foundation Award for achievement in the arts, he incorporates video collage in live performances. He has written and directed experimental short films which have been chosen official selections at international festivals (NewFilmMakers New York, IndyFest Film Awards, Revelation Perth Int Film Festival, Northeast Int Film Festival).

His performances have been reviewed by The New York Times.

In addition to his artistic endeavors, Ponthus has been involved in humanitarian issues, writing for the London newspaper The Independent about his experiences in war-torn Sarajevo.
