= List of compositions for piano and orchestra =

This is a list of compositions for piano and orchestra. For a description of related musical forms, see Concerto and Piano concerto.

== Piano concertos and works in concertante form ==
=== A ===
- Johann Christian Ludwig Abeille
  - Grand Concerto in D major, Op. 6 (1763), for one piano four-hands and orchestra
- Carl Friedrich Abel
  - 6 Concertos for harpsichord (or pianoforte), two violins and cello, Op. 11 (first printed in 1771; F, B♭, E♭, D, G, C)
- Anton García Abril
  - Piano Concerto
- Jean Absil
  - Concerto for Piano and Orchestra No. 1, Op. 30 (1938)
  - Concerto for Piano and Orchestra No. 2, Op. 131 (1967)
  - Concerto for Piano and Orchestra No. 3, Op. 162 (1973)
- John Adams
  - Grand Pianola Music (1982)
  - Eros Piano (1989)
  - Century Rolls for piano and orchestra (1997)
  - Must the Devil Have All the Good Tunes? (2018)
- Richard Addinsell
  - Warsaw Concerto (1941)
- Thomas Adès
  - Concerto conciso, Op. 18
  - In Seven Days, Op. 25 (2008)
  - Concerto for Piano and Orchestra, Op. 32 (2018)
- Isaac Albéniz
  - Rapsodia española, Op. 70 (1887)
  - Concierto fantástico in A minor, Op. 78 (1887)
- Eugen d'Albert
  - Piano Concerto No. 1 in B minor, Op. 2 (1883–4)
  - Piano Concerto No. 2 in E, Op. 12 (1892)
- Frangis Ali-Sade
  - Piano Concerto (1972)
- Charles-Valentin Alkan
  - Concerto da Camera No. 1 in A minor, Op. 10, No. 1 (1828)
  - Concerto da Camera No. 2 in C♯ minor, Op. 10, No. 2 (1828)
  - Concerto da Camera No. 3 in C♯ minor (reconstructed H. Macdonald)
  - Piano Concerto Op. 39 (orch. Klindworth)
- Peter Allen
  - "Hurricane Juan" Piano Concerto (2008)
- Eyvind Alnæs
  - Piano Concerto in D major, Op. 27
- Anton Arensky
  - Piano Concerto in F minor, Op. 2 (1883)
  - Fantasia on Russian Folksongs, Op. 48
- Thomas Arne
  - 6 Favourite Concertos for harpsichord, piano, or organ (late 18th century)
- Malcolm Arnold
  - Concerto for Piano Duet and Strings, Op. 32 (1951)
  - Concerto for Phyllis and Cyril, Op. 104 (1969), for 3 hands at 2 pianos (one pianist plays with both hands, the other with only one hand)
  - Fantasy on a Theme of John Field, Op. 116
- Alexander Arutiunian
  - Piano Concertino (1951)
- Daniel Asia
  - Concerto for Piano and Orchestra (1994)
- Kurt Atterberg
  - Piano Concerto in B♭ minor, Op. 37 (1927–35)
- Lera Auerbach
  - Piano Concerto No. 1, Op. 39 (1997–98) (I. River of Loss; 2. Dialogue with Time; 3. Wind of Oblivion; Part 2, Dialogue with Time, can be performed separately as an orchestral piece with the piano being part of the orchestra)
  - Double concerto for violin, piano and orchestra, Op. 40 (1997)

=== B ===
- Kees van Baaren
  - Concertino for Piano and Orchestra (1934)
- Arno Babajanian
  - Concerto for Piano and Orchestra (1944)
  - "Heroic Ballade" for Piano and Orchestra (1950)
- Milton Babbitt
  - Piano Concerto (1985)
  - Piano Concerto No. 2 (1998)
- Carl Philipp Emanuel Bach
  - About 50 keyboard concertos, including one for harpsichord and fortepiano.
- Johann Christian Bach
  - 6 Concertos for Harpsichord, Op. 1
  - 5 Concertos for Harpsichord; Concerto for Harpsichord in F minor
  - 6 Concertos for Keyboard, Op. 7
  - 6 Concertos for Keyboard, Op. 13
- Johann Sebastian Bach (all 1720s-1740s)
  - Harpsichord concertos:
  - BWV 1052 for harpsichord and strings in D minor, presumed to have been transcribed from a lost violin concerto previously written by the composer himself, used again in the Sinfonia and opening chorus of cantata Wir müssen durch viel Trübsal, BWV 146 and the Sinfonia of cantata BWV 188
  - BWV 1053 for harpsichord and strings in E major, probably after a lost oboe concerto
  - BWV 1054 for harpsichord and strings in D major, after his violin concerto in E major, BWV 1042
  - BWV 1055 for harpsichord and strings in A major, after a lost oboe d'amore concerto
  - BWV 1056 for harpsichord and strings in F minor, probably after a lost violin concerto
  - BWV 1057 for harpsichord, 2 recorders and strings in F major, after Brandenburg concerto no.4 in G major, BWV 1049
  - BWV 1058 for harpsichord and strings in G minor, after his violin concerto in A minor, BWV 1041
  - BWV 1050 – Brandenburg concerto no.5 in D major, for harpsichord, flute, violin and strings
  - BWV 1044 for harpsichord, violin, flute and strings in A minor, 1st and 3rd movements after his Prelude and Fugue in A minor for harpsichord, BWV 894 and second movement after the second movement from his trio sonata in D minor for organ, BWV 527
  - BWV 1060 for 2 harpsichords and strings in C minor, after a lost violin and oboe concerto
  - BWV 1061 for 2 harpsichords and strings in C major; the harpsichord parts alone are considered the original concerto 'BWV 1061a' with the string parts added later
  - BWV 1062 for 2 harpsichords and strings in C minor, after his double violin concerto in D minor, BWV 1043
  - BWV 1063 for 3 harpsichords and strings in D minor
  - BWV 1064 for 3 harpsichords and strings in C major, after a lost triple violin concerto
  - BWV 1065 for 4 harpsichords and strings in A minor, after Vivaldi's concerto for 4 violins in B minor, RV 580 (l'estro armonico op.3 no.10, RV580)
- Leonardo Balada
  - Piano Concerto No. 1 (1964)
  - Piano Concerto No. 2, for piano, winds, and percussion (1974)
  - Piano Concerto No. 3 (1999)
- Mily Balakirev
  - Piano Concerto No. 1 in F♯ minor, Op. 1 (1855)
  - Grande Fantaisie on Russian Folk Songs, Op. 4 (1852)
  - Piano Concerto No. 2 in E♭, Op. posth. (completed by Sergei Lyapunov, 1911)
- Samuel Barber
  - Piano Concerto, Op. 38 (1962)
- Henry Barraud
  - Piano Concerto (by 1947)
- Béla Bartók
  - Piano Concerto No. 1 in A, Sz. 83 (1926)
  - Piano Concerto No. 2 in G, Sz. 95 (1930–1)
  - Piano Concerto No. 3 in E, Sz. 119 (1945)
- Arnold Bax
  - Symphonic Variations (1918)
  - Winter Legends (1930)
  - Piano Concertino (1939)
  - Morning Song (1946)
  - Concertante for Orchestra with Piano (Left Hand) (1949)
- Amy Beach
  - Piano Concerto in C♯ minor, Op. 45 (1899)
- Ludwig van Beethoven
  - Piano Concerto in E♭, WoO 4 (1784), written in adolescence
  - Romance Cantabile in E minor, WoO 207 (1786)
  - Rondo for Piano and Orchestra in B♭, WoO 6 (1793)
  - Piano Concerto No. 1 in C, Op. 15 (1798)
  - Piano Concerto No. 2 in B♭, Op. 19 (1795)
  - Piano Concerto No. 3 in C minor, Op. 37 (1800)
  - Triple Concerto for piano, violin, cello and orchestra in C, Op. 56 (1804–5)
  - Piano Concerto No. 4 in G, Op. 58 (1805–6)
  - Piano Concerto in D, Op. 61a (1806), Beethoven's own arrangement of the Violin Concerto
  - Piano Concerto No. 5 in E♭, Op. 73 (1809), the Emperor
  - Fantasy in C minor for Piano, Chorus, and Orchestra, Op. 80 (Choral Fantasy) (1808)
- Victor Bendix
  - Piano Concerto in G minor, Op. 17 (1884)
- Arthur Benjamin
  - Piano Concertino (1928)
  - Concerto Quasi una Fantasia (1949)
- Richard Rodney Bennett
  - Piano Concerto (1968)
- William Sterndale Bennett
  - Piano Concerto No. 1 in D minor, Op. 1
  - Piano Concerto No. 2 in E♭, Op. 4
  - Piano Concerto No. 3 in C minor, Op. 9 (1833)
  - Piano Concerto No. 4 in F minor, Op. 19
  - Piano Concerto No. 5 in F minor
  - Piano Concerto No. 6 in A minor
  - Caprice in E, Op 22
  - Adagio
- Peter Benoit
  - Piano Concerto, Op. 43b
- Flint Juventino Beppe
  - Piano Concerto No. 1 «Anxiety», Op. 24 (1995)
  - Piano Concerto No. 2 «Urge», Op. 44 (1999)
  - Piano Concerto No. 3 «Monster», Op. 45 (1999)
- Luciano Berio
  - Concerto for Two Pianos and Orchestra (1973)
  - Points on a Curve to Find – Piano Concerto (1973–4)
- Lennox Berkeley
  - Piano Concerto in B♭, Op. 29 (1947)
  - Concerto for Two Pianos and Orchestra, Op. 30 (1948)
- Leonard Bernstein
  - Symphony No. 2 The Age of Anxiety (1948, rev. 1965), after W. H. Auden
- Franz Berwald
  - Piano Concerto in D (1855)
- Adolphe Biarent
  - Rapsodie Wallone (1910)
- Boris Blacher
  - Piano Concerto No. 1 (1947)
  - Piano Concerto No. 2 (In variable metres) (1952)
  - Variations on a Theme of Muzio Clementi (1961)
- Howard Blake
  - Piano Concerto
- Arthur Bliss
  - Piano Concerto in B♭, Op. 58 (1939)
- Ernest Bloch
  - Concerto symphonique in B minor (1947–8)
  - Scherzo fantastique (1948)
- Felix Blumenfeld
  - Allegro de concert in A major, Op. 7 (1889)
- Emil Bohnke
  - Concerto in D minor for piano and orchestra, Op. 14 (1925)
- François-Adrien Boieldieu
  - Piano Concerto in F major
- Sergei Bortkiewicz
  - Piano Concerto, Op. 1 (destroyed, material partly used in the Piano Concerto No. 2)
  - Piano Concerto No. 1 in B♭, Op. 16 (1913)
  - Piano Concerto No. 2 in E♭, Op. 28, for left hand alone, written for Paul Wittgenstein (1924)
  - Piano Concerto No. 3 in C minor, Per Aspera ad Astra, Op. 32 (1927)
  - Russian Rhapsody
- Dmitry Bortniansky
  - Piano Concerto in C major
- Henriëtte Bosmans
  - Concertino for Piano and Orchestra (1928)
- York Bowen
  - Piano Concerto No. 1 in E♭ Op. 11 (1903)
  - Piano Concerto No. 2 in D minor ("Concertstück") Op. 17 (1905)
  - Piano Concerto No. 3 in G minor ("Fantaisie") Op. 23 (1907)
  - Piano Concerto No. 4 in A minor Op. 88 (1929)
- Johannes Brahms
  - Piano Concerto No. 1 in D minor, Op. 15 (1859)
  - Piano Concerto No. 2 in B♭, Op. 83 (1881)
- Frank Bridge
  - Fantasm (1931)
- Benjamin Britten
  - Piano Concerto in D, Op. 13 (1938, revised 1945)
  - Diversions on a Theme for Piano Left Hand and Orchestra, Op. 21 (1940), for Paul Wittgenstein
  - Scottish Ballad, Op. 26, for two pianos and orchestra (1941)
- Hans Bronsart von Schellendorff
  - Piano Concerto in F♯ minor, Op. 10
- Stephen Brown
  - Piano Concerto, The Red Hot (1995–96)
- Max Bruch
  - Concerto in A♭ minor for two pianos, Op. 88a
- Ignaz Brüll
  - Piano Concerto No. 1 in F, Op. 10 (1860–1)
  - Piano Concerto No. 2 in C, Op. 24 (1868)
  - Rhapsodie in D minor, Op. 65 (1892)
  - Andante and Allegro, Op. 88
- Fritz Brun
  - Piano Concerto in A (1946)
- Norbert Burgmüller
  - Piano Concerto in F♯ minor, Op. 1 (1829)
- Alan Bush
  - Piano Concerto, Op. 18, with baritone and male choir in last movement (1938)
- Ferruccio Busoni
  - Piano Concerto in D, Op. 17, for piano and string orchestra (1878)
  - Konzert-Fantasie, Op. 29 (1888–9)
  - Introduction and Allegro, Op. 31a (1890)
  - Konzert-Fantasie, Op. 32 (1888–89)
  - Piano Concerto in C, Op. 39 (1902–4), with male chorus
  - Indian Fantasy, Op. 44
  - Introduction et scherzo (1882–4)
  - Konzertstück in D, Op. 31a (1890)
  - Romanza e scherzoso, Op. 54 (1921), published together with Op. 31a as "Concertino"
- Garrett Byrnes
  - Concerto for Piano and Chamber Orchestra (2003)
- Nimrod Borenstein
  - Concerto for Piano and Orchestra, Op. 91 (2021)

=== C ===
- John Cage
  - Concerto for Prepared Piano and Orchestra (1951)
  - Concert for Piano and Orchestra (1957–58)
  - Fourteen, for bowed piano and thirteen players (1990)
- Charles Camilleri
  - Piano Concerto No. 1, Mediterranean (1948)
  - Piano Concerto No. 2, Maqam (1968)
  - Piano Concerto No. 3, Leningrad (1984)
- Joseph Canteloube
  - Pièces françaises (1934–5)
- John Alden Carpenter
  - Concertino for Piano and Orchestra (1920)
- Elliott Carter
  - Piano Concerto (1965)
  - Double Concerto for Harpsichord and Piano with Two Chamber Orchestras (1961)
- Doreen Carwithen
  - Concerto for Piano and Strings (1948)
- Robert Casadesus
  - Concerto for two pianos
- Alfredo Casella
  - Scarlattiana, divertimento on music of Domenico Scarlatti for piano and small orchestra, Op. 44 (1926)
- Alexis de Castillon
  - Piano Concerto in D major, Op. 12
- Cécile Chaminade
  - Konzertstück in C♯ minor, Op. 40 (1896?, fp 1908)
- Claude Champagne
  - Concerto for Piano and Orchestra (1948)
- Carlos Chávez
  - Piano Concerto (1938–40, revised 1969)
- Qigang Chen
  - Er Huang for Piano and Orchestra (2009)
- Frédéric Chopin
  - Variations on "Là ci darem la mano" in B♭ major, Op. 2 (1827)
  - Piano Concerto No. 1 in E minor, Op. 11 (1830)
  - Fantasy on Polish Airs in A major, Op. 13 (1828)
  - Rondo à la Krakowiak in F major, Op. 14 (1828)
  - Piano Concerto No. 2 in F minor, Op. 21 (1829–1830)
  - Andante spianato et Grande Polonaise brillante in E♭ major, Op. 22
- Muzio Clementi
  - Piano Concerto in C major (c. 1790)
- Paul Constantinescu
  - Piano Concerto (1952)
- Aaron Copland
  - Piano Concerto (1926)
- John Corigliano
  - Piano Concerto (1968)
- Henry Cowell
  - Piano Concerto (1929)
- Carl Czerny
  - Piano Concerto in D minor
  - 'Grand' Piano Concerto in E♭ major
  - Piano Concerto in F, Op. 28
  - Piano Concertino in C, Op. 78
  - Piano Concerto in C for four hands, Op. 153
  - Piano Concerto in A minor, Op. 214
  - Piano Concertino in C, Op. 210
  - 3 unpublished concertos, mentioned in Mandyczewski

=== D ===
- Luigi Dallapiccola
  - Piano Concerto
- Franz Danzi
  - Piano Concerto in E♭ major
- Peter Maxwell Davies
  - Piano Concerto (1997)
- Claude Debussy
  - Printemps, L. 61 (1887), symphonic suite for choir, piano, and orchestra
  - Fantaisie for Piano and Orchestra, L. 73 (1889–90)
- Arthur De Greef
  - Piano Concerto No. 1 in C minor (1914)
  - Piano Concerto No. 2 in B♭ minor (1930)
- Frederick Delius
  - Piano Concerto in C minor (1897–1906)
- Peter Dickinson
  - Piano Concerto (1984)
- Issay Dobrowen
  - Piano Concerto in C♯ minor, Op. 20 (1926)
- Ernő Dohnányi
  - Piano Concerto No. 1 in E minor, Op. 5 (1897–8)
  - Variations on a Nursery Tune, Op. 25 (1914)
  - Piano Concerto No. 2 in B minor, Op. 42 (1946–7)
- Felix Draeseke
  - Piano Concerto in E♭, Op. 36 (1885–6)
- Alexander Dreyschock
  - Morceau de Concert in C minor, Op. 27
  - Piano Concerto in D minor, Op. 137
- Marcel Dupré
  - Fantasie, Op. 8 (1919?)
- František Xaver Dušek
  - Piano concerto in D major
  - Piano Concerto in E♭ major
- Jan Ladislav Dussek
  - Thirteen solo piano concertos including
    - Piano Concerto in B♭ major, Op. 22, Craw 97
  - Concerto for Two Pianos in B♭ major, Op. 63 No. 10
- Antonín Dvořák
  - Piano Concerto in G minor, Op. 33 (1876)
- George Dyson
  - Concerto Leggiero for Piano and String Orchestra

=== E ===
- Petr Eben
  - Piano Concerto (1960–1)
- Dennis Eberhard
  - Piano Concerto 'Shadow of the Swan'
- Sophie Carmen Eckhardt-Gramatté
  - Three piano concertos
- Ross Edwards
  - Piano Concerto in A (1982) ()
- Gottfried von Einem
  - Piano Concerto No. 1
- Edward Elgar
  - Piano Concerto (incomplete, completed by Robert Walker) (begun 1913, sketches continue until 1934)
- Keith Emerson
  - Piano Concerto No. 1 (1977)
- Einar Englund
  - Piano Concerto No. 1 (1955)
  - Piano Concerto No. 2 (1974)
- Eduard Erdmann
  - Piano Concerto (1928)
- Iván Erőd
  - Piano Concerto op. 19 (1975)
- Andrei Eshpai
  - Piano Concerto No. 1 (published 1957)
  - Piano Concerto No. 2

=== F ===
- Manuel de Falla
  - Nights in the Gardens of Spain (Noches en los jardines de España, 1916)
- Ernest Farrar
  - Variations for Piano and Orchestra, Op. 25
- Gabriel Fauré
  - Ballade in F♯, Op. 19 (1881)
  - Fantaisie in G, Op. 111 (1919)
- Samuil Feinberg
  - Piano Concerto No. 1 in C major, Op. 20 (1931)
  - Piano Concerto No. 2 in D major, Op. 36 (1945)
  - Piano Concerto No. 3 in C minor, Op. 44 (1947/51)
- Morton Feldman
  - Piano and Orchestra (1975)
- Howard Ferguson
  - Piano Concerto in D (1951)
- Lorenzo Ferrero
  - Concerto for Piano and Orchestra (1991)
  - Concerto for Piano and Orchestra No. 2 (2007)
- Richard Festinger
  - Concerto for Piano and Nine Instruments (2007)
- John Field
  - Piano Concerto No. 1 in E♭, H. 27 (1799)
  - Piano Concerto No. 2 in A♭, H. 31 (1811)
  - Piano Concerto No. 3 in E♭, H. 32 (1811)
  - Piano Concerto No. 4 in E♭, H. 28 (1814, revised 1819)
  - Piano Concerto No. 5 in C, H. 39 (1817), l'Incedie par l'Orage
  - Piano Concerto No. 6 in C, H. 49 (1819, revised 1820)
  - Piano Concerto No. 7 in C minor, H. 58 (1822, revised 1822–32)
  - Fantaisie sur un air favorite de mon ami N.P. in A minor, H. 4A (1822), orchestral part now lost
  - Serenade in B♭, H. 37
  - Grande pastorale in E, H. 54A (1832), orchestral part now lost
- Gerald Finzi
  - Eclogue for Piano and Strings, Op. 10
  - Grand Fantasia and Toccata, Op. 38
- Ben Folds
  - Piano Concerto
- Joseph Dillon Ford
  - Concerto for Harpsichord (2006)
- Lukas Foss
  - Piano Concerto No. 1 (1939–43)
  - Piano Concerto No. 2 (1951)
- Jean Françaix
  - Concertino in G major (1932)
  - Concerto (1936)
- César Franck
  - Variations brillantes sur la ronde favorite de Gustave III (Auber) (1834–5)
  - Piano Concerto No. 2 in B minor, Op. 11 (juvenilia, 1835)
  - Symphonic Variations, FWV 46 (1885)
  - Les Djinns, FWV 45 (1884), symphonic poem
- Eduard Franck
  - Piano Concerto No. 1 in D minor, Op. 13 (1849)
  - Piano Concerto No. 2 in C major (1879)
  - Concerto for two pianos in C major (1852)
- Richard Franck
  - Piano Concerto No. 1 in D minor (1880)
  - Piano Concerto No. 2 in A major (1881)
  - Piano concerto No. 3 in E minor, Op. 50 (1910)
- Peter Fribbins
  - Piano Concerto (2010 - 2011)
- Gunnar de Frumerie
  - Variations and Fugue for Piano and Orchestra (1932)
- Robert Fuchs
  - Piano Concerto in B♭ minor, Op. 27 (1879–80)
- Beat Furrer
  - Concerto (2007)
- Wilhelm Furtwängler
  - Symphonic Piano Concerto in B minor (1936–7)

=== G ===
- Niels Wilhelm Gade
  - Symphony No.5 in D minor with solo piano, Op.25 (1852)
- Kyle Gann
  - Sunken City (Concerto for piano and winds) (2007)
- Antonio García
  - ... And Silence Again (concertino for piano and chamber orchestra) (2018)
- Roberto Gerhard
  - Piano Concerto (1951)
  - Concerto for Piano and Strings (1961)
  - Concerto for harpsichord, percussion and strings (mid 20th century)
- George Gershwin
  - Piano Concerto in F (1925)
  - Rhapsody in Blue (1924)
  - Second Rhapsody (1934)
  - Variations on "I Got Rhythm" (1934)
- Alberto Ginastera
  - Piano Concerto No. 1, Op. 28 (1961)
  - Piano Concerto No. 2, Op. 39 (1972)
- Peggy Glanville-Hicks
  - Etruscan Concerto
- Philip Glass
  - Piano Concerto No. 1, Tirol (2000)
  - Piano Concerto No. 2, After Lewis and Clark (2004)
  - Concerto for Harpsichord and Chamber Orchestra (2002)
  - Piano Concerto No. 3 (2017)
- Alexander Glazunov
  - Piano Concerto No. 1 in F minor, Op. 92 (1911)
  - Piano Concerto No. 2 in B, Op. 100
- Benjamin Godard
  - Piano Concerto No. 1 in A minor, Op. 31 (1879)
  - Piano Concerto No. 2 in G minor, Op. 148 (1899)
  - Introduction and Allegro, Op. 49 (1880)
- Roger Goeb
  - Concerto for Piano and Orchestra (1954)
  - Fantasy for Piano and String Orchestra (1955)
- Alexander Goedicke
  - Piano Concerto, Op. 11 (1900)
  - Konzertstück in D, Op. 11 (1900)
- Hermann Goetz
  - Piano Concerto in E♭ (1861)
  - Piano Concerto in B♭, Op. 18 (1867)
- Otar Gordeli
  - Piano Concerto in C minor (1951)
  - Piano Concerto in C minor, Op. 2 (1952)
- Geoffrey Gordon
  - Saint Blue (Double concerto for piano, trumpet and string orchestra, after works by Kandinsky) (2014) ()
- Henryk Górecki
  - Harpsichord Concerto (1980)
- Louis Moreau Gottschalk
  - Grande Tarantelle, Op. 67 (1858–64)
- Charles Gounod
  - Concerto for Piano pédalier and Orchestra in E♭
  - Fantaisie sur l'hymne national russe for Piano pédalier and Orchestra (1886)
  - Suite Concertante for Piano pédalier and Orchestra in A (1890)
- Paul Graener
  - Piano Concerto in A minor Op. 72
- Enrique Granados
  - Suite de navidad (1914–5), arranged from opera La cieguecita de Betania
- Edvard Grieg
  - Piano Concerto in A minor, Op. 16 (1868)
- Helen Grime
  - Piano Concerto (2017)
- Ferde Grofé
  - Concerto for Piano and Orchestra in D (1958)
- Heinz Karl Gruber
  - Piano Concerto (2014–2016)
- Jorge Grundman
  - Concerto for Piano and String Orchestra. The Toughest Decision of God Op. 63 (2018)
- Camargo Guarnieri
  - Piano Concerto No. 1
  - Piano Concerto No. 2
  - Piano Concerto No. 3
  - Piano Concerto No. 4
  - Piano Concerto No. 5
  - Piano Concerto No. 6
- Emilia Gubitosi
  - Concerto for Piano and Orchestra (1943)

=== H ===
- Reynaldo Hahn
  - Piano Concerto in E (1930)
- Hermann Haller
  - Concerto for Piano and Orchestra (1959)
  - Concerto No. 2 for Piano and String Orchestra (1962)
- Ilmari Hannikainen
  - Piano Concerto in B♭ minor (1917)
- Howard Hanson
  - Piano Concerto in G, Op. 36 (1948)
- Lou Harrison
  - Piano Concerto (1985)
- Hamilton Harty
  - Piano Concerto in B minor (1922)
- Fumio Hayasaka
  - Piano Concerto (1948)
- Joseph Haydn
  - Concerto in C, Hob. XVIII/1 (1756)
  - Concerto in D, Hob. XVIII/2 (1767)
  - Concerto in F, Hob. XVIII/3 (c. 1765)
  - Concerto in G, Hob. XVIII/4 (1770)
  - Concerto in C, Hob. XVIII/5 (before 1763)
  - Concerto in F, Hob. XVIII/6, for piano, violin and strings (before 1766)
  - Concerto in F, Hob. XVIII/7 (before 1766)
  - Concerto in C, Hob. XVIII/8 (1766)
  - Concerto in G, Hob. XVIII/9 (before 1767)
  - Concerto in C, Hob. XVIII/10 (1771)
  - Concerto in D, Hob. XVIII/11 (before 1782) – this is the one usually known as the Haydn Concerto
- Christopher Headington
  - Piano Concerto
- Adolf von Henselt
  - Piano Concerto in F minor, Op. 16 (1839–47)
  - Variations de Concert on Quand je quittai la Normandie from Meyerbeer's Robert le Diable, Op. 11
- Hans Werner Henze
  - Piano Concerto No. 1 (1950)
  - Piano Concerto No. 2 (1967)
  - Tristan, preludes for piano, electronic tapes and orchestra (1973)
  - Requiem for piano and chamber orchestra (1990)
- Henri Herz
  - Piano Concerto No. 1 in A, Op. 34 (1828)
  - Piano Concerto No. 2 in C minor, Op. 74 (1834)
  - Piano Concerto No. 3 in D minor, Op. 87 (1835)
  - Piano Concerto No. 4 in E, Op. 131 (1843)
  - Piano Concerto No. 5 in F minor, Op. 180 (1854)
  - Piano Concerto No. 6 in A minor, Op. 192 (1858), with chorus
  - Piano Concerto No. 7 in B minor, Op. 207 (1864)
  - Piano Concerto No. 8 in A♭, Op. 218 (1873)
- Jennifer Higdon
  - Piano Concerto (2006)
- Paul Hindemith
  - Klaviermusik mit Orchester, Op. 29 (1923, for left hand only)
  - Kammermusik II Concerto for piano and twelve solo instruments, Op. 36/1 (1924)
  - Concert Music for Piano, Brass and Two Harps, Op. 49 (1930)
  - The Four Temperaments (1940)
  - Piano Concerto (1945)
- Alun Hoddinott
  - Concerto for Piano, Winds and Percussion, Op. 19 (1961)
  - Concerto No. 2, Op. 21 (1960)
  - Concerto No. 3, Op. 44 (1966)
- Josef Hofmann
  - Chromatikon, for piano and orchestra
- Joseph Holbrooke
  - Piano Concerto No. 1, Op. 52 The Song of Gwyn ap Nudd (1906–8)
  - Piano Concerto No. 2, Op. 100 L'Orient
- Arthur Honegger
  - Concertino (1924)
- Alan Hovhaness
  - Lousadzak for piano and string orchestra, Op. 48 (1944)
- Herbert Howells
  - Piano Concerto No. 2 in C minor (1925)
- Johann Nepomuk Hummel
  - Piano Concerto in A, s4 / WoO. 24 (1790s)
  - Piano Concerto in A, s5 / WoO. 24a (1790s)
  - Piano Concerto in C, Op. 34a (1811)
  - Concertino in G, Op. 73
  - Piano Concerto in A minor, Op. 85 (1821)
  - Piano Concerto in B minor, Op. 89 (1819)
  - Piano Concerto in E, Op. 110, Les Adieux (1826)
  - Piano Concerto in A♭, Op. 113 (1830)
  - Piano Concerto in F, Op. posth. 1 (1839)
  - Rondeau Brillant in A, Op. 56
  - Rondo Brillant on a Russian Folk Theme, Op. 98 (1822)
  - Variations Brillantes "Das Fest der Handwerken", Op. 115 (1830)
  - Oberons Zauberhorn: Grosse Fantasie, Op. 116 (1829)
  - Gesellschafts-Rondo in D, Op. 117
  - Le Retour de Londres – Grand Rondeau Brillant, Op. 127 (1830)
  - Double Concerto in G, Op. 17 for piano and violin
- William Hurlstone
  - Piano Concerto in D
- Henry Holden Huss
  - Piano Concerto in B, Op. 10

=== I ===
- Vincent d'Indy
  - Symphony on a French Mountain Air (Symphonie sur un chant montagnard français), Op. 25 (1886)
  - Triple Concerto for Piano, Flute, Cello and String Orchestra, Op. 89 (1927)
- John Ireland
  - Piano Concerto in E♭ (1930)
  - Legend (1933)
- Charles Ives
  - Emerson Concerto, reconstructed by David G. Porter from Ives' drafts of the Emerson Overture for Piano and Orchestra

=== J ===
- Gordon Jacob
  - Concerto for Three Hands
- Marie Jaëll
  - Piano Concerto No. 1 in D minor (1877)
  - Piano Concerto No. 2 in C minor (1884)
- Leoš Janáček
  - Concertino (1925)
  - Capriccio for piano left hand, flute and brass ensemble 'Vzdor' (1926)
- André Jolivet
  - Piano Concerto (1950)

=== K ===
- Dmitry Kabalevsky
  - Piano Concerto No. 1 in A minor, Op. 9 (1928)
  - Piano Concerto No. 2 in G minor, Op. 23 (1935)
  - Piano Concerto No. 3 in D major, Op. 50 'Youth Concerto' (1952)
  - Piano Concerto No. 4 in C major, Op. 99 'Prague' (1975)
- Robert Kahn
  - Konzertstücke, Op. 74 (1920)
- Friedrich Kalkbrenner
  - Piano Concerto No. 1 in D minor, Op. 61 (1823)
  - Piano Concerto No. 2 in E minor, Op. 85 (1826)
  - Bravura Variations on "God Save the King", Op. 99 (1828)
  - Adagio ed allegro di bravura, Op. 102 (1828)
  - Piano Concerto No. 3 in A minor, Op. 107 (1829)
  - Le rêve, Grande fantaisie pour le piano forte avec accompagnement d'orchestre ad libitum, Op. 113 (c. 1831)
  - Grand Concerto for two pianos, Op. 125 (1833)
  - Piano Concerto No. 4 in A♭ major, Op. 127 (1835)
- Nikolai Kapustin
  - Concertino for Piano and Orchestra, Op. 1 (1957)
  - Piano Concerto No. 1 in E♭ major, Op. 2 (1961)
  - Piano Concerto No. 2 in C major, Op. 14 (1974)
  - Piano Concerto No. 3 in F minor, Op. 48 (1985)
  - Piano Concerto No. 4 in C minor, Op. 56 (1989)
  - Piano Concerto No. 5 in E♭ major, Op. 72 (1993)
  - Piano Concerto No. 6 in G major, Op. 74 (1993)
  - Toccata for Piano and Orchestra, Op. 8 (1964)
  - Intermezzo for Piano and Orchestra, Op. 13 (1968)
  - Nocturne for Piano and Orchestra, Op. 16 (1972)
  - Etude for Piano and Orchestra, Op. 19 (1974)
  - Nocturne for Piano and Orchestra, Op. 20 (1974)
  - Concert Rhapsody for Piano and Orchestra, Op. 25 (1976)
  - Scherzo for Piano and Orchestra, Op. 29 (1978)
  - Concerto for Two Pianos and Percussion, Op. 104 (2002)
- Shigeru Kan-no
  - Piano Concerto No.1 (1997)
  - Piano Concerto No.2 (1999)
  - Piano Concerto No.3 (2006)
- Hugo Kaun (1863–1932)
  - Piano Concerto No. 1 E♭ minor, Op. 50
  - Piano Concerto No. 2 C minor, Op. 115 (1925)
- Nigel Keay
  - Diffractions for Piano and Orchestra (1987) ()
- Aram Khachaturian
  - Concert-Rhapsody in D♭, Op. 102 (1967)
  - Piano Concerto in D♭ (1936)
- Tikhon Khrennikov
  - Piano Concerto No. 1 in F, Op. 1 (1933)
  - Piano Concerto No. 2 in C, Op. 21 (1972)
  - Piano Concerto No. 3 in C, Op. 28 (1983/84)
- Friedrich Kiel
  - Piano Concerto in B♭, Op. 30 (1864)
- Wojciech Kilar
  - Symphony Concertante, for piano and orchestra (Symphony No. 2) (1956)
  - Piano Concerto No. 1 (1997)
  - Piano Concerto No. 2 (2011)
- Reginald King
  - Fantasie for Piano and Orchestra (1946)
- Charles Koechlin
  - Ballade for Piano and Orchestra
- Siegfried Kohler
  - Piano Concerto Op. 46 (1971–72)
- Erich Wolfgang Korngold
  - Piano Concerto in C♯ for the left hand, Op. 17 (1923, commissioned by Paul Wittgenstein)
- Leopold Kozeluch
  - Concerto for Two Pianos in B♭ major
- Ernst Krenek
  - Piano Concerto No. 1 in F♯, Op. 18 (1923)
  - Piano Concerto No. 2, Op. 81 (1937)
  - Piano Concerto No. 3, Op. 107 (1946)
  - Piano Concerto No. 4 (1950)
  - Concerto for Two Pianos (1951)
- Eduard Künneke
  - Piano Concerto No. 1 in A♭ major, op. 36
- Friedrich Kuhlau
  - Piano Concerto in C, Op. 7 (1810)
- Theodor Kullak
  - Piano Concerto in C minor, Op. 55 (1850)
- György Kurtág
  - Op. 27/1 – ... quasi una fantasia ... for piano and chamber ensemble (1987–88)
  - Op. 27/2 – Double Concerto for piano, cello and two chamber ensembles (1989–90)

=== L ===
- Sophie Lacaze
  - Concerto n°1 for piano and string orchestra (2002)
- Helmut Lachenmann
  - Ausklang: Piano Concerto in F (1985)
- Édouard Lalo
  - Piano Concerto in F minor (1889)
- Constant Lambert
  - The Rio Grande, for alto, piano, chorus, brass, strings and percussion (1927)
  - Concerto for piano and nine players (1931)
- Marcel Landowski
  - Piano Concerto No. 2
- Shawn Lane
  - Piano Concertino: Transformation of Themes (1992)
- Philip Lasser
  - The Circle and the Child (2012)
- Henri Lazarof
  - Tableaux (after Kandinsky) for Piano and Orchestra
- Ton de Leeuw
  - Danses sacrées (1990)
- Dieter Lehnhoff
  - Piano Concerto No. 1, Op. 25 (2005)
  - Piano Concerto No. 2, Op. 29 (2007)
- Kenneth Leighton
  - Piano Concerto No. 1, Op. 11 (1951)
  - Piano Concerto No. 2, Op. 37 (1960)
  - Piano Concerto No. 3, Op. 57 (1969)
- Artur Lemba
  - Piano Concerto No. 1 in G major (1905)
  - Piano Concerto No. 2 in E minor (1931)
  - Piano Concerto No. 3 in F minor (1945)
  - Piano Concerto No. 4 in B major (1955)
  - Piano Concerto No. 5 (1960)
- Theodor Leschetizky
  - Piano Concerto in C minor, Op. 9
- Lowell Liebermann
  - Piano Concerto No. 1, Op. 12 (1983)
  - Piano Concerto No. 2, Op. 36 (1992)
  - Piano Concerto No. 3, Op. 95 (2006)
  - Rhapsody on a Theme of Paganini Op.72 (2001)
- Peter Lieberson
  - Piano Concerto No. 1 (1983)
  - Red Garuda for piano and orchestra (1999)
  - Piano Concerto No. 3 (2003)
- György Ligeti
  - Piano Concerto (1988)
- Magnus Lindberg
  - Piano Concerto No. 1 (1994)
  - Piano Concerto No. 2 (2012)
- Dinu Lipatti
  - Concertino Op. 3
  - Romanian Dances for Piano and Orchestra
- Franz Liszt
  - Piano Concerto No. 1 in E♭ major, S. 124 (1835)
  - Piano Concerto No. 2 in A major, S. 125 (1839)
  - Piano Concerto No. 3 in E♭ major, Op. posth, S. 125a
  - Totentanz, S. 126 (1838–49, revised 1853 and 1859)
  - Grande symphonic Fantasie on themes from Berlioz's 'Lelio', S. 120
  - Fantasy on a Theme from Beethoven's The Ruins of Athens, S. 122 (1848–52)
  - Malediction for piano and string orchestra, S. 121
  - De Profundis – Psaume instrumental, S. 121a
  - Fantasy on Hungarian Folk Songs, S. 123 (1852)
  - Grand solo de concert, S. 365 (prepared by Leslie Howard)
  - Concerto pathétique in E minor, S. 365a
  - Hexaméron, S. 365b (orch. competed by Leslie Howard)
  - Transcription of Schubert's Wanderer Fantasy, S. 366 (1850–51)
  - Transcription of Weber's Polonaise brillante, S. 367 (1850–51)
  - Rapsodie espagnole, S. 254 (orch. Busoni)
- Henry Litolff
  - Concerto Symphonique No. 1 in D minor, now lost
  - Concerto Symphonique No. 2 in B minor, Op. 22
  - Concerto Symphonique No. 3 in E♭, Op. 45 (1846)
  - Concerto Symphonique No. 4 in D minor, Op. 102
  - Concerto Symphonique No. 5 in C minor, Op. 123 (1870)
- George Lloyd
  - Piano Concerto No. 1 ('Scapegoat')
  - Piano Concerto No. 2
  - Piano Concerto No. 3
- Carl Loewe
  - Piano Concerto No. 2 in A
- Nikolai Lopatnikoff
  - Concerto for two Pianos and Orchestra (1949–50)
- Bent Lorentzen
  - Piano Concerto
- Witold Lutosławski
  - Piano Concerto (1987)
  - Variations on a Theme by Paganini (1978, orig. written 1941 for two pianos)
- Sergei Lyapunov
  - Piano Concerto No. 1 in E♭ minor, Op. 4 (1886)
  - Piano Concerto No. 2 in E major, Op. 38 (1909)
  - Rhapsody on Ukrainian Themes, Op. 28

=== M ===
- Edward MacDowell
  - Piano Concerto No. 1 in A minor, Op. 15 (1882)
  - Piano Concerto No. 2 in D minor, Op. 23 (1885)
- Alexander Mackenzie
  - Scottish Concerto in G major, Op. 55 (1897)
- James MacMillan
  - The Berserking for piano and orchestra (1990)
  - Piano Concerto No. 2 (2003)
  - Piano Concerto No. 3 (2008)
- Frederik Magle
  - Symphonic Lego Fantasia for piano and orchestra (1995–96)
- Gian Francesco Malipiero
  - Six Piano Concertos (1934–1964)
  - Dialoghi VII (Concerto) for Two Pianos and Orchestra (1956)
- Otto Malling
  - Piano Concerto in C minor Op. 43 (1890)
- Andrew March
  - Piano Concerto No. 1 (2013–19)
- Frank Martin
  - Piano Concerto No. 1 in F minor (1934)
  - Piano Concerto No. 2 (1968–69)
  - Harpsichord Concerto (1951–52)
  - Ballade for piano and orchestra
  - Petite symphonie concertante for piano, harp, harpsichord and two string orchestras (1945)
- Bohuslav Martinů
  - Piano Concerto No. 1 (1925)
  - Concertino for piano left hand and chamber orchestra, Op. 173 (1926)
  - Piano Concerto No. 2 (1934)
  - Concertino (1938)
  - Concerto for Two Pianos (1943)
  - Piano Concerto No. 3 (1948)
  - Piano Concerto No. 4 (1956, Incantations)
  - Piano Concerto No. 5 (1957, Fantasia concertante) (see )
  - Harpsichord Concerto (1935)
  - Toccata e due Canzoni (1946)
  - Concertino (1933) for piano, violin, cello and string orchestra
  - Double Concerto for 2 String Orchestras, Piano and Timpani (1938)
  - Sinfonietta Giocosa (1940)
  - Sinfonietta La Jolla (1950)
- Giuseppe Martucci
  - Piano Concerto in D minor Op. 40
  - Piano Concerto in B♭ minor Op. 66 (1884–85)
- Joseph Marx
  - Romantisches Klavierkonzert in E
  - Castelli Romani (1930)
- Jules Massenet
  - Piano Concerto in E♭
- André Mathieu
  - Concertino No. 1
  - Concertino No. 2
  - Concerto No. 3, Quebec (1943)
  - Concerto No.4 in E minor (1947)
  - Romantic Rhapsody for Piano and Orchestra
- John McCabe
  - Piano Concerto No. 1, Op. 43 (1966)
  - Piano Concerto No. 2
  - Piano Concertino (1968)
  - Piano Concerto No. 3, Dialogues (1976)
- Nikolai Medtner
  - Piano Concerto No. 1 in C minor, Op. 33 (1914–18)
  - Piano Concerto No. 2 in C minor, Op. 50 (1920–27)
  - Piano Concerto No. 3 in E minor, Op. 60 (1940–43)
- Henryk Melcer-Szczawiński
  - Concerto for Piano and Orchestra No. 1 in E minor (1895)
  - Concerto for Piano and Orchestra No. 2 in C minor (1898)
- Felix Mendelssohn
  - Piano Concerto in A minor (1822)
  - Concerto in E major for two pianos (1823)
  - Concerto in A♭ major for two pianos (1824)
  - Piano Concerto No. 1 in G minor, Op. 25 (1831)
  - Piano Concerto No. 2 in D minor, Op. 40 (1837)
  - Piano Concerto No. 3 in E minor, Op. Posth. (1844)
  - Capriccio Brillant in B minor, Op. 22 (1832)
  - Rondo Brillant in E♭ major, Op. 29 (1834)
  - Serenade and Allegro giocoso in B minor, Op. 43 (1838)
  - Concerto for Violin and Piano in D minor (1823)
- Peter Mennin
  - Concerto for Piano and Orchestra (1957)
- Giancarlo Menotti
  - Piano Concerto in F
- Olivier Messiaen
  - Turangalîla-Symphonie, solo piano, Ondes Martenot and orchestra (1946–48)
  - Réveil des Oiseaux ("Dawn chorus"), solo piano and orchestra (1953)
  - Oiseaux exotiques ("Exotic birds"), solo piano and orchestra (1955–56)
  - Sept haïkaï ("Seven haikus"), solo piano and orchestra (1962)
  - Couleurs de la cité céleste ("Colours of the Celestial City"), solo piano and ensemble (1963)
  - Un vitrail et des oiseaux ("Stained-glass window and birds"), piano solo, brass, wind and percussion (1986)
  - La ville d'en-haut ("The city on high"), piano solo, brass, wind and percussion (1987)
  - Concert à quatre, for four soloists – piano, cello, flute, oboe – and orchestra (1990–91, completed Loriod and Benjamin)
  - Trois petites Liturgies de la Présence Divine (1943–44)
  - La Transfiguration de Notre Seigneur Jésus (1965–69), for solo piano, solo cello, solo flute, solo clarinet, solo xylorimba, solo vibraphone, large 10-part choir and large orchestra
- Peter Mieg
  - Concerto for 2 pianos and orchestra (1939–41)
  - Piano Concerto No. 1 (1947)
  - Piano Concerto No. 2 (1961)
  - Concerto pour piano à quatre mains et orchestre à cordes (1980)
- Darius Milhaud
  - Piano Concerto No. 1, Op. 127 (1933)
  - Piano Concerto No. 2, Op. 225 (1941)
  - Concerto for 2 (or 3) Pianos, Op. 228 (1941)
  - Piano Concerto No. 3, Op. 270 (1946)
  - Piano Concerto No. 4, Op. 295 (1949)
  - Concertino d'automne, for 2 pianos and 8 instruments, Op. 309 (1951)
  - Piano Concerto No. 5, Op. 346 (1955)
  - Ballade, Op. 61 (1920)
  - 5 Études, Op. 63 (1920)
  - Le Carnaval d'Aix, Op. 83b (1926)
  - Fantaisie pastorale, Op. 188 (1938)
  - Suite, Op. 300, for 2 (or 3) Pianos and Orchestra (1950)
  - Suite concertante, Op. 278b (1952)
- Eric Moe
  - Kicking and Screaming for piano and 10 players (1994)
- E. J. Moeran
  - Rhapsody in F♯ minor for Piano and Orchestra (1943)
- Robert Moevs
  - Concerto Grosso for Piano, Percussion, and Orchestra (1960–68)
- Richard Mohaupt
  - Concerto for Piano and Orchestra (1938, rev. 1942)
- Georg Matthias Monn
  - Harpsichord concerto in G minor (18th Century)
  - Harpsichord concerto in D major (18th Century)
- Xavier Montsalvatge
  - Concerto Breve
- Ennio Morricone
  - Musica for piano and string orchestra (1954)
- Ignaz Moscheles
  - Piano Concerto No. 1 in F, Op. 45 (1818)
  - Piano Concerto No. 2 in E♭, Op. 56
  - Piano Concerto No. 3 in G minor, Op. 58
  - Piano Concerto No. 4 in E, Op. 64 (1823)
  - Piano Concerto No. 5 in C, Op. 87 (1826–31)
  - Piano Concerto No. 6 in B♭, Op. 90 Fantastique (1834)
  - Piano Concerto No. 7 in C minor, Op. 93 Pathétique (1835)
  - Piano Concerto No. 8 in D, Pastorale, Op. 96 (1838) – the orchestral parts for this Concerto have been lost
  - Recollections of Ireland, Op. 69
  - Anticipations of Scotland: A Grand Fantasia, Op. 70
- Mihály Mosonyi
  - Piano Concerto in E minor
- Moritz Moszkowski
  - Piano Concerto No. 1 in B minor, Op. 3
  - Piano Concerto No. 2 in E Major, Op.59
- Wolfgang Amadeus Mozart – wrote twenty-seven numbered and three unnumbered concertos, of which Nos. 1–4 and K. 107 are arrangements of sonata movements by other composers.
  - Piano Concerto No. 1 in F, K. 37 (1767)
  - Piano Concerto No. 2 in B♭, K. 39 (1767)
  - Piano Concerto No. 3 in D, K. 40 (1767)
  - Piano Concerto No. 4 in G, K. 41 (1767)
  - Three Piano Concertos in D, in G and in E♭, K. 107 (1771 or 1765)
  - Piano Concerto No. 5 in D, K. 175 (1773)
  - Piano Concerto No. 6 in B♭, K. 238 (1776)
  - Concerto for 3 Pianos No. 7 in F major, K.242 (1776), the Lodron
  - Piano Concerto No. 8 in C, K. 246 (1776), the Lützow
  - Piano Concerto No. 9 in E♭, K. 271 (1777), the Jeunehomme
  - Concerto for Two Pianos in E♭, K. 365 (1779)
  - Piano Concerto No. 11 in F, K. 413 (1783)
  - Piano Concerto No. 12 in A, K. 414 (1782)
  - Piano Concerto No. 13 in C, K. 415 (1783)
  - Piano Concerto No. 14 in E♭, K. 449 (1784)
  - Piano Concerto No. 15 in B♭, K. 450 (1784)
  - Piano Concerto No. 16 in D, K. 451 (1784)
  - Piano Concerto No. 17 in G, K. 453 (1784)
  - Piano Concerto No. 18 in B♭, K. 456 (1784)
  - Piano Concerto No. 19 in F, K. 459 (1784)
  - Piano Concerto No. 20 in D minor, K. 466 (1785)
  - Piano Concerto No. 21 in C, K. 467 (1785)
  - Piano Concerto No. 22 in E♭, K. 482 (1785)
  - Piano Concerto No. 23 in A, K. 488 (1786)
  - Piano Concerto No. 24 in C minor, K. 491 (1786)
  - Piano Concerto No. 25 in C, K. 503 (1786)
  - Piano Concerto No. 26 in D, K. 537 (1788), the Coronation
  - Piano Concerto No. 27 in B♭, K. 595 (1791)
  - Concert Rondo No. 1 in D, K. 382 (1782)
  - Concert Rondo No. 2 in A, K. 386 (1782)
  - Concerto for Violin, Piano, and Orchestra K. 315f (fragment, 1778)
- Franz Xaver Wolfgang Mozart
  - Piano Concerto No. 1 in C, Op. 14 (1808-11)
  - Piano Concerto No. 2 in E♭ major, Op. 25 (1818)
- Dominic Muldowney
  - Piano Concerto (1982)

=== N ===
- Eduard Nápravník
  - Concerto symphonique in A minor Op 27 (1877)
  - Fantaisie russe in B minor Op 39 (1881)
- Per Nørgård
  - Concerto in due tempi, for piano & orchestra (1994)
- Vítězslav Novák
  - Piano Concerto in E Minor (1895)
- Michael Nyman
  - The Piano Concerto

=== O ===
- Hisato Ohzawa
  - Piano Concerto No. 3 'Kamikaze' (1938)
- Franco Oppo
  - Piano Concerto n.1 (1995)
- Leo Ornstein
  - Piano Concerto (1925)

=== P ===
- Pavel Pabst
  - Piano Concerto in E♭ major, Op. 82 (1882)
- Ignacy Jan Paderewski
  - Piano Concerto in A minor, Op. 17 (1888)
  - Fantaisie Polonaise, Op. 19 (1893)
- Carter Pann
  - Piano Concerto (1996–97)
- Giovanni Paisiello
  - Concerto for Piano and Orchestra, No. 1 in C major
  - Concerto for Piano and Orchestra, No. 2 in F major
  - Concerto for Piano and Orchestra, No. 3 in A major
  - Concerto for Piano and Orchestra, No. 4 in G minor
  - Concerto for Piano and Orchestra, No. 5 in D major
  - Concerto for Piano and Orchestra, No. 6 in B♭ major
  - Concerto for Piano and Orchestra, No. 7 in A major
  - Concerto for Piano and Orchestra, No. 8 in C major
- Selim Palmgren
  - Piano Concerto No. 1 in G minor, Op. 13 (1903)
  - Piano Concerto No. 2, Op. 33 'The River' (1913)
  - Piano Concerto No. 3 in F major, Op. 41 'Metamorphoses' (1915)
  - Piano Concerto No. 4, Op. 85 'April' (1926)
  - Piano Concerto No. 5 in A major, Op. 99 (1941)
- Andrzej Panufnik
  - Piano Concerto (1964, recomposed 1972)
- Hubert Parry
  - Piano Concerto in F♯ major (1878–79)
- Arvo Pärt
  - Credo for Piano, Mixed Chorus, and Orchestra (1968)
  - Lamentate for piano and orchestra (2002)
- Dora Pejačević
  - Piano Concerto in G minor Op. 33 (1913)
  - Phantasie Concertante in D minor for Piano and Orchestra, op. 48 (1919)
- Krzysztof Penderecki
  - Piano Concerto (2002)
- Vincent Persichetti
  - Concertino, Op. 16 (1941)
  - Piano Concerto, Op. 90 (1962)
- Hans Pfitzner
  - Piano Concerto in E♭, Op. 31 (1922)
- Tobias Picker
  - Piano Concerto No. 1 (1980)
  - Keys to the City (Piano Concerto No. 2) (1983)
  - Piano Concerto No. 3: Kilauea (1986)
  - Bang! for amplified piano and orchestra (1992)
- Gabriel Pierné
  - Piano Concerto in C minor, Op. 12 (1886)
  - Fantaisie-Ballet in B♭, Op. 6 (1885)
  - Scherzo-Caprice in D, Op. 25 (1890)
  - Poème Symphonique in D minor, Op. 37 (1903)
- Walter Piston
  - Concertino (1937)
  - Concerto for Two Pianos and Orchestra (1964)
- Ildebrando Pizzetti
  - Canti Della Stagione Alta (Concerto) (1930)
- Manuel Ponce
  - Piano Concerto (1912)
- Francis Poulenc
  - Concerto for Two Pianos and Orchestra (1932)
  - Piano Concerto (1949)
  - Aubade (1929) choreographic Concerto for piano and eighteen instruments
  - Concert champêtre (1927–28) for harpsichord and orchestra (also in version for piano and orchestra)
- Gerhard Präsent
  - Configurations - Piano Concerto (1981/82) ()
- André Previn
  - Piano Concerto (1986)
- Sergei Prokofiev
  - Piano Concerto No. 1 in D♭ major, Op. 10 (1912)
  - Piano Concerto No. 2 in G minor, Op. 16 (1913, rewritten 1923)
  - Piano Concerto No. 3 in C major, Op. 26 (1917–21), his best known
  - Piano Concerto No. 4 in B♭ major, Op. 53 (1931), for the left hand (written for Paul Wittgenstein)
  - Piano Concerto No. 5 in G major, Op. 55 (1932)
  - Piano Concerto No. 6 (1953, incomplete), for two pianos and strings

=== R ===
- Robin de Raaff
  - Piano Concerto No. 1 (2000–2002)
  - Piano Concerto No. 2 "Circulus" (2021–2022)
- Sergei Rachmaninoff
  - Piano Concerto No. 1 in F♯ minor, Op. 1 (1891)
  - Piano Concerto No. 2 in C minor, Op. 18 (1901)
  - Piano Concerto No. 3 in D minor, Op. 30 (1909)
  - Piano Concerto No. 4 in G minor, Op. 40 (1926)
  - Rhapsody on a Theme of Paganini, Op. 43 (1934)
  - Concerto Élégiaque, Op. 9b (an orchestration of Rachmaninoff's Trio élégiaque No. 2 by Alan Kogosowski)
  - Suite No. 1 (Fantasy), Op. 5 (orch. R. Harkness)
  - Suite No. 2, Op. 17, Op. 17 (orch. L. Holby)
- Joachim Raff
  - Piano Concerto in C minor, Op. 185 (1873)
  - Ode to Spring, Op. 76 (1857)
  - Suite in E♭, Op. 200
- Behzad Ranjbaran
  - Piano Concerto (2008)
- Einojuhani Rautavaara
  - Piano Concerto No. 1, Op. 45 (1969)
  - Piano Concerto No. 2 (1989)
  - Piano Concerto No. 3 'Gift of Dreams' (1998), written for pianist Vladimir Ashkenazy
- Maurice Ravel
  - Piano Concerto in G (1931)
  - Piano Concerto in D for the Left Hand (1931, written for Paul Wittgenstein)
- Alan Rawsthorne
  - Piano Concerto No. 1 (1943)
  - Piano Concerto No. 2 (1951)
  - Concerto for Two Pianos and Orchestra (1968)
- Max Reger
  - Piano Concerto in F minor, Op. 114 (1910)
- Carl Reinecke
  - Piano Concerto No. 1 in F♯ minor, Op. 72 (1860)
  - Piano Concerto No. 2 in E minor, Op. 120 (1872)
  - Piano Concerto No. 3 in C, Op. 144 (1877)
  - Piano Concerto No. 4 in B minor, Op. 254 (1901)
  - Konzertstück in G minor, Op. 33 (1848)
- Ottorino Respighi
  - Piano Concerto in A minor, P. 40 (1902)
  - Concerto in Modo Misolidio, P. 145 (1925)
  - Fantasia slava in G, P. 50 (1903)
  - Toccata, P. 156 (1928)
- Josef Rheinberger
  - Piano Concerto in A♭, Op. 94 (1876)
- Ferdinand Ries (Note: Ferdinand Ries numbered his 9 published concerti in order of publication rather than by instrumentation, his first published concerto was for Violin and Orchestra. There is no Piano Concerto No. 1)
  - Piano Concerto No. 2 in E♭ major, Op. 42 (1812)
  - Swedish National Airs and Variations, Op. 52 (1812)
  - Piano Concerto No. 3 in C♯ minor, Op. 55 (1812)
  - Piano Concerto No. 4 in C minor, Op. 115 (1809)
  - Grand Variations on " Rule Britannia", Op. 116 (1817)
  - Piano Concerto No. 5 in D major, Op. 120 "Concerto pastoral" (c. 1815–17; publ. 1823)
  - Piano Concerto No. 6 in C major, Op. 123 (1806; publ. c. 1824)
  - Piano Concerto No. 7 in a minor, Op. 132 "Abschieds-Concert von England" (1823)
  - Introduction et Rondeau brillant, Op. 144 (1825)
  - Piano Concerto No. 8 in A♭ major, Op. 151 "Gruss an den Rhein" (1826; publ. 1827)
  - Introduction et Variations Brillantes, Op. 170 (1817; publ. c. 1832)
  - Introduction and Polonaise, Op. 174 (1833)
  - Piano Concerto No. 9 in G minor, Op. 177 (c. 1833)
  - Introduction et Rondeau brilant, WoO54 (1835)
- Nikolai Rimsky-Korsakov
  - Piano Concerto in C♯ minor, Op. 30 (1882)
- Leroy Robertson
  - Piano Concerto (1966)
- Joaquín Rodrigo
  - Concierto heroico (1942)
- Julius Röntgen
  - Piano Concerto in G minor (1873)
  - Piano Concerto in D major, Op. 18 (1879)
  - Piano Concerto in D minor (1887)
  - Piano Concerto in F major (1906)
  - Piano Concerto in E major (1929)
  - Two Piano Concertos: No. 1 in E minor and No. 2 in C major (1929/30)
- Ned Rorem
  - Piano Concerto No. 2 (1950)
  - Concerto in Six Movements
  - Piano Concerto No. 4 for the Left Hand (1991)
- Nino Rota
  - Fantasy for piano and orchestra on twelve notes from "non si pasce di cibo mortale chi si pasce di cibo celeste" from the second act of W.A. Mozart's Don Giovanni
  - Concerto soiree for piano and orchestra
  - Concerto in E minor for piano and orchestra (piccolo mondo antico)
  - Concerto in C major for piano and orchestra
- Christopher Rouse
  - Seeing for piano and orchestra (1998)
- Albert Roussel
  - Concerto in C, Op. 36 (1927)
- Alec Rowley
  - Concerto for Piano, Strings and Percussion, Op. 49 (1938)
- Edmund Rubbra
  - Sinfonia Concertante, Op. 38 (1936, revised 1943)
  - Piano Concerto in G, Op. 85 (1956)
- Anton Rubinstein
  - Piano Concerto (1847), 1 movement only
  - Piano Concerto in C (1849), revised as Octet in D, Op. 9 (1856)
  - Piano Concerto No. 1 in E minor, Op. 25 (1850)
  - Piano Concerto No. 2 in F, Op. 35 (1851)
  - Piano Concerto No. 3 in G, Op. 45 (1853–4)
  - Piano Concerto No. 4 in D minor, Op. 70 (1864)
  - Piano Concerto No. 5 in E♭, Op. 94 (1874)
  - Piano Fantasia in C, Op. 84 (1869)
  - Konzertstück in A♭, Op. 113
  - Russian Capriccio, Op. 120 (1878)
  - Caprice russe, Op. 102
- Poul Ruders
  - Piano Concerto No. 1 (1994)
  - Piano Concerto No. 2 (2009)
- Frederic Rzewski
  - A Long Time Man (24 variations on the prison song "It Makes a Long Time Man Feel Bad") (1979)

=== S ===
- Shigeaki Saegusa
  - Piano Concerto (1971)
- P. Peter Sacco
  - Piano Concerto No. 1 (1964)
- Camille Saint-Saëns
  - Piano Concerto No. 1 in D, Op. 17 (1858)
  - Piano Concerto No. 2 in G minor, Op. 22 (1868)
  - Piano Concerto No. 3 in E♭, Op. 29 (1869)
  - Piano Concerto No. 4 in C minor, Op. 44 (1873)
  - Piano Concerto No. 5 in F, Op. 103 (1895), the Egyptian
  - 'Africa,' Fantaisie, Op. 89, for piano and orchestra
  - 'Wedding Cake,' Op. 76, caprice-valse for piano and orchestra
  - Allegro appassionato, Op. 70, for piano and orchestra
  - Rhapsodie d'Auvergne, Op. 73
  - Le carnaval des animaux (2 pianos; 1886)
- Antonio Salieri
  - Piano Concerto in C major (1773)
  - Piano Concerto in B♭ major (1773)
- Siegfried Salomon
  - Piano Concerto in A minor Op. 54 (1947)
- Esa-Pekka Salonen
  - Piano Concerto (2007)
- Emil von Sauer
  - Piano Concerto No. 1 in E minor
  - Piano Concerto No. 2 in C minor
- Ahmed Adnan Saygun
  - Piano Concerto No. 1, Op. 34
  - Piano Concerto No. 2, Op. 71
- Xaver Scharwenka
  - Piano Concerto No. 1 in B♭ minor, Op. 32 (1877)
  - Piano Concerto No. 2 in C minor, Op. 56 (1880)
  - Piano Concerto No. 3 in C♯ minor, Op. 80 (1898)
  - Piano Concerto No. 4 in F minor, Op. 82
- Ernest Schelling
  - Suite Fantastique, Op. 7
  - Impressions from an Artist's Life (1913)
- Franz Schmidt
  - Concertante Variations on a Theme of Beethoven (1923)
  - Piano Concerto No. 2 in E♭ for the Left Hand (1934)
- Alfred Schnittke
  - Piano Concerto (No. 1), for piano and orchestra (1960)
  - Piano Concerto (No. 2), for piano and chamber orchestra (1964)
  - Piano Concerto (No. 3), for piano and strings (1979)
  - Piano Concerto (No. 4), for one piano four hands and chamber orchestra (1988)
- Arnold Schoenberg
  - Piano Concerto, Op. 42 (1942)
- Ervin Schulhoff
  - Concerto for Piano and Small Orchestra
  - Piano Concerto Op. 11
- William Schuman
  - Piano Concerto (1930, rev. 1942)
- Clara Schumann
  - Piano Concerto in A minor, Op. 7 (1832–3)
- Robert Schumann
  - Piano Concerto in A minor, Op. 54 (1845)
  - Introduction and Allegro Appassionato, Op. 92
  - Introduction and Allegro, Op. 134
- Ludvig Schytte
  - Piano Concerto in C♯ minor Op. 28 (c. 1884)
- Cyril Scott
  - Piano Concerto
- Alexander Scriabin
  - Piano Concerto in F♯ minor, Op. 20 (1896)
  - Fantasia in A minor (1889)
  - Prometheus: The Poem of Fire, Op. 60 (1909–10)
- Peter Sculthorpe
  - Piano Concerto (1983)
- Peter Seabourne
  - Piano Concerto No. 1 (2003)
  - Piano Concerto No. 2 (2005)
- Roger Sessions
  - Piano Concerto (1956)
- Giovanni Sgambati
  - Piano Concerto in G minor, Op. 15 (1885)
- Dmitri Shostakovich
  - Piano Concerto No. 1 in C minor, Op. 35 (1933), also includes a part for solo trumpet
  - Piano Concerto No. 2 in F, Op. 102 (1957)
- Sheila Silver
  - Concerto for Piano and Orchestra (1996)
- Rudolph Simonsen
  - Piano Concerto in F minor (1915)
- Christian Sinding
  - Piano Concerto in D♭, Op. 6 (1887–89, revised 1901)
- Nikos Skalkottas
  - Piano Concerto No. 1 (1931)
  - Piano Concerto No. 2 (1937)
  - Piano Concerto No. 3 (1939)
  - Piano Concerto (1948–49)
- Roger Smalley
  - Concerto for Piano and Orchestra (1984–85)
- Juan María Solare
  - Piano Concerto No. 1 (2018–2021)
- Arthur Somervell
  - Piano Concerto in A minor (1921)
- Kaikhosru Shapurji Sorabji
  - Piano Concerto No. 1 (1915–16)
  - Piano Concerto No. 2 (1916–17; only two-piano version survives)
  - Piano Concerto No. 3 (1918)
  - Piano Concerto No. 4 (1918)
  - Piano Concerto No. 5 (1920)
  - Piano Concerto No. 6 (1922)
  - Piano Concerto No. 7, Simorg-Anka (1924)
  - Piano Concerto No. 8 (1927–28)
  - Symphonic Variations for Piano and Orchestra (1935–37, 1953–56)
  - Opus clavisymphonicum—Concerto for Piano and Large Orchestra (1957–59)
  - Opusculum clavisymphonicum vel claviorchestrale (1973–75)
- Leo Smit
  - Piano Concerto (1937)
- Charles Villiers Stanford
  - Piano Concerto in B♭ major, Op. posth (1873)
  - Piano Concerto No. 1 in G, Op. 59
  - Piano Concerto No. 2 in C minor, Op. 126
  - Piano Concerto No. 3 in E♭, Op. 171 (1919)
  - Concert Variations on "Down among the Dead Men", Op. 71 (1898)
- Bernhard Stavenhagen
  - Piano Concerto in B minor, Op. 4 (1894)
- Wilhelm Stenhammar
  - Piano Concerto No. 1 in B♭ minor, Op. 1 (1893)
  - Piano Concerto No. 2 in D minor, Op. 23 (1905–07)
- Zygmunt Stojowski
  - Piano Concerto No. 1 in F♯ minor, Op. 3 (1890)
  - Piano Concerto No. 2 in A♭, Op. 32 (1909–10)
  - Rhapsodie symphonique, Op. 23 (1904)
- Oscar Strasnoy
  - "Kuleshov", for solo piano and chamber orchestra (2017)
- Richard Strauss
  - Burleske in D minor (1885–86)
  - Parergon zur Sinfonia Domestica, Op. 73 (piano left-hand; 1924–25)
  - Panathenaenzug, Op. 74 (piano left-hand; 1926–27)
- Igor Stravinsky
  - Concerto for Piano and Wind Instruments (1923-24/51)
  - Capriccio for Piano and Orchestra (1928–9)
  - Five Movements for Piano and Orchestra (1958–9)
- Stjepan Šulek
  - Piano Concerto No. 1 (1949)
  - Piano Concerto No. 2 (1952)
  - Piano Concerto No. 3 (1970)
- Tomáš Svoboda
  - Concerto No. 1 for Piano and Orchestra, Op. 71 (1974)
  - Concerto No. 2 for Piano and Orchestra, Op. 134 (1989)
- Karol Szymanowski
  - Symphony No. 4, Symphonie Concertante

=== T ===
- Emil Tabakov
  - Concerto for Piano and Orchestra
- Tōru Takemitsu
  - Arc (1963)
  - Asterism (1968)
  - Quatrain for violin, clarinet, cello, piano soloists and orchestra (1975)
  - Riverrun (1984)
- Otar Taktakishvili
  - Four piano Concertos
- Josef Tal
  - Concerto No. 1 for piano & orchestra (1945)
  - Concerto No. 2 for piano & orchestra (1953)
  - Concerto No. 3 for tenor, piano and chamber orchestra (1956)
  - Double Concerto for two pianos & orchestra (1979)
- Tan Dun
  - Piano Concerto "The Fire"
- Sergei Taneyev
  - Piano Concerto in E♭ (1876; reconstruction)
- Alexander Tansman
  - Suite for Two Pianos and Orchestra (1928)
- John Tavener
  - Palintropos (1978)
- Boris Tchaikovsky
  - Piano Concerto in C minor, 1971
- Pyotr Ilyich Tchaikovsky
  - Piano Concerto No. 1 in B♭ minor, Op. 23 (1874)
  - Piano Concerto No. 2 in G, Op. 44 (1880)
  - Piano Concerto No. 3 in E♭, Op. 75 (1893)
  - Concert Fantasia in G, Op. 56 (1883)
  - Andante and Finale in B♭, Op. 79 (1893)
- Alexander Tcherepnin
  - Piano Concerto No. 1, Op. 12
  - Piano Concerto No. 2, Op. 26
  - Piano Concerto No. 3, Op. 48
  - Piano Concerto No. 4 (Fantaisie), Op. 78
  - Piano Concerto No. 5, Op. 96
  - Piano Concerto No. 6, Op. 99
- Nikolai Tcherepnin
  - Piano Concerto in C♯ minor, Op. 30 (1905)
- Sigismond Thalberg
  - Piano Concerto in F minor, Op. 5
- Ferdinand Thieriot (1838–1919)
  - Piano Concerto No. 1 in B♭ (1885)
  - Piano Concerto No. 2 in C minor (1904)
- Ludwig Thuille
  - Piano Concerto in D major (1882)
- Michael Tippett
  - Piano Concerto (1955)
  - Fantasy on a Theme by Handel (1942)
- Loris Tjeknavorian
  - Piano Concerto, Op. 4 (1960-61 rev 1974)
- Zlata Tkach
  - Concerto for Piano and Orchestra (2002) 'In memory of victims of Kishinev Pogrom 1903'
- Václav Tomášek
  - Piano Concerto in C major
  - Piano Concerto in E♭ major
  - Piano Concerto (1994)
- Donald Tovey
  - Piano Concerto in A, Op. 15 (1903)
- Joan Tower
  - Concerto for Piano (Homage to Beethoven) (1985)
  - Rapids (Piano Concerto No. 2) (1996)
- Daniil Trifonov
  - Piano Concerto in E♭ minor (2014)
- Joaquín Turina
  - Rapsodia Sinfónica (1931)
- Geirr Tveitt
  - Piano Concerto No. 1 in F major, Op. 1 (1927)
  - Piano Concerto No. 2 (lost; MS destroyed in a house fire)
  - Piano Concerto No. 3 'Hommage a Brahms', Op. 126 (lost; MS destroyed in house fire, but being reconstructed from recording)
  - Piano Concerto No. 4 'Aurora Borealis', Op. 130 (lost, but reconstructed from surviving orchestral parts, two piano reduction, and recording; 1947)
  - Piano Concerto No. 5, Op. 156 (1954)
  - Piano Concerto No. 6 (lost; MS destroyed in a house fire)
  - Variations on a Folksong from Hardanger for two pianos and orchestra (1949)

=== U ===
- Viktor Ullmann
  - Klavierkonzert, Op. 25 (1939)
- Unsuk Chin
  - Piano Concerto (1997)
- Galina Ustvolskaya
  - Concerto for Piano, String Orchestra and Timpani

=== V ===
- Ralph Vaughan Williams
  - Piano Concerto (1933 – also exists in a version for two pianos and orchestra of 1946)
  - Fantasia (Quasi Variazione) on the "Old 104th" Psalm Tune (1949)
- José Vianna da Motta
  - Piano Concerto in A (1886–87)
  - Fantasia Dramática
- Louis Vierne
  - Poème, Op. 50 (1926?)
- Heitor Villa-Lobos
  - Piano Concerto No. 1 (1945)
  - Piano Concerto No. 2 (1948)
  - Piano Concerto No. 3 (1952–57)
  - Piano Concerto No. 4 (1952)
  - Piano Concerto No. 5 (1954)
  - Suite for piano and orchestra
  - Momoprecoce, fantasy for piano and orchestra (1929)
  - Chôros No. 8, for two pianos and orchestra (1925)
  - Chôros No. 11, for piano and orchestra (1928)
  - Bachianas Brasileiras No. 3
- Carl Vine
  - Piano Concerto No. 1 (1997)
  - Piano Concerto No. 2 (2012)

=== W ===
- William Walton
  - Sinfonia Concertante (1928, revised 1944)
- Carl Maria von Weber
  - Piano Concerto No. 1 in C, J. 98 (1810)
  - Piano Concerto No. 2 in E♭, J. 155 (1815)
  - Konzertstück in F minor, Op. 79, J. 282 (1821)
- Douglas Weiland
  - Piano Concerto, Op. 31
- Judith Weir
  - Piano Concerto (1997)
- Mark Wessel
  - Piano Concerto (1941)
  - Poem, for orchestra and piano solo (1924)
  - Scherzo burlesque, for piano and orchestra (c. 1931)
  - Symphony Concertante, for piano and horn with orchestra (1929)
- Charles-Marie Widor
  - Piano Concerto No. 1 in F minor, Op. 39 (1880)
  - Piano Concerto No. 2 in C, Op. 77 (1905)
  - Fantaisie in A♭, Op. 62 (1892)
- Jozef Wieniawski
  - Piano Concerto in G minor Op 20 (1859)
- Adolf Wiklund
  - Piano Concerto No. 1 in E minor, Op. 10
  - Piano Concerto No. 2 in B minor, Op. 17
- John Williams
  - Scherzo for Piano and Orchestra (2014)
  - Piano Concerto (2025)
- Malcolm Williamson
  - Piano Concerto No. 1 (1956–58)
  - Piano Concerto No. 2 (1960)
  - Piano Concerto No. 3 (1962)
  - Concerto for Two Pianos and String Orchestra (1972–73)
  - Piano Concerto No. 4 (1991–94)
  - Sinfonia Concertante (1958–60), for piano, 3 trumpets and string orchestra
- Thomas Wilson
  - Piano Concerto
- Haydn Wood
  - Piano Concerto in D minor (1909)
- Charles Wuorinen
  - Piano Concerto (1966)
  - Second Concerto: for Amplified Piano and Orchestra (1974)
  - Third Piano Concerto (1983)
  - Fourth Piano Concerto (2003)
  - Flying to Kahani (2005)
  - Time Regained, concert piece for piano and orchestra based on early music, Machaut, Matteo di Perugia, Dufay and Gibbons (2008)

=== X ===
- Iannis Xenakis
  - Synaphaï (Connexities), for piano and orchestra (1969)
  - Erikhthon, for piano and orchestra (1974)
  - Keqrops, for piano and orchestra (1986)

=== Y ===
- Richard Yardumian
  - Passacaglia, Recitative and Fugue, a Concerto for piano and orchestra (premiered 1958, Rudolf Firkušný, Philadelphia Orchestra, conducted by Eugene Ormandy.)
- Akio Yashiro
  - Piano Concerto
- Yin Chengzong et al.
  - Yellow River Piano Concerto (arrangement of themes from Xian Xinghai's Yellow River Cantata)
- Takashi Yoshimatsu
  - Threnody to Toki for piano and string orchestra, Op. 12 (1980)
  - "Memo Flora" for Piano and Orchestra, Op. 67 (1997)
  - When an angel fals into a doze... for piano and string orchestra, Op. 73 (1998)
  - "Cepheus Note" for Piano Left Hand and Chamber Orchestra, Op. 102 (2007)
- Benjamin Yusupov
  - Concerto-Intimo for piano and orchestra (2005)
  - Con Moto for piano and string orchestra (2007)

=== Z ===
- Aaron Zigman
  - Tango Manos (2019)
- Efrem Zimbalist
  - Piano Concerto in E♭ (composed 1953 for William Kapell, destroyed in the air crash in which the pianist died, reconstructed by the composer)
- Ellen Taaffe Zwilich
  - Piano Concerto (1986)
  - Millennium Fantasy (2000)

== Works for orchestra or large ensemble with less important or modest piano part ==
- John Adams
  - Common Tones in Simple Time (1979)
  - Harmonielehre (1985)
  - The Chairman Dances (1985)
  - Tromba Lontana (1986)
  - Nixon in China (1987)
  - Fearful Symmetries (1988)
  - Lollapalooza (1995)
  - Slonimsky's Earbox (1996)
  - Naive and Sentimental Music (1998)
  - Guide to Strange Places (2001)
  - My Father Knew Charles Ives (2003)
  - The Dharma at Big Sur, for electric violin and orchestra (2003)
  - City Noir (2009)
  - Absolute Jest, for string quartet and orchestra (2012)
  - The Gospel According to the Other Mary (2013)
  - Saxophone Concerto (2013)
  - Girls of the Golden West (2017)
- Samuel Barber
  - Violin Concerto (1939)
- Béla Bartók
  - Dance Suite (1923)
  - The Miraculous Mandarin (1924)
  - Music for String, Percussion, and Celesta (1936)
- Leonard Bernstein
  - Symphony No. 1 "Jeremiah" (1942)
  - Three Dance Episodes from On the Town (1945)
  - Symphonic Suite from On the Waterfront (1954)
  - Symphonic Dances from West Side Story (1960)
  - Slava! A Political Overture (1977)
- Ernest Bloch
  - Concerto Grosso No. 1 (1925)
- Aaron Copland
  - Symphony for Organ and Orchestra (1924)
  - El Salón México (1936)
  - The Second Hurricane (1937)
  - Billy the Kid (1938)
  - Four Dance Episodes from Rodeo (1942)
  - Appalachian Spring (1944)
  - Letter from Home (1944)
  - Symphony No. 3 (1946)
  - The Tender Land (1954)
  - Connotations (1962)
  - Inscape (1964)
- Morton Feldman
  - Viola in My Life IV for viola and orchestra
- George Gershwin
  - Blue Monday (1922)
  - Porgy and Bess (1935)
  - Catfish Row (Suite from Porgy and Bess) (1936)
- Philip Glass
  - Symphony No. 1 Low (1993)
  - Symphony No. 4 Heroes (1996)
  - Symphony No. 7 Toltec for orchestra and chorus (2005)
  - Symphony No. 8 (2005)
  - Symphony No. 9 (2011)
  - Symphony No. 10 (2012)
  - Symphony No. 11 (2017)
  - Symphony No. 12 Lodger (2019)
- Percy Grainger
  - Hill Song No. 1 (1902)
  - In a Nutshell (suite) (1916)
  - Children's March: Over the Hills and Far Away (1919)
- Charles Ives
  - A Set of Pieces for Theatre Orchestra (1915)
  - Symphony No. 4 (1916)
  - Three Places in New England (1912–16)
- Aram Khachaturian
  - Gayane (1939–41)
  - Symphony No. 2 (1944)
  - Spartacus (1950–54)
- William Kraft
  - Concerto for Timpani and Orchestra (1984)
- Frederik Magle
  - Cantabile – symphonic suite (2004–09)
- Gustav Mahler
  - “Um Mitternacht,” from Rückert-Lieder (1905)
  - Symphony No. 8 in E♭ major, "Symphony of a Thousand" (1906–07)
- Arturo Márquez
  - Danzón No. 1 (1994)
  - Danzón No. 2 (1994)
  - Danzón No. 4 (1996)
  - Danzón No. 9 (2017)
- Frank Martin
  - Ballade pour saxophone and orchestre (1938/39)
- Bohuslav Martinů
  - Symphony No. 1 (1942)
  - Symphony No. 2 (1943)
  - Symphony No. 3 (1944)
  - Symphony No. 4 (1945)
  - Symphony No. 5 (1946)
  - Symphony No. 6 Fantaisies symphoniques (1953)
  - Concerto for Oboe and Small Orchestra (1955)
- Modest Mussorgsky
  - Boris Godunov (1874)
- Carl Orff
  - Carmina Burana (1935–36), Piano I and II
- Sergei Prokofiev
  - Scythian Suite (1914–15)
  - Chout (1915–21)
  - Symphony No. 2 (1924–25)
  - Symphony No. 4 (1929–30)
  - Lieutenant Kijé (1934)
  - Overture on Hebrew Themes (arr. orch 1934)
  - The Queen of Spades (1936)
  - Russian Overture (1936)
  - Cantata for the 20th Anniversary of the October Revolution (1936–37)
  - Alexander Nevsky (1938)
  - Romeo and Juliet (1938)
  - Cinderella (1940–44)
  - Ivan the Terrible (1942–45)
  - Symphony No. 5 (1944)
  - Flourish, Mighty Land (1947)
  - Symphony No. 6 (1947)
  - The Tale of the Stone Flower (1948–53)
  - Symphony No. 7 (1952)
- Sergei Rachmaninoff
  - Symphonic Dances (1940)
- Ottorino Respighi
  - Fountains of Rome (1916)
  - Pines of Rome (1924)
  - Roman Festivals (1928)
- Camille Saint-Saëns
  - Symphony No. 3 (1886)
- Dmitri Shostakovich
  - Symphony No. 1 (1924–25)
  - Symphony No. 5 (1937)
  - Symphony No. 7 (1941)
  - Symphony No. 13 (1962)
- Karlheinz Stockhausen
  - Gruppen for three orchestras (1955–57)
  - Inori (1973–74)
- Igor Stravinsky
  - The Firebird (1910)
  - Petrushka (1911)
  - Les Noces (1914–17)
  - Oedipus rex (1927)
  - Symphony of Psalms (scored for two pianos) (1930)
  - Symphony in Three Movements (1942–45)
  - Scherzo à la russe (1944)
  - Ebony Concerto (1945)
  - Agon (1957)
  - Threni (1958)
  - The Flood (1963)
  - Variations: Aldous Huxley in memoriam (1964)
  - Requiem Canticles (1966)

== See also ==
- List of compositions for keyboard and orchestra
- List of harpsichord concertos
- List of Triple Concertos for Violin, Cello, Piano and Orchestra
- List of works for piano left-hand and orchestra
