= Piano Concerto No. 6 =

Piano Concerto No. 6 refers to the sixth piano concerto written by one of a number of composers:

- Piano Concerto No. 6 (Beethoven) in D major, an arrangement of the Violin Concerto, Op. 61, for solo piano and orchestra (Op. 61a)
  - Piano Concerto No. 6 (Beethoven) in D major, Hess 15 (incomplete)
- Piano Concerto No. 6 (Field) in C major
- Piano Concerto No. 6 (Mozart) in B-flat major
- Piano Concerto No. 6 (Prokofiev) (unfinished)
- Piano Concerto No. 6 (Ries) in C major

== See also ==
- List of compositions for piano and orchestra
