= Piano Concerto No. 3 =

Piano Concerto No. 3 refers to the third piano concerto written by one of a number of composers:

- Piano Concerto No. 3 (Balada), by Leonardo Balada, 1899
- Piano Concerto No. 3 (Bartók) in E major (Sz. 119, BB 127) by Béla Bartók, 1945
- Piano Concerto No. 3 (Beethoven) in C minor (Op. 37), c.1800
- Piano Concerto No. 3 (Chopin) (Allegro de concert), 1841
- Piano Concerto No. 3 (Hummel) in B minor (Op. 89), 1819
- Piano Concerto No. 3 (Kabalevsky) in D major (Op. 50, Youth) by Dmitri Kabalevsky, 1952
- Piano Concerto No. 3 (Lieberson), by Peter Lieberson, 2003
- Piano Concerto No. 3 (Liszt) in E♭ major (Op. posth., S.125a), c.1839
- Piano Concerto No. 3 (MacMillan), (The Mysteries of Light) by James MacMillan, 2008
- Piano Concerto No. 3 (Medtner) in E minor (Op. 60, Ballade), by Nikolai Medtner, 1943
- Piano Concerto No. 3 (Mozart) in D major (K.40), by Wolfgang Amadeus Mozart, c.1772
- Piano Concerto No. 3 (Ohzawa) in A♭ major (Kamikaze) by Hisato Ohzawa, 1938
- Piano Concerto No. 3 (Prokofiev) in C major (Op. 26) by Sergei Prokofiev, 1913–21
- Piano Concerto No. 3 (Rachmaninoff) in D minor (Op. 30) by Sergei Rachmaninoff, 1909
- Piano Concerto No. 3 (Rautavaara) (Gift of Dreams) by Einojuhani Rautavaara, 1998
- Piano Concerto No. 3 (Ries) in C♯ minor (Op. 55) by Ferdinand Ries, c.1813
- Piano Concerto No. 3 (Saint-Saëns) in E♭ major (Op. 29) by Camille Saint-Saëns, 1869
- Piano Concerto No. 3 (Tchaikovsky) in E♭ major (Op. posth. 75) by Pyotr Ilyich Tchaikovsky, 1893–94
- Piano Concerto No. 3 (Villa-Lobos)
- Piano Concerto No. 3 (Williamson) in E♭ major by Malcolm Williamson, 1962

== See also ==
- List of compositions for piano and orchestra
