= Piano Concerto No. 8 =

Piano Concerto No. 8 refers to the eighth piano concerto written by one of a number of composers:

- Piano Concerto No. 8 (Mozart) in C major, K. 246
- Piano Concerto No. 8 (Ries) in A-flat major, Gruss an den Rhein

== See also ==
- List of compositions for piano and orchestra
