= Viola Concerto (Lieberson) =

Viola concerto by Peter Lieberson

The Viola Concerto is a composition for solo viola and orchestra by the American composer Peter Lieberson. The music was commissioned by the Toronto Symphony Orchestra and the Symphony Nova Scotia for Steven Dann, the principal violist of the Toronto Symphony. It was completed in 1992, though Lieberson later revised the work in 2003. The work is dedicated to Steven Dann.

== Composition ==
=== Structure ===
The viola concerto has a duration of roughly 18 minutes and is composed in three movements:

1. Rhapsody
2. Scherzo
3. Adagio – Allegro

=== Instrumentation ===
The work is scored for solo viola and an orchestra consisting of two flutes (doubling piccolo), oboe, cor anglais, two clarinets, two bassoons, two horns, two trumpets, two trombones, tuba, timpani, and strings.

== Reception ==
Reviewing a 2014 recording of the work, Andrew Clements of The Guardian described the viola concerto as a "relaxed, almost neoromantic" piece and called it "beautifully crafted and elegantly refined." Musical America also praised the piece, writing, "The Viola Concerto is an excellent example of a composer restricting himself to a particular palette, yet allowing a plethora of permutations from it to emerge." "This is one of my favorite recordings of 2014."

== Recording ==
A recording of the Viola Concerto, featuring a performance by the violist Roberto Díaz and the Odense Symphony Orchestra under the direction of Scott Yoo, was released on the album "The Music of Peter Lieberson, Vol. 3" through Bridge Records on June 3, 2014. The album also features a recording of Lieberson's Piano Concerto No. 3.
