= Neruda Songs =

Orchestral song cycle by Pieter Lieberson

- by Peter Lieberson
- Form: song cycle
- Commissioned by: Los Angeles Philharmonic and the Boston Symphony
- Text: Pablo Neruda
- Performed: 20 May 2005: Walt Disney Concert Hall
- Published: 2005: Associated Music Publishers

The Neruda Songs are a cycle of five songs composed for mezzo-soprano soloist and orchestra by the American composer Peter Lieberson (1946–2011) for his wife, singer Lorraine Hunt Lieberson (1954–2006). The cycle is a setting of poems by twentieth-century Chilean poet and diplomat Pablo Neruda.

The Neruda Songs were co-commissioned by the Los Angeles Philharmonic and the Boston Symphony; the world premiere was given on May 20, 2005, by the Los Angeles Philharmonic with Esa-Pekka Salonen conducting and Hunt Lieberson as soloist. The Boston Symphony performed the work in November 2005 with Hunt Lieberson as soloist and James Levine conducting, followed by performances with the Cleveland Orchestra, Robert Spano conducting. Hunt Lieberson died of breast cancer in July 2006, aged 52. Nonesuch subsequently released a commercial recording of the Boston/Levine performance of the Neruda Songs.

In December 2007, Lieberson won the 2008 Grawemeyer Award for Music Composition for Neruda Songs. The Rilke Songs have also been issued, in separate studio and concert performances by Hunt Lieberson, both on the Bridge Records, Inc. label.

== Songs ==
1. Si no fuera porque tus ojos tienen color de luna (trans. "If your eyes were not the color of the moon")
2. Amor, amor, las nubes a la torre del cielo (trans. "Love, love, the clouds went up the tower of the sky")
3. No estés lejos de mí un solo día, porque cómo (trans. "Don't go far off, not even for a day")
4. Ya eres mía. Reposa con tu sueño en mi sueño (trans. "And now you're mine. Rest with your dream in my dream")
5. Amor mío, si muero y tú no mueres (trans. "My love, if I die and you don't")
