= Piano Concerto in C major =

Piano Concerto in C major may refer to:

- Piano Concerto No. 8 (Mozart)
- Piano Concerto No. 13 (Mozart)
- Piano Concerto No. 21 (Mozart)
- Piano Concerto No. 25 (Mozart)
- Piano Concerto No. 1 (Beethoven)
- Piano Concerto No. 6 (Ries)
- Piano Concerto No. 3 (Prokofiev)
- Piano Concerto (Vaughan Williams)
