= Red Garuda =

Piano concerto by Pieter Lieberson

Red Garuda for Piano and Orchestra is the second piano concerto by the American composer Peter Lieberson. The work was commissioned by the Boston Symphony Orchestra and was composed between 1998 and 1999. Like Lieberson's first Piano Concerto, it was written for the pianist Peter Serkin, who first performed the work with the Boston Symphony Orchestra under the direction of Seiji Ozawa on October 14, 1999. The piece is dedicated to Peter Serkin and Seiji Ozawa.

== Composition ==
Red Garuda is composed in one continuous movement has a duration of approximately 24 minutes.

=== Background ===
Lieberson described his inspiration for the piece in the score program notes, writing, "The idea behind my second piano concerto was inspired by the Eastern mythological creature called the Red Garuda. The Red Garuda is a large bird that travels continuously — it never stops flying, and never needs to measure its flight or its distance. In mythology the Garuda represents the personal principle of not having to restrict how far one can travel or go in life’s journey. It symbolizes an absolute freedom, if you will, and its flight is not dependent on conventional limitations." He continued, "In writing the work, I envisioned a huge bird flying over different types of landscapes. The opening of the piece presents a feeling of the bird's appearance and its flight. This introduction is followed by a number of variations. These are based not only on the musical content of the opening, but are also based on different landscapes, with each one characterized by the traditional elements of fire, water, and earth (combined with wind)."

=== Instrumentation ===
The work is scored for solo piano and a large orchestra consisting of piccolo, two flutes, two oboes, English horn, two clarinets, E-flat clarinet, bass clarinet (doubling contrabass clarinet), two bassoons, contrabassoon, four horns, three trumpets, two trombones, bass trombone, tuba, timpani, five percussionists, celesta, harp, and strings.

== Reception ==
Red Garuda has been praised by music critics. Paul Griffiths of The New York Times opined that it is "decidedly not a concerto but rather a symphonic poem with a prominent piano part" and wrote, "Future performances will show whether the piece is perhaps too illustrative: too much of a picture book and not enough of a story. It is, for sure, beautifully scored, not least when flashy passages spill out at once from the piano and the percussion or the high woodwinds. It speaks of excitement -- perhaps of the composer's excitement in returning to the scene of his early triumph and in finding a new sense of direction. It sounds as if it will, like the Piano Concerto, be the start of something." The work was also praised by Mark Swed of the Los Angeles Times, who wrote, "The orchestral writing is colorful and of exceptional beauty. The concerto is in sections meant to depict fire, water, earth and wind; and the elements are captured through delicate woodwind flickers, string washes and an ever-changing heartbeat pulse that ranges from a delicate fluttering to a delicious, deliberate plotz of brass and percussion. Though ever serious, spiritual and modernist, Lieberson is also a closet eclectic. And it is a unique quality of his music that traces of Broadway dance music in the last section of earth and wind can contribute to the work's ineffable feeling of mysticism and satisfaction." Andrew Clements of The Guardian similarly lauded the "resourceful solo writing" and remarked, "It's cast as a 25-minute set of loose-knit variations, rapt stillness and teeming energy."
