= Rilke Songs =

Song cycle by Peter Lieberson

Rilke Songs is a composition for mezzo-soprano and piano by the American composer Peter Lieberson. The work is set to poetry by the Bohemian-Austrian writer Rainer Maria Rilke. It was composed for Lieberson's wife Lorraine Hunt Lieberson, who gave the world premiere in Santa Fe, New Mexico on July 18, 2001. The piece was a finalist for the 2002 Pulitzer Prize for Music.

== Composition ==
=== Background ===
Peter Lieberson was first exposed to the writing of Rainer Maria Rilke as child, recalling in the score program notes, "When I was growing up, my mother, whose first language was German, would often quote lines from Rilke. I have been drawn to his poetry ever since." Lieberson composed the songs specifically for his wife Lorraine Hunt Lieberson, remarking of Rilke's poetry:

I think of them as love songs even though the poems themselves are not overtly about love. They are about being childlike and open in 'O ihr Zärtlichen'; in 'Atmen, du unsichtbares Gedicht!,' about the breath being a complete exchange between our own essence and the universe, how the breath seems to go out into space like our wandering son; the mysterious way in which we might transform ourselves: "If drinking is bitter, turn yourself into wine (from 'Stiller Freund'). To me these Rilkean insights are a gift of love.

=== Structure ===
Rilke Songs has a duration of roughly 18 minutes and is composed in five movements:

1. O ihr Zärtlichen
2. Atmen, du unsichtbares Gedicht!
3. Wolle die Wandlung
4. Blumenmuskel, der der Anemone
5. Stiller Freund

== Reception ==
Hunt Lieberson's live recording of The Rilke Songs at the 2004 Ravinia Festival with Peter Serkin on piano was released on Bridge Records. James H. North, in his review for Fanfare magazine, wrote ""Lieberson’s straightforward music seems to equate simplicity with truth. Music and performance transport us into Rilke’s world and involve us in his musings; that the vocal line is lyrical and the voice beautiful is almost incidental." Robert Carl, in the same issue, stated "Composer Lieberson seizes the musical language of the period in which Rilke’s Sonnets were written, and makes his own version of Mahler, Strauss, Wolf, and Berg. Overall, the result is wonderful. At their best, these songs project an open, naturally breathing harmonic sense that seems rooted in traditional tonality, yet is not readily identifiable as that of any specific precedent."

Hunt Lieberson and Serkin recorded a studio version in 2005. Vivien Schweitzer reviewed this performance for The New York Times writing, "[Lieberson's] Rilke Songs, written for his wife, are intensely communicative works, combining atonality and tonality in the vivid piano part." She added, "Mr. Lieberson writes that he thinks of these pieces as 'love songs,' even though the poems are not specifically about love. Ms. Hunt Lieberson's radiant voice is expressive throughout her range, with its bright top notes, smoky lower register and elegant vibrato."
