= Piano Concerto No. 1 (Lieberson) =

Piano concerto by Peter Lieberson

The Piano Concerto No. 1 is a composition for solo piano and orchestra by the American composer Peter Lieberson. The work was commissioned by the Boston Symphony Orchestra for its centennial. Lieberson started composing the piece in 1980 and completed it on March 2, 1983. It was written for the pianist Peter Serkin, who first performed the concerto with the Boston Symphony Orchestra under the direction of Seiji Ozawa on April 21, 1983. The piece is dedicated to Peter Serkin and Seiji Ozawa. It was a finalist for the 1984 Pulitzer Prize for Music.

== Composition ==
The piano concerto has a duration of roughly 45 minutes and is composed in three numbered movements. The composition blends traditional and western musical techniques with Buddhist themes.

=== Instrumentation ===
The work is scored for a solo piano and a large orchestra consisting of three flutes (2nd and 3rd doubling piccolo), two oboes, English horn, two clarinets, bass clarinet (doubling contrabass clarinet), two bassoons, contrabassoon, four horns, three trumpets, two trombones, bass trombone, tuba, six percussionists, celesta, harp, and strings.

== Reception ==
Reviewing the world premiere, Paul Driver of The Boston Globe described the work as "an astonishing synthesis of romantic and modern" and wrote, "Lieberson has learned how to charge his music with a potent internal magnetism; the notes seem to be attracted to each other in the old classical sense; there is real harmonic depth. Which is another way of saying that his concerto surges with creative energy."

Arnold Whittall of Gramophone was more critical of the work, however, remarking, "The biggest thing about the Concerto is its Buddhist subtext, since the three movements apparently reflect an interpretation of the Buddhist apprehension of earth, man and heaven. Those qualified to judge may believe that the music's inspiration matches this grand design. On a more mundane level, however, I can't feel that the music's inspiration matches either its length or its density." He added:

Much of the time, textures are more substantial than ideas, and music in such a relatively traditional style needs motives, basic thematic elements which seize the listener's attention and force him to follow their evolutionary adventures, if it is not to seem pretentious or aimless. Whatever the strength of Lieberson's religious convictions, therefore, the purely musical sources of the Concerto simply do not seem vital enough, and some undeniably striking and inventive writing in the third movement cannot compensate for such a pervasive gap between reach and grasp.
