= Peter Lieberson =

American classical composer (1946–2011)

Peter Goddard Lieberson (25 October 1946 – 23 April 2011) was an American composer of contemporary classical music. His song cycles include two finalists for the Pulitzer Prize for Music: Rilke Songs and Neruda Songs; the latter won the 2008 Grawemeyer Award for Music Composition and both were written for his wife, the mezzo-soprano Lorraine Hunt Lieberson. His three piano concertos were each premiered by the pianist Peter Serkin, with the 1st and 3rd also being Pulitzer finalists.

== Early life ==
Peter Goddard Lieberson was born in New York City. He was the son of ballerina and choreographer Vera Zorina (née Eva Brigitta Hartwig) and Goddard Lieberson, president of Columbia Records. Lieberson studied composition with Milton Babbitt, Charles Wuorinen, Donald Martino, and Martin Boykan. After completing his musical studies at Columbia University, he left New York in 1976 for Boulder, Colorado, to continue his studies with Chögyam Trungpa, a Tibetan Vajrayana Buddhist master. It was there he met and married Ellen Kearney, a fellow student of Trungpa's. At their teacher's request, the Liebersons moved from Boulder to Boston, Massachusetts, to co-direct Shambhala Training, a meditation and cultural program. Lieberson earned a Ph.D. from Brandeis University. From 1984 to 1988 he taught at Harvard University. He then became international director of Halifax Shambhala Centre in Halifax, Nova Scotia.

== Musical career ==
Beginning in 1994, Lieberson devoted his time entirely to composition. He met his second wife, mezzo-soprano Lorraine Hunt Lieberson, in 1997, during the Santa Fe Opera production of his work Ashoka's Dream; they married in 1999 after Lieberson and his first wife were divorced. He wrote his song cycles Rilke Songs and Neruda Songs for Hunt Lieberson. The Neruda Songs, a cycle of songs set to love poems by Pablo Neruda, were co-commissioned by the Los Angeles Philharmonic and the Boston Symphony; the world premiere was given on 20 May 2005, by the Los Angeles Philharmonic with Esa-Pekka Salonen conducting and Hunt Lieberson as soloist. The Boston Symphony performed the work in November 2005 with Hunt Lieberson as soloist and James Levine conducting, followed by performances with the Cleveland Orchestra, Robert Spano conducting. Hunt Lieberson died of breast cancer in July 2006, aged 52. Nonesuch released a commercial recording of the Boston/Levine performance of the Neruda Songs in 2006.

In December 2007, Lieberson won the 2008 University of Louisville Grawemeyer Award for Music Composition for Neruda Songs. Two different recordings of the Rilke Songs but Hunt Lieberson, one a studio production and the other a concert recording, have also been issued on the Bridge Records, Inc. label.

Lieberson was commissioned by the Boston Symphony to compose another cycle of Neruda songs, which became the Songs of Love and Sorrow. When he returned to the work, it was no longer simply a memorial and farewell to Hunt Lieberson, but also reflected the influence of his daughters and his third wife, Rinchen Lhamo. Lieberson had three daughters from his first marriage, all of whom are members of the band TEEN.

Shortly after Lorraine Hunt Lieberson's death, Lieberson was diagnosed with lymphoma. Despite the debilitating effects of the illness and its treatment, Lieberson went on composing. Though thought to have achieved full remission, he died from complications of the disease in 2011 in Tel Aviv, Israel. He had been living in Santa Fe, New Mexico, at the time of his death.

== Awards ==
- Charles Ives Scholarship
- National Institute of Arts and Letters
- Brandeis Creative Arts Award
- Grawemeyer Award for Music Composition
- American Academy of Arts and Letters

== Selected works ==
=== Opera ===
- Ashoka's Dream (1997)

=== Orchestral ===
- Drala (1986)
- The Gesar Legend (1988)
- World's Turning (1991)
- The Five Great Elements (1995)
- Processional (1995)
- Ah (2002)

=== Concertante ===
- Concerto for Four Groups of Instruments (1972)
- Concerto for Violoncello with Accompanying Trios (1974)
- Piano Concerto (1983)
- Viola Concerto (1992)
- Rhapsody for viola and orchestra (1994)
- Horn Concerto (1998)
- Red Garuda for piano and orchestra (1999)
- The Six Realms for cello and orchestra (2000)
- Piano Concerto No. 3 (2003)
- Shing Kham for percussion and orchestra (2010–11, finished by Oliver Knussen and Dejan Badnjar after the composer's death)

=== Chamber music ===
- Flute Variations for flute solo (1971)
- Accordance for 8 Instruments (1975)
- Tashi Quartet for clarinet, violin, cello and piano (1978)
- Lalita, Chamber Variations (1984)
- Feast Day for flute (also piccolo, alto flute), oboe, cello and harpsichord (or piano) (1985)
- Ziji for clarinet, horn, violin, viola, cello and piano (1987)
- Raising the Gaze for flute (also piccolo), clarinet (also bass clarinet), violin, viola, cello, piano and percussion (1988)
- Elegy for violin and piano (1990)
- Wind Messengers for 3 flute, 2 oboes, 2 clarinets (also bass clarinets), 2 bassoons and 2 horns (1990)
- A Little Fanfare for flute, trumpet, violin and harp (1991)
- A Little Fanfare (II) for clarinet, violin, viola, cello and piano (1993)
- Variations for violin and piano (1993)
- Rumble, Medley for viola, double bass and percussion (1994)
- String Quartet (1994)
- Three Variations for cello and piano (1996)
- Free and Easy Wanderer (1998)
- Piano Quintet (2001)
- Remembering Schumann for cello and piano (2009)

=== Piano ===
- Piano Fantasy (1975)
- Bagatelles (1985)
- Fantasy Pieces (1989)
1. Breeze of Delight
2. Dragon's Thunder
3. Memory's Luminous Wind
- Scherzo No. 1 (1989)
- Garland (1994)
- The Ocean that Has No West and No East (1997)
- Tolling Piece (1998)

=== Vocal ===
- Three Songs for soprano and chamber ensemble (1981)
- King Gesar for narrator and chamber ensemble (1991)
- C'mon Pigs of Western Civilization Eat More Grease for baritone and piano (2001)
- Forgiveness for baritone and cello (2001)
- Rilke Songs for mezzo-soprano and piano (2001)
- Neruda Songs for mezzo-soprano and orchestra (2005)
- The Coming of Light for baritone, oboe and string quartet (2009)
- Remembering JFK (An American Elegy) for narrator and orchestra (2010)
- Songs of Love and Sorrow for baritone and orchestra (2010)

=== Choral ===
- The World in Flower for mezzo-soprano, baritone, chorus and orchestra (2007)
