= Piano Concerto No. 3 (Lieberson) =

Piano concerto by Peter Lieberson

The Piano Concerto No. 3 is a composition for solo piano and orchestra by the American composer Peter Lieberson. The work was commissioned by the Minnesota Orchestra for the ensemble's centennial. It was given its world premiere by the pianist Peter Serkin and the Minnesota Orchestra in Minneapolis on November 26, 2003. The piece is dedicated to Peter Serkin and was a finalist for the 2004 Pulitzer Prize for Music.

== Composition ==
=== Background ===
The concerto was inspired by poetry Lieberson had read in the preceding years, particularly works by the Chilean poet Pablo Neruda (Lieberson would later further explore the works of Pablo Neruda in his 2005 song cycle Neruda Songs). The composer was first drawn to Neruda's poem "Leviathan," which depicts "a huge iceberg floating on the dark Arctic sea, illuminated by flashes of soft fluorescent light." Describing the language of the poem as "passionate and wrathful," Lieberson then decided that the concerto should be cast in five movements, each to be inspired by a different poem by a different poet.

Lieberson initially decided that the first movement would be inspired by the Canticle to the Sun of St. Augustine, but discovered halfway through its composition that the music was more fit for a second, slow movement. He then decided that the movement inspired by "Leviathan" should instead be the first movement. Lieberson had also sketched second and fourth movements based on poems by T. S. Eliot and Charles Wright, but soon realized that both were not intrinsic to the flow of the piece. The composer instead wrote a final movement inspired by Wright's poem "Dog Creek Mainline." Lieberson recalled, "So finally I ended up with a three-movement concerto, which is what I always wanted to write, but had found my way to it through these poems."

The piece is Lieberson's third piano concerto composed for Peter Serkin.

=== Structure ===
The concerto has a duration of roughly 30 minutes and is composed in three movements:

1. Leviathan
2. Canticle
3. Rondo

The second movement is dedicated to the memory of Lieberson's mother, who died before the work's completion.

=== Instrumentation ===
The work is scored for a solo piano and an orchestra comprising three flutes (3rd doubling piccolo), two oboes, English horn, three clarinets (3rd doubling E-flat clarinet and bass clarinet), two bassoons, contrabassoon, four horns, three trumpets, two trombones, bass trombone, tuba, timpani, four percussionists, harp, and strings.

== Reception ==
The concerto has been praised by music critics. Andrew Clements of The Guardian wrote, "Each of its three movements was inspired by a poem [...], but the concerto stands up well on its own purely musical terms, in a language that, like the first concerto, shows unashamed debts to the great 19th-century piano concerto tradition, while placing them in a world that is entirely Lieberson's own."
