= Piano Concerto No. 6 (Beethoven) =

Musical composition by Ludwig van Beethoven

Piano Concerto No. 6 in D major, Hess 15, is an unfinished piano concerto by German composer Ludwig van Beethoven. It is not to be confused with the transcription by the composer for piano and orchestra of the Violin Concerto in D major, Op. 61, which is sometimes referred to as the 6th Piano Concerto.

== Description ==
Beethoven spent a great deal of time on the concerto in estimated late 1814 and early 1815. He made about seventy pages of sketches for the first movement, and even started writing out a full score (MS Artaria 184 in the Staatsbibliothek zu Berlin). The score runs almost uninterrupted from the beginning of the movement to the middle of the solo exposition (bar 182), although the scoring becomes patchy as the work proceeds and there are signs of indecision or dissatisfaction on the composer's part. This partial movement (known as Hess 15) remains one of the most substantial of Beethoven's unrealized conceptions.

A completion of the first movement was reconstructed by British scholar Nicholas Cook in 1987.
