= Piano Concerto No. 2 (Hummel) =

Piano concerto by Johann Nepomuk Hummel

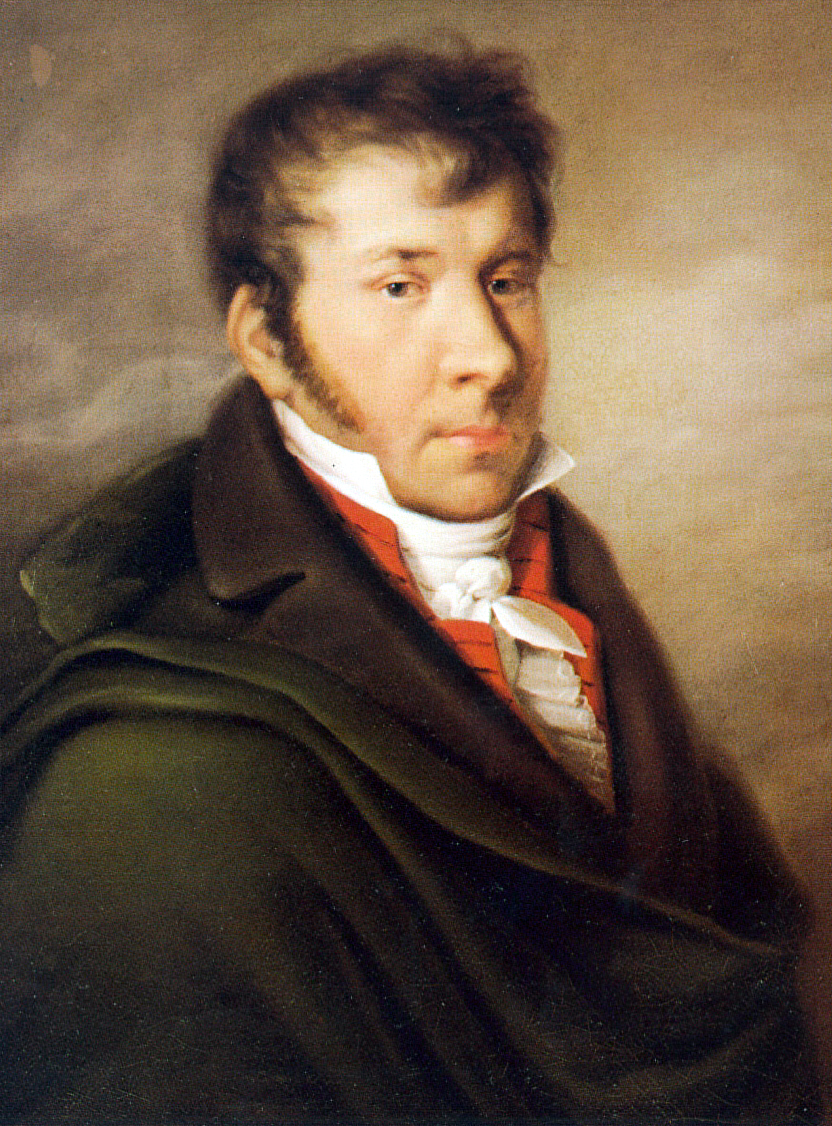
Portrait of Johann Nepomuk Hummel by Joseph Willibrord Mähler, c. 1814

Johann Nepomuk Hummel's Piano Concerto No. 2 in A minor, Op. 85 was written in 1816 and published in Vienna in 1821.

Unlike his earlier piano concerti, which closely followed the model of Mozart's, it is written in a proto-Romantic style that anticipates the later stylistic developments of composers such as Frédéric Chopin, Franz Liszt and Felix Mendelssohn. In this regard, it is similar to the slightly later Piano Concerto No. 3. It was considered a showpiece of its time by pianists such as Robert Schumann.

== Music ==
The concerto is scored for piano, flute, two oboes, two clarinets, two bassoons, two horns, two trumpets, timpani, and strings.

The work is composed in traditional three-movement form. There is a solo transition in the second movement leading into the rondo without pause.

1. Allegro moderato (in A minor)
2. Larghetto (in F major)
3. Rondo: Allegro moderato (in A minor)

== Influence ==
Although Hummel's music, seen as essentially Mozartian in style, had fallen out of fashion by the 1830s, the A minor concerto nonetheless exercised considerable influence over a number of works that helped to usher in the Romantic style. Frédéric Chopin, who had played the Hummel concerti, drew from elements of the A minor concerto in his own piano concerti.

Musicologist Mark Kroll has suggested that Chopin's piano concerti in general were influenced by those of Hummel. The A minor concerto da camera of Charles-Valentin Alkan has also been noted for its debt to Hummel's style of writing for the keyboard.

While Robert Schumann was critical of much of Hummel's work as a composer, he had made a close study of the A minor concerto in 1828 and considered it one of the works (along with the F♯ minor piano sonata) of his "heyday". And in his own A minor concerto, Schumann makes reference to aspects of Hummel's virtuosic style.

== Recordings ==
- 1987 – Hummel: Piano Concertos, Stephen Hough, English Chamber Orchestra, Bryden Thomson.
