= Lorraine Hunt Lieberson =

American mezzo-soprano (1954-2006)

- Born: Lorraine Hunt; 1 March 1954; San Francisco, California, U.S.
- Died: 3 July 2006 (aged 52); Santa Fe, New Mexico
- Occupation: Opera singer (mezzo-soprano)
- Years active: 1985–2006
- Spouse: Peter Lieberson

Lorraine Hunt Lieberson (March 1, 1954 – July 3, 2006) was an American mezzo-soprano. She was noted for her performances of both Baroque era and contemporary works. Her career path to becoming a singer was unconventional – formerly a professional violist, Lieberson did not shift her full-time focus to singing until she was in her thirties.

== Life ==
One of four children, Lorraine Hunt was born to parents who were both involved with opera in the San Francisco Bay Area. Her mother, Marcia, was a contralto and music teacher and her father, Randolph, taught music in high school and college. She performed as a child in Engelbert Humperdinck's Hänsel & Gretel, as a gingerbread child. She returned to opera after taking part in a charity performance of the same work at a prison, this time taking Hänsel's role. After this performance, she auditioned for the Met, at the age of 29. She converted to Buddhism.

While rehearsing in his opera Ashoka's Dream at Santa Fe in 1997, she met composer Peter Lieberson. She married him two years later, changing her name to Lorraine Hunt Lieberson. Peter Lieberson's song cycles Rilke Songs and Neruda Songs, both available on CD, were composed especially for his wife.

Hunt Lieberson died from breast cancer in Santa Fe, New Mexico, on July 3, 2006, at the age of 52. Only a few years previously, she had nursed her sister through her final illness with the same disease. Her husband fell victim to cancer too, falling ill in 2007 and dying in April 2011.

== Career ==
Hunt Lieberson began her musical career as a violist, and became principal viola with the San Jose Symphony. At the age of 26, she turned to studying voice seriously at the Boston Conservatory of Music. Her professional career as a singer began in 1984, and in 1985 she made her operatic debut after meeting Peter Sellars, appearing in his 1985 production of Handel's Giulio Cesare. She began her career as a soprano, singing roles such as Handel's Theodora and Donna Elvira in Sellars's notorious production of Don Giovanni, but soon gravitated to the mezzo-soprano range. She began working with Craig Smith at Emmanuel Music as a violist, then sang in the chorus and began taking leading roles. Her work with Emmanuel continued throughout the 1980s and 1990s, and a recording of her work there in Bach and Handel was released in 2008 by Avie Records, Lorraine at Emmanuel.

Her debut performance at the Metropolitan Opera came during the 1999–2000 season, in eleven performances in the role of Myrtle Wilson in the world premiere of John Harbison's The Great Gatsby (first performance on December 20, 1999). During this same season, she also appeared as Sesto in the New York City Opera's production of Mozart's La clemenza di Tito, as well as playing La Pelerin in Kaija Saariaho's Clemence at the Salzburg Festival. Her only other appearances at the Met came in two gala performances where she sang the spiritual "Deep River" (1999), and the fourth act of Bizet's Carmen in 2000, and finally four performances in February, 2003 in the role of Dido in Berlioz's Les Troyens. She was scheduled to sing the role of Orfeo in a new production of Gluck's Orfeo ed Euridice. On her death, she was replaced by countertenor David Daniels, and the four performances run in May 2007 were dedicated to her memory.

Among the roles she sang during her career are Sesto (Mozart's La clemenza di Tito), Carmen (Bizet's opera of the same name), Beatrice (Berlioz's Beatrice et Benedict), Mélisande in Pelléas et Mélisande (concert performances under Bernard Haitink), Médée (title role of Charpentier's Médée, with William Christie and Les Arts Florissants), Phèdre (Jean-Philippe Rameau's Hippolyte et Aricie), Theodora and Irene (Handel's Theodora; Theodora at Göttingen with Nicholas McGegan, Irene at Glyndebourne with Christie), Minerva (Monteverdi's Il ritorno d'Ulisse in patria with René Jacobs), Ottavia (Monteverdi's L'incoronazione di Poppea with Marc Minkowski) and the title roles of Handel's Ariodante and Serse.

She made a number of recordings, including works of Bach and Handel, as well as modern works.

Those who worked with Hunt Lieberson have spoken of her intense commitment to the detail of bringing a piece to life. Canadian vocal coach Denise Massé said in a New Yorker magazine interview,

Lorraine is like Callas in her determination to dig as deeply as possible into the character — to find all the grain in the wood.

In June 2005, Hunt Lieberson made her last appearance in Amsterdam, performing the Sellars staging of Bach's Ich habe genug. Her final public performances were given on March 16, 17, and 18, 2006, at Orchestra Hall in Chicago, in Mahler's Symphony No. 2 (Resurrection) with the Chicago Symphony Orchestra and Chorus, conductor Michael Tilson Thomas and soprano Celena Shafer.

In 2007, she posthumously received the Grammy Award for Best Classical Vocal Performance for her recording of her husband's Rilke Songs, and in 2008 won again posthumously for her performance of her husband's Neruda Songs.

== Recordings ==
Besides those mentioned above, her most recent recordings include two of Johann Sebastian Bach's Cantatas, BWV 82 (Ich habe genug) and BWV 199 (Mein Herze schwimmt im Blut), which made the New York Times top 10 classical albums of the year and No. 3 on the Billboard classical chart. Musical America recognized her as the 2001 Vocalist of the Year.

In the late 1980s and early 1990s, before her marriage to Peter Lieberson, Lorraine Hunt rose to prominence in the repertoire of George Frideric Handel. She performed and recorded opera and oratorios with the Göttingen International Handel Festival, under Nicholas McGegan's direction. Her recordings include Ariodante, Serse, Messiah (as a soprano), Clori, Tirsi e Fileno, Theodora, Susanna, and two CDs of Handel arias. For the oratorio Theodora, she sang the roles of both Irene and the title character; she has also recorded Henry Purcell's incidental music for The Fairy-Queen and the title role of Dido and Aeneas with McGegan.

Hunt Lieberson's 1999 debut at Wigmore Hall, a performance of lieder by Schumann (Frauen-Liebe und Leben, Op. 42) and Brahms (Op. 57) with the pianist Julius Drake, was released as a live recording.
