= Piano Concerto No. 3 (Hummel) =

3rd piano concerto by Hummel

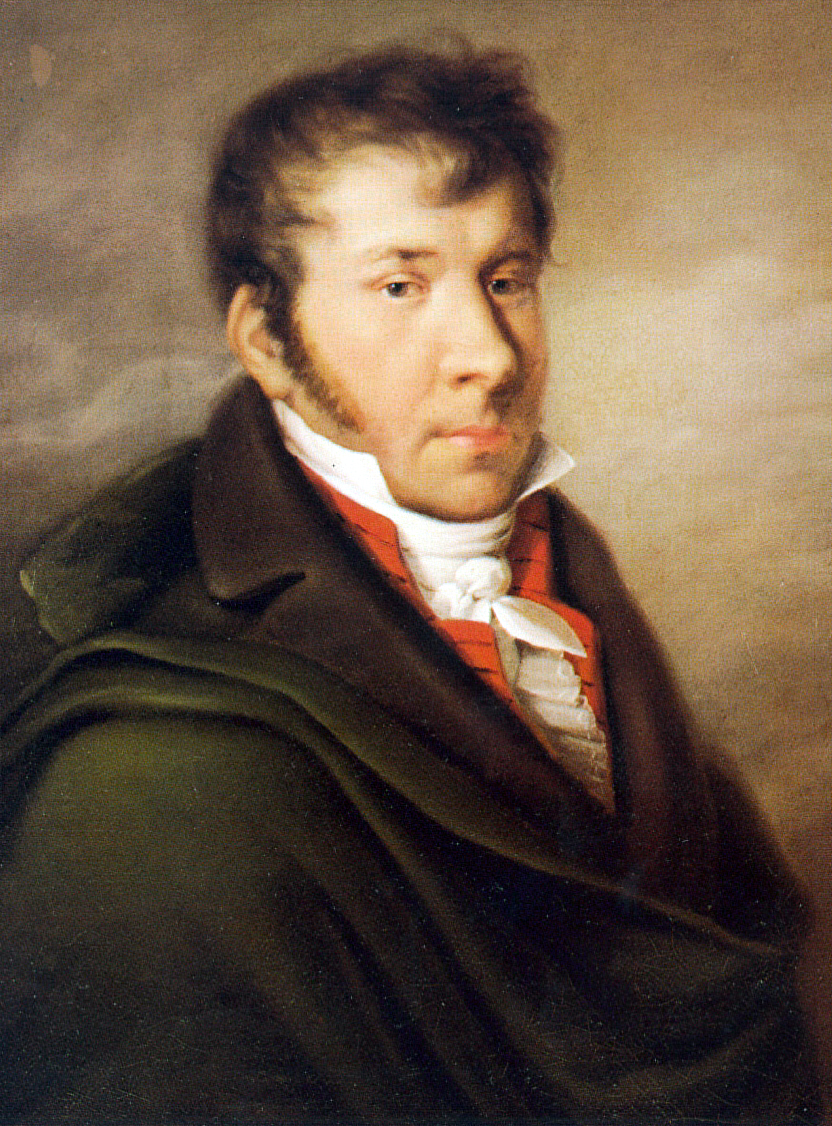
Portrait of Johann Nepomuk Hummel by Joseph Willibrord Mähler, c. 1814

Johann Nepomuk Hummel's Piano Concerto No. 3 in B minor, Op. 89 was composed in Vienna in 1819 and published in Leipzig in 1821.

Along with the slightly earlier Concerto No. 2, it is written in a proto-Romantic style that anticipates the later stylistic developments of composers such as Frédéric Chopin, Robert Schumann, Felix Mendelssohn and Franz Liszt.

The work was a favourite of Liszt in his early career. After the teenager performed it at the Paris Opera, François-Joseph Fétis, musicologist and editor of Revue Musicale, published a very unfavourable review. He was particularly critical of the speed with which Liszt took the Rondo finale.

== Music ==
The work is scored for piano, flute, two oboes, two clarinets in A, two bassoons, four horns in D, G, and B, two trumpets in B, timpani, and strings. Notable is the sparsely scored second movement nocturne, accompanied by only the horns, cellos, and basses.

The work is composed in traditional three-movement form.

1. Allegro moderato (B minor)
2. Larghetto (G major)
3. Finale: Vivace (B minor – B major)

== Recordings ==
- 1987 – Hummel: Piano Concertos, Stephen Hough, English Chamber Orchestra, Bryden Thomson.
