= Piano Concerto No. 8 (Ries) =

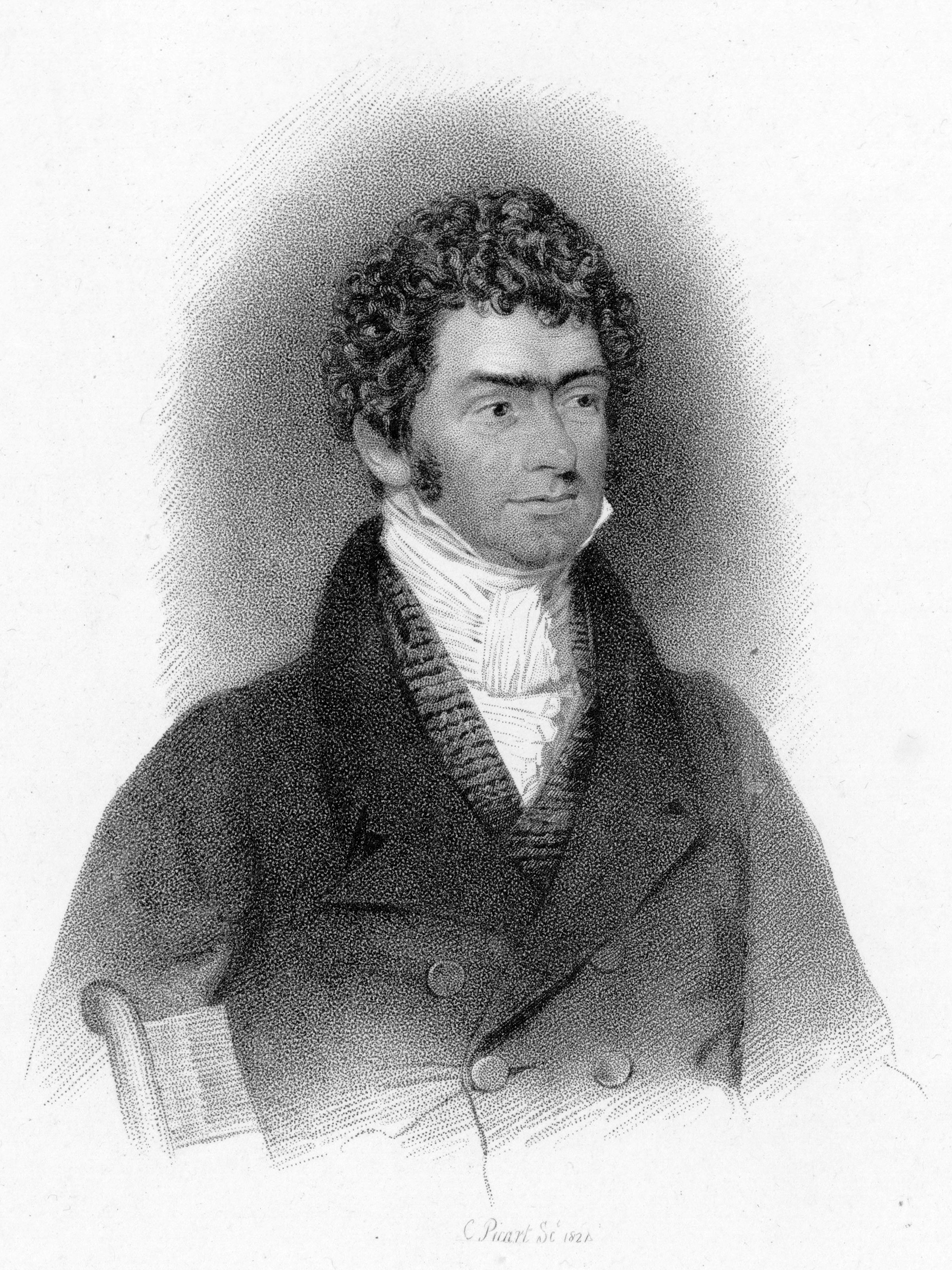
Ferdinand Ries in 1821

The Piano Concerto No. 8 in A♭ major, Op. 151 "Gruss an den Rhein" (French: "Salut au Rhin") (English: "Greetings to the Rhine"), by Ferdinand Ries was composed around 1826 and published in 1829 by Simrock. While still showing the structural influence of Beethoven's piano concertos, the writing for the piano is more akin to that of later composers such as Chopin, Mendelssohn & Schumann.

== Composition history ==
Ries composed this work in 1826, some two years after his return from England and approximately two years after the publication of the last of his early piano concerti (Opp. 123 & 132). Allan Badley comments that this would most likely make it the seventh of Ries's eight piano concertos to be written. (Note: Concerto no. 8 refers to the order of publication, not composition, and likewise for all of Ries's concertos.) As he was no longer an active concert pianist publication by N. Simrock, bearing a dedication to Godefroi Weber followed within a year.

== Structure ==
The concerto follows the traditional three-movement structure:

1. Allegro con moto
2. Larghetto con moto
3. Rondo: Allegro molto

A typical performance of the work lasts around 28 to 30 minutes.

== Recordings ==
Notable recordings of this composition include:

Pianist	Conductor	Orchestra	Record Company	Year of Recording	Format
Christopher Hinterhuber	Uwe Grodd	New Zealand Symphony Orchestra	Naxos	2005	CD
Piers Lane	Leon Botstein	The Orchestra Now	Hyperion	2018	CD
