= Piano Concerto No. 6 (Ries) =

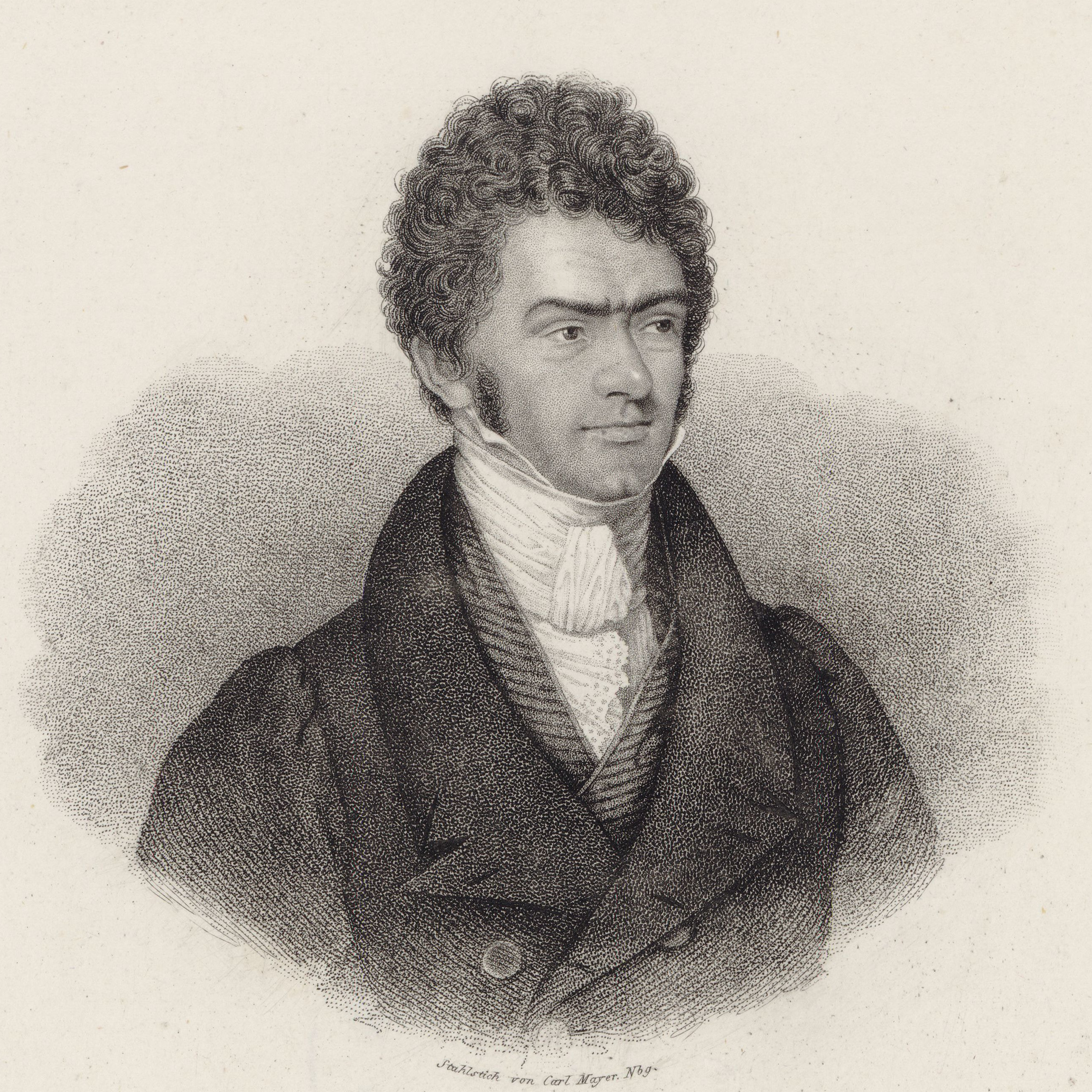
Ries

The Piano Concerto No. 6 in C major, Op. 123, by Ferdinand Ries was composed around 1806. Composed in a proto-Romantic style, similar to the concertos of Johann Nepomuk Hummel, it also shows evidence of the influence of Beethoven's C minor Piano Concerto, Op. 37 which Ries had performed at his public debut in 1804.

== Composition date ==
The manuscript bears the notation "Bonn 1806", suggesting it was completed there. Allan Badley, in the notes to the Naxos recording comments that this would most likely make it the first of Ries's eight piano concertos to be written. (Note: Concerto no. 6 refers to the order of publication, not composition, and likewise for all of Ries's concertos.) Further evidence for this lies in the fact that this is the only piano concerto by Ries to provide for a cadenza at the end of the first movement, as was traditional. Publication, as the composers Op. 123 by firm of Sauer & Leidesdorf did not take place until around 1823/24.

== Structure ==
The concerto follows the traditional three-movement structure:

1. Allegro con spirito
2. Larghetto quasi andante
3. Introduzione: Adagio maestoso - Rondo: Allegro vivace

== Recordings ==
To date the concerto has only been recorded once, by Uwe Grodd with the New Zealand Symphony Orchestra and soloist Christopher Hinterhuber, this was released by Naxos Records (Note: Paired with a recording of the composers Op. 151 concerto.) in conjunction with a publication of the score in a critical edition prepared by Allen Bradley.
