= Peter Serkin =

American pianist (1947–2020)

- Born: Peter Adolf Serkin; July 24, 1947; New York City, U.S.
- Died: February 1, 2020 (aged 72); Red Hook, New York, U.S.
- Education: Curtis Institute of Music
- Occupations: Classical pianist; Academic teacher
- Organizations: Curtis Institute of Music; Juilliard School; Yale University; Bard College
- Spouses: Wendy Spinner (divorced 1979); Regina Touhey (divorced 2018)
- Children: 5
- Parents: Rudolf Serkin (father); Irene Busch Serkin (mother)
- Awards: Grammy Award

Peter Adolf Serkin (July 24, 1947 – February 1, 2020) was an American classical pianist. He won the Grammy Award for Most Promising New Classical Recording Artist in 1966, and he performed globally, known for not only "technically pristine" playing but also a "commitment to contemporary music". He taught at the Curtis Institute of Music, the Juilliard School, Yale University, and Bard College.

== Early life ==
Serkin was born on July 24, 1947, in Manhattan. He was the son of Irene Busch Serkin and pianist Rudolf Serkin, grandson of the influential violinist Adolf Busch, and great-nephew of conductor Fritz Busch. Peter was given the middle name Adolf in honor of his grandfather. He spent much of his childhood on his parents' farm in Guilford, Vermont.

In 1958, at age 11, Serkin began studying at the Curtis Institute of Music, where his teachers included the Polish pianist Mieczysław Horszowski, the American virtuoso Lee Luvisi, as well as his own father. He graduated in 1964 at age 16. He also studied with Ernst Oster, flutist Marcel Moyse, and Karl Ulrich Schnabel.

== Career ==
External audio
- You may listen to Peter Serkin conducting the Marlboro Festival Orchestra with Rudolf Serkin performing Ludwig van Beethoven's Choral Fantasy, Op. 80 in 1981; Here on Archive.org
- Peter Serkin joins Rudolf Serkin, Mieczyslaw Horszowski and the Marlboro Festival Orchestra in: Johann Sebastian Bach's Concerto in C major For Three Pianos, BWV 1064; Wolfgang Amadeus Mozart's Concerto No. 10 in E flat major, K. 365 For Two Pianos in 1966 Here on Archive.org

Serkin's concert career began in 1958, when he first performed at the Marlboro Music Festival, a seminal agent and incubator of chamber music performance in the U.S., established in 1951 by his father Rudolf Serkin, Hermann and Adolf Busch, and Marcel, Blanche and Louis Moyse. Following that performance, Peter Serkin was invited to play with major orchestras such as the Cleveland Orchestra under George Szell and the Philadelphia Orchestra with Eugene Ormandy. In 1966, at age 19, Serkin was awarded the Grammy Award for Most Promising New Classical Recording Artist. Three of his recordings garnered Grammy nominations (one of them features six Mozart concertos; the two others feature the music of Olivier Messiaen) and his recordings won other awards. Serkin was the first pianist to receive the Premio Internazionale Musicale Chigiana award in 1983 and he received an honorary doctorate from the New England Conservatory of Music in 2001.

In 1968, shortly after marrying and becoming a father, Serkin decided to stop playing music altogether. In the winter of 1971, he, his wife, and baby daughter Karina moved to a small rural town in Mexico. About eight months later, on a Sunday morning, Serkin heard the music of Johann Sebastian Bach being broadcast over the radio from a neighbor's house. As he listened, he said, "It became clear to me that I should play." He returned to the U.S. and began his musical career anew.

Henceforth, Serkin performed around the world with leading orchestras and conductors including Claudio Abbado, Daniel Barenboim, Herbert Blomstedt, Pierre Boulez, Seiji Ozawa, Simon Rattle, James Levine, and Christoph Eschenbach. He made numerous recordings, primarily for RCA Victor. He recorded Bach's Goldberg Variations five times, the first made when he was 17, the fourth when he was 47, the fifth when he was 70. He recorded music by Mozart, Beethoven, Schubert, Chopin, Brahms, and Dvořák as well as more recent composers such as Reger, Berg, Webern, Schoenberg, Hans Werner Henze, Takemitsu, Oliver Knussen, Peter Lieberson and Stefan Wolpe. A recording of Messiaen's Vingt Regards sur L'Enfant-Jésus at age 25 became iconic, with noted "deep understanding of the composer's sound-world and its emotional extremes, coupled with considerable instrumental prowess". In 2009, he recorded chamber music by Charles Wuorinen with the Brentano String Quartet.

Serkin was a committed performer of new and recent music. He played works as world premieres or that were dedicated to him, by composers such as Elliott Carter, Alexander Goehr, Knussen, Lieberson and Takemitsu. The American composer Ned Rorem writes of Serkin, "His uniqueness lies, as I hear it, in a friendly rather than over-awed approach to the classics, which nonetheless plays with the care and brio that is in the family blood, and he's not afraid to be ugly. He approaches contemporary music with the same depth as he does the classics, and he is unique among the superstars in that he approaches it at all."

Among prominent virtuosi, Peter Serkin was one of the first to experiment with period fortepianos, and the first to record late Beethoven sonatas on pianos of both the modern as well as Beethoven's era.

Serkin collaborated with Yo-Yo Ma, Lorraine Hunt Lieberson, András Schiff, Alexander Schneider, Pamela Frank, Harold Wright, the Guarneri Quartet, the Budapest Quartet, and other prominent musicians and ensembles, such as principal wind players of major American orchestras. In addition, he was one of the founding members of TASHI. He taught at the Juilliard School, the Curtis Institute of Music and the Yale School of Music and was on faculty at the Bard College Conservatory of Music. Among those who studied piano with him is Simone Dinnerstein.

== Personal life and death ==
Serkin was married to Wendy Spinner until their divorce in 1979; they had one daughter. He was then married to Regina Touhey, and had four children with her; they divorced in 2018. Serkin died from pancreatic cancer at his home in Red Hook, New York, on February 1, 2020.
