= List of compositions by Bohuslav Martinů =

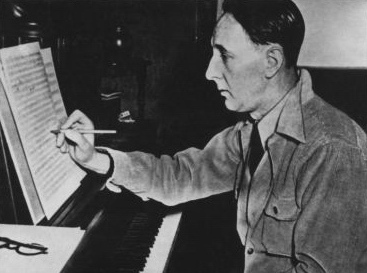
Bohuslav Martinů at the piano working on his second symphony. U.S.A., New York, around 1942^{image: Bohuslav Martinu Centre in Policka}

This is a list of compositions by Bohuslav Martinů by category. The date and place after each work are the date and place of origin. The catalog numbers with the prefix "H" are based on the comprehensive catalog of Martinů's works prepared by the Belgian musicologist Harry Halbreich, which was first published in 1968. A second revised and expanded edition was completed in 2006.

== Operas ==
- Voják a tanečnice (Soldier and Dancer), comic opera in three acts, H 162 (composed 1927 at Polička)
- Les Larmes du couteau (Tears of the Knife), opera in one act, H 169 (1928 Paris)
- Les Trois Souhaits ou Les vicissitudes de la vie (Three Wishes or Inconstancy of Life), film-opera in 3 acts with prelude and postlude, H 175 (1929 Paris)
- Le jour de bonté (Day of Kindness), opera in 3 acts, H 194 (1931 Paris)
- Hry o Marii (The Miracles of Mary), H 236 (1934 Paris)
- Hlas lesa (The Voice of the Forest), radio opera in 1 act, H 243 (1935 Paris)
- Veselohra na mostě (Comedy on the Bridge), radio opera in 1 act, H 247 (1935 Paris)
- Divadlo za branou (Theatre Behind the Gate), opera-ballet in 3 acts, H 251 (1936 Paris)
- Julietta (Snář) (Julietta (The key to Dreams)), lyric opera in 3 acts, H 253 (1937 Paris)
- Dvakrát Alexandr (Alexandre Bis, Alexander Twice), opera buffa in 1 act, H 255 (1937 Paris)
- What Men Live By, opera-pastorale in 1 act, H 336 (1952 New York)
- The Marriage, Comic Opera in 2 Acts, H 341 (1952 New York)
- Plainte contre inconnu (Accusation Against the Unknown), Opera in 3 Acts, H 344 (1953 Nice)
- Mirandolina, comic opera in 3 acts, H 346 (1953 Nice)
- Ariane, lyric opera in 1 act, H 370 (1958 Schönenberg-Pratteln)
- The Greek Passion, Opera in 4 acts, H 372 (1957, 2nd version 1959)

== Ballets ==
- Noc (Night), ballet in 1 act, H 89 (1914 Polička)
- Tance se závoji (Dances with a Veils), meloplastic dance scenes, H 93 (1914 Polička)
- Stín (The Shadow), ballet in 1 act, H 102 (1916 Polička)
- Koleda (Christmas Carol), ballet in 4 acts with singing, dancing and recitation, H 112 (1917 Polička)
- Istar, ballet in 3 acts, H 130 (1921 Polička, Prague)
- Kdo je na světě nejmocnější? (Who is the Most Powerful in the World?), ballet comedy in 1 act, H 133 (1922 Prague)
- Vzpoura (The Revolt), ballet sketch in 1 act, H 151 (1925 Paris, Prague)
- Motýl, který dupal (The Butterfly that Stamped), ballet in 1 act, H 153 (1926 Paris)
- Le Raid merveilleux (The Amazing Flight), mechanical ballet, H 159 (1927 Paris)
- La Revue de cuisine (The Kitchen Revue), jazz-ballet in 1 act, H 161 (1927 Paris)
- On Tourne, ballet in 1 act, H 163 (1927 Polička)
- Check to the King, jazz-ballet in 2 acts, H 186 (1930 Paris)
- Špalíček (The Chap-Book), ballet with singing in 3 acts, H 214 (1932 Paris)
- Le jugement de Paris (The judgement of Paris), ballet in 1 act, H 245 (1935 Paris)
- The Strangler, ballet for three dancers, H 317 (1948 New York)

== Orchestral ==
=== Symphonies ===
- Symphony No. 1, H 289 (1942 United States)
- Symphony No. 2, H 295 (1943 Darien, Conn.)
- Symphony No. 3, H 299 (1944 Ridgefield, Conn.)
- Symphony No. 4, H 305 (1945 New York)
- Symphony No. 5, H 310 (1946 New York)
- Symphony No. 6 Fantaisies symphoniques, H 343 (1953 New York, Paris)

=== Others ===
- Half-time, rondo for large orchestra, H 142 (1924 Polička)
- La Bagarre, Allegro for large orchestra, H 155 (1926 Paris)
- Rhapsody (Allegro Symphonique), for large orchestra, H 171 (1928 Paris)
- Partita, for string orchestra, H 212 (1931 Paris)
- Sinfonia Concertante for Two Orchestras, H 219 (1932 Paris)
- Inventions, symphonic composition in three movements, H 234 (1934)
- Concerto Grosso, for chamber orchestra, H 263 (1937 Paris)
- Tri Ricercari for chamber orchestra, H 267
- Double Concerto for Two String Orchestras, Piano, and Timpani, H 271 (1938 Vieux Moulin, Schönenberg)
- Memorial to Lidice, H 296 (1943 New York)
- Thunderbolt P-47, scherzo for orchestra, H 309 (1945 Cape Cod)
- Toccata e Due Canzoni, H 311 (1946 New York)
- Sinfonietta La Jolla for piano and chamber orchestra in A major, H 328 (1950 New York)
- Intermezzo for orchestra, H 330 (1950)
- Overture for Orchestra H 345 (1953 Nice)
- The Frescoes of Piero della Francesca, H 352 (1955 Nice)
- The Rock, Symphonic Prelude for Large Orchestra, H 363 (1957 Rome)
- The Parables, H 367 (1958 Rome, Schönenberg)
- Estampes for Orchestra, H 369 (1958 Schönenberg)

== Concertos ==
=== Piano ===
- Piano Concerto No. 1 in D, H 149 (1925 Polička)
- Divertimento (Concertino) in G for left-hand piano and small orchestra, H 173 (1926–1928 Paris)
- Piano Concerto No. 2, H 237 (1934 Paris [Malakoff])
- Concertino for Piano and Orchestra, H 269 (1938 Paris)
- Sinfonietta Giocosa for piano and chamber orchestra, H 282 (1940 Aix-en-Provence)
- Piano Concerto No. 3, H 316 (1948 New York)
- Piano Concerto No. 4 "Incantations", H 358 (1956 New York)
- Piano Concerto No. 5 "Fantasia concertante" in B♭ major, H 366 (1958 Schönenberg-Pratteln)

=== Violin ===
- Violin Concerto No. 1, H 226 (1933 Paris)
- Violin Concerto No. 2, H 293 (1943 New York)
- Concerto da Camera, for violin and string orchestra with piano and percussion, H 285 (1941 Edgartown, Mass.)
- Czech Rhapsody for violin and orchestra, H 307 A [see H 307] (1945 Cape Cod, South Orleans, Mass.)
- Suite Concertante for Violin and Orchestra in D major, H 276 I (1939 Paris), H 276 II (1944 New York)
- Concerto for Violin and Piano, H 13 (1910)

=== Cello ===
- Cello Concerto No. 1 in D, H 196 I (1930 Polička), H 196 II (1939 Paris), H 196 III (1955 Nice)
- Cello Concerto No. 2, H 304 (1945 New York)
- Concertino for Cello, Winds, Percussion and Piano in C minor, H 143 (1924 Paris)
- Sonata da Camera for violoncello and small orchestra, H 283 (1940 Aix-en-Provence)

=== Other solo instruments ===
- Concerto for harpsichord and small orchestra, H 246 (1935 Paris)
- Rhapsody Concerto, for viola and orchestra, H 337 (1952 New York)
- Concerto for Oboe and Small Orchestra, H 353 (1955 Nice)

=== Multiple instruments ===
- Concerto for String Quartet and Orchestra, H 207 (1931 Paris)
- Divertimento (Serenade No. 4) for Violin, Viola and Chamber Orchestra, H 215 (1932)
- Concertino for Piano Trio (Violin, Cello and Piano) and String Orchestra, H 232 (1933 Paris)
- Concerto for Flute, Violin and Orchestra, H 252 (1936 Paris)
- Duo Concertante (Concerto No. 1) for Two Violins and Orchestra, H 264 (1937 Nice)
- Concerto for Two Pianos and Orchestra, H 292 (1943 New York)
- Sinfonia Concertante No. 2 in B♭ major (Violin, Cello, Oboe, Bassoon and Orchestra with Piano), H 322 (1949 New York)
- Concerto for Two Violins and Orchestra No. 2 in D major, H 329 (1950 New York)
- Concerto for Violin, Piano, and Orchestra, H 342 (1953 New York)

== Vocal ==
- Česká Rapsodie (Czech Rhapsody), cantata for baritone, mixed chorus, orchestra and organ, H 118 (1918 Polička)
- Svatební košile (The Spectre's Bride), Ballad for soprano, tenor, bass, mixed chorus and orchestra, H 214 I A (1932)
- Dvě písně na texty negerské poezie (Two songs with lyrics from black poetry), for vocal solo and piano, H 232bis (1932 Paris)
- Kytice (Bouquet of Flowers), Cycle on Folk Texts for Radio for soprano, alto, tenor, bass, children's chorus, mixed chorus and small orchestra, H 260 (1937); words by František Sušil and Karel Jaromír Erben
- Polní mše (Field Mass), cantata for baritone, male chorus and orchestra, H 279 (1939 Paris)
- Písničky na dve stránky (Songs on two pages, seven songs and Moravian folk poetry), for vocal solo and piano, H 302
- Gilgameš (The Epic of Gilgamesh), oratorio for soli, mixed chorus and orchestra, H 351 (1955 Nice)
- Otvírání studánek (The Opening of the Wells), cantata for soli, female chorus and instrumental accompaniment, H 354 (1955 Nice)
- Legenda z dýmu bramborové nati (Legend of the Smoke from Potato Fires), cantata for soli, mixed chorus and instrumental accompaniment, H 360 (1956 Rome)
- Romance z pampelišek (The Romance of the Dandelions), cantata for mixed chorus a cappella and soprano solo, H 364 (1957 Rome)

== Chamber ==
=== Duos for violin and piano ===
- Violin sonatas
  - Violin Sonata in C major, H 120 (1919 Polička)
  - Violin Sonata in D minor, H 152 (1926 Paris)
  - Violin Sonata No. 1, H 182 (1929 Paris)
  - Violin Sonata No. 2, H 208 (1931 Paris)
  - Violin Sonata No. 3, H 303 (1944 New York)
- Other
  - Impromptu, H 166 (1927 Paris)
  - Cinq pièces brèves (Five short pieces), H 184 (1930 Paris)
  - Romance, H 186bis (1930 Paris)
  - Études rythmiques (7 pieces), H 202 (1932 Paris)
  - Intermezzo, H 261 (1937 Paris)
  - Sonatina, H 262 (1937 Paris)
  - Five Madrigal Stanzas, H 297 (1943 New York) – dedicated to Albert Einstein
  - Czech Rhapsody, H 307 (1945 Cape Cod, South Orleans, Mass.)

=== Duos for cello and piano ===
- Cello sonatas
  - Cello Sonata No. 1, H 277 (1939 Paris)
  - Cello Sonata No. 2, H 286 (1941 Jamaica, Long Island)
  - Cello Sonata No. 3, H 340 (1952 Vieux-Moulin)
- Other
  - Ariette, H 188B (1930 Paris)
  - Nocturnes, H 189 (1931 Paris)
  - Pastorals, H 190 (1931 Paris)
  - Miniature Suite, H 192 (1931 Paris)
  - Seven Arabesques, H 201 (1931 Paris)
  - Variations on a Theme of Rossini, H 290 (1942 New York)
  - Variations on a Slovak Folk Song, H 378 (1959 Schönenberg-Pratteln)

=== Duos for other instruments and piano ===
- Scherzo for Flute and Piano, H 174 A (1929 Paris) (see also Sextetts, H 174)
- Flute Sonata, H 306 (1945)
- Viola Sonata, H 355 (1955)
- Clarinet Sonatina, H 356 (1956)
- Trumpet Sonatina, H 357 (1957)

=== Duos for other instruments without piano ===
- Duo No. 1 (Preludium – Rondo) for Violin and Cello, H 157 (1927 Paris)
- Three Madrigals (Duett No. 1) for Violin and Viola, H 313 (1947 New York)
- Duet No. 2 for Violin and Viola, H 331 (1950 New York)
- Divertimento for Two Recorders, H 365 (1957 Rome)
- Duo No. 2 for Violin and Cello in D major, H 371 (1958 Schönenberg-Pratteln)
- Piece for Two Cellos, H 377 (1959 Schönenberg-Pratteln)

=== Trios ===
- String trios
  - String Trio No. 1, H 136 (1923 Paris)
  - String Trio No. 2, H 238 (1934 Paris)
- Piano trios
  - Piano Trio No. 1, H 193 (1930 Paris)
  - Piano Trio No. 2 in D minor, H 327 (1950 New York)
  - Piano Trio No. 3 in C major, H 332 (1951 New York)
  - Bergerettes, five pieces for piano trio, H 275 (1939 Paris)
- Two violins and piano
  - Sonatina for Two Violins and Piano, H 198 (1930 Paris)
  - Sonata for Two Violins and Piano, H 213 (1932 Paris)
- Flute, violin and keyboard
  - Sonata for Flute, Violin and Piano, H 254 (1937 Paris)
  - Promenades for Flute, Violin and Harpsichord, H 274 (1939 Paris)
  - Madrigal-Sonata for Flute, Violin and Piano, H 291 (1942 New York )
- Other trios
  - Serenade No. 2, for two violins and viola, H 216 (1932 Paris)
  - Trio for Flute, Violin and Bassoon, H 265 (1937 Nice)
  - Four Madrigals, for oboe, clarinet and bassoon, H 266 (1938 Nice)
  - Trio for Flute, Cello and Piano, H 300 (1944 Ridgefield, Conn.)

=== Quartets ===
- String quartets
  - Tři Jezdci, H 1 (1902 Polička), aka Three Riders/Three Horsemen
  - String Quartet, H 60 (1912 Polička), lost
  - Two Nocturnes, H 63 (1912 Polička), lost
  - Andante, H 64 (1912 Polička), lost
  - String Quartet in E♭ minor, H 103 (1917 Polička), previously lost, reconstructed by Aleš Březina
  - String Quartet No. 1, H 117 (1918 Polička)
  - String Quartet No. 2, H 150 (1925 Paris)
  - String Quartet No. 3, H 183 (1929 Paris)
  - String Quartet No. 4, H 256 (1937 Paris)
  - String Quartet No. 5, H 268 (1938 Paris)
  - String Quartet No. 6, H 312 (1946 New York)
  - String Quartet No. 7 Concerto da camera, H 314 (1947 New York)
- Other quartets
  - Quartet for clarinet, horn, cello & side-drum, H 139 (1924)
  - Piano Quartet, H 287 (1942 Jamaica, Long Island, New York)
  - Oboe Quartet (oboe, violin, cello, and piano), H 315 (1947 New York)
  - Mazurka-Nocturne (oboe, 2 violins, cello), H 325 (1949 Renova, Haute-Savoie), 7'

=== Quintets ===
- Piano Quintet, H 35 (1911 Polička)
- String Quintet (2 violins, 2 violas, and cello), H 164 (1927 Polička), 18'
- Piano Quintet No. 1, H 229 (1933 Paris), 19'
- Piano Quintet No. 2, H 298 (1944 New York), 28'
- Serenade (violin, viola, cello, & 2 clarinets), H 334 (1951 New York), 24'

=== Sextets ===
- Sextet for Winds and Piano in E♭ major, H 174 (1929 Paris), 15'
- Serenade I (2 clarinets, horn, 3 violins, viola), H 217 (1932 Paris), 7'
- String Sextet (2 violins, 2 violas, 2 cellos), H 224 (1932 Paris), 18'
- Musique de Chambre No. 1 "Les fêtes nocturnes" (violin, viola, cello, clarinet, harp, and piano), H 376 (1959 Schönenberg-Pratteln), 19'

=== Septets ===
- Les Rondes (oboe, clarinet, bassoon, trumpet, 2 violins, piano), H 200 (recte 199) (1930 Paris), 14'
- Serenade III (oboe, clarinet, 4 violins, cello), H 218 (1932 Paris), 7' 30"
- Fantasia for theremin (or ondes Martenot), Oboe, String Quartet and Piano, H 301 (1944 Ridgefield, Conn.)

=== Octet ===
- Posvícení (Der Fasching) Ein Dorfbild, H 2 (1907 Polička), 7'

=== Nonets ===
- Nonet No. 1 (wind quintet, string trio and piano), H 144 (1925 Paris), fragment
- Stowe pastorals (five recorders, clarinet, two violins and cello), H 335 (1951 New York), 10'
- Nonet No. 2 (wind quintet, string trio and double bass), H 374 (1959 Schönenberg-Pratteln), 16'

== Keyboard ==
=== Piano ===
- Sonata for Piano, H 350 (1954 – Nice, France)
- Ritornels (Les Ritournelles), H 227 (1932)
- Fantasie et Toccata, H 281 (1940)
- Film en miniature, H 148 (1925)
- Three Czech Dances, H 154
- Adagio-Memories, H 362 (1957)
- Seven Czech Dances, H 195
- Crotchets and Quavers (Čtvrtky a osminky), H 257
- Loutky (Puppets) (3 books, numbered by Martinů in reverse chronological order)
  - Loutky I, H 137 (1924 – Polička, Czechoslovakia/Paris, France)
  - Loutky II, H 116 (1918 – Polička, Czechoslovakia)
  - Loutky III, H 92 (1914 – Polička, Czechoslovakia)
- Etudes and Polkas, H 308 (1945 – South Orleans, Cape Cod, MA, USA) [3 books]
- Dumka (unnumbered), H 4 (1909 – Polička, Czechoslovakia)
- Dumka No. 1, H 249 (1936 – Paris, France)
- Dumka No. 2, H 250 (1936 – Paris, France)
- Dumka No. 3, H 285bis (1941 – Jamaica, NY, USA)

=== Two Pianos ===
- Three Czech Dances, H 324 (1949)

=== Harpsichord ===
- Deux Pièces pour Clavecin, H 244 (1935 Paris)
- Harpsichord Sonata, H 368 (1958 Schönenberg-Pratteln)
- Two Impromptus, H 381 (1959 Schönenberg-Pratteln)

=== Organ ===
- Vigilie, H 382 (1959 Schönenberg-Pratteln) (unfinished, completed by Bedřich Janáček)

== Table ==
H	Title	Subtitle	Category	Subcategory	Date of origin	Date of first performance	Link to BMI catalogue
1	Three Riders		Chamber Music	String Quartets	1902		item in IBM catalog
2	The Feast	for flute and string orchestra	Chamber Music	Octet	August 1907		item in IBM catalog
3	Elegy	for violin and piano	Chamber Music	Duos for Violin and Piano	April 1909		item in IBM catalog
4	Dumka	(lost)	Works for Keyboards	Piano	1909		item in IBM catalog
4bis	Piano Sketch of an Orchestral Composition		Orchestral Music	Works for Large Orchestra			item in IBM catalog
5	Five Waltzes		Works for Keyboards	Piano	4 February 1910		item in IBM catalog
6	Before You Know		Vocal Music	Works for Solo Voice and Piano	20 March 1910		item in IBM catalog
7	Outdoors	(lost)	Vocal Music	Works for Solo Voice and Piano	20 March 1910		item in IBM catalog
8	The Pastel		Vocal Music	Works for Solo Voice and Piano	20 March 1910		item in IBM catalog
8bis	Entry into My Sister's Album		Vocal Music	Works for Solo Voice and Piano	15 July 1910		item in IBM catalog
9	The Drowned Maiden	(lost)	Vocal Music	Works for Solo Voice and Piano	1910		item in IBM catalog
10	When We Are Old		Vocal Music	Works for Solo Voice and Piano	1910		item in IBM catalog
11	Workmen of the Sea	(unfinished sketch)	Orchestral Music	Works for Large Orchestra	20 April 1910		item in IBM catalog
12	Romance	(lost)	Chamber Music	Duos for Violin and Piano	1910		item in IBM catalog
13	Concerto		Chamber Music	Duos for Violin and Piano	1910		item in IBM catalog
14	Two Little Songs in the Folk Tone		Vocal Music	Works for Solo Voice and Piano	25 April 1910		item in IBM catalog
15	Death of Tintagiles	music to the puppet drama by Maurice Maeterlinck	Orchestral Music	Works for Large Orchestra	21 June 1910		item in IBM catalog
16	Funeral march	(lost)	Works for Keyboards	Piano	1910		item in IBM catalog
17	Angel of Death	symphonic poem for large orchestra	Orchestral Music	Works for Large Orchestra	13 July 1910		item in IBM catalog
18	Nocturne	(lost)	Vocal Music	Works for Solo Voice and Piano	1910		item in IBM catalog
19	The Sleeper		Vocal Music	Works for Solo Voice and Piano	21 July 1910		item in IBM catalog
20	Idyll	(lost)	Works for Keyboards	Piano	1910		item in IBM catalog
21	Two Songs		Vocal Music	Works for Solo Voice and Piano	6 August 1910		item in IBM catalog
22	Maiden's Dreams		Vocal Music	Works for Solo Voice and Piano	1910		item in IBM catalog
23	Singing and Music	(lost)	Vocal Music	Works for Solo Voice and Piano	1910		item in IBM catalog
24	Ballade	(unfinished sketch)	Works for Keyboards	Piano	1910		item in IBM catalog
25	Sousedská	(unfinished sketch)	Works for Keyboards	Piano	14 October 1910		item in IBM catalog
26	A Winter Night		Vocal Music	Works for Solo Voice and Piano	1910		item in IBM catalog
27	Kiss, My Sweetheart, Kiss		Vocal Music	Works for Solo Voice and Piano	17 October 1910		item in IBM catalog
27bis	Song about Kisses		Vocal Music	Works for Solo Voice and Piano	18 October 1910		item in IBM catalog
28	A Fairy-Tale of Goldilocks		Works for Keyboards	Piano	24 November 1910		item in IBM catalog
29	Moody Picture		Vocal Music	Works for Solo Voice and Piano	25 December 1910		item in IBM catalog
30	At Night		Vocal Music	Works for Solo Voice and Piano	19 July 1910		item in IBM catalog
31	Two Songs		Vocal Music	Works for Solo Voice and Piano	10 November 1911		item in IBM catalog
32	Berceuse	(lost)	Chamber Music	Duos for Violin and Piano	1911		item in IBM catalog
33	Adagio	(lost)	Chamber Music	Duos for Violin and Piano	1911		item in IBM catalog
34	Three Little Songs	(3rd song same as H. 27b)	Vocal Music	Works for Solo Voice and Piano	26 May 1911		item in IBM catalog
35	Piano Quintet		Chamber Music	Quintets	1 August 1911	2012	item in IBM catalog
36	Chanson Triste		Works for Keyboards	Piano	2 October 1911		item in IBM catalog
37	Jašek's song		Vocal Music	Works for Solo Voice and Piano	1911		item in IBM catalog
38	Song	(lost)	Vocal Music	Works for Solo Voice and Piano	1911		item in IBM catalog
39	The Soul is Dying	(lost)	Vocal Music	Works for Solo Voice and Piano	1911		item in IBM catalog
40	First Love	(lost)	Vocal Music	Works for Solo Voice and Piano	1911		item in IBM catalog
41	Tears		Vocal Music	Works for Solo Voice and Piano	December 1911		item in IBM catalog
42	Six Pieces from Andersen's Fairy-Tales		Works for Keyboards	Piano	7 January 1912		item in IBM catalog
43	The End of All		Vocal Music	Works for Solo Voice and Piano	14 January 1912		item in IBM catalog
44	Dead Love		Vocal Music	Works for Solo Voice and Piano	20 January 1912		item in IBM catalog
45	Symphony for Orchestra (1st movement)	(lost)	Orchestral Music	Symphonies	1912		item in IBM catalog
46	Song Without Words		Works for Keyboards	Piano	1912		item in IBM catalog
47	Nocturne		Works for Keyboards	Piano	3 April 1912		item in IBM catalog
48	You Write to Me		Vocal Music	Works for Solo Voice and Piano	18 March 1912		item in IBM catalog
49	Early in the Morning, I Weed the Grain		Vocal Music	Works for Solo Voice and Piano	10 March 1912		item in IBM catalog
50	Lucie	(lost)	Vocal Music	Works for Solo Voice and Piano	13 September 1912		item in IBM catalog
51	From Childhood		Vocal Music	Works for Solo Voice and Piano	16 March 1912		item in IBM catalog
52	Hoar-frost Fell to the Field	(lost)	Vocal Music	Works for Solo Voice and Piano	18 March 1912		item in IBM catalog
53	Marry Me Off, Mother		Vocal Music	Works for Solo Voice and Piano	20 March 1912		item in IBM catalog
54	The Rose		Vocal Music	Works for Solo Voice and Piano	1912		item in IBM catalog
55	That's All What Remains		Vocal Music	Works for Solo Voice and Piano	1912		item in IBM catalog
56	Ballad	to the Krzesz's picture "Last Chords of Chopin"	Works for Keyboards	Piano	1912	1912	item in IBM catalog
57	I See You Every Night, My Dear		Vocal Music	Works for Solo Voice and Piano	1 April 1912		item in IBM catalog
58	Offertorium	(unfinished sketch)	Chamber Music	Duos for Violin and Piano	28 March 1912		item in IBM catalog
59	Ave Maria	for soprano and organ (lost)	Vocal Music	Works for Solo Voice and Piano	1912		item in IBM catalog
59bis	Five Piano Pieces for Easter 1912	(lost)	Works for Keyboards	Piano	17 April 1912		item in IBM catalog
60	String Quartet	(lost)	Chamber Music	String Quartets	1912		item in IBM catalog
61	Andante for Orchestra (Sketch)	(lost)	Orchestral Music	Works for Large Orchestra	1912		item in IBM catalog
62	Fantasia		Chamber Music	Duos for Violin and Piano	July 1912	1912	item in IBM catalog
63	Two Nocturnes	(lost)	Chamber Music	String Quartets	1912	1912	item in IBM catalog
64	Andante	(lost)	Chamber Music	String Quartets	1912		item in IBM catalog
65	Ballad of Miss Vilma's Umbrella	(unifinished sketch)	Works for Keyboards	Piano	1912		item in IBM catalog
65bis	Chanson	(lost)	Works for Keyboards	Piano	1912		item in IBM catalog
66	Talk To Me Further		Vocal Music	Works for Solo Voice and Piano	22 August 1912		item in IBM catalog
67	Abandoned Sweetheart		Vocal Music	Works for Solo Voice and Piano	23 August 1912		item in IBM catalog
68	Nipponari	seven songs for female voice and small orchestra	Vocal Music	Works for Solo Voice and Orchestra	1912		item in IBM catalog
68 A	Nipponari	version for voice and piano	Vocal Music	Works for Solo Voice and Piano	October 1912		item in IBM catalog
69	Once upon a time		Vocal Music	Works for Solo Voice and Piano	3 September 1912		item in IBM catalog
70	On Blue Eyes		Vocal Music	Works for Solo Voice and Piano	17 October 1910		item in IBM catalog
71	The Fiery Man		Vocal Music	Works for Solo Voice and Piano	1912		item in IBM catalog
72	Song of the 1st November		Vocal Music	Works for Solo Voice and Piano	1912		item in IBM catalog
73	Three Maidens on a Bright Night		Vocal Music	Works for Solo Voice and Piano	October 1910		item in IBM catalog
74	An Old Song		Vocal Music	Works for Solo Voice and Piano	28 August 1913		item in IBM catalog
74bis	I am Striding, Striding between the Hills		Vocal Music	Works for Solo Voice and Piano	1912		item in IBM catalog
75	The Gnat's Wedding		Vocal Music	Works for Solo Voice and Piano	1912		item in IBM catalog
76	Let the Dawn Come, Oh God		Vocal Music	Works for Solo Voice and Piano	1912		item in IBM catalog
77	In the Garden at the Roost		Vocal Music	Works for Solo Voice and Piano			item in IBM catalog
78	The Swans	(lost)	Vocal Music	Works for Solo Voice and Piano	1912		item in IBM catalog
79	I Like Old Parks		Vocal Music	Works for Solo Voice and Piano	2 April 1912		item in IBM catalog
80	The Song about Hanička		Vocal Music	Works for Solo Voice and Piano	3 September 1912		item in IBM catalog
81	Blissfulness		Vocal Music	Works for Solo Voice and Piano	11 December 1912		item in IBM catalog
82	Three Melodramas: Evening		Vocal Music	Melodramas	1913		item in IBM catalog
83	Three Melodramas: Dragonfly		Vocal Music	Melodramas	1913		item in IBM catalog
84	Three Melodramas: Dancers from Java		Vocal Music	Melodramas	1913		item in IBM catalog
85	Prelude (on the theme of Marseillaise)		Works for Keyboards	Piano	1913		item in IBM catalog
86	Prelude No. 2		Works for Keyboards	Piano	1913		item in IBM catalog
86bis	Prelude		Works for Keyboards	Piano	28 August 1913		item in IBM catalog
87	Song to an Old Spanish Text	for alto and piano	Vocal Music	Works for Solo Voice and Piano	December 1914		item in IBM catalog
88	Three Songs to French Texts		Vocal Music	Works for Solo Voice and Piano	1913		item in IBM catalog
89	The Night	Nocturne. Meloplastic scene in 1 act	Stage Works and Film Music	Ballets	9 January 1914		item in IBM catalog
90	Composition for Large Orchestra		Orchestral Music	Works for Large Orchestra	1914		item in IBM catalog
91	Nocturne No. 1		Orchestral Music	Works for Large Orchestra	1915	1967	item in IBM catalog
92	Puppets III	four pieces for piano	Works for Keyboards	Piano	1914		item in IBM catalog
93	Dances with Veils	(lost)	Stage Works and Film Music	Ballets	July 1914		item in IBM catalog
94	Four Little Songs to Goethe's Text	(4th song lost)	Vocal Music	Works for Solo Voice and Piano			item in IBM catalog
95	Nocturne	to the picture 'Přečtený román" by J. Mánes	Works for Keyboards	Piano	June 1915		item in IBM catalog
96	Nocturne (Roses in the Night)	symphonic dance No. 2 (lost)	Orchestral Music	Works for Large Orchestra	1915		item in IBM catalog
97	Ballad on Böcklin's Painting “Villa by the Sea”	Symphonic dance No. 4	Orchestral Music	Works for Large Orchestra	1915		item in IBM catalog
98	Three Lyric Pieces	for piano	Works for Keyboards	Piano	November 1915		item in IBM catalog
99	Spring song		Works for Keyboards	Piano	1915		item in IBM catalog
100	Ruyana (Sea Phantasy)		Works for Keyboards	Piano	February 1916		item in IBM catalog
101	Six Polkas		Works for Keyboards	Piano	June 1916		item in IBM catalog
102	The Shadow	ballet in one act	Stage Works and Film Music	Ballets	December 1916		item in IBM catalog
103	String Quartet in E♭ major		Chamber Music	String Quartets	1917	1994	item in IBM catalog
104	Burlesque	(lost)	Works for Keyboards	Piano	February 1917	1917	item in IBM catalog
105	Snow	(lost)	Works for Keyboards	Piano	1917	1917	item in IBM catalog
106	How Dear To Me the Hour		Vocal Music	Works for Solo Voice and Piano	26 March 1917		item in IBM catalog
107	Valse Capriccio	(lost)	Works for Keyboards	Piano	February 1917		item in IBM catalog
108	Mood	(lost)	Works for Keyboards	Piano	1917		item in IBM catalog
109	Furiant	(lost)	Works for Keyboards	Piano	1917		item in IBM catalog
110	Six Simple Songs		Vocal Music	Works for Solo Voice and Piano	1917	1965	item in IBM catalog
111	Shepherd's Sunday Song	(lost)	Vocal Music	Works for Solo Voice and Piano	1917	1918	item in IBM catalog
112	Christmas Carol	ballet in four acts with singing, dancing and recitation (lost)	Stage Works and Film Music	Ballets	1917		item in IBM catalog
113	Summer Suite	six lyrical pieces for piano (lost)	Works for Keyboards	Piano	1918		item in IBM catalog
114	Lullabies	(lost)	Vocal Music	Works for Solo Voice and Piano	1918	1920	item in IBM catalog
115	Three Songs	(lost)	Vocal Music	Works for Solo Voice and Piano	1918	1920	item in IBM catalog
116	Puppets II	five pieces for piano	Works for Keyboards	Piano	1918		item in IBM catalog
117	String Quartet No. 1		Chamber Music	String Quartets	1918	1927	item in IBM catalog
118	Czech Rhapsody	for orchestra, baritone, mixed choir and organ	Vocal Music	Cantatas with Orchestra	June 1918	1919	item in IBM catalog
119	Magic Nights	three songs for soprano and orchestra	Vocal Music	Works for Solo Voice and Orchestra	November 1918	1924	item in IBM catalog
120	Sonata in C major		Chamber Music	Duos for Violin and Piano	2 February 1919		item in IBM catalog
121	Two Male Choruses	set to Lithuanian folk texts (lost)	Vocal Music	Choir a Cappella	1919	1919	item in IBM catalog
121bis	Prélude	(lost)	Works for Keyboards	Piano		1919	item in IBM catalog
122	The Cat's Procession in the Solstice Night		Works for Keyboards	Piano	1919		item in IBM catalog
122bis	The Little Lullaby		Works for Keyboards	Piano	30 October 1919		item in IBM catalog
123	Little Dance Suite	for large orchestra	Orchestral Music	Works for Large Orchestra	26 October 1919		item in IBM catalog
123bis	Foxtrot born "On the Corner"		Works for Keyboards	Piano	May 1920		item in IBM catalog
124	A Dream of the Past	for large orchestra	Orchestral Music	Works for Large Orchestra	1920		item in IBM catalog
124bis	Andante		Orchestral Music	Works for Large Orchestra			item in IBM catalog
125	Spring in the Garden	four piano pieces for children	Works for Keyboards	Piano	1920		item in IBM catalog
125bis	The Ceremonial March of "Kytara"		Works for Keyboards	Piano	12 August 1920		item in IBM catalog
126	The New Slovak Songs	30 songs in two sets	Vocal Music	Works for Solo Voice and Piano	1920	1920	item in IBM catalog
126bis	Foxtrot		Works for Keyboards	Piano	1920		item in IBM catalog
127	Butterflies and Birds of Paradise	three pieces for piano	Works for Keyboards	Piano	December 1920		item in IBM catalog
127bis	One-step		Works for Keyboards	Piano	1 January 1921		item in IBM catalog
127ter	The Spring		Works for Keyboards	Piano	April 1921		item in IBM catalog
128	Evening at the Shore	three little piano pieces	Works for Keyboards	Piano	May 1921		item in IBM catalog
129	Three Songs for the Cabaret "Red Seven"		Vocal Music	Works for Solo Voice and Piano	1921		item in IBM catalog
129bis	Victory March (of the R.U.R. Sports Club in Polička)		Works for Keyboards	Piano	1 July 1921		item in IBM catalog
130	Istar	ballet in 3 acts	Stage Works and Film Music	Ballets	21 November 1921	1924	item in IBM catalog
130 A	First Orchestral Suite From the Ballet "Istar"		Orchestral Music	Suites and Abstracts of the Incidental	1921		item in IBM catalog
130 B	Second Orchestral Suite From the Ballet "Istar"		Orchestral Music	Suites and Abstracts of the Incidental	1921		item in IBM catalog
130 C	Istar: The Dance of the Priestesses	addition to the first act	Orchestral Music	Suites and Abstracts of the Incidental	November 1923		item in IBM catalog
131	Vanishing Midnight	cycle of symphonic poems for large orchestra	Orchestral Music	Works for Large Orchestra	1922	1923	item in IBM catalog
132	Improvisation in the Spring	(lost)	Works for Keyboards	Piano	1922		item in IBM catalog
133	Who is the Most Powerful in the World?	ballet comedy in 1 act	Stage Works and Film Music	Ballets	1922	1925	item in IBM catalog
133 A	Orchestral suite from the ballet Who is the Most Powerful in the World?		Orchestral Music	Suites and Abstracts of the Incidental	1922		item in IBM catalog
134	Folk Dances and Customs of the Slovácko Region	music for the documentary film	Stage Works and Film Music	Film Music	1922		item in IBM catalog
135	The Months	three songs with piano	Vocal Music	Works for Solo Voice and Piano	1922	1925	item in IBM catalog
135bis	Two Songs on Russian Poetry		Vocal Music	Works for Solo Voice and Piano	September 1922		item in IBM catalog
136	String Trio No. 1	for violin, viola and violoncello	Chamber Music	Trios without Piano	December 1923		item in IBM catalog
137	Puppets I	five pieces for piano	Works for Keyboards	Piano	September 1925		item in IBM catalog
138	Fables		Works for Keyboards	Piano	1924		item in IBM catalog
138bis	Scherzo		Works for Keyboards	Piano	10 February 1924	1972	item in IBM catalog
139	Quartet for Clarinet, French Horn, Violoncello and Snare Drum	in C major	Chamber Music	Quartets for Various Instruments	April 1924		item in IBM catalog
140	Prelude		Works for Keyboards	Piano	May 1924		item in IBM catalog
141	Piano piece (without title)		Works for Keyboards	Piano	1924		item in IBM catalog
142	Half-time	rondo for large orchestra	Orchestral Music	Works for Large Orchestra	1924	1924	item in IBM catalog
143	Concertino for violoncello, brass, piano and battery	in C minor	Concertos	Violoncello Concertos	15 December 1924	1949	item in IBM catalog
144	Nonet No.1	for flute, clarinet, oboe, bassoon, French horn, violin, viola, violoncello and piano (first two movements lost)	Chamber Music	Nonets	1925		item in IBM catalog
145	Instructive Duo for the Nervous People		Works for Keyboards	Piano	20 February 1925		item in IBM catalog
146	Children's Songs	in two sets	Vocal Music	Works for Solo Voice and Piano	1925		item in IBM catalog
146bis	Three Lullabies		Vocal Music	Works for Solo Voice and Piano	May 1925		item in IBM catalog
147	Chinese Songs		Vocal Music	Works for Solo Voice and Piano	1925		item in IBM catalog
148	Film en Miniature	cycle of piano pieces	Works for Keyboards	Piano	1925	1927	item in IBM catalog
149	Concerto for Piano and Orchestra No. 1	in D major	Concertos	Piano Concertos	September 1925	1926	item in IBM catalog
150	String Quartet No. 2		Chamber Music	String Quartets	30 September 1925	1925	item in IBM catalog
151	The Revolt	ballet sketch in 1 act	Stage Works and Film Music	Ballets	1 November 1925	1928	item in IBM catalog
152	Sonata in D Minor.	for violin and piano	Chamber Music	Duos for Violin and Piano	February 1926	1963	item in IBM catalog
153	The Butterfly that Stamped	ballet in 1 act	Stage Works and Film Music	Ballets	9 March 1926		item in IBM catalog
153 A	Orchestral suite from the ballet The Butterfly that Stamped		Orchestral Music	Suites and Abstracts of the Incidental	9 March 1926		item in IBM catalog
154	Three Czech Dances	for piano	Works for Keyboards	Piano	December 1926	1927	item in IBM catalog
155	La Bagarre (The Tumult)	Allegro for large orchestra	Orchestral Music	Works for Large Orchestra	May 1926	1927	item in IBM catalog
156	Habanera		Works for Keyboards	Piano	1926		item in IBM catalog
157	Duo for Violin and Violoncello No. 1		Chamber Music	Duos for Other Instruments	26 January 1927	1927	item in IBM catalog
157bis	The Hands		Stage Works and Film Music	Ballets		2011	item in IBM catalog
158	For Dance		Works for Keyboards	Piano	February 1927		item in IBM catalog
159	The Amazing Flight	a mechanical ballet	Stage Works and Film Music	Ballets	17 September 1927	1980	item in IBM catalog
160	Three Sketches		Works for Keyboards	Piano	1 April 1927		item in IBM catalog
161	The Kitchen Revue	jazz ballet in 1 act	Stage Works and Film Music	Ballets	23 April 1927	1927	item in IBM catalog
161 A	The Kitchen Revue	jazz-suite from the ballet in 1 act	Orchestral Music	Suites and Abstracts of the Incidental	1927	1930	item in IBM catalog
161 B	The Kitchen Revue	for piano	Works for Keyboards				item in IBM catalog
162	The Soldier and the Dancer	comic opera in 3 acts	Stage Works and Film Music	Operas	19 June 1927	1928	item in IBM catalog
162 A	Ouverture of the opera The Soldier and the Dancer		Orchestral Music	Suites and Abstracts of the Incidental	20 August 1926		item in IBM catalog
163	On Tourne!	ballet in 1 act	Stage Works and Film Music	Ballets	2 September 1927	1979	item in IBM catalog
164	String Quintet for Two Violins, Two Violas and Violoncello	for Two Violins, Two Violas and Violoncello	Chamber Music	Quintets	5 October 1927		item in IBM catalog
165	Black Bottom		Works for Keyboards	Piano	9 October 1927		item in IBM catalog
166	Impromptu	three compositions for violin and piano	Chamber Music	Duos for Violin and Piano	1927		item in IBM catalog
167	Christmas	three pieces for piano	Works for Keyboards	Piano	December 1927		item in IBM catalog
168	Le Jazz		Orchestral Music	Works for Large Orchestra	January 1928		item in IBM catalog
169	Tears of the Knife	opera in one act	Stage Works and Film Music	Operas	24 March 1928	1969	item in IBM catalog
170	Four Movements		Works for Keyboards	Piano	23 March 1929		item in IBM catalog
171	Rhapsody	for large orchestra	Orchestral Music	Works for Large Orchestra	14 May 1928	1928	item in IBM catalog
172	Jazz Suite	for small orchestra	Orchestral Music	Works for Chamber or Small Orchestra	September 1928		item in IBM catalog
173	Divertimento (Concertino)	for piano left hand and orchestra in G	Concertos	Piano Concertos	31 March 1926	1947	item in IBM catalog
173bis	Par T.S.F.		Works for Keyboards	Piano	1929		item in IBM catalog
174	Sextet	for wind instruments and piano	Chamber Music	Sextets	4 February 1929		item in IBM catalog
174 A	Scherzo (Divertimento)	for Flute and Piano	Chamber Music	Duos for Other Instruments	1929		item in IBM catalog
175	Three Wishes or Inconstancy of the Life	Film-opera in 3 acts	Stage Works and Film Music	Operas	28 May 1929	1971	item in IBM catalog
175 A	The Departure	symphonic interlude from the 3rd act of the opera Three Wishes	Orchestral Music	Suites and Abstracts of the Incidental	15 May 1929		item in IBM catalog
175 B	Film Music	from the 3rd act of the opera Three Wishes	Stage Works and Film Music	Film Music	28 May 1929		item in IBM catalog
176	Blues		Works for Keyboards	Piano	1929	1930	item in IBM catalog
177	The Dance		Works for Keyboards	Piano	July 1929		item in IBM catalog
178	Prelude		Works for Keyboards	Piano	August 1929	1929	item in IBM catalog
179	Six Characters in Search of an Author	stage music to the play by Luigi Pirandello	Stage Works and Film Music	Incidental (Stage) Music	1929	1929	item in IBM catalog
180	Fantasia	for two pianos	Works for Keyboards	2 Pianos, Cembalo, Organ	September 1929	1937	item in IBM catalog
181	Eight Preludes	for piano	Works for Keyboards	Piano	1929		item in IBM catalog
181 A	Prelude in the Form of a Scherzo	for large orchestra	Orchestral Music	Works for Large Orchestra			item in IBM catalog
181bis	Tango and Allegretto	for piano	Works for Keyboards	Piano	1929		item in IBM catalog
182	Sonata No. 1	for violin and piano	Chamber Music	Duos for Violin and Piano	4 November 1929	1930	item in IBM catalog
183	String Quartet No. 3		Chamber Music	String Quartets	10 December 1929		item in IBM catalog
184	Five Short Pieces	for violin and piano	Chamber Music	Duos for Violin and Piano	14 April 1930	1930	item in IBM catalog
184bis	Three Christmas Songs		Vocal Music	Works for Solo Voice and Piano	December 1929		item in IBM catalog
185	With One Finger	piano piece for three hands	Works for Keyboards	Piano	26 January 1930		item in IBM catalog
186	Check to the King	jazz-ballet in 1 act	Stage Works and Film Music	Ballets	17 February 1930	1980	item in IBM catalog
186bis	Romance	for violin and piano	Chamber Music	Duos for Violin and Piano	May 1930	2022	item in IBM catalog
187	Wind Quintet	for flute, oboe, clarinet, bassoon and horn (lost)	All	All	1930		item in IBM catalog
188	Vocalise	étude for middle voice and piano	Vocal Music	Works for Solo Voice and Piano	7 November 1929		item in IBM catalog
188 A	Ariette	for violin and piano	Chamber Music	Duos for Violin and Piano	1930		item in IBM catalog
188 B	Ariette	for violoncello and piano	Chamber Music	Duos for Violoncello and Piano	1930		item in IBM catalog
189	Nocturnes	four études for violoncello and piano	Chamber Music	Duos for Violoncello and Piano	1931		item in IBM catalog
190	Pastorals	six pieces for violoncello and piano	Chamber Music	Duos for Violoncello and Piano	1931		item in IBM catalog
191	Easy Etudes for Two Violins		Chamber Music	Duos for Other Instruments	1930		item in IBM catalog
192	Miniature Suite	seven easy pieces for violoncello and piano	Chamber Music	Duos for Violoncello and Piano	14 December 1931		item in IBM catalog
193	Piano Trio No. 1 (Five short pieces)	for violin, violoncello and piano	Chamber Music	Trios with Piano	30 May 1930	1930	item in IBM catalog
194	The Day of Good Deeds	Opera in 3 acts	Stage Works and Film Music	Operas	April 1931	2003	item in IBM catalog
195	Borová	seven Czech dances	Works for Keyboards	Piano	September 1930		item in IBM catalog
195 A	Borová (Czech Dance No. 1)	for small orchestra	Orchestral Music	Works for Chamber or Small Orchestra	1931		item in IBM catalog
196 I	Concerto for Violoncello and Orchestra No. 1		Concertos	Violoncello Concertos	17 October 1930	1931	item in IBM catalog
196 II	Concerto for Violoncello and Orchestra No. 1		Concertos	Violoncello Concertos	1939		item in IBM catalog
196 III	Concerto for Violoncello and Orchestra No. 1		Concertos	Violoncello Concertos	July 1955	1955	item in IBM catalog
197	Three Songs after Poems by Guillaume Apollinaire		Vocal Music	Works for Solo Voice and Piano	1930	1931	item in IBM catalog
198	Sonatina for Two Violins and Piano		Chamber Music	Trios with Piano	1930		item in IBM catalog
199	Serenade	for chamber orchestra	Orchestral Music	Works for Chamber or Small Orchestra	13 December 1930	1931	item in IBM catalog
200	Les Rondes	Suite of dances for oboe, clarinet, bassoon, trumpet, piano and two violins	Chamber Music	Septets	23 November 1930	1932	item in IBM catalog
201	Seven Arabesques	rhythmic etudes for violoncello and piano	Chamber Music	Duos for Violoncello and Piano	1931		item in IBM catalog
201 A	Seven arabesques	rhythmic etudes for violin and piano	Chamber Music	Duos for Violin and Piano	1931		item in IBM catalog
202	Rhythmic Etudes	for violin and piano	Chamber Music	Duos for Violin and Piano	18 March 1932	1933	item in IBM catalog
202 A	Rhythmic Etudes	for string orchestra	Orchestral Music	Works for Chamber or Small Orchestra	1958	1958	item in IBM catalog
203	Sketches	first series	Works for Keyboards	Piano	1931		item in IBM catalog
204	Sketches	second series (lost)	Works for Keyboards	Piano	1931		item in IBM catalog
205	Games (Jeux)	first series	Works for Keyboards	Piano	1931	2003	item in IBM catalog
206	Games (Jeux)	six easy pieces for piano, second series	Works for Keyboards	Piano	1931		item in IBM catalog
207	Concerto for String Quartet and Orchestra		Concertos	Double, Triple and Quadruple Concertos	June 1931	1932	item in IBM catalog
208	Sonata No. 2	for violin and piano	Chamber Music	Duos for Violin and Piano	1931	1933	item in IBM catalog
209	Czech Nursery Rhymes	six female choruses	Vocal Music	Choir a Cappella	July 1931	1933	item in IBM catalog
210	Little Songs for Children		Vocal Music	Works for Solo Voice and Piano	1931		item in IBM catalog
211	Festive Ouverture for Sokol Gathering 1932	for large orchestra	Orchestral Music	Works for Large Orchestra	October 1931	1932	item in IBM catalog
212	Partita (Suite No. 1)	for string orchestra	Orchestral Music	Works for Chamber or Small Orchestra	7 November 1931	1932	item in IBM catalog
213	Sonata for Two Violins and Piano		Chamber Music	Trios with Piano	January 1932	1934	item in IBM catalog
213bis	Two Songs		Vocal Music	Works for Solo Voice and Piano	1932	1977	item in IBM catalog
214 A	First Orchestral Suite from the Ballet "Chap-Book"		Orchestral Music	Suites and Abstracts of the Incidental	17 May 1940		item in IBM catalog
214 B	Second Orchestral Suite from the Ballet "Chap-Book"		Orchestral Music	Suites and Abstracts of the Incidental	17 May 1940		item in IBM catalog
214 C	Two Dances from the Ballet "Chap-Book"		Works for Keyboards	Piano	1932		item in IBM catalog
214 I	The Chap-Book	ballet with singing in 3 acts	Stage Works and Film Music	Ballets	11 February 1932	1933	item in IBM catalog
214 I A	The Spectre's Bride		Vocal Music	Cantatas with Orchestra	11 February 1932		item in IBM catalog
214 II	The Chap-Book	ballet with singing in 3 acts	Stage Works and Film Music	Ballets	26 May 1940	1949	item in IBM catalog
215	Divertimento (Serenade No. 4)	for chamber orchestra	Orchestral Music	Works for Chamber or Small Orchestra	29 February 1932	1940	item in IBM catalog
216	Serenade No. 2	for two violins and viola	Chamber Music	Trios without Piano	March 1932	1939	item in IBM catalog
217	Serenade No. 1	for clarinet, French horn, three violins and viola	Chamber Music	Sextets	25 March 1932	1940	item in IBM catalog
218	Serenade No. 3	for oboe, clarinet, four violins and violoncello	Chamber Music	Septets	1 April 1932	1940	item in IBM catalog
219	Sinfonia Concertante	for two orchestras	Orchestral Music	Works for Large Orchestra	13 May 1932	1958	item in IBM catalog
220	Dance Sketches		Works for Keyboards	Piano	1932		item in IBM catalog
221	Children's Pieces		Works for Keyboards	Piano	1932		item in IBM catalog
222	Note into a Scrapbook	(No. 1)	Works for Keyboards	Piano	1932	1955	item in IBM catalog
223	Melo	music for the French film	Stage Works and Film Music	Film Music	1932	1932	item in IBM catalog
224	String Sextet	for two violins, two violas and two violoncellos	Chamber Music	Sextets	27 May 1932	1933	item in IBM catalog
224 A	String Sextet	arrangement for string orchestra	Orchestral Music	Works for Chamber or Small Orchestra		1951	item in IBM catalog
225	Four children's songs and rhymes		Vocal Music	Works for Solo Voice and Piano	1 June 1932		item in IBM catalog
226	Concerto for Violin and Orchestra No. 1		Concertos	Violin Concertos	February 1933	1973	item in IBM catalog
227	Ritornellos	six piano pieces	Works for Keyboards	Piano	15 December 1932	1935	item in IBM catalog
228	Two Ballads to Folk Poetry Lyrics	for alto and piano	Vocal Music	Works for Solo Voice and Piano	December 1932	1933	item in IBM catalog
229	Piano Quintet No. 1		Chamber Music	Quintets	16 March 1933	1934	item in IBM catalog
230	Easter Song		Vocal Music	Works for Solo Voice and Piano	April 1933	1956	item in IBM catalog
231	Concerto for Piano Trio and String Orchestra		Concertos	Double, Triple and Quadruple Concertos	April 1933	1963	item in IBM catalog
232	Concertino for Piano Trio and String Orchestra		Concertos	Double, Triple and Quadruple Concertos	31 August 1933	1936	item in IBM catalog
232bis	Two Songs to the Texts of Negro Folk-Poetry		Vocal Music	Works for Solo Voice and Piano	1932		item in IBM catalog
233	Marijka the Unfaithful	music for the film	Stage Works and Film Music	Film Music	December 1933	1934	item in IBM catalog
234	Inventions	for large orchestra	Orchestral Music	Works for Large Orchestra	January 1934	1934	item in IBM catalog
235	Four Songs About Mary	for mixed chorus	Vocal Music	Choir a Cappella	17 January 1934	1935	item in IBM catalog
236	The Plays of Mary		Stage Works and Film Music	Operas	26 June 1934	1935	item in IBM catalog
236/2 I	Mariken of Nimègue	first version of the 2nd act from the Miracles of Mary	Stage Works and Film Music	Operas	28 July 1933		item in IBM catalog
237	Concerto for Piano and Orchestra No. 2		Concertos	Piano Concertos	31 December 1934	1935	item in IBM catalog
238	String Trio No. 2	for violin, viola and violoncello	Chamber Music	Trios without Piano	28 August 1934	1935	item in IBM catalog
239	Lady's Shoe	music for a documentary and promotional film	Stage Works and Film Music	Film Music	1 March 1935		item in IBM catalog
240	City of the Water of Life: Mariánské Lázně	music for the documentary film	Stage Works and Film Music	Film Music	1935		item in IBM catalog
240 A	Interlude	from the film City of the Water of Life: Mariánské Lázně	Stage Works and Film Music	Film Music	1935		item in IBM catalog
241	Note into a Scrapbook	(No. 2)	Works for Keyboards	Piano	March 1935		item in IBM catalog
242	Composition for Little Evas		Works for Keyboards	Piano	February 1935		item in IBM catalog
243	The Voice of the Forest	radio-opera in 1 act	Stage Works and Film Music	Operas	5 May 1935	1935	item in IBM catalog
244	Two Pieces	for harpsichord	Works for Keyboards	2 Pianos, Cembalo, Organ	June 1935	1938	item in IBM catalog
245	The Judgement of Paris	ballet in 1 act (lost)	Stage Works and Film Music	Ballets	July 1935		item in IBM catalog
246	Concerto for Harpsichord and Small Orchestra		Concertos	Concertos for Other Solo Instruments and Orchestra	10 September 1935	1936	item in IBM catalog
247	Comedy on the Bridge	radio-opera in 1 act	Stage Works and Film Music	Operas	10 December 1935	1937	item in IBM catalog
247 A	Little Suite	from the Opera "Comedy on the Bridge"	Orchestral Music	Suites and Abstracts of the Incidental	1951		item in IBM catalog
248	Oidipus	stage music to the play by André Gide	Stage Works and Film Music	Incidental (Stage) Music	January 1936	1936	item in IBM catalog
248 A	Little Suite	from the stage music to Oidipus by André Gide	Orchestral Music	Suites and Abstracts of the Incidental	January 1936		item in IBM catalog
249	Dumka (No. 1)		Works for Keyboards	Piano	1936		item in IBM catalog
250	Dumka (No. 2)		Works for Keyboards	Piano	1936		item in IBM catalog
251	Theatre Behind the Gate	opera-ballet in 3 acts	Stage Works and Film Music	Operas	30 April 1936	1936	item in IBM catalog
251 A	Commedia dell'arte	Orchestral suite from the 1st act of the opera Theatre Behind the Gate	Orchestral Music	Suites and Abstracts of the Incidental	30 April 1936		item in IBM catalog
251bis	Let's repose		Vocal Music	Works for Solo Voice and Piano	1936		item in IBM catalog
252	Concerto for Flute, Violin and Orchestra		Concertos	Double, Triple and Quadruple Concertos	October 1936	1936	item in IBM catalog
253	Juliette (The Key to Dreams)	lyric opera in 3 acts	Stage Works and Film Music	Operas	24 January 1937	1938	item in IBM catalog
253 A	Three fragments from the opera Juliette		Orchestral Music	Suites and Abstracts of the Incidental	16 April 1939	2008	item in IBM catalog
253 B	Orchestral suite from the opera Juliette		Orchestral Music	Suites and Abstracts of the Incidental	24 January 1937		item in IBM catalog
253 C	Juliette (The Key to Dreams)	2nd act, 3rd scene	Works for Keyboards	Piano			item in IBM catalog
254	Sonata for Flute, Violin and Piano		Chamber Music	Trios with Piano	16 May 1937	1937	item in IBM catalog
255	Alexander Bis	opera buffa in 1 act	Stage Works and Film Music	Operas	8 March 1937	1964	item in IBM catalog
256	String Quartet No. 4		Chamber Music	String Quartets	May 1937	1938	item in IBM catalog
257	Crotchets and Quavers		Works for Keyboards	Piano	1937		item in IBM catalog
258	The Haunted Train		Works for Keyboards	Piano	15 September 1937		item in IBM catalog
259	Love Carol		Vocal Music	Works for Solo Voice and Piano	1937		item in IBM catalog
260	Bouquet of Flowers	a cycle of compositions to folk texts for mixed chorus (children's chorus), soli and small orchestra	Vocal Music	Cantatas with Orchestra	26 September 1937	1938	item in IBM catalog
261	Intermezzo	four pieces for violin and piano	Chamber Music	Duos for Violin and Piano	1937		item in IBM catalog
262	Sonatine for Violin and Piano		Chamber Music	Duos for Violin and Piano	1937		item in IBM catalog
263	Concerto Grosso	for chamber orchestra	Orchestral Music	Works for Chamber or Small Orchestra	3 November 1937	1941	item in IBM catalog
264	Duo Concertant	for Two Violins and Orchestra	Concertos	Double, Triple and Quadruple Concertos	December 1937	1938	item in IBM catalog
265	Trio for Flute, Violin and Bassoon	(lost)	Chamber Music	Trios without Piano	December 1937	1938	item in IBM catalog
266	Four Madrigals	for oboe, clarinet and bassoon	Chamber Music	Trios without Piano	1 January 1938		item in IBM catalog
267	Tre Ricercari	for chamber orchestra	Orchestral Music	Works for Chamber or Small Orchestra	23 February 1938	1938	item in IBM catalog
267bis (8bis)			Vocal Music	Works for Solo Voice and Piano			item in IBM catalog
268	String Quartet No. 5		Chamber Music	String Quartets	May 1938		item in IBM catalog
269	Concertino for Piano and Orchestra		Concertos	Piano Concertos	June 1938	1947	item in IBM catalog
270	Windows to the Garden	cycle of piano pieces	Works for Keyboards	Piano	August 1938		item in IBM catalog
271	Double Concerto	for two string orchestras, piano and timpani	Concertos	Piano Concertos	29 September 1938	1940	item in IBM catalog
272	Fairy-Tales	(lost)	Works for Keyboards	Piano	January 1939		item in IBM catalog
273	I Know a Grove	To Vitulka's Mother For Birthday	Vocal Music	Works for Solo Voice and Piano	June 1939		item in IBM catalog
274	Promenades	for Flute, Violin and Harpsichord	Chamber Music	Trios without Piano	February 1939		item in IBM catalog
275	Bergerettes	for Violin, Violoncello and Piano	Chamber Music	Trios with Piano	20 February 1939		item in IBM catalog
276 I	Suite Concertante for Violin and Orchestra		Concertos	Violin Concertos	1939	1943	item in IBM catalog
276 II	Suite Concertante for Violin and Orchestra		Concertos	Violin Concertos	15 February 1944	1945	item in IBM catalog
277	Sonata No. 1	for violoncello and piano	Chamber Music	Duos for Violoncello and Piano	12 May 1939	1940	item in IBM catalog
277bis	Czech Riddles		Vocal Music	Works for Solo Voice and Piano	25 May 1939		item in IBM catalog
278	Czech Madrigals	eight madrigals for mixed voices	Vocal Music	Choir a Cappella	July 1939	1965	item in IBM catalog
279	Field Mass	cantata for baritone, male chorus and orchestra	Vocal Music	Cantatas with Orchestra	December 1939	1946	item in IBM catalog
279bis	Wishes to Mamma		Vocal Music	Works for Solo Voice and Piano	24 December 1939	1939	item in IBM catalog
280	Military March	for orchestra	Orchestral Music	Works for Large Orchestra	1940		item in IBM catalog
281	Fantasy and Toccata	for piano	Works for Keyboards	Piano	September 1940	1943	item in IBM catalog
282	Sinfonietta Giocosa	for piano and small orchestra	Concertos	Piano Concertos	12 November 1940	1942	item in IBM catalog
282bis	Four Songs on Czech Folk Poetry	for voice and piano	Vocal Music	Works for Solo Voice and Piano	4 December 1940	1997	item in IBM catalog
283	Sonata da Camera	for violoncello and small orchestra	Concertos	Violoncello Concertos	30 December 1940	1943	item in IBM catalog
283bis	Rhymes and Songs on Lyrics of Czech Folk Poetry		Vocal Music	Works for Solo Voice and Piano	December 1940		item in IBM catalog
284	Mazurka	for piano	Works for Keyboards	Piano	April 1940		item in IBM catalog
285	Concerto da Camera	for Violin and String Orchestra with Piano and Percussion	Concertos	Violin Concertos	8 August 1941	1942	item in IBM catalog
285bis	Dumka No. 3		Works for Keyboards	Piano	21 September 1941		item in IBM catalog
286	Sonata No. 2	for violoncello and piano	Chamber Music	Duos for Violoncello and Piano	December 1941	1942	item in IBM catalog
286bis	A Merry Christmas 1941		Works for Keyboards	Piano	December 1941		item in IBM catalog
286ter	Birthday 1942		Works for Keyboards	Piano	January 1942		item in IBM catalog
287	Piano Quartet		Chamber Music	Quartets for Various Instruments	21 April 1942		item in IBM catalog
288	New Chap-Book	cycle of songs on Moravian folk poetry	Vocal Music	Works for Solo Voice and Piano	June 1942	1943	item in IBM catalog
289	Symphony No. 1		Orchestral Music	Symphonies	1 September 1942	1942	item in IBM catalog
290	Variations on a Theme of Rossini	for violoncello and piano	Chamber Music	Duos for Violoncello and Piano	October 1942	1943	item in IBM catalog
291	Madrigal-Sonata	for flute, violin and piano	Chamber Music	Trios with Piano	November 1942	1942	item in IBM catalog
292	Concerto for Two Pianos and Orchestra		Concertos	Double, Triple and Quadruple Concertos	23 February 1943	1943	item in IBM catalog
293	Concerto for Violin and Orchestra No. 2		Concertos	Violin Concertos	26 April 1943	1943	item in IBM catalog
294	Songs on One Page	cycle of songs on Moravian folk poetry for voice and piano	Vocal Music	Works for Solo Voice and Piano	March 1943		item in IBM catalog
295	Symphony No. 2		Orchestral Music	Symphonies	24 July 1943	1943	item in IBM catalog
296	Memorial to Lidice	for symphony orchestra	Orchestral Music	Works for Large Orchestra	3 August 1943	1943	item in IBM catalog
297	Five Madrigal Stanzas	for violin and piano	Chamber Music	Duos for Violin and Piano	November 1943		item in IBM catalog
298	Piano Quintet No. 2		Chamber Music	Quintets	14 April 1944	1944	item in IBM catalog
299	Symphony No. 3		Orchestral Music	Symphonies	14 June 1944	1945	item in IBM catalog
300	Trio for Flute, Violoncello and Piano		Chamber Music	Trios with Piano	31 July 1944	1945	item in IBM catalog
301	Fantasia	for theremin, oboe, piano and string quartet	Chamber Music	Septets	1 October 1944	1945	item in IBM catalog
302	Songs on Two Pages	cycle of songs on Moravian folk poetry for voice and piano	Vocal Music	Works for Solo Voice and Piano	October 1944	1946	item in IBM catalog
303	Sonata No. 3	for violin and piano	Chamber Music	Duos for Violin and Piano	4 December 1944	1945	item in IBM catalog
304	Concerto for violoncello and orchestra No. 2		Concertos	Violoncello Concertos	26 February 1945	1965	item in IBM catalog
304bis	Berceuse		Works for Keyboards	Piano	23 January 1945		item in IBM catalog
305	Symphony No. 4		Orchestral Music	Symphonies	14 June 1945	1945	item in IBM catalog
306	Sonata for Flute and Piano		Chamber Music	Duos for Other Instruments	3 July 1945	1949	item in IBM catalog
307	Czech Rhapsody	for violin and piano	Chamber Music	Duos for Violin and Piano	19 July 1945		item in IBM catalog
308	Etudes and Polkas	sixteen piano pieces in three books	Works for Keyboards	Piano	28 August 1945	1946	item in IBM catalog
309	Thunderbolt P-47	scherzo for orchestra	Orchestral Music	Works for Large Orchestra	15 September 1945	1945	item in IBM catalog
310	Symphony No. 5		Orchestral Music	Symphonies	13 May 1946	1947	item in IBM catalog
311	Toccata e due canzoni	for small orchestra	Orchestral Music	Works for Chamber or Small Orchestra	3 October 1946	1947	item in IBM catalog
312	String Quartet No. 6		Chamber Music	String Quartets	25 December 1946	1947	item in IBM catalog
313	Three Madrigals (Duo No. 1)	for violin and viola	Chamber Music	Duos for Other Instruments	17 March 1947	1947	item in IBM catalog
314	String Quartet No. 7 (Concerto da camera)		Chamber Music	String Quartets	24 June 1947	1949	item in IBM catalog
315	Quartet for Oboe, Violin, Violoncello and Piano		Chamber Music	Quartets for Various Instruments	21 October 1947	1949	item in IBM catalog
316	Concerto for Piano and Orchestra No. 3		Concertos	Piano Concertos	10 March 1948	1949	item in IBM catalog
317	The Strangler	A Rite of Passage	Stage Works and Film Music	Ballets	16 May 1948	1948	item in IBM catalog
318	The Fifth Day of the Fifth Moon		Works for Keyboards	Piano	20 May 1948		item in IBM catalog
319	The Bouquinistes from the Quai Malaquais		Works for Keyboards	Piano	24 May 1948		item in IBM catalog
320	Greeting to Sokols and Sokol Gathering	Festive fanfare for wind instruments	Orchestral Music	Works for Chamber or Small Orchestra	24 May 1948		item in IBM catalog
321	Five Czech Madrigals	for mixed voices	Vocal Music	Choir a Cappella	15 June 1948	1950	item in IBM catalog
322	Sinfonia Concertante	for oboe, basson, violin, violoncello and small orchestra	Concertos	Double, Triple and Quadruple Concertos	5 March 1949	1950	item in IBM catalog
323	Bagatelle	for piano	Works for Keyboards	Piano	March 1949		item in IBM catalog
324	Three Czech Dances	for two pianos	Works for Keyboards	2 Pianos, Cembalo, Organ	11 April 1949		item in IBM catalog
325	Mazurka - Nocturne	for oboe, two violins and violoncello	Chamber Music	Quartets for Various Instruments	August 1949	1949	item in IBM catalog
326	Barcarolle	for piano	Works for Keyboards	Piano	10 December 1949		item in IBM catalog
327	Piano Trio No. 2	for violin, violoncello and piano	Chamber Music	Trios with Piano	22 February 1950	1950	item in IBM catalog
328	Sinfonietta La Jolla	for chamber orchestra	Orchestral Music	Works for Chamber or Small Orchestra	21 March 1950	1950	item in IBM catalog
329	Concerto for Two Violins and Orchestra		Concertos	Double, Triple and Quadruple Concertos	10 June 1950	1951	item in IBM catalog
330	Intermezzo	for large orchestra	Orchestral Music	Works for Large Orchestra	September 1950	1950	item in IBM catalog
331	Duo No. 2	for violin and viola	Chamber Music	Duos for Other Instruments	13 October 1950	1951	item in IBM catalog
332	Piano Trio No. 3	for violin, violoncello and piano	Chamber Music	Trios with Piano	15 May 1951	1952	item in IBM catalog
333	Improvisation	for piano	Works for Keyboards	Piano	1951		item in IBM catalog
334	Serenade	for two clarinets, violin, viola and violoncello	Chamber Music	Quintets	11 November 1951	1952	item in IBM catalog
335	Stowe Pastorals	for five recorders, clarinet, two violins and violoncello	Chamber Music	Nonets	25 November 1951	1952	item in IBM catalog
336	What Men Live By	opera-pastoral in one act	Stage Works and Film Music	Operas	11 February 1952		item in IBM catalog
337	Rhapsody-Concerto	for viola and orchestra	Concertos	Concertos for Other Solo Instruments and Orchestra	18 April 1952	1953	item in IBM catalog
338	Three Part-Songs	for female voices	Vocal Music	Choir a Cappella	1952	1956	item in IBM catalog
339	Three Sacred Songs (Three Legends)	for female choir and violin	Vocal Music	Choir with Instrumental Accompaniment	1952	1956	item in IBM catalog
339 A	Virgin Mary Walked around the World		Vocal Music	Choir a Cappella	1952		item in IBM catalog
340	Sonata No. 3	for violoncello and piano	Chamber Music	Duos for Violoncello and Piano	5 October 1952	1953	item in IBM catalog
341	The Marriage	comic opera in two acts	Stage Works and Film Music	Operas	30 November 1952	1953	item in IBM catalog
342	Concerto for Violin, Piano and Orchestra		Concertos	Double, Triple and Quadruple Concertos	10 March 1953	1954	item in IBM catalog
343	Symphony No. 6 (Fantaisies Symphoniques)		Orchestral Music	Symphonies	26 May 1953	1955	item in IBM catalog
344	Accusation Against the Unknown	opera in three acts	Stage Works and Film Music	Operas		1980	item in IBM catalog
345	Overture	for orchestra	Orchestral Music	Works for Large Orchestra	15 November 1953		item in IBM catalog
346	Mirandolina	comic opera in three acts	Stage Works and Film Music	Operas	1 July 1954	1959	item in IBM catalog
346 A	Saltarello	from the opera Mirandolina	Orchestral Music	Suites and Abstracts of the Incidental	30 June 1954		item in IBM catalog
347	Hymn to St. James	for soli, mixed chorus, organ and instrumental accompaniment	Vocal Music	Cantatas without Instrumental Accompaniment or with Single Instruments	18 July 1954	1955	item in IBM catalog
348	Primrose	duets after lyrics of Moravian folk poetry	Vocal Music	Choir with Instrumental Accompaniment	5 August 1954	1955	item in IBM catalog
349	Mount of Three Lights	for male choir and organ	Vocal Music	Cantatas without Instrumental Accompaniment or with Single Instruments	25 November 1954	1955	item in IBM catalog
350	Sonata for Piano		Works for Keyboards	Piano	17 December 1954	1957	item in IBM catalog
351	The Epic of Gilgamesh	oratorio for soli, mixed choir and orchestra	Vocal Music	Oratorio	16 February 1955	1958	item in IBM catalog
352	The Frescoes of Piero della Francesca	for large orchestra	Orchestral Music	Works for Large Orchestra	13 April 1955	1956	item in IBM catalog
353	Concerto for Oboe and Small Orchestra		Concertos	Concertos for Other Solo Instruments and Orchestra	12 May 1955	1956	item in IBM catalog
354	The Opening of the Springs / The Opening of the Wells	cantata for soli, female chorus and instrumental accompaniment	Vocal Music	Cantatas without Instrumental Accompaniment or with Single Instruments	July 1955	1955	item in IBM catalog
355	Sonata for Viola and Piano		Chamber Music	Duos for Other Instruments	16 December 1955	1956	item in IBM catalog
356	Sonatina for Clarinet and Piano		Chamber Music	Duos for Other Instruments	20 January 1956		item in IBM catalog
357	Sonatina for Trumpet and Piano		Chamber Music	Duos for Other Instruments	2 February 1956		item in IBM catalog
358	Concerto for Piano and Orchestra No. 4 (Incantation)		Concertos	Piano Concertos	6 February 1956	1956	item in IBM catalog
359	Impromptu	for Two Pianos	Works for Keyboards	2 Pianos, Cembalo, Organ	June 1956	1990	item in IBM catalog
360	The Legend of the Smoke from Potato Tops	cantata for soli, mixed choir and instrumental accompaniment	Vocal Music	Cantatas without Instrumental Accompaniment or with Single Instruments	14 October 1956	1957	item in IBM catalog
361	Brigand Songs	ten male choruses	Vocal Music	Choir a Cappella	20 January 1957	1957	item in IBM catalog
362	Adagio (Memories)		Works for Keyboards	Piano	March 1957		item in IBM catalog
363	The Rock	symphonic prelude for large orchestra	Orchestral Music	Works for Large Orchestra	April 1957	1958	item in IBM catalog
364	The Romance from the Dandelions	cantata for mixed choir and soprano solo	Vocal Music	Cantatas without Instrumental Accompaniment or with Single Instruments	18 May 1957	1958	item in IBM catalog
365	Divertimento	for two recorders	Chamber Music	Duos for Other Instruments	24 May 1957		item in IBM catalog
366	Concerto for Piano and Orchestra No. 5 (Fantasia concertante)	in B♭ major	Concertos	Piano Concertos	3 January 1958	1959	item in IBM catalog
367	The Parables	for large orchestra	Orchestral Music	Works for Large Orchestra	9 February 1958	1959	item in IBM catalog
368	Sonata for Harpsichord		Works for Keyboards	2 Pianos, Cembalo, Organ	March 1958		item in IBM catalog
369	Estampes	for orchestra	Orchestral Music	Works for Large Orchestra	2 April 1958	1959	item in IBM catalog
370	Ariadne	lyric opera in 1 act	Stage Works and Film Music	Operas	15 June 1958	1961	item in IBM catalog
371	Duo for Violin and Violoncello No. 2		Chamber Music	Duos for Other Instruments	1 July 1958	1962	item in IBM catalog
372 I	The Greek Passion	opera in 4 acts - 1st version	Stage Works and Film Music	Operas	January 1957	1999	item in IBM catalog
372 II	The Greek Passion	opera in 4 acts - 2nd version	Stage Works and Film Music	Operas	15 January 1959	1961	item in IBM catalog
373	Songs for a Children's Choir		Vocal Music	Choir a Cappella	3 February 1959	1960	item in IBM catalog
374	Nonet No. 2	for flute, oboe, clarinet, bassoon, French horn, violin, viola, violoncello and double bass	Chamber Music	Nonets	1 February 1959	1959	item in IBM catalog
375	Mikesh from the Mountains	cantata for soli, mixed choir and instrumental accompaniment	Vocal Music	Cantatas without Instrumental Accompaniment or with Single Instruments	13 February 1959	1959	item in IBM catalog
376	Chamber Music No. 1	for clarinet, violin, viola, violoncello, harp and piano	Chamber Music	Sextets	3 March 1959	1959	item in IBM catalog
377	Two Pieces for Two Violoncellos		Chamber Music	Duos for Other Instruments	March 1959		item in IBM catalog
378	Variations on a Slovak Folk Song	for violoncello and piano	Chamber Music	Duos for Violoncello and Piano	12 March 1959	1959	item in IBM catalog
379	The Bird Feast		Vocal Music	Choir with Instrumental Accompaniment	19 March 1959	1960	item in IBM catalog
380	Madrigals (Part-Song Book)	four madrigals for mixed choir	Vocal Music	Choir a Cappella	20 March 1959	1959	item in IBM catalog
381	Two Impromptus	for harpsichord	Works for Keyboards	2 Pianos, Cembalo, Organ	21 March 1959		item in IBM catalog
382	Vigil	for organ	Works for Keyboards	2 Pianos, Cembalo, Organ	April 1959		item in IBM catalog
383	The Prophecy of Isaiah	cantata for soli, male choir and instrumental accompaniment	Vocal Music	Cantatas without Instrumental Accompaniment or with Single Instruments	6 May 1959		item in IBM catalog
383 A	The Burden of Moab	incomplete draft of a cantata	Vocal Music	Cantatas with Orchestra	July 1959		item in IBM catalog
384	Greeting	for children's choir	Vocal Music	Choir a Cappella	16 July 1959		item in IBM catalog

== See also ==
- Bohuslav Martinů Complete Edition
