= Symphony No. 2 (Martinů) =

- by Bohuslav Martinů
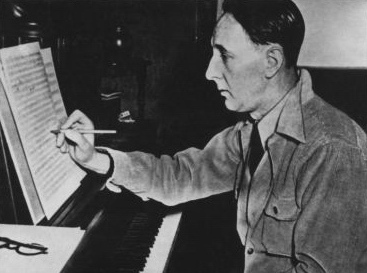
- Martinů in 1942, working on the symphony
- Catalogue: H. 295
- Composed: 1943

Premiere
- Date: 28 October 1943
- Conductor: Erich Leinsdorf
- Performers: Cleveland Orchestra

Bohuslav Martinů's Symphony No. 2, H. 295, was composed from May 29 to July 24, 1943 under a commission from the Czech community in Cleveland. It was premiered by the Cleveland Orchestra conducted by Erich Leinsdorf on October 28 that year, which marked the 25th anniversary of the foundation of Czechoslovakia, then downgraded to a Czech protectorate and Slovak puppet state under German occupation.

The work, which has been linked with Antonín Dvořák's 1889 Symphony No. 8 due to its innocently pastoral character, is the shortest of Martinů's six symphonies, lasting ca. 24 minutes, and the only one that ends in its original tonality, D. It consists of a flowing Allegro, a serene Andante, a martial scherzo, and a bright finale.

1. Allegro moderato
2. Andante moderato
3. Poco allegro
4. Allegro

Although the quiet theme opening the Allegro moderato seems to promise a sonata form, Martinů dispenses with both a second theme and the expected development section. The Andante is the most successful and least ambitious slow movement in all of Martinů's symphonies. It is even more nostalgic in character than is ever found in Dvořák, expressed by phrases of a folk-like simplicity exchanged between woodwinds and strings.

== Instrumentation ==
The Second Symphony is scored for two flutes, piccolo, three oboes, three clarinets, two bassoons, four horns, three trumpets, three trombones, tuba, timpani, percussion (triangle, side drum, bass drum, cymbal, tam-tam), harp, piano, and strings.

== Recordings ==
- Bohuslav Martinů: Symphony No. 2; Fantaisies symphoniques (Symphony No. 6). Czech Philharmonic Orchestra; Václav Neumann, cond. Recorded at the Supraphon Studio, House of Artists, Prague, 17, 20, and 22 March 1977 (Symphony No. 2) and 9–14 January 1976 (Symphony No 6). LP recording, quadraphonic. Supraphon 1410 2096. Prague: Supraphon, 1977. Reissued on LP, quadraphonic. Pro Arte PAL-1019. Cassette, stereo. Pro Arte PAC-1019. CD, stereo. Pro Arte/Supraphon PAL-1019. Minneapolis: Pro Arte Records, 1981. Symphony No. 2 reissued in stereo on CD, together with Martinů's Symphony No. 1, on Supraphon 11 1966-2 011. Czech Republic: Supraphon, 1994.
- USSR Ministry of Culture Symphony — Gennady Rozhdestvensky. Yedang, 1985.
- Bamberg Symphony — Neeme Järvi. BIS, 1987.
- Bohuslav Martinů: Symphony No. 1; Symphony No. 2. Berliner Sinfonie-Orchester (DDR), Claus Peter Flor, cond. Recorded 21–24 February (No. 1) and 29–30 May (No. 2), 1989, at Christus Church, Berlin, DDR. BMG Classics. CD recording, stereo. RCA Victor RD 60154. Cassette tape, stereo. RCA Victor Red Seal 60154-4-RC. [N.p.]: RCA Victor Red Seal, 1990.
- Bohuslav Martinů Symphony No. 2; Symphony no. 6 (Fantaisies symphoniques). Scottish National Orchestra, Bryden Thomson, cond. Recorded in the Henry Wood Hall, Glasgow, 20–21 August 1990. CD, stereo. CHAN 8916; Chandos; Cassette, stereo. ABTD 1524. Colchester, Essex, England: Chandos, 1991.
- Ukrainian National Symphony — Arthur Fagen. Naxos, 2001.
- Antonín Dvořák: Symphony No. 9 in E minor "From the New World". Bohuslav Martinů: Symphony No. 2. Cincinnati Symphony Orchestra, Paavo Järvi, cond. SACD recording, stereo. Telarc 60616. [Cleveland]: Telarc International Corporation, 2005.
- Bohuslav Martinů: Symphonies Nos. 1–6. Prague Radio Symphony Orchestra, Vladimír Válek, cond. Recorded Prague, Czech Radio, Studio A, 2006. 3-CD set. Supraphon SU 3940. Prague: Supraphon, 2008.
- Martinů: The 6 Symphonies. BBC Symphony Orchestra, Jiří Bělohlávek. Recorded live at the Barbican Hall, London, 3 October (No. 1) and 9 October (No. 2), 2009; 19 February (No. 4), 19 March (No. 5), 17 April (No. 3), and 8 May (No. 6), 2010. 3-CD set. Onyx 4061. [London]: Onyx Classics, 2011.
