= Symphony No. 5 (Martinů) =

1946 symphony by Bohuslav Martinů

- by Bohuslav Martinů
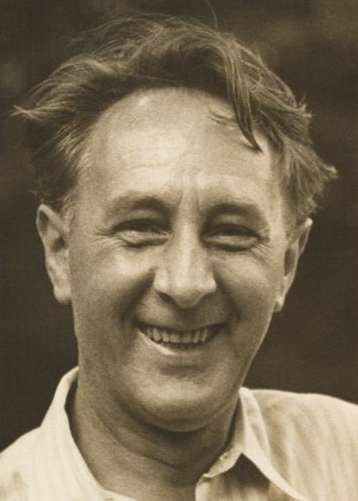
- Martinů c. 1942
- Catalogue: H. 310
- Composed: 1946
- Dedication: Czech Philharmonic
- Movements: 3

Premiere
- Date: 28 May 1947
- Location: Prague Spring Festival
- Conductor: Rafael Kubelik
- Performers: Czech Philharmonic

The Symphony No. 5, H. 310, is an orchestral composition by the Czech composer Bohuslav Martinů.

== History ==
The Fifth Symphony was composed from March to May 1946. Although Martinů initially spoke of dedicating it to the Red Cross, in the end the score was dedicated to the Czech Philharmonic, perhaps in anticipation of a return to his native land. Although this repatriation did not come about, the Fifth nevertheless is the only one of Martinů’s symphonies to have been premiered by a Czech orchestra: Rafael Kubelik conducted the Czech Philharmonic in the first performance, at the Prague Spring Festival on 28 May 1947.

== Instrumentation ==
The Fifth Symphony is scored for two flutes, piccolo, three oboes, three clarinets, three bassoons, four horns, three trumpets, three trombones, tuba, timpani, percussion (cymbals, tam-tam, triangle, bass drum, side drum), piano, and strings.

== Analysis ==
The symphony is in three movements:

1. Adagio — Allegro
2. Larghetto
3. Lento — Allegro

The general plan of the symphony does not adhere to the traditional form. Instead, Martinů said, it has a "more modern, better structure". This involves the alternation of slow and fast sections in all of the movements, and the symphony's most distinctive feature is its enlivenment by rhythmic devices. Like the Sixth Symphony but unlike all the earlier ones, the first movement of the Fifth Symphony begins with a slow introduction that returns as a postlude at the end, creating a frame around the main structure. In this case, however, the adagio also is found in the middle of the movement as an interlude, where it is followed by a combination of recapitulation and new development.

The finale closes with a long passage in the minor mode, unlike any of the other five Martinů symphonies.

== Discography ==
The 1955 monaural recording of the Fifth by Karel Ančerl was the first of Martinů's symphonies to be released commercially on LP. Ančerl recorded a stereophonic version for Canadian radio in 1972 (also released on LP), and a new studio recording in quadraphonic sound in 1977 was conducted by Václav Neumann as part of a complete traversal of the six Martinů symphonies.

- Bohuslav Martinů: Symphony No. 5. Czech Philharmonic, Karel Ančerl, cond. Recorded in Dvořák Hall, Prague, 21–23 March 1955. 10-inch LP, monaural. Supraphon DM 5599. Prague: Supraphon, 1955. Reissued, 10-inch LP, Supraphon SUF 20035. Reissued in simulated stereo, 12-inch LP (with Martinů: Field Mass), Everest SDBR 3329. Los Angeles: Everest Records. Symphony reissued on CD (with Martinů: Memorial to Lidice, Les Fresques de Piero della Francesca, and The Parables). Supraphon 11 1931-2. Prague: Supraphon, 1992. Symphony reissued again on CD (with Martinů: Symphony No. 6 and Memorial to Lidice) on Karel Ančerl Gold Edition, vol. 34. Supraphon SU 3694-2. Prague: Supraphon, 2004.
- Bohuslav Martinů: Symphony No. 5. Ottorino Respighi: Fountains of Rome. Toronto Symphony Orchestra, Karel Ančerl, cond. (Martinů); Kazuyoshi Akiyama, cond. (Respighi). Recorded November 1971 and January 1972, Massey Hall, Toronto. LP recording, stereo. CBC Radio Canada SM 218. Toronto: CBC Radio Canada Broadcast Recordings, 1972.
- Bohuslav Martinů: Symphony No. 3; Symphony No. 4; Symphony No. 5. Czech Philharmonic, Václav Neumann, cond. 2-LP set, quadraphonic. Supraphon 1410 2771/2. Prague: Supraphon, 1979. Reissued on CD, Martinů: Symphony No. 5; Fantaisies symphoniques (Symphony No. 6). CD recording, stereo. Supraphon 111968. [Prague]: Supraphon, 1995. Reissued as part of Martinů Symphonies. 3-CD set, stereo. Supraphon 110382. [Prague]: Supraphon, 1994.
- Bohuslav Martinů: Symphonies Nos. 5 and 6. Bamberg Symphony Orchestra, Neeme Järvi, cond. CD recording, stereo. Recorded in the Dominikanerbau, Bamberg, Germany, March 1988. Bis 402. [Sweden]: Bis Records, 1993. Reissued as part of Bohuslav Martinů: The Symphonies. 3-CD set, stereo. Bis 1371/2. [Sweden]: Bis, 2003. Reissued, 3-CD set. Brilliant Classics 8950. [N.p.]: Brilliant Classics, 2008.
- Bohuslav Martinů: Symphony No. 1; Symphony No. 5. Scottish National Orchestra, Bryden Thomson, cond. Recorded 17 and 19 April 1990, in the Caird Hall, Dundee. CD recording, stereo. Chandos CHAN 8915. Cassette tape, stereo. Chandos ABTD 1523. Colchester, Essex, England: Chandos, 1991.
- Bohuslav Martinů: Symphonies No. 3 and 5. National Symphony Orchestra of Ukraine, Arthur Fagen, cond. Recorded at the National Radio Company of Ukraine, Kyiv, March 1995. CD recording, stereo, Naxos 8553350. Hong Kong: Naxos Records, 2002.
- Bohuslav Martinů: Symphonies Nos. 1–6. Prague Radio Symphony Orchestra, Vladimír Válek, cond. Recorded Prague, Czech Radio, Studio A, 2006. 3-CD set. Supraphon SU 3940. Prague: Supraphon, 2008.
- Martinů: The 6 Symphonies. BBC Symphony Orchestra, Jiří Bělohlávek. Recorded live at the Barbican Hall, London, 3 October 3 (No. 1) and 9 October (No. 2), 2009; 19 February (No. 4), 19 March (No. 5), 17 April 17 (No. 3), and 8 May (No. 6), 2010. 3-CD set. Onyx 4061. [London]: Onyx Classics, 2011.
