= Piano Sonata (Martinů) =

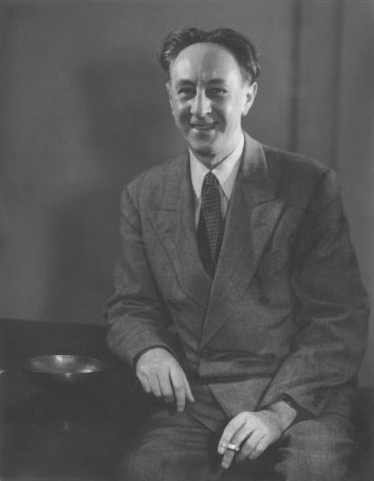
Bohuslav Martinů in 1945

Bohuslav Martinů's Piano Sonata, H. 350 was written in Nice in the last months of 1954 for Rudolf Serkin, who premiered it in Düsseldorf in 1957 coupled with Ludwig van Beethoven's Sonata No. 29. The first performance in the Eastern Bloc took place in Brno later that year, by Eliška Nováková.

Framed by the Symphony No. 6 and the Piano Concerto No. 4, it is Martinů's largest solo piano work and a significant work of his late period, characterized by formal freedom, dramatic tension, harsh dissonant harmonies and changing rhythms. It consists of three movements:

1. Poco allegro
2. Moderato
3. Adagio - Poco allegro

== See also ==
- List of compositions by Bohuslav Martinů
