= H number =

H number or H-number may refer to:

- H-number (photography), an aperture setting used on Rodenstock Tiefenbildner Imagon lenses
- H number (musical catalogue), a number associated with musical catalogues by Harry Halbreich
- h-index, an index that attempts to measure productivity and citation impact of the published body of work of a scientist or scholar
- Herfindahl index, a measure of size of firms in relation to the industry and an indicator of the amount of competition among them
