= Concerto for Double String Orchestra =

Concerto for Double String Orchestra may refer to:

- Concerto for Double String Orchestra (Tippett), by Michael Tippett
- Double Concerto for Two String Orchestras, Piano, and Timpani (Martinů), by Bohuslav Martinů
- Partita for Double String Orchestra, by Ralph Vaughan Williams
