= Violin Concerto No. 2 in G minor =

Violin Concerto No. 2 in G minor can refer to:

- Antonio Vivaldi's Violin Concerto No. 2, in G Minor, Op. 8, Summer (L'estate) from The Four Seasons (Vivaldi).
- Sergei Prokofiev's 1935 Violin Concerto No. 2 (Prokofiev) in G Minor, Opus 65.
- Bohuslav Martinů's 1943 Violin Concerto No. 2 (Martinů) in G Minor, H. 293.
