= Fredrik Fors =

Swedish classical music clarinetist

Fredrik Fors (born 1973, in Borlänge) is a Swedish, classical music clarinetist. His album in the Juventus Les Nouveaux Musiciens series has been described as "one of the finest recitals of its kind".

== Early studies and career ==
Fredrik Fors began playing clarinet at the age of 10 in the music school of his native town. At 15 he made his debut as soloist in the Clarinet Concerto No. 2 in F minor, Op. 5, by Bernhard Crusell with the Helsingborg Symphony Orchestra. Swedish Television made a much acclaimed documentary about Fors at the time of his debut. By 1990 he had played the Jean Françaix Clarinet Concerto with the Austrian Radio Orchestra. In 1993 he received the Juventus Prize awarded by the Council of Europe and Foundation Claude-Nicolas Ledoux. He pursued further studies on clarinet with Sölve Kingstedt at the Royal College of Music, Stockholm, receiving his Soloist's Diploma in 1996, and later had lessons or master classes with such well-known clarinetists as Karl Leister, Yehuda Gilad, Antony Pay, Richard Stoltzman, and Kalmen Opperman. He became a member of the Oslo Philharmonic under Mariss Jansons in 1995 and is currently (2009) Co-Principal.

== Career as a soloist ==
Although Fors is particularly associated with the Françaix Clarinet Concerto, he has also performed the Copland, Mozart, Nielsen, and Weber concertos. He also gave the Scandinavian premiere and has had great success with the John Corigliano Clarinet Concerto.

== Career as a chamber musician ==
Fors has had an active career as a chamber musician. He is a member of the Oslo Philharmonic Wind Soloists and joined the Bergen Woodwind Quintet in the autumn of 2006. He has appeared in festivals such as the BBC Proms, the St. Magnus Festival (Orkney), and the Juventus Festival (France), as well as numerous festivals in Scandinavia, including Musik vid Siljan and the Saxå Kammarmusik Festival in Sweden, and, in Norway, the Hardanger Musikkfest, Vinterfestspill på Røros, Glogerfestdagarne, the Ultima Festival (in Oslo), and the Risør Chamber Music Festival (Artistic Director: Leif Ove Andsnes). He also appeared in concerts at the Théâtre de la Ville in Paris in 1995 and 1999.

== Audio recording ==
Les nouveaux musiciens • Fredrik Fors, clarinet • Sveinung Bjelland, piano

- Includes:
  - Debussy: Première Rhapsodie (1910)
  - Debussy: Petite pièce (1910)
  - Martinů: Sonatine pour clarinet et piano (1956) H. 356
  - Berg: Vier Stücke für Klarinette und Klavier, Op. 5 (1913)
  - Busoni: Elégie pour clarinet et piano (1920) BV 286
  - Busoni: Suite pour clarinet et piano, Op. 10 (1878) BV 88
  - Poulenc: Sonate pour clarinet et piano (1962)
- Label: Harmonia Mundi HMN911853 (1 CD, 63 min) Released 8 February 2005.
- Recording location and date: Teldex Studio Berlin, February 2004.
- Note: The American Record Guide praised this CD as "one of the finest recitals of its kind."
