= Sveinung Bjelland =

Norwegian classical pianist

Sveinung Bjelland (born 1970) is a Norwegian classical pianist who has made an international career as a soloist and Lieder accompanist. He also holds a piano professorship at the Academy of Music in Oslo, Norway.

== Career ==
Born in Stavanger, Bjelland studied piano with Hans Leygraf at the Mozarteum in Salzburg and at the Hochschule der Künste in Berlin, where he completed his studies with distinction. In 1999, he was called "Young Soloist of the Year" by the Concerts Norway.

Bjelland has collaborated with notable orchestras and conductors. He accompanied the Norwegian singer Isa Katharina Gericke in several Lieder recordings. His recording of piano sonatas by Mendelssohn and Scarlatti was nominated for the award Spellemannprisen. In 2005, a CD was released with music for clarinet and piano, played by clarinetist Fredrik Fors and him, including Poulenc's Clarinet Sonata, Martinu's Clarinet Sonatina and music by Busoni, Debussy and Alban Berg. Bjelland made his debut at London's Wigmore Hall in October 2008. In collaboration with tenor Daniel Behle, he has released a recording of Schubert's Die schöne Müllerin in 2010, and of Schumann's Dichterliebe in 2011.

On 1 July 2014, Bjelland was appointed professor of piano at the University of Agder in Kristiansand.
