= Comedy on the Bridge =

Radio opera by Bohuslav Martinů

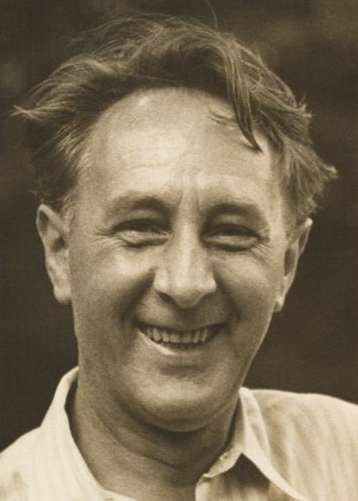
Bohuslav Martinů in c. 1942

Veselohra na mostě (Comedy on the Bridge) is a radio opera in one act by Bohuslav Martinů to a Czech libretto by the composer, based on the comedy by Václav Kliment Klicpera and composed in 1935 in Polička. It has later been staged successfully, in America and Czechoslovakia.

The composer at this time in his career was able to explore the possibilities of new media for opera in two works composed in 1935 in response to commissions from Czechoslovak Radio: Hlas lesa (The Voice of the Forest), and Veselohra na mostě (Comedy on the Bridge). The latter's "simplicity of means and effective characterization fulfil perfectly the requirements for radio opera".

== Performance history ==
The first performance was a broadcast by Czech Radio, Prague on 18 March 1937. The first staged performance was at Hunter College, New York City on 28 May 1951, which the composer attended, where the work received an award for "best new opera" from the New York Music Critics Circle.

The opera has received two productions at the National Theatre in Prague, in 1961 and 1975.

Martinů arranged three sections of the opera (the instrumental opening, the song of Popelka, and the finale) into a "Little Suite" for chamber orchestra, including piano.

== Roles ==
Role	Voice type	Premiere Cast, 18 March 1937 (Conductor: Otakar Jeremias)
Popelka, the village beauty	soprano	
Sykos, a fisherman, Josephine's fiancé	baritone	
Bedron, a brewer	bass	
Eva, Bedron's wife	contralto	
Schoolmaster	tenor	
Friendly sentry	spoken	
Enemy sentry	spoken	
Friendly officer	spoken	

== Synopsis ==
The setting is on a bridge over a river, during the first half of the 19th century. The river separates two opposing armies during an unspecified conflict. Josephine Popelka has earlier been to the battlefield and buried her brother. On her return, the enemy sentry lets her pass, but holds her papers from his commanding officer. Without the proper papers, the sentry on her own side denies her request to pass, and Josephine must remain on the bridge.

At the same time, Bedron, the village brewer, is allowed on to the bridge from his own side, but is prevented from crossing over at the other side. With Josephine and Bedron detained on the bridge, Bedron casually makes a pass at Josephine. Josephine's fiancé Johnny then appears, and accuses her of being unfaithful. Eva, Bedron's wife, in turn arrives and she joins the argument.

The schoolmaster then joins the scene, trying to solve a riddle that he heard from Colonel Ladinsky, an officer on his own side: 'a deer is in a field, surrounded by a wall too high and steep to jump or climb. How does the deer escape?' The riddle parallels the characters' situation. Then, offstage, battle sounds are heard. The two couples settle their differences peaceably. Then they hear news of battlefield victory on their side. Colonel Ladinsky appears and tells Josephine her brother is alive; it turns out that she buried another deceased soldier. The colonel also reveals the answer to the riddle: the deer does not escape. Everyone laughs and celebrates the victory.

== Recordings ==
- 1963 - in French - featuring Nadine Sautereau, Jane Berbié, Jacques Mars, Bernard Demigny, Jean Giraudeau, Gérard Friedmann, with the Orchestre Lyrique de l'ORTF conducted by Manuel Rosenthal Le Chant du Monde
- 1984 - in Czech with Alexandre bis Jarmila Krátká, Anna Barová, Vladimir Krejčik, René Tuček, Richard Novák, Brno Janáček Chamber Opera Orchestra conducted by František Jílek. 1CD Supraphon
- 2022 - with Les Larmes du Couteau Elena Tsallagova, Maria Riccarda Wesseling, Adam Palka, Esther Dierkes, Stine Marie Fischer, Björn Bürger, Andrew Bogard, Michael Smallwood, Staatsorchester Stuttgart, Cornelius Meister. 1CD Capriccio
