= The Frescoes of Piero della Francesca =

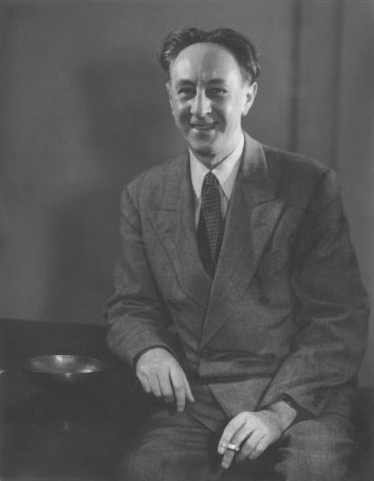
Bohuslav Martinů in 1945

The Frescoes of Piero della Francesca (Les Fresques de Piero della Francesca), H. 352, is an orchestral work by Bohuslav Martinů.

It pays homage to the cycle of frescoes The History of the True Cross by Piero della Francesca, which Bohuslav Martinů had admired at Arezzo in 1954. He was inspired particularly by The Meeting of Solomon and the Queen of Sheba and by Constantine's Dream.

Martinů composed the work in Nice in 1955, and it was first performed in Salzburg by the Vienna Philharmonic Orchestra conducted by Rafael Kubelik on 26 August 1956. The work is dedicated to Kubelik.

The work has three movements:

1. Andante poco moderato
2. Adagio
3. Poco allegro

== Selected recordings ==
- Royal Philharmonic Orchestra conducted by Rafael Kubelik in 1958 (EMI).
- Orchestre de la Suisse Romande conducted by Ernest Ansermet (Cascavelle).
- Prague Radio Symphony Orchestra conducted by Charles Mackerras in 1982 (Supraphon) available to hear on Youtube
- Orchestre National de France conducted by James Conlon in 1991 (Erato).
- Prague Radio Symphony Orchestra conducted by Vladimír Válek in 1993 (Praga).
- BBC Symphony Orchestra conducted by Andrew Davis (Warner).

== Video showing music and frescoes ==
For the Martinů Festival in Basel/Switzerland 2010 the Swiss author Arthur Spirk presented a video using the CD-Music by the Orchestre National de France conducted by James Conlon in 1991 (see above) and detailed photographs of the frescoes.

== Note ==
The initial version of this article was based on a translation of the article on the work in the French Wikipedia.
