= Clarinet Sonatina (Martinů) =

1956 musical composition by Bohuslav Martinů

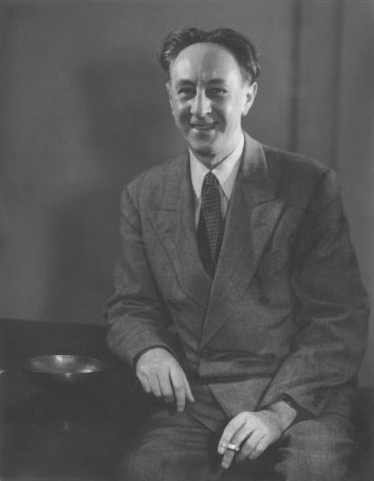
Bohuslav Martinů in 1945

The Sonatina for Clarinet and Piano (H. 356) by the Czech composer Bohuslav Martinů is a late work that was composed in 1956 while Martinů was living in New York. The sonatina is played as a single movement but consists of three well defined sections:

- Moderato
- Andante
- Poco allegro

== Style ==
The Sonatina reveals the influence of the neoclassicism of Francis Poulenc and Igor Stravinsky and the "rich palette of tone-colours" of Claude Debussy. It is filled with dance (polka) and march rhythms and virtuosic runs. Passages of a cheerful nature containing unexpected syncopations alternate with more earnest lyrical ones. In this music can be seen the composer's nostalgia for the happier, more productive time he had spent in Paris (1923–1940), years filled with spirited interactions with the group of "Les Six." Notwithstanding its elegance and finish, the music also embraces the passionate strength of his Czech roots.

== Published scores ==
- Sonatina pour Clarinette Si ♭ et Piano. Éditions Alphonse Leduc, AL 21 698.
- Sonatina per clarinetto e pianoforte. Partitura e parte. Editio Supraphon, H 7479.

== Recording ==
- Fredrik Fors, clarinet; Sveinung Bjelland, piano (Harmonia Mundi HMN911853; see recording details at Fredrik Fors).
