= Flute Sonata (Martinů) =

1945 musical composition by Bohuslav Martinů

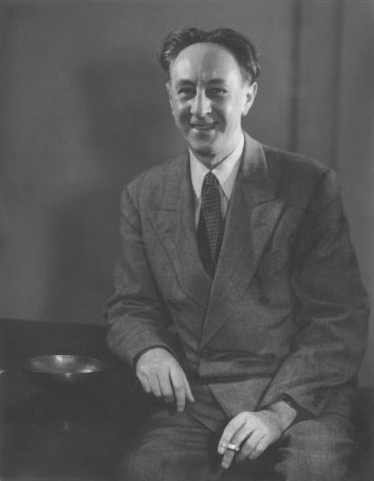
Bohuslav Martinů in 1945

Bohuslav Martinů's Sonata for Flute and Piano, H. 306, was composed in 1945 in South Orleans, Cape Cod, during the composer's five years in the USA following his escape from occupied France. The work was composed for George Laurent who was the principal flute of the Boston Symphony Orchestra from 1918 to 1952. It was premiered on 18 December 1949 in New York, with Elaine Schaffer as soloist. Although Martinu originally entitled the work as his 'First Sonata for Flute and Piano', no Second Sonata ever appeared.

== Movements ==
The sonata is composed in three movements:

1. Allegro moderato
2. Adagio
3. Allegro poco moderato

== Description ==
The outer movements are notably rhythmic, with the intervening adagio movement more melancholy and lyrical in nature. The inspiration for the theme of the third movement draws from Martinů's experience nursing an injured whippoorwill back to health in Cape Cod. The bird's song is recalled in the music.
