= Evelyn Barbirolli =

British musician

Evelyn, Lady Barbirolli OBE (24 January 1911 – 25 January 2008) was an English oboist, and the wife of the eminent conductor Sir John Barbirolli.

She was born Evelyn Rothwell, and was known professionally by that name until after she was widowed, when she became known as Evelyn Barbirolli. She rose to fame at a time when there were very few women in orchestras except for harpists.

== Early years ==
Evelyn Rothwell was born 24 January 1911 in Wallingford-on-Thames, Berkshire, the daughter of a tea dealer in the City of London. Her mother was related to Charles Reade, a novelist of the Victorian era. She did not take up the oboe until she was 17, when she started to learn at her school, Downe House, near Newbury, under the headship of Olive Willis. Her father was not supportive of her studying music, but her mother encouraged her to enter the Royal College of Music. She studied the oboe there with Léon Goossens. She also learned the piano as a second instrument, and played the cello and the timpani. Benjamin Britten, nearly three years younger, was also a student there and he got her to play through some of his compositions for oboe.

She started her professional career by deputising for Léon Goossens in the Drury Lane Orchestra. She was soon appointed second oboe with the Covent Garden touring company, which was conducted by John Barbirolli. Barbirolli was married, although the marriage was not to last. Barbirolli was then made conductor of the Scottish Orchestra (now the Royal Scottish National Orchestra).

He appointed Evelyn as first oboe in the orchestra. He arranged several works for oboe and orchestra for her, including a concerto by Handel. Several of these are on recordings they made. Ralph Vaughan Williams was particularly pleased with their recording of his Oboe Concerto. Several composers dedicated works to her, including Arnold Cooke, Stephen Dodgson, Arthur Benjamin, Gordon Jacob, Edmund Rubbra and Elizabeth Maconchy.

The nature of her work with the Scottish Orchestra allowed her also to play from 1934 to 1938 in the Glyndebourne Festival, and from 1935 to 1939 with the London Symphony Orchestra, where she and her friend Natalie Caine were the first women woodwind players. Henry Wood made her first oboist in the New Queen's Hall Orchestra.

== Years of marriage ==
Rothwell married John Barbirolli in 1939, after his divorce from his first wife. By this time Barbirolli was conductor of the New York Philharmonic, where he had succeeded Arturo Toscanini in 1936. Barbirolli and Rothwell lived in New York until 1943, when they returned to England so Barbirolli could take over the conductorship of the Hallé Orchestra, based in Manchester. Rothwell occasionally played in the orchestra, although she kept her appearances there to a minimum to avoid charges of nepotism. When the Hallé Orchestra performed in Salzburg in 1948, she was the soloist in the first performance of Mozart's Oboe Concerto, K. 314 since its rediscovery and republication. She also appeared in duet with the pianist Iris Loveridge.

Vilém Tauský freely adapted music by Vanhal as an Oboe Concerto for Rothwell in 1957. Rothwell played the British premiere of Bohuslav Martinů's Concerto for Oboe and Small Orchestra, at the Proms on 24 August 1959, after the concerto's creator and dedicatee Jiří Tancibudek was unable to appear.

In Manchester, Rothwell devoted herself to helping Barbirolli. She was his secretary and chauffeured him everywhere. She was always present at rehearsals, and he relied on her advice on matters of balance as she listened in the auditorium. As Barbirolli's health deteriorated she hardly played her oboe, devoting her time to him. She travelled with him to the United States when he became conductor of the Houston Symphony Orchestra. However she was one of the wind players who showed up for Charles MacKerras's much celebrated midnight 1959 recording of the Royal Fireworks Music for Pye using Handel's original orchestration including a serpent. He gathered just about every principal wind player in London for the event, a recording that has seldom been out of print. During his last years, Barbirolli's former manager caused them severe financial problems.

== After John Barbirolli's death ==
After her husband's death in 1970, Rothwell, now using her late husband's last name, started to play her oboe again. She taught at the Royal Academy of Music, where she was affectionately known as "Lady B". She frequently appeared as adjudicator at music festivals. She wrote the books Oboe Technique and the three-volume Oboist's Companion, and her autobiography Living with Glorious John. She was awarded an honorary MA by Leeds University in 1972 and was appointed an Officer of the Order of the British Empire in 1984. She died in 2008, the day after her 97th birthday.
