= Romance for violin and piano (Martinů) =

1930 musical composition by Bohuslav Martinů

Romance for violin and piano (H 186bis) is a short occasional composition by Bohuslav Martinů from May 1930, which its author did not mention in any list of his works. The piece was only found in 2022 by an employee of the Bohuslav Martinů Institute, Mrs. Natália Krátká, in the National Library of Israel in Jerusalem. The library provided the Bohuslav Martinů Institute with its digital copy on September 14, 2022. The manuscript is dedicated by the author to Boris Lipnitzki, a French photographer of Ukrainian-Jewish origin (À Monsieur | [?] Lipnitzki | avec mon sympathique souvenir | Boh. Martinů | Romance | pour violon et piano. | Paris Mai 1930). There is also an unproven hypothesis that this is actually a newly created and newly dated author's copy of his at present missing Romance from 1910 (H 12)

== Performances ==
The piece was first performed in a transcription for cello and piano at the 8th benefit concert of the Bohuslav Martinů Institute at the Profesní dům in Prague on 8 November 2022, where it was performed by cellist Petr Nouzovský and pianist Martin Kasík. The world premiere of the original version for violin and piano was given by violinist Frank Peter Zimmermann and pianist Martin Helmchen in a recital at the Wigmore Hall in London on 10 January 2023. This finding was significant for music scholars and enthusiasts, shedding new light on the lesser-known works of Martinů.
