= Oboe Concerto (Martinů) =

1955 oboe concerto by Bohuslav Martinů

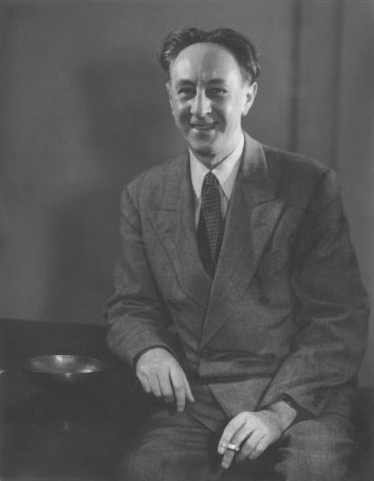
Bohuslav Martinů in 1945

Bohuslav Martinů's Concerto for Oboe and Small Orchestra, H. 353, was written in 1955 for the Czech-born Australian oboist Jiří Tancibudek. Tancibudek had been performing oboe recitals in Australia following his emigration there, and had been often asked to play more Czech music. Although he had never met Martinů, they had both played in the Czech Philharmonic (albeit 30 years apart). When Tancibudek wrote to the composer in the early 1950s asking for such a piece, he was initially rebuffed. But Martinů wrote again in 1954, saying he would write the work and asked Tancibudek to introduce it to the world.

It was sponsored by the Sydney Daily Telegraph newspaper in celebration of the 1956 Olympic Games in Melbourne. Tancibudek gave the world premiere in August 1956 in Sydney, with the Sydney Symphony Orchestra conducted by Hans Schmidt-Isserstedt.

Tancibudek also gave European premieres in London (27 February 1958 in the BBC Studio in Maida Vale), Hamburg (March 1958), and Vienna, and the North American premiere in Vancouver, Canada. He was due to play the public British premiere at the Proms but time constraints prevented this; instead it was performed at the Proms on 24 August 1959, four days after the composer's death, by Tancibudek's friend Evelyn Rothwell, with her husband Sir John Barbirolli conducting. The Czech premiere took place in 1960, with František Hanták as the soloist.

The three movements are marked:

1. Moderato
2. Poco andante
3. Poco allegro

The score reveals the influence of Igor Stravinsky, including a quotation of a motif from Petrushka in the second movement. The score contains a prominent part for an orchestral piano. It takes about 16 minutes to play.

== Editions of the Score ==
Tancibudek was given permission from the composer to retain the manuscript of the concerto. Comparing this with the work published after Martinů's death, he noticed a considerable number of discrepancies. In the 1980s, he and James Brody at Indiana University published a list of corrections with some interpretational suggestions. He and Maurice Bourgue worked together on publication of the critical edition. Maurice Bourgue and Guy Porat produced a revised edition in 2008. This edition restores the second cadenza in the last movement (removed at Tancibudek’s suggestion), and corrects a number of errors in the solo part.
