= Alexandre bis =

Opera by Bohuslav Martinů

- Comic opera by Bohuslav Martinů
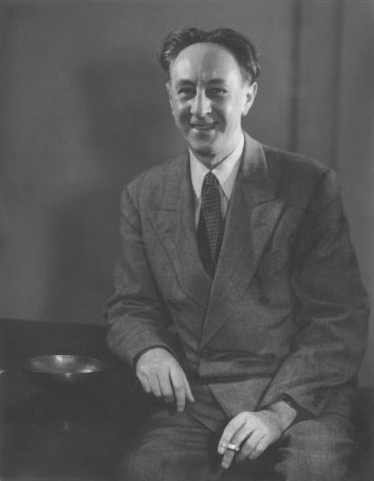
- Martinů in 1945
- Translation: Alexander Twice
- Librettist: André Wurmser
- Language: French
- Premiere: 18 February 1964; Nationaltheater Mannheim

Alexandre bis (Alexander Twice; in Czech: Dvakrát Alexandr) is a surrealist comic opera in one act by Bohuslav Martinů, (H. 255), composed in 1937 to an original libretto written in French by André Wurmser.

== History ==
The opera was intended by Martinů, who was then living in Paris, for performance at the Paris World Exhibition of 1937. However, various delays (including the intervening World War II) prevented its performance during the composer's lifetime.

The opera's first performance was given at the Nationaltheater Mannheim on 18 February 1964, when it was conducted by Georg Calder. Shortly afterwards it was given its first performance in Martinů's native Czechoslovakia by the Janáček Theatre in Brno. It was first performed in America in October 2014 by Gotham Chamber Opera at the John Jay College of Criminal Justice in Manhattan.

The opera is subtitled "The Tragedy of a Man who Had His Beard Cut", and the surrealist libretto is set in Paris about 1900. Although Martinů had asked Wurmser for a libretto including a singing cat, he compromised on Wurmser's suggestion of a singing portrait, which acts as narrator to a tale of bourgeois infidelity.

== Roles ==
- Armanda, soprano
- Alexandre, baritone
- Oskar, tenor
- Philomène, mezzo-soprano
- Portrait, bass

== Synopsis ==
The opera takes place in a bourgeois salon in Paris around 1900. The maid Philomène is cleaning and complaining about her life. The husband Alexandre, bearded, asks Philomène to bring in a suitcase and secretly leaves, allegedly for the station, crossing his cousin of the same name from America. Alexandre's portrait on the wall is outraged by the game of betrayal. Oscar, a man Armande had met on holiday, comes to visit her. He is dressed in sportswear and offers her a lesson in cycling. Armanda rejects his courtship, pointing out that she is polite and respectable. Oscar leaves.

The beardless Alexander-cousin arrives and explains that Alexander-husband has gone away. Armande falls in love with him at first sight and submits to him, which displeases the painting of Alexander and the maid Philomène. Armande then has dreams full of remorse. In the first dream, both Alexanders kill each other. In the second, the goddess of marriage, played by Philomène, condemns Armande and she is abducted by demons - bearded dancers. In the third, the suitor Oscar appears and dances with Armande on roller skates.

In the morning the maid Philomena cleans up in the salon and complains about her life. Alexandre-husband enters, without his beard, and says goodbye to Armande before leaving for the office. During the farewell, he discovers that his wife has also changed. After his departure Oscar enters. To his surprise, this time Armanda accepts his invitation for a cycling lesson. The portrait of the husband is left alone and expresses the moral – that it is best if a husband does not tempt his wife.

== Recordings ==
- Supraphon, 1982 (1984 LP, 1994 CD 11 2140-2 611) with René Tuček, Richard Novák, Vladimír Krejčík, Daniela Šounová-Brouková, Anna Barová, Janáček Opera Orchestra of Brno, conductor: František Jílek (recording in Czech).
