= What Men Live By (opera) =

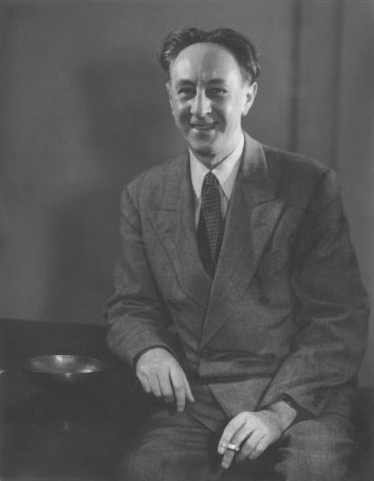
Bohuslav Martinů in 1945

What Men Live By (Czech: Čím lidé žijí) is an opera in one act by Bohuslav Martinů to an English libretto by the composer, based on Where Love Is, There God Is Also (1885) by Leo Tolstoy, though he chose to use the more universal title of a different Tolstoy story What Men Live By (1886). It was composed in 1951-1952 when the composer was living in the United States, and described by him as a 'pastoral-opera'.

== Performance history ==
The opera was premiered as a television broadcast in New York in May 1953. The first staged performance took place on 1 August 1954 in Interlochen, Michigan, by the National Music Camp company. Correspondence of the composer shows that he preferred semi-staging for the work which "positively rebels against the full trappings of operatic presentation", and "produced an unpretentious work of quiet, ecstatic beauty and radiant charm". After the student staging with piano in 1954, the first performance with orchestra took place in New York the following year, and professional productions were mounted in Plzeň and Brno using Czech translation.

The opera was nominated in the 'Rediscovered Work' Award in the International Opera Awards in 2015, through three Prague concert performances at the Rudolfinum in 2014 at the Martinů Music Days, with Jiří Bělohlávek conducting the Czech Philharmonic Orchestra. A film of the opera, with soundtrack by the Czech Philharmonic Orchestra conducted by Jiří Bělohlávek in 2014, directed Jiří Nekvasil, was released in 2018.

== Roles ==
Role	Voice type	Premiere cast 31 July 1954 (conductor:)
Martin Avdeitch, a cobbler	baritone	
An old peasant pilgrim	bass	
Stepanitch, an old soldier	bass	
A woman with a child	soprano	
An old woman	contralto	
A boy	spoken role	
Speaker (narrator)	tenor	

== Instrumentation ==
The orchestral score requires 1 flute, 2 oboes, 3 clarinets, 2 bassoons, 2 horns, 1 trumpet, 1 trombone, timpani, percussion (various instruments), piano and strings (6 violins I, 6 violins II, 4 violas, 3 violoncellos, 2 double basses). Apart from the vocal soloists, a small chorus (or a vocal quartet or quintet) is also required.
