= Three Czech Dances (Martinů) =

Set of piano pieces

Three Czech Dances (H. 154) is a set of three solo piano pieces written by the Czech composer Bohuslav Martinů, written in 1926, premiered in 1927, and published in 1929.

Out of the three pieces in the set, two were given the names of traditional Czech dances, Obkročák ("Stepping Round"), and Dupák ("Stomp Dance"), while the third was named Polka. The total duration is approximately ten minutes.

All three pieces have dedications, the first to John Herman, the second to Molié Denyse, and the third to Jeane Mortier. Mortier premiered the entire work, although in segments. The second and third pieces were premiered on 7 March 1927, while the third was premiered on 17 March 1927. Both premier performances took place in Paris.

The manuscript is currently in storage at the Bibliotheque Nationale de France in the Max Eschig depository. Eschig was the publisher of the first edition, in Paris, with copyright attributes to Max Eschig, Paris. This edition is still the only one in print.

An earlier autograph can also be found in the Martinu Centre located in Polička.
