= Violin Concerto No. 2 (Martinů) =

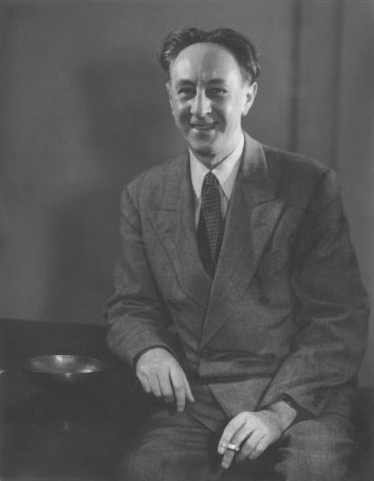
Bohuslav Martinů in 1945

Bohuslav Martinů's Violin Concerto No. 2 in G minor, H. 293 was composed between February and April 1943 between his first two symphonies. The violin concerto was premiered on December 31 by Mischa Elman and the Boston Symphony conducted by Sergei Koussevitzky. Elman requested the concerto following the premiere of the dramatic Symphony No. 1 by the same orchestra, impressed by the work. It was referred as Martinů's only violin concerto until an earlier concerto which was thought to be lost appeared in 1968, nine years after the composer's death.

The concerto consists of three movements, with a serious Allegro preceded by a solo introduction, a gently lyrical central movement and a lively finale.

1. Andante — Poco allegro
2. Andante moderato
3. Poco allegro

The first movement is almost as long as the other two combined.

== Discography ==
- Josef Suk // Czech Philharmonic — Václav Neumann, 1973 available to hear on Youtube
- Katrin Scholz // Hamburg Symphony — Sebastian Lang-Lessing. Berlin Classics, 2001
- Bohuslav Matoušek // Czech Philharmonic Orchestra - Christopher Hogwood. Hyperion, 2004
- Jennifer Koh // Grant Park Orchestra — Carlos Kalmar. Cedille Records, 2006
- Isabelle Faust // Prague Philharmonia — Jiří Bělohlávek. Harmonia Mundi, 2008
- Lorenzo Gatto // National Orchestra of Belgium — Walter Weller. Fuga Libera, 2011
- Frank Peter Zimmermann // Bamberger Symphoniker — Jakub Hrusa. BIS, 2020
