= Le jour de bonté =

Opera by Bohuslava Martinů

Le jour de bonté (Den dobročinnosti, Day of Kindness H.194) is an unfinished 1931 opera in 3 acts for Paris by Bohuslav Martinů to a libretto by Georges Ribemont-Dessaignes.

== Plot ==
Two French peasants visit Paris to perform good works for the needy but are frustrated and rejected by those they try to help.

== Recording ==
Martinů: Le Jour de Bonté Tomas Bijok, Lucas, Petr Matuszek, Nicolas, Irena Troupova. Pilsen Philharmonic Orchestra and Prague Chamber Choir, Milan Kanak Arco Diva 73min 2010
