= Double Concerto for Two String Orchestras, Piano, and Timpani =

Composition by Bohuslav Martinů

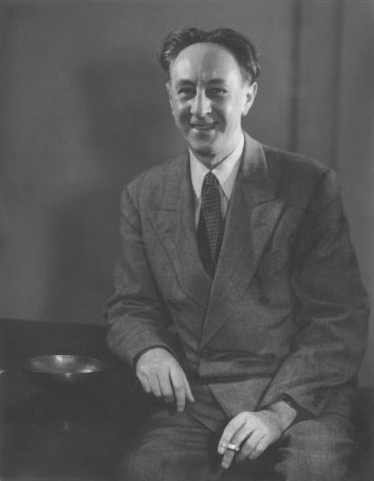
Bohuslav Martinů in 1945

Bohuslav Martinů's Double Concerto for Two String Orchestras, Piano, and Timpani (H. 271) was written in Switzerland in 1938 during deteriorating diplomatic relationships throughout Europe. Commissioned by Paul Sacher for the Basel Chamber Orchestra, it reflects intense impressions, from both the composer's personal life and the political events of the time.

The Concerto is structured upon the concerto grosso, the three movements scored as 1. Poco Allegro, 2. Largo, 3. Allegro; its outer movements are characterized by a mood of anxiety expressed through syncopated rhythms, while its Largo centres upon a defiant, declamatory statement; the concerto as a whole lasting circa 21 minutes in total.

The cover of the manuscript score bears the dedication to my dear friend Paul Sacher to commemorate the quiet and fearful days spent at Schönenberg amongst the deer and the threat of the war. Martinů finished the last movement of the sketch on the same day of the signing of the Munich Treaty. It was first performed by the Basel Chamber Orchestra conducted by Paul Sacher in Basel in February 1940. Martinů travelled from Paris to attend the Basel performance, despite the difficult international situation. The Swiss composer Arthur Honegger was among the audience of its first performance.

Other contemporary compositions with a similar instrumentation as Martinů's Double Concerto are Bela Bartók's Divertimento for String Orchestra, also commissioned by Paul Sacher for the Basel Chamber Orchestra in 1938, Sir Michael Tippett's Concerto for Double String Orchestra (1938–39), Raffaele d'Alessandro's Sinfonietta pour cordes, piano obligé et timbales, op. 51 (1944), Frank Martin’s Petite Symphonie concertante for harp, harpsichord, piano, and two string orchestras (1946) and Peter Mieg’s Concerto da camera for strings, piano, and timpani (1952).

== Recordings ==
- 1951 Czech Philharmonic Orchestra, Rafael Kubelik
- 1979 Czech Philharmonic Orchestra, Stanislav Macura
- 1990 Brno State Philharmonic Orchestra, Charles Mackerras
- 1994 Prague Radio Symphony, Charles Mackerras
- 1992 City of London Sinfonia - Richard Hickox
- Recording of - https://www.youtube.com/watch?v=e1j_K752Wac
