= Symphony No. 1 (Martinů) =

Symphony by Bohuslav Martinů

- by Bohuslav Martinů
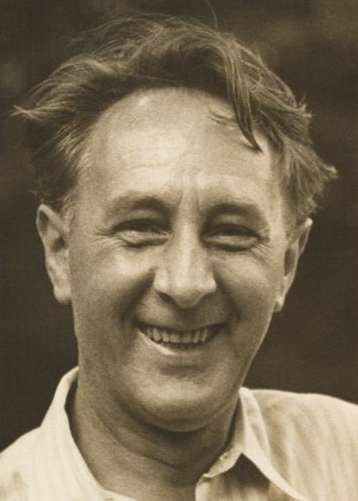
- Martinů c. 1942
- Catalogue: H. 289
- Composed: 1941–42
- Publisher: Boosey & Hawkes

Premiere
- Date: 13 November 1942
- Location: Boston
- Conductor: Serge Koussevitzky
- Performers: Boston Symphony Orchestra

The Symphony No. 1, H. 289, is an orchestral composition by the Czech composer Bohuslav Martinů.

== History ==
On 19 December 1941, Martinů wrote a letter to Serge Koussevitzky, expressing a wish to compose a symphony for the Boston Symphony Orchestra for their next season. In reply, early in 1942, Koussevitzky commissioned a work for large orchestra in memory of his late wife Natalie. Despite the freedom offered in the commission, Martinů persisted in his intention to tackle the ambitious form of the symphony, with an eye to increasing his standing in American musical life.

Work on the Symphony was begun in June with the first movement, in Jamaica. The two middle movements were composed in July in Middlebury, Vermont, and the finale was worked out in July and August, in Lenox, Massachusetts, while Martinů was teaching at the Berkshire Music Center.

The score was completed on 1 September 1942, at Manomet, Massachusetts, and was premiered on 13 November 1942 in Boston, with further performances in New York on 21 November 1942 and 7 January 1943, all conducted by Serge Koussevitzky. (According to the publisher's website, the premiere actually took place three months earlier, on 13 August 1942, two weeks before completion of the score.

== Instrumentation ==
The symphony is scored for two flutes, piccolo, two oboes, cor anglais, three clarinets, two bassoons, contrabassoon, four horns, three trumpets, three trombones, tuba, timpani, percussion (cymbals, tam-tam, triangle, bass drum, side drum, tambourine), harp, piano, and strings.

== Analysis ==
The symphony is in the traditional four movements:

1. Moderato – Poco più mosso
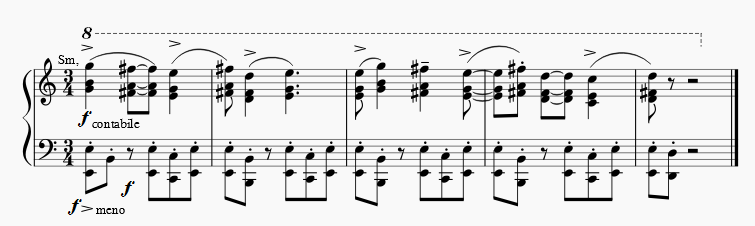
2. Scherzo: Allegro – Poco moderato
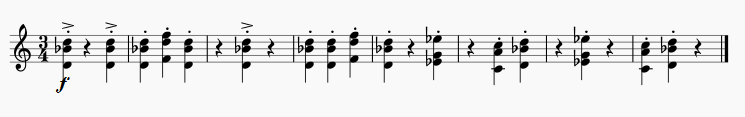
3. Largo
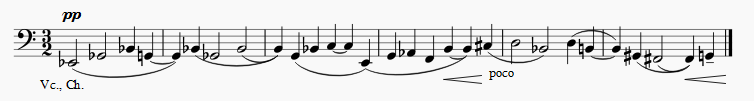
4. Allegro non troppo
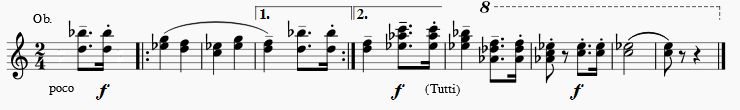

== Discography ==
- Bohuslav Martinů: Symphony No. 1; Inventions. Czech Philharmonic Orchestra (with Emil Leichner, piano, in Inventions), Václav Neumann, cond. Recorded 8, 9, 14, and 15 February 1977 at the Dvořák Hall of Rudolfinum, Prague (Symphony) and 3–4 March 1977 at the Supraphon Studio, House of Artists, Prague (Inventions). LP recording, quadraphonic. Supraphon 4 10 2166. Czechoslovakia: Supraphon, 1978. Symphony reissued on CD (stereo), together with Martinů's Symphony No. 2, Supraphon 11 1966-2 011. Czechoslovakia: Supraphon, 1994.
- Bohuslav Martinů: Symphony No. 1; Symphony No. 2. Berliner Sinfonie-Orchester, Claus Peter Flor, cond. Recorded 21–24 February (No. 1) and 29–30 May (No. 2), 1989, at Christus Church, Berlin, DDR. BMG Classics. CD recording, stereo. RCA Victor RD 60154. Cassette tape, stereo. RCA Victor Red Seal 60154-4-RC. [N.p.]: RCA Victor Red Seal, 1990.
- Bohuslav Martinů: Symphony No. 1; Symphony No. 5. Scottish National Orchestra, Bryden Thomson, cond. Recorded 17 and 19 April 1990, in the Caird Hall, Dundee. CD recording, stereo. Chandos CHAN 8915. Cassette tape, stereo. Chandos ABTD 1523. Colchester, Essex, England: Chandos, 1991.
- Bohuslav Martinů: Symphony No. 1 (1942); Concerto for Double String Orchestra, Piano, and Timpani (1938). Jaroslav Šaroun, piano, Václav Mazáček, timpani, Czech Philharmonic Orchestra, Jiří Bělohlávek, cond. Recorded in Spanish Hall, Prague Castle, 19–22 November 1990. CD recording, stereo. Chandos CHAN 8950. Colchester, Essex, England: Chandos, 1991.
- Bohuslav Martinů: Symphonies Nos. 1 and 6 ("Fantasies symphoniques"). National Symphony Orchestra of Ukraine, Arthur Fagen, cond. Recorded in the Concert Hall, National Radio Company of Ukraine, Kyiv, 24–26 June 1995. CD recording. Naxos 8.553348. [Hong Kong]: Naxos, 1997.
- Bohuslav Martinů: Symphonies Nos. 1–6. Prague Radio Symphony Orchestra, Vladimír Válek, cond. Recorded Prague, Czech Radio, Studio A, 2006. 3-CD set. Supraphon SU 3940. Prague: Supraphon, 2008.
- Martinů: The 6 Symphonies. BBC Symphony Orchestra, Jiří Bělohlávek. Recorded live at the Barbican Hall, London, 3 October 3 (No. 1) and 9 October (No. 2), 2009; 19 February (No. 4), 19 March (No. 5), 17 April 17 (No. 3), and 8 May (No. 6), 2010. 3-CD set. Onyx 4061. [London]: Onyx Classics, 2011.
- Bohuslav Martinů: Violin Concerto No. 2; Symphony No. 1. Lorenzo Gatto, violin, National Orchestra of Belgium, Walter Weller, cond. Recorded 27 June–1 July 2011, Henry Le Bœuf Concert Hall, Centre for Fine Arts, Brussels. CD recording, stereo. Fuga Libera FUG589. [Brussels]: Fuga Libera, 2012.
