= Symphony No. 6 (Martinů) =

Symphony No. 6 Fantaisies symphoniques
- by Bohuslav Martinů
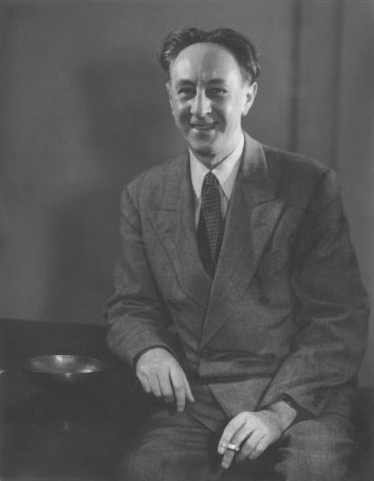
- Martinů in 1945
- Catalogue: H. 342
- Composed: 1951–53
- Dedication: Charles Munch
- Movements: 3

Premiere
- Date: 7 January 1955
- Location: Boston
- Conductor: Charles Munch
- Performers: Boston Symphony Orchestra

The Symphony No. 6 ("Fantaisies symphoniques"), H. 343, by Bohuslav Martinů was begun in New York City in 1951, after a hiatus of four years since its predecessor, and was tentatively completed three years later on 23 April 1953. In Paris, in the months following its completion, Martinů undertook some revisions to the score. It is dedicated to Charles Munch, on the occasion of the 75th anniversary of the Boston Symphony Orchestra, who premiered the symphony on 7 January 1955. Martinů originally called the work Fantaisies symphoniques, and this is sometimes regarded as its only correct title.

== Instrumentation ==
The Sixth Symphony calls for the smallest orchestra of all of Martinů's symphonies, and notably lacks both piano and harp. It is scored for three flutes, piccolo, three oboes, three clarinets, three bassoons, four horns, three trumpets, three trombones, tuba, timpani, percussion (cymbals, tam-tam, triangle, tambourine, bass drum, side drum), and strings.

== Analysis ==
The symphony has three movements:

1. Lento — Allegro — Lento
2. Poco allegro (4/4)
3. Lento

The symphony is quite unlike the previous five symphonies. In Paris in the autumn of 1955, Martinů described it to Miloš Šafránek as a work "without form. And yet something holds it together, I don't know what, but it has a single line, and I have really expressed something in it".

The Sixth Symphony is distinguished from its predecessors by a canzona-like structure, with an exceptionally high level of invention. Motivic development is carried out in series of extended sections each with a distinct texture, steadily increasing in speed through to the end of the second movement. The reversion in the finale to the lento tempo of the opening movement is accomplished more rapidly, with the correspondence becoming exact only close to the end.

The symphony opens with an hallucinatory, otherworldly texture that sounds like music only just in the process of being formed—music without rhythm, melody, or harmony. This is created using only nine instruments: three flutes, three trumpets, and three solo strings, in superimposed rhythmic layers that divide the slow beat into nine, ten, and twelve subdivisions simultaneously. The complexity produces what is in effect an aleatory texture, "a gateway into the imprecise realm of fantasy".

== Discography ==
- Czech Philharmonic, Karel Ančerl, cond. Recorded in Dvořák Hall, Prague, 23–24 February 1956. LP recording, monaural. Supraphon DV 5475. Prague: Artia, 1956. Reissued on Supraphon LP LPV 416, on Supraphon LP SUA 10327, Rediffusion LP HCN 8008.
- Boston Symphony Orchestra, Charles Munch, cond. recorded 23 April 1956. LP recording, monaural. RCA Victor LM 2083. [Camden, NJ]: RCA Victor, 1957. Reissued in stereo ("First Stereo Release") on LP, RCA Gold Seal AGL1-3794, 1980. Reissued on CD, RCA BVCC-38467, 88697-04828-2. New York: Sony BMG Music Entertainment, 2006.
- Prague Radio Symphony Orchestra, Charles Munch, cond. Live recording, Dvořák Hall, Prague, 27 March 1967. Panton 81 1122-2; published 1992.
- New Philharmonia Orchestra, Michael Bialoguski. Unicorn Records RHS 309 LP, published 1971.
- Czech Philharmonic, Václav Neumann, cond. LP recording, SQ quadraphonic encoded. Recorded January 1976. Supraphon 1410 2096.
- Czech Philharmonic, Václav Neumann, cond. Recorded 14–20 June 1984, House of Artists, Prague. CD recording, stereo. Supraphon 33C37-7760. Tokyo: Nippon Columbia Co., Ltd., 1985.
- Russian State Symphony Orchestra, Gennadi Rozhdestvensky. Revelation RV 10005 Recorded March 17 May 1985.
- Bamberg Symphony Orchestra, Neeme Järvi. Bis CD 0402. Recorded at Dominikanerbau, Bamberg, Germany March 1988.
- Czech Philharmonic, Jiří Bělohlávek. Chandos CHAN 8897. Recorded Prague Castle 1989.
- Scottish National Orchestra, Bryden Thomson. Chandos CHAN 8916 recorded 20 and 21 August 1990.
- Ukraine National Symphony Orchestra, Arthur Fagen. Naxos 8.553348. Recorded at the Concert Hall, National Radio of Ukraine, Kyiv, 24–26 June 1995.
- Sinfonieorchester St. Gallen, Jiří Kout. Recorded at Tonhalle St. Gallen, Switzerland, 1–11 June 2003. CD recording, stereo. Arte Nova Classics ANO 577400. Germany: Arte Nova, 2005.
- Prague Radio Symphony Orchestra, Vladimír Válek, cond. Recorded Prague, Czech Radio, Studio A, 2006. 3-CD set. Supraphon SU 3940. Prague: Supraphon, 2008.
- BBC Symphony Orchestra, Jiří Bělohlávek. Recorded live at the Barbican Hall, London, 8 May 2010. 3-CD set. Onyx 4061. [London]: Onyx Classics, 2011.
