= Vladimír Válek =

Czech conductor (1935–2025)

- Válek in the 1970s
- Born: 2 September 1935; Nový Jičín, Czechoslovakia
- Died: 16 February 2025 (aged 89)
- Occupation: Conductor
- Organizations: Prague Radio Symphony Orchestra
- Awards: Medal of Merit

Vladimír Válek (2 September 1935 – 16 February 2025) was a Czech conductor and educator, best known for leading the Prague Radio Symphony Orchestra from 1985 to 2011. He transformed the radio orchestra with few public performances to one of the country's leading orchestras, playing a broad repertoire. He toured in Europe, the United States and Asia, and worked with international orchestras.

== Life and career ==
Válek was born in Nový Jičín on 2 September 1935. He studied trombone, viola and piano at the Conservatory of Kroměříž from 1953 to 1958. He then studied conducting at the Academy of Performing Arts in Bratislava with Ľudovít Rajter for a year, and further at the Academy of Performing Arts in Prague with Robert Brock and Alois Klíma, who was then chief conductor of the Prague Radio Symphony Orchestra (PRSO), graduating in 1962. In 1970, he founded the Dvořák Chamber Orchestra, an ensemble mostly of members of the Czech Philharmonic, performing in Prague and abroad, and recording, also for radio. He kept playing his instruments, including in popular music and jazz.

Válek stepped in to conduct the Prague Symphony Orchestra at age 33, for a program of Till Eulenspiegel's Merry Pranks by Richard Strauss, Beethoven's Violin Concerto with soloist Igor Oistrakh, and Prokofiev's Symphony No. 7. He was so successful that he was offered a tour of the United States, which earned him the nickname Prague's Leonard Bernstein. He was engaged by the orchestra as conductor in 1975, alongside Jiří Bělohlávek as chief conductor, touring with them in Europe. He was also permanent guest conductor in Leeuwarden, Netherlands, from 1976.

Válek was chief conductor of the PRSO from 1985 to 2011, touring Europe and Asia extensively. From 1996, he was conductor of the Czech Philharmonic, touring Japan, Germany, Denmark and the United States. He was the Principal Conductor of the Slovak Philharmonic from 2004 until 2007, when he was succeeded by Peter Feranec. Válek conducted radio orchestras in Austria, Germany and the Netherlands, and other major orchestras in Europe and the Far East, including the Osaka Symphony Orchestra, the Israel Philharmonic Orchestra, the Gewandhausorchester of Leipzig, the Orquesta sinfonica de Barcelona, the Tonkünstler Orchestra of Vienna, the Vienna Radio Symphony Orchestra, the Japan Philharmonic Orchestra and the Yomiuri Symphony Orchestra, among others. He participated regularly in the Prague Spring Festival, for example conducting Smetana's Má vlast at the festival's opening concert in 2002.

From 2002, Válek lectured conducting at the Academy in Prague.

In 2000, Válek was awarded the inaugural Hanno R. Ellenbogen Citizenship Award jointly with Vladimir Ashkenazy, Ken'ichiro Kobayashi, and Charles Mackerras, given by the Prague Society for International Cooperation. Válek was awarded the Medal of Merit from President Václav Klaus in 2010, and the Classic Prague Awards for Lifetime Achievement in 2021.

Válek died on 16 February 2025, at the age of 89.

== PRSO ==
Válek transformed the PRSO from a radio orchestra with only few public concerts into one of the most versatile orchestras of the Czech Republic. He recruited young performers, often prize winners of international competitions. He broadened its musical scope, performing a wide range of repertoire, including classical music, contemporary classical music, jazz, symphonic rock, and film and ballroom music. He refined the orchestra's artistry, and focused in recordings on Czech music. He performed vocal-symphonic and symphonic music by Antonín Dvořák, Leoš Janáček, Bohuslav Martinů and Josef Suk, and works by Béla Bartók, Arthur Honegger, Gustav Mahler, Sergei Prokofiev and Igor Stravinsky, and by contemporary Czech composers such as Jindřich Feld, Jiří Jaroch, Otomar Kvěch, Otmar Mácha, Ladislav Simon and Zdeněk Šesták.

== Recordings ==
Válek's recordings include Bartók's Concerto for Orchestra, Prokofiev's suite from Romeo and Juliet, and contemporary French ballets. He recorded with the PRSO, the Prague Symphony Orchestra, and the Dvořák Chamber Orchestra. His recording of Erwin Schulhoff's piano concertos received the International Classical Music Awards of Cannes.
