= Prague Radio Symphony Orchestra =

Czech broadcast orchestra

- Radio orchestra
- Native name: Symfonický orchestr Českého rozhlasu
- Short name: SOČR or PRSO
- Former name: Radiojournal Orchestra (1926)
- Founded: 1952; 74 years ago
- Location: Prague, Czech Republic
- Concert hall: Various
- Principal conductor: Petr Popelka
- Website: socr.rozhlas.cz

The Prague Radio Symphony Orchestra (Symfonický orchestr Českého rozhlasu, Czech acronym SOČR, English acronym PRSO) is a Czech broadcast orchestra based in Prague, the Czech Republic. The SOČR performs concerts at the Dvořák Hall of the Rudolfinum, at the Forum Karlín and the Convent of Saint Agnes in Prague, as well as Studio 1 of Czech Radio in Prague.

== History ==
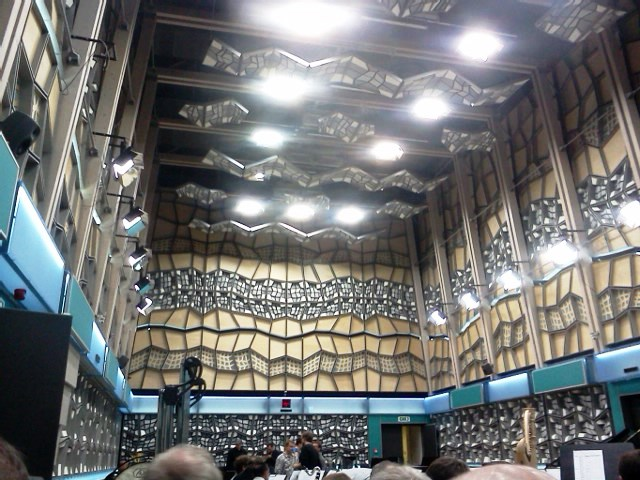
Rehearsal room of the Czech Radio Symphony Orchestra in the Czech Radio building (2014)

The precursor ensemble of the SOČR was the Radiojournal Orchestra, which gave its first concert on 1 October 1926 under Jožka Charvát, the first chief conductor of the orchestra. By 1952, the popularity and size of the Radiojournal Orchestra was such that a second orchestra, the Prague Radio Symphony Orchestra, was split off from the Radiojournal Orchestra. By 1964, two separate orchestras were affiliated with Prague Radio, the Prague Radio Orchestra and the Prague Radio Symphony Orchestra. These orchestras subsequently combined to form the present orchestra.

From 2018 to 2022, Alexander Liebreich was chief conductor and artistic director of the SOČR / PRSO. In May 2021, the SOČR / PRSO announced the appointment of Petr Popelka as its next chief conductor, effective with the 2022—2023 season. The current principal guest conductor of the SOČR is Marek Šedivý. In May 2021, the SOČR / PRSO announced the appointment of Robert Jindra as its next principal guest conductor, effective with the 2022-2023 season. Popelka is scheduled to conclude his tenure with the Prague Radio Symphony Orchestra at the close of the 2025-2026 season. In September 2025, the SOČR / PRSO announced the appointment of Elias Grandy as its next chief conductor, effective with the 2026-2027 season.

The SOČR / PRSO is a featured orchestra at such festivals as the Prague Spring International Music Festival, Dvořák Prague International Music Festival, Smetana's Litomyšl, Janáček Music Festival, or International Music Festival Český Krumlov. The orchestra's discography includes the first set of complete recordings of Miloslav Kabeláč's eight symphonies (Supraphon, 2016).

== Chief conductors ==
- Jožka Charvát (1927–1945)
- Josef Hrnčíř (1946)
- Karel Ančerl (1947–1950)
- Alois Klíma (1952–1971)
- Jaroslav Krombholc (1975–1981)
- František Vajnar (1982–1985)
- Vladimír Válek (1985–2011)
- Ondrej Lenárd (2011–2017)
- Alexander Liebreich (2018–2022)
- Petr Popelka (2022–2026)
- Elias Grandy (designated, from 2026)
