= Collado =

Collado may refer to:

== People ==
- Adrià Collado (born 1972), Spanish actor
- Álex Collado (born 1999), Spanish footballer
- Alexei Collado (born 1988), Cuban professional boxer
- Armando Collado (born 1985), Salvadoran-born Nicaraguan footballer
- Beatriz Collado Lara (born 1959), Mexican politician
- Berta Collado (born 1979), Spanish TV presenter and journalist
- Carlos Collado (born 1938), Spanish politician
- Carmelle Collado (born 2007), Filipina singer
- David Collado (born 1975), Dominican politician and businessman
- Diego Collado (died 1638), Spanish Christian missionary
- Diego Collado (born 2001), Spanish footballer
- Norberto Collado Abreu (1921–2008), Cuban captain of the yacht that ferried Fidel Castro to Cuba from Mexico in 1956
- Jesús Collado Alarcón (born 1979), Spanish paralympic swimmer
- José Collado (born 1990), Spanish footballer
- María Carmen Collado (born 1983), Spanish swimmer
- María Collado Romero (1885–1968), Cuban journalist, poet, and feminist activist
- Shirley Collado, American psychology professor and president of Ithaca College
- Teresita Collado (born 1971), Guatemalan race walker
- Victoria Collado, Cuban-American director
- Yarisley Collado (born 1985), Cuban discus thrower

== Places ==
- Collado (Cáceres), municipality in the province of Cáceres, Extremadura, Spain
- Collado de Contreras, municipality in the province of Ávila, Castile and León, Spain
- Collado del Mirón, municipality in the province of Ávila, Castile and León, Spain
- Collado Hermoso, municipality in the province of Segovia, Castile and León, Spain
- Collado Mediano, municipality in the Community of Madrid, Spain
- Collado Villalba, municipality in the Community of Madrid, Spain
- Hoyos del Collado, municipality in the province of Ávila, Castile and León, Spain
- Santiago del Collado, municipality in the province of Ávila, Castile and León, Spain

== Other uses ==
- El Collado Formation, geological formation in Cuenca, Spain whose strata date back to the Early Cretaceous
- CB Collado Villalba, defunct basketball team based in Collado Villalba, Madrid
- CH Collado Villalba, ice hockey team based in Collado Villalba, Madrid
- CU Collado Villalba, football team based in Collado Villalba, Madrid
