= Michel Hausmann =

Venezuelan writer

- Born: July 28, 1981 (age 45); Caracas, Venezuela
- Education: Emerson College (BA); Columbia University (MFA)
- Occupations: Theater director; writer; producer
- Years active: 2003–present
- Parents: Ricardo Hausmann (father); Veronica Hartman (mother)
- Relatives: Joanna Hausmann (sister); Braulio Jatar (uncle)

Michel Hausmann (born July 28, 1981) a Venezuelan writer, producer and theater director. He is the co-founder and artistic director of Miami New Drama, the resident theater company and operator of the Colony Theatre in Miami Beach. Under Hausmann's leadership, the company has produced over thirty productions - twenty two of them world premieres. Michel Hausmann also started Miami New Drama's educational program, which serves more than 8,000 students annually and provides online programming for people across the United States and internationally - offering master classes on a variety of different theater topics such as acting, playwriting, directing, and theater management.

== Biography ==
Hausmann is of Jewish descent, and was born and raised in Caracas, Venezuela. After graduating from Emerson College in Boston, Massachusetts with a BA in film, Hausmann returned to Caracas. Once back, he founded his first theater company, Palo de Agua, in 2003 alongside executive producer, Yair Rosemberg. Under their leadership, Palo de Agua became an award-winning theater company. Its production of Jesus Christ Superstar was seen by over 170,000 people. Following an attack by the Venezuelan government during the production, Michel Hausmann left Venezuela and moved to New York City to pursue an MFA in Directing at Columbia University. While at Columbia, Hausmann studied under renowned directors such as Anne Bogart and Gregory Mosher, among others. His thesis play, The Golem of Havana, played at La MaMa Experimental Theatre Club in 2013 and went on to have its world premiere at Barrington Stage Company in 2014.

In 2016, Hausmann relocated to Miami, Florida and produced The Golem of Havana at the Colony Theatre in Miami Beach; it was Miami New Drama's debut production. Miami New Drama is the second theater company founded by Michel Hausmann. He co-founded it with playwright, director, and medal of the arts winner, Moisés Kaufman. In 2020, Miami New Drama produced Seven Deadly Sins: Temptation in the Magic City, a series of seven short plays around the theme of the seven deadly sins, shown in vacant Miami storefronts along Lincoln Road while the limited audience, socially distanced due to Coronavirus restrictions, watches and listens via headphones. The production was directed by Hausmann and authored by playwrights Hilary Bettis, Nilo Cruz, Moisés Kaufman, Rogelio Martinez, Dael Orlandersmith, Carmen Palaez, and Aurin Squire.

In 2024, he put together an immersive theater experience in collaboration with (and inside of) the Rubell Museum, titled The Museum Plays, a collection of short-format plays playing off of a set of paintings from the Rubell Museum's collection, each one performed in the same room as the piece that inspired it. Hausman commissioned the plays to playwrights Hannah Benitez, Harley Elias, Rogelio Martinez, Carmen Pelaez, Marco Ramirez and Aurin Squire, to be inspired by specific works by Alfonso Gonzalez Jr., Jenna Gribbon, Glenn Ligon, Kaari Upson and Kehinde Wiley.

== Stage credits ==
=== With Miami New Drama ===
- The Golem of Havana (Book by Hausmann himself, music by Salomon Lerner, and lyrics by Len Schiff) - Director and Producer
- A Special Day (in co-production with The Play Company) - Producer
- Terror (Directed by Gregory Mosher) - Producer
- The first multilingual production of Our Town - Director and Producer
- The Elaborate Entrance of Chad Deity (In co-production with Asolo Rep) - Producer
- Hilary Bettis' Queen of Basel - Director and Producer
- Moises Kaufman's The Album (in co-production with Tectonic Theater Project) - Producer
- Puras Cosas Maravillosas (starring Erika de la Vega) - Director and Producer
- Kemp Powers' One Night in Miami - Producer
- The world premiere of Carmen Pelaez's Fake - Producer
- The world premiere of Billy Corben and Aurin Squire's Confessions of a Cocaine Cowboy - Director and Producer
- The world premiere of Viva la Parranda - Producer
- The world premiere of Karin Valecillos' Gente Ociosa - Director and Producer
- The Bridge of San Luis Rey (Directed by and starring David Greenspan) - Producer
- The world premiere of Michael Leon's The Cubans - Producer
- The world premiere of A Wonderful World (Book by Aurin Squire, with music made famous by Louis Armstrong, directed by Christopher Renshaw) - Producer

=== Off-Broadway ===
- The 2013 production of The Golem Of Havana at La MaMa Experimental Theatre Club - Director
- Nilo Cruz'sThe Color Of Desire at Repertorio Español - Director
- Vassily Sigarev's Black Milk at Classic Stage Company- Director

=== With Palo de Agua ===
- The world premiere of Isaac Chocrón's Los Navegaos - Director
- The Venezuelan premiere of Gross Indecency: The Three Trials of Oscar Wilde - Co-director
- Fiddler on the Roof - Director and Translator
- The Producers - Director and Translator
- Jesus Christ Superstar - Director and Translator

== Awards ==
- New York Theatre Workshop 2050 Fellow
- Shubert Presidential Fellow
- IRNE Award (Nomination)
- Richard Rodgers Award (Finalist)
- Two-time Knight Foundation Arts Challenge Award Recipient

== Conflicts with the Venezuelan government ==
During Hausmann's 2009 production of Fiddler on the Roof, the Grand Marshal of Ayacucho Symphony Orchestra, funded in its entirety by the Venezuelan government of President Hugo Chávez, abandoned the production two weeks before the opening, citing that its participation on a "Jewish play" would threaten the funding they receive from the Venezuelan government, a vocal foe of Israel. The move was condemned by the Simon Wiesenthal Center and the Anti Defamation League. The production went forward, performed on a rooftop in Caracas with various musicians stepping up to play the score.

When preparing for a 2010 production of Jesus Christ Superstar in Caracas, Hausmann secured a sponsorship deal for US$300,000 (equivalent to $442,900 in 2025) with Research in Motion (RIM), makers of BlackBerry smartphones, and its cellular phone network partner, government-owned Movilnet. Leaked diplomatic cables revealed that, less than a month before opening night, the sponsorship pair added a clause stating that the production could not place advertising space – even with other cash – in a list of media outlets banned by RIM and Movilnet for being critical of the Chávez regime. Hausmann and producer Yair Rosemberg chose instead to cancel the RIM-Movilnet sponsorship deal, and went public with this information. When the production opened at the Central University of Venezuela, it was attacked with tear gas by masked assailants. While the rector of the university stated that the attack was a continuation of incidents targeting the university, Hausmann called it an example of Chávez' intimidation against any theatre group branded enemies of the state "because they seek to maintain their autonomy".
