= Gotham Chamber Opera =

Gotham Chamber Opera was a professional opera company located in New York City. The company was founded in 2000 under the name of the Henry Street Chamber Opera by Artistic Director Neal Goren and specialized in producing rarely performed chamber operas from the Baroque era to the present. In 2003, it changed its name to the Gotham Chamber Opera (GCO) after incorporating as an independent 501(c)(3) organization. Its Executive Director was Edward Barnes, who took over from David Bennett. It closed in 2015.

== History ==
=== Henry Street Chamber Opera ===
The company first presented the American premiere of Mozart's Il sogno di Scipione (1771), staged by Christopher Alden in 2001 at the Playhouse at the Abrons Arts Center, a 350-seat theater on the New Yorks's Lower East Side.

Soon after, the company produced a double bill of Henry Purcell's Dido and Aeneas (1689) and Darius Milhaud's Les malheurs d'Orphée (1924). Two more American premieres followed in November 2002 with Czech composer Bohuslav Martinů's 1928 Dada opera, Les larmes du couteau (Tears of the Knife), and his 1935 Hlas lesa (The Voice of the Forest).

=== Gotham Chamber Opera ===
After incorporating as a non-profit organization in 2003, the newly renamed Gotham Chamber Opera (GCO) presented the American premiere of Swiss composer Heinrich Sutermeister's 1935 Die schwarze Spinne (The Black Spider).

Gotham's February 2005 production of Handel's Arianna in Creta played to full houses and drew favorable reviews. That summer, in a co-production with the Lincoln Center Festival and Spoleto Festival USA, the company performed Ottorino Respighi's fantastical La bella dormente nel bosco (Sleeping Beauty in the Woods), featuring the puppetry of Basil Twist. In the spring of 2006, Benjamin Britten's only comedy, Albert Herring, received its first professional staging in New York in more than 30 years, and in the winter of 2007, Rossini's Il signor Bruschino received its first major professional New York staging in more than half a century.

In the 2007/08 season, the company presented New York City's first staged production of Astor Piazzolla's 1968 tango opera María de Buenos Aires, as well as Scenes of Gypsy Life, a fully staged evening of song cycles by Janáček and Dvořák, and Ariadne Unhinged, a retelling of the Ariadne myth through the music of Monteverdi, Haydn, and Schoenberg. And in 2009, Mark Morris directed the U.S. stage premiere of Haydn's L'isola disabitata.

Gotham presented Haydn's Il mondo della luna at the Hayden Planetarium of the American Museum of Natural History in January 2010. The production, staged by Diane Paulus, featured NASA-generated moon travel projections on the planetarium's 360-degree dome.

In October 2010, GCO with Tectonic Theater Project presented the U.S. premiere of Xavier Montsalvatge's El gato con botas (Puss in Boots). The production was directed by Moisés Kaufman, with bunraku puppetry by the Blind Summit Theatre of London. The opera premiered at the New Victory Theater in New York City.

In November 2010, Gotham Chamber Opera, Music-Theatre Group and Opera Philadelphia announced the commission of a new American opera, Dark Sisters, composed by Nico Muhly with a libretto by Stephen Karam, to be conducted by Neal Goren, and directed by Rebecca Taichman. The world premiere took place in November 2011 at the Gerald W. Lynch Theater at John Jay College in New York, one of the first works to be presented at the theater following the creation of a new lobby at the space. Dark Sisters was also presented in June 2012 as part of Opera Philadelphia's chamber opera series at the Perelman Theater in the Kimmel Center for the Performing Arts. Gotham scheduled two workshops and orchestra readings, in November 2010 and March 2011, for the new work.

Gotham Chamber Opera included appearances on WNYC, displays at Bergdorf Goodman and Prada SoHo, annual collaborations with the Gagosian Gallery, and performances in various Manhattan venues. The company's activities also included school residencies, workshops, and free rehearsals.

GCO was a member of the professional organization OPERA America.

On October 1, 2015, Gotham Chamber Opera announced it would close due to previously undiscovered debts.

== Productions ==
- 2001: Il sogno di Scipione (1771) by Wolfgang Amadeus Mozart, directed by Christopher Alden at The Abrons Art Center (U.S. stage premiere)
- 2002: Dido and Aeneas (1689) by Henry Purcell, directed by Laurence Dale at The Abrons Arts Center
- 2002: Les malheurs d'Orphée (1924) by Darius Milhaud, directed by Laurence Dale at The Abrons Arts Center
- 2002: Les larmes du couteau (1928) by Bohuslav Martinů, directed by Ned Canty at The Abrons Arts Center (U.S. premiere)
- 2002: Hlas lesa (1935) by Bohuslav Martinů, directed by Ned Canty at The Abrons Arts Center (U.S. premiere)
- 2004: Die schwarze Spinne (1935) by Heinrich Sutermeister, directed by Robin Guarino at The Abrons Arts Center (U.S. premiere)
- 2005: Arianna in Creta (1733) by George Frideric Handel, directed by Christopher Alden at The Abrons Arts Center (U.S. stage premiere)
- 2005: La bella dormente nel bosco (1922) by Ottorino Respighi, directed by Basil Twist at Lincoln Center (U.S. stage premiere)
- 2006: Albert Herring (1947) by Benjamin Britten, directed by David Schweizer at The Abrons Arts Center
- 2007: Il signor Bruschino (1813) by Gioachino Rossini, directed by Robin Guarino at The Abrons Arts Center
- 2007: María de Buenos Aires (1968) by Astor Piazzolla directed by David Parsons at Jack H. Skirball Center for the Performing Arts, New York University
- 2007: Scenes of Gypsy Life a cautionary tale featuring music of Antonín Dvořák (1880) and Leoš Janáček (1919), directed by Eric Einhorn at the Morgan Library
- 2008: Ariadne Unhinged, music by Claudio Monteverdi (1608), Joseph Haydn (1789) and Arnold Schoenberg (1912) directed by Karole Armitage at The Playhouse, Abrons Arts Center (World premiere)
- 2009: L'isola disabitata (1779) by Joseph Haydn, directed by Mark Morris at the Gerald W. Lynch Theater at John Jay College (New York stage premiere)
- 2010: Il mondo della luna (1777) by Joseph Haydn, directed by Diane Paulus at the Hayden Planetarium
- 2010: El gato con botas (1946) by Xavier Montsalvatge, directed by Moisés Kaufman at the New Victory Theater (U.S. stage premiere)
- 2011: Dark Sisters (2013) by Nico Muhly (World premiere)
- 2012: Il sogno di Scipione by Wolfgang Amadeus Mozart, directed by Christopher Alden at the Gerald W. Lynch Theater at John Jay College (10th anniversary production)
- 2012: Gotham @ (Le) Poisson Rouge: Orientale (Monteverdi, Rameau, Delibes and others)
- 2012: Eliogabalo (1668) by Francesco Cavalli, staged at The Box Soho
- 2012: La hija de Rappaccini (1991) by Daniel Catán
- 2013: La descente d'Orphée aux enfers (1686) by Marc-Antoine Charpentier
- 2013: Baden-Baden 1927, music by Milhaud, Toch, Hindemith and Weill
- 2013: Il combattimento di Tancredi e Clorinda (1624) by Monteverdi; I Have No Stories to Tell You by Lembit Beecher (World premiere)
- 2013: The Raven by Toshio Hosokawa (based on the poem of that name by Edgar Allan Poe) (U.S. premiere)
