= Theatre Royal Stratford East =

Theatre in London, England

Stratford East

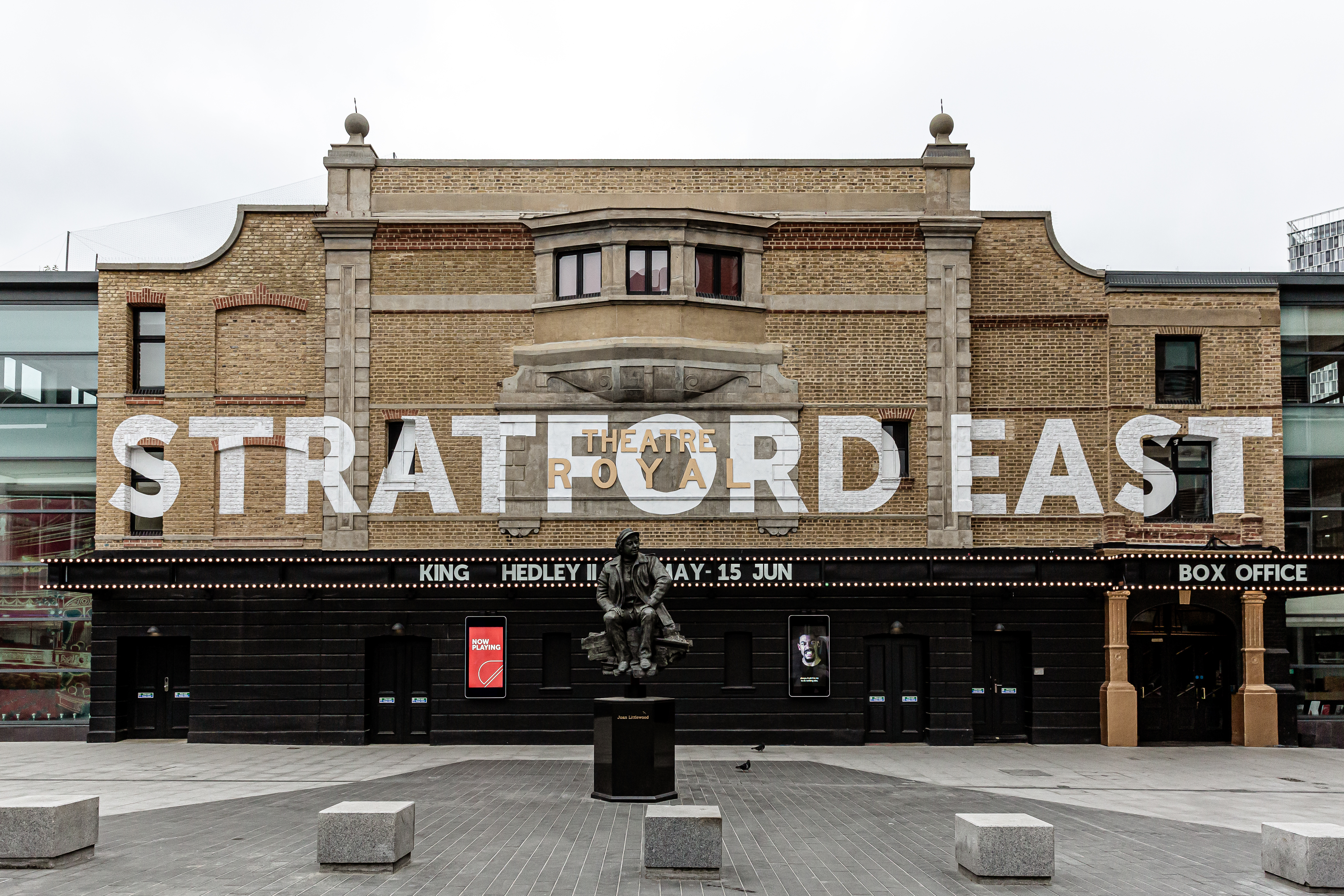
- Front of Stratford East, with statue of Joan Littlewood
- Interactive map of Stratford East
- Location: Stratford, London, E15; United Kingdom
- Coordinates: 51.542730°N 0.000800°E
- Owner: Pioneer Theatres Limited
- Capacity: 460 on three levels
- Type: Non-profit producing theatre
- Designation: Grade II* listed
- Current use: Touring and own productions
- Public transit: Stratford

Construction
- Opened: 17 December 1884; 141 years ago
- Renovated: 1902: Frank Matcham, 1984, 2001
- Rebuilt: 1884/1891: Buckle
- Architect: James George Buckle

Website
- stratfordeast.com

Stratford East, formerly known as Theatre Royal Stratford East, is a 460-seat Victorian producing theatre in Stratford in the London Borough of Newham. Since 1953, it has been the home of the Theatre Workshop company, famously associated with director Joan Littlewood, whose statue is outside the theatre.

== History ==
The theatre was designed by architect James George Buckle, and commissioned by Charles Dillon, né Silver, adoptive son of the actor-manager Charles Dillon (died 1881) in 1884. It is the architect's only surviving work, built on the site of a wheelwright's shop on Salway Road, close to the junction with Angel Lane. It opened on 17 December 1884 with a revival of Richelieu by Edward Bulwer-Lytton. Two years later, Dillon sold it to Albert O'Leary Fredericks, his sister's brother-in-law and one of the original backers of the scheme.

In 1887 the theatre was renamed Theatre Royal and Palace of Varieties and side extensions were added in 1887. The stage was enlarged in 1891, by the original architect. In 1902, Frank Matcham undertook minor improvements to the entrance and foyer. The theatre reverted to its Theatre Royal Stratford East ('TRSE') name in 1914. A fire on the stage on August Bank Holiday Monday of 1921 did considerable damage to the rear of the theatre. As the fire happened at midnight, the safety curtain was lowered, saving the auditorium, which retains many of its original features. The theatre was closed until January 1922.

The Fredericks family continued to manage the theatre until 1932, although after the World War I, the theatre fell into financial difficulties, opening only irregularly after 1926. The proscenium is surmounted by the letters "FF", commemorating the association with the Fredericks – possibly Frederick Fredericks, the husband of Dillon's sister, and a successful actor in his own right. Theatre superstition has it that should the letters ever be removed, the theatre will crumble.

TRSE closed in 1938 and remained closed until 1943. Revues were then briefly tried, but failed, and again the theatre was closed until October 1946. Taken over by David Horne, it briefly became a successful playhouse including the legendary premiere of Patrick Hamilton's Gaslight, with Sybil Thorndike and Derek Bond – which ran for six months and was the theatre's first transfer to the West End. The theatre closed again in December 1949.

Audio description of the theatre by Barbara Windsor.

In late 1950, a touring company presented the Christmas pantomime, Alice in Wonderland. Highly experimental, its success was by no means guaranteed or uniform throughout the tour. "They'll lynch us", recalls Sven Stahl. "I still have nightmares about Alice in Wonderland at Barnsley and the miners throwing pennies at John Blanshard." The company were to return, as the Theatre Workshop in 1953, with artistic director Joan Littlewood and take over the theatre.

The theatre came under threat with the construction of the Stratford shopping centre in the 1970s, but was saved by a public campaign and protected in June 1972 by English Heritage with a Grade II* listing. Money remained short, and the manager, Gerry Raffles, only managed redecoration and replacements as cash became available. In 2001, following a successful Heritage Lottery Fund bid, all of the theatre's front of house and backstage areas were refurbished as part of the Olympiad's Stratford Cultural Quarter project.

In 1990 the musical Five Guys Named Moe became a huge hit, transferring to the West End and winning the Olivier Award for Best Entertainment. The show has been produced all over the world, including Broadway, and continues to be revived regularly. In 2004The Big Life became the first Black British musical to transfer to London's West End, where it played at the Apollo Theatre. In 2005, the theatre produced a musical version of the cult Jamaican film The Harder They Come – famous for its reggae soundtrack, which also transferred to the West End. This production was written by the film director Perry Henzel and was one of the most successful productions in the theatre's history.

In 2016, the theatre rebranded to simply Stratford East moving into a new contemporary age.

== Artistic directors ==
=== Joan Littlewood (1953–1974) ===
The Theatre Royal became famous under the management of Gerry Raffles (1928–1975), who worked with director Joan Littlewood on such productions as A Taste of Honey and Oh, What a Lovely War!. In 1975, Raffles died of diabetes, and in 1979 a devastated Joan Littlewood moved to France, never to direct again. Notable names to get their break at TRSE include Richard Harris, Murray Melvin, Barbara Windsor, Victor Spinetti, Brian Murphy, Avis Bunnage, Harry H Corbett, Yootha Joyce, composer/lyricist Lionel Bart, and writer Shelagh Delaney.

Michael Caine was famously told by Littlewood: "P*ss off to Shaftesbury Avenue. You will only ever be a star. "

=== Ken Hill (1974–1975) ===
The playwright and director Ken Hill, a protégé of Joan Littlewood, took over as artistic director after she moved to France, prompted by the death of her partner, Gerry Raffles. After his short tenure as artistic director, Hill continued to work with TRSE until his death, most notably in raucous musicals. They included The Invisible Man which transferred from TRSE to the Vaudeville Theatre in the West End in 1993 and Zorro! The Musical which opened two weeks after Hill's death in 1995. Notable productions by Ken Hill at the TRSE include On Your Way, Riley! by Alan Plater, Scrape Off the Black by Tunde Ikoli, and My Girl by Barrie Keeffe.

=== Maxwell Shaw (1975–1977) ===
Maxwell Shaw, another member of the original Theatre Workshop, was a character actor on both stage and film, most notably in The Oblong Box and Start The Revolution Without Me. He opened his tenure at the TRSE with his own adaptation of a Georges Feydeau farce Out of Practice.

=== Clare Venables (1977–1979) ===
Clare Venables was artistic director from 1977 to 1979. She went on to run the Crucible Theatre Sheffield from 1981 to 1992, was a founding director of the Actors' Centre and a member of the Arts Council Drama panel. She was principal of the BRIT School of Performing Arts and Technology in Croydon from 1995 to 1999; and director of education of the Royal Shakespeare Company from 1991 until her death in 2003. Notable Venables productions included Old King Cole, The Silver Tassie, The Funniest Man in the World, and Sisters.

=== Philip Hedley (1979–2004) ===
Philip Hedley, who had worked as an assistant to Joan Littlewood for some years, took over the artistic directorship of the Theatre Royal from Clare Venables in 1979. He provided traditional entertainment in style of old music hall variety shows on Sunday evenings while seeking to engage with new Asian and Black audiences, as the local demographic changed. The theatre continued Littlewood's agenda to portray and express the experience of local people in East London.

In 1999, he began the Musical Theatre Initiatives scheme to encourage new writing in musical theatre. The final show he produced at Stratford East, The Big Life, was the first black British musical to go to the West End. In 2004, after 25 years as artistic director, he retired.

=== Kerry Michael (2004–2017) ===
Kerry Michael joined Stratford East in 1997, as an associate director, becoming artistic director in September 2004. His manifesto is to bring London's new communities to the stage, and portray their experiences as second and third generation emigrants. His debut play as artistic director was The Battle of Green Lanes by Cosh Omar, set amongst London's Cypriot society. He directed the hit musicals The Harder They Come (at Theatre Royal Stratford East and then transferred to The Barbican and the West End's Playhouse Theatre) and also Come Dancing by Ray Davies and Paul Sirett. In 2007, Pied Piper won the Olivier Award for Outstanding Achievement in an Affiliate Theatre, as did Cora Bissett's play Roadkill. in 2011. The theatre was nominated again in 2014 with their production of Oh! What a Lovely War!, a revival of the Joan Littlewood classic. Michael also directed the annual pantomime and was again nominated for an Olivier Award for Cinderella.

In 2012 Stratford East, 'fast becoming one of the UK's most innovative and interactive theatres', launched its Open Stage Project, enabling people to participate with everything from programming ideas to working on productions. 2014 productions at Stratford East included David Baddiel's musical The Infidel, co-directed by Kerry Michael and David Baddiel. The 2016 season included Hotel Cerise, an adaptation of Anton Chekhov's The Cherry Orchard by Bonnie Greer.

In 2016 Kerry Michael expanded Stratford East across the square to Gerry's, a new cafe and an 80-seater studio. Kerry Michael stepped down as artistic director in 2017.

=== Nadia Fall (2017–2025) ===
A director and playwright, Nadia Fall has worked extensively at the Royal National Theatre, directing shows including Chewing Gum Dreams, Our Country's Good and Home – which she also wrote.

Fall has also worked with London's Hampstead Theatre and Bush Theatre, where she directed Taylor Mac's Hir.

Fall's first season (2018–2019) opened with an adaptation of Lope de Vega's Fuenteovejuna by April De Angelis called The Village featuring Anya Chalotra and Art Malik. The season also included the UK premiere of The Wolves by Sarah DeLappe, Ballet Black, pantomime Sleeping Beauty, Frantic Assembly's The Unreturning by Anna Jordan, a revival of Peter Shaffer's Equus directed by Ned Bennett and co-produced with English Touring Theatre. The critically acclaimed production transferred to the West End in summer 2019 playing at Trafalgar Studios. Other shows included Pilot Theatre's touring show Noughts & Crosses (novel series), an adaptation of Malorie Blackman's novel by Sabrina Mahfouz, August Wilson's play King Hedley II, directed by Fall and starring Lenny Henry, Cherrelle Skeete, Leo Wringer, Martina Laird, Dexter Flanders and Aaron Pierre as Hedley. The season ended with a co-production with English National Opera for Benjamin Britten's community opera Noye's Fludde directed by Lyndsey Turner and featured different community groups and schools across Newham and East London.

Equus received three 2020 Offies, including Best Production, Best Director (Ned Bennett) and Best Lighting Design (Jessica Hung Han Yun).

Fall's second season (2019–2020) opened with Katori Hall's Our Lady of Kibeho and included the return of Ballet Black, pantomime Dick Whittington, Eclipse Theatre's new play The Gift by Janice Okoh and Frantic Assembly's 25th anniversary play I Think We Are Alone by Sally Abbott and co-directed by Kathy Burke and Scott Graham. The rest of the season was cancelled due to the COVID-19 pandemic. This included a new verbatim play by Nadia Fall Welcome To Iran in co-production with the National Theatre, an adaptation of Charles Dickens' Oliver Twist by Bryony Lavery for Ramps on the Moon and a revival of Roy Williams' seminal play Sucker Punch, directed by Roy Alexander Weise.

The productions Noye's Fludde and Our Lady of Kibeho were nominated for Olivier Awards, winning Outstanding Achievement in Opera for The Children's Ensemble in Noye's Fludde.

On 1 October 2024, it was announced that Lisa Spirling will replace Fall in 2025.

=== Lisa Spirling (2025-) ===
Lisa Spirling's first season as Artistic Director started with the UK Premiere of Moisés Kaufman and Amanda Gronich's play, Here There Are Blueberries. This will be followed by a revival of the play Choir Boy by Tarell Alvin McCraney. Later in 2026, Spirling will make her directorial debut at the venue with Bloodsport: After Helen of Troy by Ava Pickett.

== Controversies ==
In May 2023 the theatre scheduled a "black only" series of performances later copied around London by a number of different theatres. This was widely criticised by many members of the public and a variety of media outlets, while widely supported by others. The events received criticism for asking all white members of the public to kindly refrain from attending. The introduction of the performances were described by the Tory Bedfordshire Police and Crime Commissioner (PCC) Festus Akinbusoye, as a "poor and dangerous precedent." Opinion was widely divided, some labelling the events progressive while others labelling them racist, separatist and hypocritical. However, the cabinet office later stated that under the 2010 Equality Act, the exclusion of white people is currently and entirely fully legal. The theatre defended the performance approach robustly.

Nadia Fall, the theatre's artistic director, defended the performances: "I understand that this initiative isn't going to chime with everyone, and that's OK; that's why there are 28 performances that aren't a Black Out night. No one is excluded from attending and during the course of the show's run we want audiences from all backgrounds to enjoy and discuss this thought-provoking new play."

== Bibliography ==
- Coren, Michael – Theatre Royal: 100 Years of Stratford East – Quartet, 1984 ISBN 0-7043-2474-1
