= A Wonderful World (musical) =

Stage musical based on the life of Louis Armstrong

- The Louis Armstrong Musical
- Broadway promotional poster
- Music: Various Artists
- Lyrics: Various Artists
- Book: Aurin Squire; Story by Christopher Renshaw; Andrew Delaplaine
- Basis: The life of Louis Armstrong
- Premiere: December 4, 2021: Colony Theatre, Miami
- Productions: 2021 Miami New Drama; 2023 New Orleans, Chicago; 2024 Broadway

A Wonderful World - The Louis Armstrong Musical is a jukebox stage musical with a book by Aurin Squire. The show features a score of music originally performed by Louis Armstrong and others, with orchestrations and arrangements by Branford Marsalis. The show was conceived originally by Christopher Renshaw and Andrew Delaplaine and is directed by Renshaw with choreography by Rickey Tripp.

The musical tells an autobiographical account of the life of jazz musician Louis Armstrong (1901–1971), from the perspective of the four wives he had during his lifetime, Daisy Parker, Lillian Hardin, Alpha Smith, and Lucille Wilson. The title comes from the song "What a Wonderful World", originally released in 1967 and written by Bob Thiele and George David Weiss.

The show opened on Broadway at Studio 54 on November 11, 2024, following previews beginning a month earlier. The show closed on February 23, 2025. The production ran for 151 performances, including 31 previews.

== Production history ==
=== Miami New Drama (2020–2021) ===
The musical was commissioned by Michel Hausmann, artistic director of Miami New Drama. The project was developed and workshopped beginning in 2019 at Miami New Drama and was originally set to have its world premiere on March 5, 2020, running until April 5th, 2020. This production was cancelled due to the COVID-19 pandemic and rescheduled at the end of 2021, running from December 4, 2021, until January 16, 2022. Dionne Figgins was originally cast as Daisy Parker, while Lillian Hardin was originally played by Lana Gordon. The two roles were re-cast following the pandemic.

=== New Orleans and Chicago (2022–2023) ===
After the world premiere production, the musical was taken on the road to further workshop in New Orleans at the Saenger Theatre from October 1–8, 2023 and in Chicago at the Cadillac Palace Theatre October 13, 2023 through October 29, 2023. The musical held private readings in New York City in 2022 featuring James Monroe Iglehart as Armstrong, Krystal Joy Brown as Alpha Smith, Patrice Covington as Lucille Wilson, Jennie Harney-Fleming as Lillian Hardin, and Aisha Jackson as Daisy Parker.

=== Broadway (2024) ===
In February 2024, it was announced the show would transfer to Broadway later that fall, opening at Studio 54 on November 11, 2024 following previews beginning October 16, 2024. Vanessa Williams serves as a producer on the project and Iglehart reprised his starring role as well as co-directed with Christina Sajous, who originally played Daisy in Miami. Branford Marsalis was added as orchestrator. The show closed on February 23, 2025.

== Original cast and characters ==
| Character | Miami | Chicago | Broadway |
| Character | 2021 | 2023 | 2024 |
|---|---|---|---|
| Louis Armstrong | Juson Williams | James Monroe Iglehart | James Monroe Iglehart |
| Louis Armstrong | Juson Williams | James Monroe Iglehart | James T. Lane |
| Daisy Parker | Christina Sajous | Khalifa White | Dionne Figgins |
| Lillian Hardin | Allison Semmes | Jennie Harney-Fleming | Jennie Harney-Fleming |
| Alpha Smith | Nicole Henry | Brennyn Lark | Kim Exum |
| Lucille Wilson | Darlene Hope | Ta'Rea Campbell | Darlesia Cearcy |
| King Joe Oliver | Gavin Gregory | Gavin Gregory | Gavin Gregory |
| Joe Glaser / Morris Karnofsky | Stephen G. Anthony | Matt Wolpe | Jimmy Smagula |
| Stepin Fetchit / Lincoln Perry | Jason Holley | DeWitt Fleming Jr. | DeWitt Fleming Jr. |

== Musical numbers ==
=== Act 1 ===
- "Basin Street Blues" / "Bourbon Street Parade" - Company
- "Kiss of Fire" - Louis, Daisy
- "It's Tight Like That" - King Joe Oliver, Louis, Daisy, Ensemble
- "Kiss of Fire" (reprise) - Daisy
- "Up a Lazy River" - Banjo Ben
- "Avalon" - Louis and Company
- "Black and Blue" - Louis, Daisy, Lil, Alpha, Lucille
- "It Don't Mean a Thing" - King Joe Oliver, Ensemble
- "Do You Know What It Means to Miss New Orleans?" - King Joe Oliver, Louis
- "Got a Bran' New Suit" - Lil, Louis, King Joe Oliver
- "A Kiss to Build a Dream On" - Lil, Louis
- "Heebie Jeebies" - Louis, Lil, Ensemble
- "Dinah" - Louis
- "Tiger Rag" - Louis, Lil, Ensemble
- "You Rascal You" - Louis, Ensemble
- "Some of These Days" / "After You've Gone" - Lil, Daisy

=== Act 2 ===
- "Oh, When The Saints Go Marching In" - Louis, Crooner
- "Big Butter and Egg Man" - Alpha, Louis
- "When You're Smiling" - Louis, Lincoln Perry, Ensemble
- "Do You Know What It Means to Miss New Orleans?" - King Joe Oliver
- "Ain't No Sweet Man That's Worth the Salt of My Tears" - Alpha
- "I Double Dare You" - Lucille, Ensemble
- "Cheek to Cheek" - Louis, Lucille
- "That's My Home" - Lucille
- "Back O'Town Blues" - Louis
- "Star Spangled Banner" - Louis
- "Hello, Dolly" - Louis
- "St. James Infirmary" - Daisy, Lil, Alpha, Lucille
- "What a Wonderful World" - Louis, Daisy, Lil, Alpha, Lucille, Company

== Award and nomination ==
| Year | Award | Category | Nominee | Result |
|---|---|---|---|---|
| 2025 | Tony Awards | Best Performance by a Leading Actor in a Musical | James Monroe Iglehart | Nominated |
