= Diego Collado =

Diego Collado may refer to:

- Diego Collado (missionary) (1587–1638), Spanish Christian missionary
  - Diego Collado's Grammar of the Japanese Language, 1632 description of the Japanese language in Latin
- Diego Collado (footballer) (born 2001), Spanish footballer
