= Here There Are Blueberries =

2018 play by Moisés Kaufman and Amanda Gronich

Here There Are Blueberies
- Original Production Poster
- Written by: Moisés Kaufman and Amanda Gronich
- Based on: Photo Album collected by Karl-Friedrich Höcker
- Genre: Documentary theatre

Premiere
- Date: 2018
- Place: Colony Theatre, Miami, Florida
- Directed by: Moisés Kaufman

Here There Are Blueberries is a 2018 play by Moisés Kaufman and Amanda Gronich. The play was a 2024 finalist for the Pulitzer Prize for Drama.

== Summary ==
In 2007, a mysterious Nazi-era photo album, retrieved by a U.S. counterintelligence officer out of a trash can in 1946, arrives at the desk of Rebecca Erbelding, a U.S. Holocaust Memorial Museum archivist. Controversy ensues and the photo album makes headlines when a German businessman sees his own grandfather in one of the photographs online. The play's title is the English translation of the handwritten caption Hier gibt es Blaubeeren, accompanying photos of young women – employed at the Auschwitz concentration camp as auxiliaries – enjoying bowls of blueberries.

== Productions ==
The play, under the title The Album: Here There Be Blueberries premiered as a work in progress as part of Miami New Drama's 2017–18 season at the Colony Theatre in 2018.

The piece subsequently premiered at the La Jolla Playhouse in 2022. In 2023, the play was performed at the Shakespeare Theatre Company, in Washington, D.C.

The play made its Off-Broadway debut at the New York Theatre Workshop in 2024. The NYTW production received a Drama League Award nomination for Outstanding Production of a Play and an Outer Critics Circle Award nomination for Outstanding New Off-Broadway Play. In 2025, McCarter Theatre Center launched a national tour of the production, which then traveled to The Wallis Annenberg and Berkeley Rep.

The play had its UK premiere in 2026 at the Theatre Royal Stratford East. The play will have its Chicago premiere in April 2027 at the Northlight Theatre.

In August 2026, the play was announced for a Broadway run in the Barrymore Theatre starting in November 2026.

== Original casts and characters ==
Character	San Diego	Washington D.C.	Off-Broadway	Tour	London	Broadway
Character	2022	2023	2024	2025	2026	
Karl Höcker and others	Scott Barrow	Scott Barrow	Scott Barrow	Scott Barrow	Scott Barrow	Scott Barrow
Judy Cohen and others	Rosina Reynolds	Kathleen Chalfant	Kathleen Chalfant	Barbara Pitts	Geraldine Alexander	Kathleen Chalfant
Rebecca Erbelding and others	Elizabeth Stahlmann	Elizabeth Stahlmann	Elizabeth Stahlmann	Delia Cunningham	Philippine Velge	Delia Cunningham
Melita Maschmann and others	Jeanne Sakata	Erika Rose	Erika Rose	Jeanne Sakata	Kirsten Foster	Montego Glover
Charlotte Schünzel and others	Frances Uku	Nemuna Ceesay	Nemuna Ceesay	Nemuna Ceesay	Paksie Vernon	Michelle Beck
Tilman Taube and others	Charles Browning	Maboud Ebrahimzadeh	Jonathan Raviv	Luke Forbes	Clifford Samuel	Conrad Ricamora
Rainer Höss and others	Charlie Thurston	Charlie Thurston	Charlie Thurston	Marrick Smith	Arthur Wilson	Brandon Flynn
Peter Wirths and others	Grant James Varjas	Grant James Varjas	Grant James Varjas	Grant James Varjas	Os Leanse	Michael Cerveris

== Awards and nominations ==
=== 2024 Off-Broadway production ===
Year	Award	Category	Nominee	Result	Ref.
2024	Pulitzer Prize for Drama			Nominated	
2025	Outer Critics Circle Award	Outstanding New Off-Broadway Play		Nominated	
2025	Drama League Award	Outstanding Production of a Play		Nominated	
2025	Lucille Lortel Awards	Outstanding Play		Won	
2025	Lucille Lortel Awards	Outstanding Director	Moisés Kaufman	Nominated	
2025	Lucille Lortel Awards	Outstanding Ensemble	Scott Barrow, Nemuna Ceesay, Kathleen Chalfant, Jonathan Raviv, Erika Rose, Elizabeth Stahlmann, Charlie Thurston, Grant James Varjas	Nominated	
2025	Lucille Lortel Awards	Outstanding Scenic Design	Derek McLane	Nominated	
2025	Lucille Lortel Awards	Outstanding Projection Design	David Bengali	Won	

== See also ==
- The Zone of Interest - Jonathan Glazer's 2023 Academy Award-winning feature similar in content
