= Victoria Collado =

Cuban–American director

- Born: Miami, Florida
- Education: Florida International University
- Occupation: Director
- Writing career
- Genre: theatre

Victoria Collado is a Cuban–American director. She assistant directed John Leguizamo's Latin History for Morons on Broadway, and has directed for Repertorio Español, MCC Youth Company, Sheen Center, Juggerknot Theatre Company, and Miami New Drama among other institutions. Collado was named a 2018-2020 resident of the WP Lab at WP Theater. Other recent directorial credits include That Rebel That; El Cruce Sobre el Niagara; El Burlador de Sevilla; A Very Old Man With Enormous Wings; The Crocodile's Bite; Amparo; and The Cubans at the Colony Theatre. She holds a B.F.A. in Theatre from Florida International University.

== Amparo ==
Amparo, an immersive theatrical performance written by Vanessa Garcia (artist) and produced by Havana Club, is inspired by the true story of Cuba's Arechabala family. The work showcases Jose Arechabala's original arrival on Cuban soil, the family's founding of Havana Club Rum, and the Cuban government's eventual seizing of the company followed by the Arechabalas' forced exile. The show debuted to limited audiences in Miami and New York, and is expected to expand to greater audiences in 2019.
