= Amanda Gronich =

American playwright and screenwriter

Amanda Gronich is an American playwright and screenwriter. A long-time collaborator with the Tectonic Theater Project, she co-authored Here There Are Blueberries with Moisés Kaufman and is a co-creator of The Laramie Project, a play which later was turned into a film.

== Early life and education ==
Gronich attended New York University.

== Career ==
When Tectonic Theater Project was founded, Gronich became an early charter member. With Tectonic, she was a co-creator of The Laramie Project, a 2000 play about the murder of gay student Matthew Shepard in Laramie, Wyoming which has been performed internationally. In 2002, she was nominated for the Emmy Award for Outstanding Writing For A Miniseries, Movie Or A Dramatic Special for the film adaptation of the same name. She directed Tectonic's Toronto production of Gross Indecency: The Three Trials of Oscar Wilde.

Gronich and Moisés Kaufman co-wrote the documentary drama play Here There Are Blueberries, which was a 2024 finalist for the Pulitzer Prize for Drama. The play played off-Broadway at the New York Theatre Workshop in 2024 and will open on Broadway at the Barrymore Theater in November 2026.

Gronich is a lead series writer for National Geographic TV. Outside of playwriting and screenwriting, she teaches non-fiction storytelling at the City College of New York.
