= David Padilla (disambiguation) =

David Padilla (1927–2016) was a Bolivian general and politician.

David Padilla may also refer to:

- David Padilla (DJ) (1961–2020), American disc jockey
- David Noel Ramírez Padilla (1950–2025), Mexican author
