= Warsaw Ballroom =

Gay night club

Coordinates: 25.7869°N 80.1305°W

The Warsaw Ballroom, or more commonly referred to simply as "Warsaw" was a gay night club located in South Beach, Florida, at Collins Avenue and Espanola Way. It had previously borne that name when it was a dance club for seniors. Then it changed hands, becoming the "Ovo" and the "China Club" before reverting again to the "Warsaw," but this time as a gay club.

In 1989 Andrew Delaplaine took over the lease on what had been the China Club and renamed the club the "Warsaw Ballroom".

In 1989 David Padilla was offered the resident DJ spot at the reincarnated Ovo, which would soon become (Warsaw Ballroom). The Warsaw Ballroom went out of business in 1999 and Jerry's Famous Deli replaced it.
