= Hilary Bettis =

American dramatist

- Born: 1985 or 1986 (age 40–41); South Carolina, United States
- Education: The Juilliard School
- Occupations: Playwright; screenwriter; producer
- Spouse: Bobby Moreno
- Writing career
- Genres: Dark comedy; docudrama; historical drama
- Notable works: 72 miles to go...; Queen of Basel; Alligator; The Ghosts of Lote Bravo; Blood & Dust
- Notable awards: Writers Guild of America Award for Drama Series
- Website: hilarybettiswriter.com

Hilary Bettis is a playwright, producer, and screenwriter.

== Life and career ==
She won the 2019 Writers Guild of America Award, and was nominated in 2018, for her work on the Emmy and Golden Globe winning series The Americans on FX, which she wrote on for the final two seasons. Her play, 72 miles to go... was a 2019 finalist for the prestigious Blackburn Prize, and was announced to be produced Off-Broadway by Roundabout Theatre in the winter of 2020.

She is a graduate of the Lila Acheson Wallace Playwright Fellowship at The Juilliard School. Bettis has received fellowships, workshops, and residencies at the Roundabout, Alley All New Festival, Orlando Shakes PlayFest, Bay Area Playwrights Festival, O'Neill National Playwrights Conference, 2050 Fellow at New York Theatre Workshop, John N. Wall Fellow at Sewanee Writers' Conference, SPACE at Ryder Farm, Writer-In-Residence at Cape Cod Theatre Project, La Jolla Playhouse, New York Foundation for the Arts Fellow, Playwrights' Week at The Lark, NNPN's National Showcase of New Plays, Audrey Residency at New Georges, Two River Theater, Great Plains Theatre Conference, WildWind Lab at Texas Tech, The Kennedy Center/NNPN MFA Workshop, and a Sloan/EST Commission. She was also commissioned by Miami New Drama to write Queen of Basel, which ran at the Colony Theatre from April 14, 2018 - May 6, 2018.

She has had plays recognized by The Kilroys every year since its inception. She has been a Runner-Up for the Alliance Theatre's Kendeda Award, Nuestras Voces National Playwriting Competition, American Blues Theater's Blue Ink Award, New America Fellowship, and the Leah Ryan Prize. Bettis is a member of the Dorothy Strelsin New American Writers Group at Primary Stages, Ensemble Studio Theater, a Usual Suspect at NYTW, an Affiliated Artist at New Georges, The Kilroys, and a member of the WGA.

As a screenwriter, Bettis has written and produced three short films. B'Hurst, The Iron Warehouse and Connor which she also directed. She has developed and sold multiple original TV shows, and was currently developing a project at FX with Propgate, and AMC. And she is an alumna of the prestigious Sundance Institute Episodic TV Lab.

She grew up in rural Colorado and lives in Brooklyn, NY with her husband, actor Bobby Moreno. Her grandfather was of Mexican descent.

== Writing and producing credits ==
=== Full-length plays ===
- 72 miles to go...
- Queen of Basel
- American Girls
- Mexico
- Alligator
- Dakota Atoll
- The Ghosts of Lote Bravo
- The History of American Pornography
- Blood & Dust
- Falcon Girls

=== Short plays ===
- The Mud Hole
- Two Lovers
- The Bronze Serpent

=== Short films ===
Year	Title	Writer	Producer	Notes
2009	B'Hurst	Yes	Executive	Acting role:Sam
2011	The Iron Warehouse	Yes	Yes	
2021	Connor	Yes	Yes	Also director

=== Television ===
Year	Title	Writer	Executive producer	Notes
2017–18	The Americans	Yes (2)	No	Also story editor
2020	Grand Army	Yes (1)	Co-producer	
2022	The Dropout	Yes (1)	Producer	
2026	The Dutton Ranch	Yes (2)	Co-executive	
2026	Lucky	Yes (2)	Supervising	
