= Aurin Squire =

American dramatist

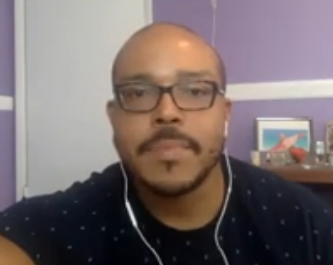
- In a HowlRound online discussion in 2020
- Born: Opa-locka, Florida, US
- Education: Northwestern University; School of Drama; Juilliard School
- Occupations: Playwright, screenwriter, reporter

Aurin Squire is an African-American playwright, screenwriter, and reporter. He has written numerous plays, while his reporting has appeared in The New Republic, Talking Points Memo, Chicago Tribune, Miami Herald, and ESPN, among other outlets.

== Early life and education ==
Born and raised in Opa-locka, Florida, Squire graduated from Northwestern University with a bachelor's in radio/TV/film, the School of Drama at The New School with an MFA in playwriting, and the Juilliard School with a graduate diploma in playwriting. He then worked as a professional journalist for the Chicago Tribune and the Miami Herald. In his senior year, Shadows in the Light, an epic play about Cuban immigrants in Miami, was produced by the ETA Theatre in Chicago. At Juilliard he was in the school's playwriting fellowship while working for The New Republic and Talking Points Memo as a journalist.

== Playwriting ==
Aurin Squire wrote the book for the Tony-nominated Broadway musical "A Wonderful World" which ran at Studio 54 in the 2024-2025 season. Many of Squire's plays revolve around multiracial societies in transition or America's changing cultural make-up. His work reflects the Latino, African, Caribbean, African-American, and Jewish cultures he grew up around in South Florida.

Squire's plays like "Don't Smoke in Bed" and "Obama-ology" premiered in London at Finborough Theatre before having runs in Chicago, Los Angeles, and Houston. His dark comedy about his childhood adoration of pop culture, "Defacing Michael Jackson," was produced in Chicago and then in Miami at Miami New Drama.

His play Obama-ology was developed at The Juilliard School for the 2014 Playwrights Festival, before opening to critical acclaim in London's West-End at the Finborough Theatre, and then the Royal Academy of Dramatic Art (RADA).

Freefalling premiered at Barrington Stage, before receiving a second run at InspiraTO Theatre in Toronto.

Squire graduated from The Juilliard School in May 2015.

His play Fire Season premiered at the Seattle Public Theater in January 2019.

Squire was a co-writer for Confessions of a Cocaine Cowboy a world-premiere documentary theatre piece based on Billy Corben's Cocaine Cowboys documentaries. The play was commissioned by Miami New Drama, an award-winning South Florida theater company, and ran at the Colony Theatre from March 7 to April 7, 2019.

Squire is the book writer for A Wonderful World, a world-premiere musical based on the life of Louis Armstrong, and told from the perspective of the musician's four wives. It was part of Miami New Drama's 2019–2020 season at the Colony Theatre, but as of July 2020, the musical was postponed. It has since reopened with a run from December 4, 2021 through January 16, 2022. The show will debut on Broadway in 2024.

== Multimedia projects ==
In recent years Squire's work has expanded into other media, including online video. He has written and produced a viral video series for the gay social and dating app Mister. The series includes Evil Twink and Boyfriend Shopping, satirizing the unrealistic and juvenile expectations of the gay dating scene.

The following year Squire was hired by installation art company Local Project and wrote the script Dreams of Freedom for the National Museum of American Jewish History in Philadelphia. Dreams is an interactive multimedia piece based on interviews of Jewish immigrants coming to America.

In October 2012, Squire ran the Vote It Forward Festival, promoting a competition that awarded $500–$1000 in prizes to the best voting-related videos.

He has also ghostwritten novels and memoirs and been published in online cultural journals such as Racialicious.

== Television/film ==
Aurin Squire was a staff writer on the CBS political satire BrainDead that premiered over the summer of 2016. He was a story editor and writer on the first season of the hit NBC drama This Is Us, and was a co executive producer on the CBS dramas The Good Fight and Evil.

Prior to TV writing, he was hired to ghostwrite and adapt novels into screenplays for New York indie film companies like Moxie Pictures.

== Acclaim ==
Many of Squire's plays have received enthusiastic reviews and revivals, among them To Whom it May Concern, which ran off-Broadway in 2009, Match Me, produced by the New York International Fringe Festival in 2005. His writing has been called "a true gem that deserves to be set apart from the rest" by The Drama Review, "brilliant" and "thoroughly entertaining" by Show Business Weekly, and "engaging and provocative" by critic Martin Denton.

His dark comedy To Whom It May Concern premiered at the Abingdon Theatre and won the Fresh Fruit Festival awards for best play and best playwright. To Whom It May Concern was also produced off-Broadway in 2009 at the Arclight Theatre with a cast including: Israel Gutierrez, Matthew Alford, Nicholas Reilly, and Carmelo Ferro.

Squire wrote the book for the children's musical Matthew Takes Mannahatta, called "refreshingly clever" and a "cheerful tribute to our multiracial, multicultural America" by The New York Times.

Squire has won several awards for his docudramas on Jewish issues, including Spanish Jewish families who fled the Inquisition and European Jewish immigrants who came to America. Dreams of Freedom won a Core 77 Design Award, NMAJ's Communication Award, and an AIGA Design Effectiveness Award.

His short drama Freefalling won the Fiat Lux Play Award from the Catholic Church. Squire is also a recipient of the Lila Acheson Wallace American Playwright Fellowship at The Juilliard School, and the two-time winner of the Le Comte du Nuoy Prize from Lincoln Center.

"Freefalling" also garnered first prize at InspiraTO Theatre's International Play Festival in Toronto and Lincoln Center's Act One Prize.

Squire was a Dramatists Guild of America playwriting fellow, an artist in residence at the Brooklyn Arts Exchange, and received a playwriting fellowship at National Black Theatre. He's also in the US Writers' Residency at Royal Court Theatre in London.

His play Obama-ology received rave reviews when it premiered at Finborough Theatre in London, before being remounted at the Royal Academy of Dramatic Arts in 2015. He returned to Finborough Theatre the following year with another sold-out hit with his dark comedy Don't Smoke in Bed.

In 2016, Squire won the Helen Merrill Award for Emerging Playwrights. In 2017, he was nominated for a WGA Award and Black Reel TV award for his writing on This is Us. In theatre, he won the Emerald Prize from Seattle Public Theatre for new works in American theatre.

In 2018, Squire's play Running on Fire was produced at Lee Street Theatre in North Carolina. Defacing Michael Jackson and Don't Smoke in Bed were produced in Chicago to critical acclaim. The following year, Squire's Fire Season premiered at Seattle Public Theatre in 2019. Squire also co-wrote Confessions of a Cocaine Cowboy, which world-premiered at Miami New Drama a few months later to sold-out crowds and became the highest grossing play in the theatre's history.

== Published plays ==
- Obama-ology (2015)
- Don't Smoke in Bed (2017)
- To Whom It May Concern (2018)
- Defacing Michael Jackson (2019)
- Defacing Michael jackson (short play)
- Freefalling
