= The Prime Gig =

2000 film by Gregory Mosher

- Theatrical release poster
- Directed by: Gregory Mosher
- Written by: William Wheeler
- Produced by: Gina Mingacci; Elliot Lewis Rosenblatt; Cary Woods
- Starring: Vince Vaughn; Julia Ormond; Ed Harris
- Cinematography: John A. Alonzo
- Edited by: James Y. Kwei
- Music by: David Robbins
- Production company: Independent Pictures
- Distributed by: New Line Cinema
- Release dates: September 1, 2000 (Venice); April 24, 2001 (LA); September 14, 2001 (USA)
- Running time: 98 minutes
- Country: United States
- Language: English

The Prime Gig is a 2000 film directed by Gregory Mosher, starring Vince Vaughn, Julia Ormond, and Ed Harris. The Prime Gig had its international premiere at the 57th Venice International Film Festival on September 1, 2000.

== Plot ==
Pendleton "Penny" Wise, a talented telemarketer who can sell almost anything over the phone, makes a fine living doing phone sales until the company that employs him goes bankrupt. Penny is approached by Caitlin Carlson, who is hiring telephone salesmen for Kelly Grant, a legend in telemarketing, but Penny is unsure if Grant's latest venture, selling shares in a gold mine, is legitimate.

== Cast ==
- Vince Vaughn as Pendelton "Penny" Wise
- Julia Ormond as Caitlin Carlson
- Ed Harris as Kelly Grant
- Rory Cochrane as Joel
- Wallace Shawn as Gene
- Stephen Tobolowsky as Mick
- George Wendt as Archie
- Jeannetta Arnette as Cheryl
- Shishir Kurup as Sujat
- Harper Roisman as Harry
- J.J. Johnston as Lloyd
- Tom Wright as Marvin Sanders
- Romany Malco as Zeke
- Brian George as Nasser
- Amber Benson as Batgirl

== Release ==
The Prime Gig had its international premiere at the 57th Venice International Film Festival on September 1, 2000, screening in the "Cinema of the Present" section. The film then had screenings at the Los Angeles Film Festival in April 2001, and the BFI London Film Festival later that autumn. The picture's theatrical rights were ultimately acquired by Fine Line Features, which gave the film a limited theatrical release in the United States on September 14, 2001. It was released directly to DVD in September 2001.
