= David Greenspan =

American actor and playwright (born 1956)

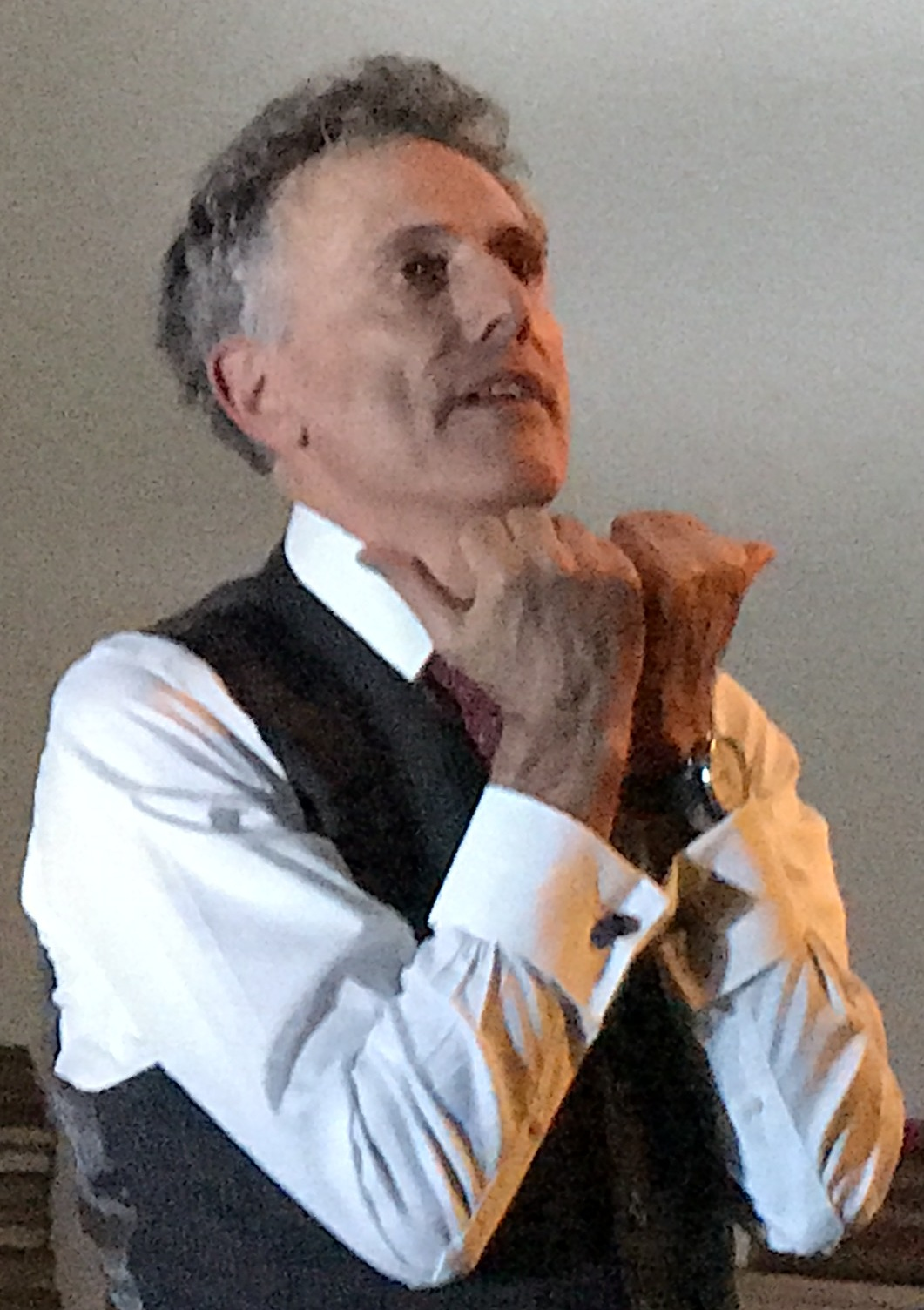
- Greenspan in 2017
- Born: 1956 (age 69–70); Los Angeles, California, U.S.
- Occupations: Stage actor, playwright
- Partner: William Kennon

David Greenspan (born 1956) is an American actor and playwright. He is the recipient of six Obie Awards, including an award in 2010 for Sustained Achievement.

== Life ==
Greenspan was born in 1956 in Los Angeles, California. He holds a B.A. in drama from the University of California, Irvine. He lives in New York City with his long-time partner, painter William Kennon.

== Career ==
When Greenspan was awarded the Herb Alpert Award by the California Institute of the Arts in 2002, the citation called him "A classicist in experimental clothing" whose "plays ask big questions about history, creation, sexual behavior, the complications of family and the very act of performing a play."

In 2009 he collaborated with Stephin Merritt of The Magnetic Fields in a musical adaptation of Neil Gaiman's Coraline, under the direction of Leigh Silverman. In an interview with Lizzie Olesker in The Brooklyn Rail, Greenspan describes the musical: "We suggest things. Not like a large animated musical. There’s no amplification of our voices. We wanted something that was more direct and immediate as opposed to something coming out of a wall of sound."

In 2022, Greenspan was included in the book 50 Key Figures in Queer US Theatre, profiled in a chapter written by performance scholar Nick Salvato.

In 2026, Greenspan performed in a solo show titled I'm Assuming You Know David Greenspan. It was written by Mona Pirnot and produced by Atlantic Theater Company.

== List of works ==
=== Theater ===
- The Horizontal And The Vertical, world premiere HOME for Contemporary Theatre and Art, NYC, 1986
- Dig A Hole And Bury You Father, world premiere HOME for Contemporary Theatre and Art, NYC, 1987
- Jack, world premiere HOME for Contemporary Theatre and Art, NYC, 1987
- Principa, world premiere HOME for Contemporary Theatre and Art, NYC, 1988
- The Home Show Pieces, world premiere HOME for Contemporary Theatre and Art, NYC, 1988
- 2 Samuel 11, Etc., world premiere HOME for Contemporary Theatre and Art, NYC, 1989
- Dead Mother, Or Shirley Not All In Vain, world premiere NYSF/Public Theater, 1991
- Dog In A Dancing School, world premiere Dance Theater Workshop, NYC, 1993
- Son Of An Engineer, world premiere HERE Arts Center, NYC, 1993
- Start From Scratch, world premiere New Renaissance @ Greenwich House, NYC, 1993
- Them, world premiere Actors Theater of Louisville, 1993
- Only Beauty, reading NYSF/The Public Theater, NYC, 1997
- Five Frozen Embryos, world premiere New York Fringe Festival, 2002
- She Stoops To Comedy, world premiere Playwrights Horizons, NYC, 2003
- The Argument, world premiere Target Margin Theater, NYC, 2007
- Old Comedy From Aristophanes' Frogs, world premiere Target Margin Theater, NYC, 2008
- Coraline, world premiere Manhattan Class Company, NYC, 2009
- The Myopia, an epic burlesque of tragic proportion, world premiere The Foundry Theatre, NYC, 2010
- Go Back To Where You Are, world premiere Playwrights Horizons, NYC, 2011
- Jump, world premiere Under The Radar Festival - NYSF/Public Theater, NYC, 2011
- Jonas, world premiere Transport Group, NYC, 2011
- I'm Looking For Helen Twelvetrees, world premiere Abrons Arts Center, NYC 2015
- The Bridge of San Luis Rey, world premiere Two River Theater, Red Bank, NJ, 2018

== Performance credits ==
=== Theater ===
- The Bridge of San Luis Rey (2019), Miami New Drama at the Colony Theatre as "Uncle Pio" (also Director)
- Cute Activist (2018), Bushwick Starr as "Landlorde"
- Strange Interlude, Transport Group (solo performance), NYC 2017
- Punk Rock (2014) MCC Theater as "Dr. Richard Harvey"
- A Midsummer Night's Dream (2012) Classic Stage Company as "Francis Flute"
- Go Back to Where You Are (2011) Playwrights Horizons as "Passalus"
- The Patsy (2011) Transport Group (solo performance) NYC
- On Set with Theda Bara, world premiere The Brick (solo performance), Brooklyn, NY, 2023
- I’m Assuming You Know David Greenspan, world premiere The Atlantic Theater (solo performance), New York, NY 2025

== Awards and nominations ==
Awards

- 2026 Lucille Lortel Award for Outstanding Solo Show - I’m Assuming You Know David Greenspan
- 2013 Lambda Literary Award for Drama - The Myopia and Other Plays, a collection of five of his plays published by University of Michigan Press in 2012, won a Lambda Literary Award in 2013 in the Drama category.
- 2010 Obie Award for Sustained Achievement
- 2008 Obie Award Special Citation - The Argument
- 2007 Obie Award for Performance - Some Men
- 2007 Obie Award for Performance - "Faust"
- 2003 Obie Award Special Citation - She Stoops to Comedy
- 2002 CalArts//Alpert Awards in the Arts
- 2001 Palme d'Or for short film - Bean Cake
- 1996 Obie Award for Performance - Some Men by Terrence McNally

Nominations

- 2012 Off Broadway Alliance Award Nomination - Best Special Event, The Patsy
- 2012 Outer Critics Circle Award Nomination - Outstanding Solo Performance - "The Patsy"
- 2008 Drama League Award Nomination - Distinguished Performance Award - Beebo Brinker Chronicles
- 2007 Lucille Lortel Award Nomination - Outstanding Featured Actor - Beebo Brinker Chronicles
- 2007 Outer Critics Circle Award Nomination - Outstanding Featured Actor in a Play - Beebo Brinker Chronicles

Fellowships

- An alumnus of New Dramatists, he has received playwriting fellowships from the John Simon Guggenheim Memorial Foundation, Jerome Foundation, Joyce Mertz-Gilmore Foundation and Charles Revson Foundation. He received the 1993 McKnight Fellowship from the Playwrights Center and a 2006 Lucille Lortel Foundation Fellowship.

== Bibliography ==
- She Stoops to Comedy by David Greenspan, Samuel French, Inc., October 2013
- The Myopia and Other Plays, University of Michigan Press, 2012
- Four Plays and a Monologue, No Passport Press, 2012
- Go Back to Where You Are by David Greeenspan Playwrights Horizons, 2011
- She Stoops To Comedy in Plays From Playwrights Horizons, Vol 2, Broadway Play Publishing Inc., 2010
- "Play: A Journal of Plays, Vol. 3", 2007
- Son of an Engineer, Sun and Moon Press, 2000

== Interviews ==
- Borinsky, Alexander. "David Greenspan. And his Little Dog, Too" "The Brooklyn Rail" (March 2015)
- CFR Staff. David Greenspan on David Greenspan" The Clyde Fitch Report" (May 22, 2013)
- Charles McNulty. "Theatricalizing Theory: A Conversation with the Inimitable David Greenspan" Los Angeles Times (November 9, 2011)
- Raymond, Gerard. "Staging Solos: An Interview with David Greenspan" "Slant Magazine" (July 2011)
- Olesker, Lizzie. "The Power of Suggestion: David Greenspan" "The Brooklyn Rail" (May 2009)
