= Vanessa Garcia (artist) =

Cuban-American writer and artist

- Born: Miami, Florida
- Education: University of California, Irvine, University of Miami, Barnard College
- Occupations: Playwright, journalist, writer
- Writing career
- Genres: literature, theatre, visual art

Vanessa Garcia is a Cuban–American writer and multidisciplinary artist.

== Biography ==
She earned a PhD in English from the University of California, Irvine, an MFA in Fiction from the University of Miami, and a B.A. in English and Art History from Barnard College.

Garcia's paintings and installations have been exhibited throughout the United States and the Caribbean. Much of her work focuses on American-born Cubans and the "familial embargo," a term she coined to describe mixed feelings that many American families of Cuban descent experience due to both their love of Cuban culture and their reservations about returning to the island.

Her debut novel, White Light, was an NPR Best Book of 2015 and First Prize in the 2016 International Latino Book Awards. Her recent plays include The Cuban Spring; Grace, Sponsored by Monteverde; The Crocodile's Bite; and Amparo. Garcia's nonfiction writing has been published in The Guardian, Huffington Post, ESPN, The Rumpus, the Miami Herald, and numerous other sources.

== Amparo ==
Amparo, an immersive theatrical performance directed by Victoria Collado and produced by Havana Club, is inspired by the true story of the Arechabala family of Cuba. The work showcases Jose Arechabala's original arrival on Cuban soil, the family's founding of Havana Club Rum, and the Cuban government's eventual seizing of the company followed by the Arechabalas' forced exile. The show debuted to limited audiences in Miami and New York, and is expected to expand to greater audiences in 2019.

== White Light ==
White Light is the life story of Cuban-American artist Veronica Gonzalez, who is handed the chance to break into the art world in close proximity to her father's sudden death. The story traces Veronica as she is split between the need to mourn and the pressure to create new artwork. Praised by Nobel laureate Wole Soyinka for its "lyrical pace and texture," White Light maps a young woman's struggle to distill her sorrow, rage, and love onto the canvas. Kirkus Reviews called the novel "a lush, vibrant portrayal of the creative process, a daughter's love, and the unstoppable maelstrom of grief."
