= Hlas lesa =

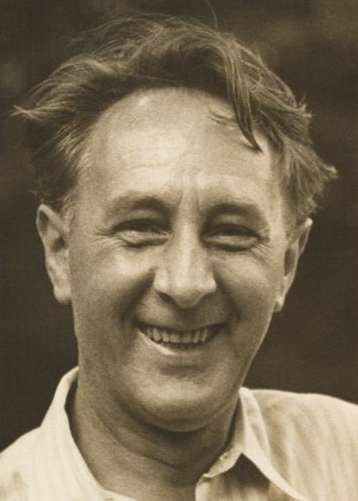
Martinu in 1943

Hlas lesa (The Voice of the Forest), is a 1935 radio opera in 1 act, H 243 by Bohuslav Martinů.

== Recordings ==
- Les larmes du couteau; with The Voice of the Forest - both sung in Czech: Hana Jonášová, Lenka Smídová, Roman Janál, Helena Kaupová, Jaroslav Brezina, Vladimír Okénko; Chamber Choir, Prague Philharmonia Jirí Belohlávek Supraphon 1CD
