= Andrew Delaplaine =

American screenwriter (1949–2023)

- Born: November 16, 1949
- Died: May 1, 2023 (aged 73)
- Occupations: Novelist, screenwriter, director, producer, publisher
- Known for: Founding Warsaw Ballroom and Wire magazine
- Notable work: Meeting Spencer (film); A Wonderful World (musical)
- Awards: Best Screenwriting, Milan International Film Festival (2014)

Andrew Delaplaine (November 16, 1949 – May 1, 2023) was an American novelist, screenwriter, director, and producer.

== Biography ==
In 1987 Delaplaine moved to South Beach Miami and, with his sister Renee, opened Scratch, one of a handful of white tablecloth restaurants in what was then a slum area of Miami. Behind Scratch, he launched an Equity theater as well as a black box nightclub called Backscratch.

In 1989 Delaplaine (along with his sister Renee) opened the Warsaw Ballroom, which quickly became one of the most outlandish gay nightclubs in the United States.

In 1991 he launched Wire, a weekly newspaper modeled on Andy Warhol's Interview. He edited and published Wire for 10 years before selling the magazine to focus on his other writing. It is still the longest-running weekly editorial published on South Beach.

In 1994, since no one else had filed to run against incumbent Mayor Seymour Gelber, thus insuring a situation where issues would never be debated, Delaplaine ran for mayor, but lost. Delaplaine was involved with the early development of A Wonderful World, a new musical based on the life of Louis Armstrong. The show will premiere on Broadway in 2024.

Delaplaine died from stomach cancer on May 1, 2023, at the age of 73.

== Films ==
Delaplaine produced, wrote and or directed several shorts and feature films. Among these pictures is the Malcolm Mowbray directed film Meeting Spencer for which he and his co-writers won "Best Screenwriting" award at the 2014 Milan International Film Festival. Meeting Spencer stars Golden Globe and Emmy Award winner Jeffrey Tambor.
