= Christopher Renshaw =

British opera and theatre director (born 1952)

Christopher Renshaw (born 18 March 1952 in Reading) is a British opera and theatre director. He has directed in multiple countries, including musical theatre in London's West End.

== Biography ==
In 2001, Renshaw directed Taboo, a musical with the book by Mark Markham, lyrics by Boy George, and music by Boy George, Kevan Frost, Richie Stevens and John Themis, in London. He work-shopped Zorro, a new musical with the book by Helen Edmundson, lyrics by Stephen Clark and music by the Gipsy Kings and John Cameron, in London, San Francisco, Los Angeles and New York. In 2008, the production went on a UK national tour before opening in the West End. Renshaw later directed Zorro in Paris, Moscow, Tokyo, Amsterdam and Atlanta.

In 2016 he directed the world premier of Carmen La Cubana, billed as "The First Cuban Musical", at Paris’s Théâtre du Châtelet. Carmen La Cubana narrates a gripping love story set against the backdrop of 1950s Cuba, at the dawn of the revolution.

In 2020, he directed the world-premiere musical, A Wonderful World, commissioned by Miami New Drama for its 2019-2020 theatrical season at the Colony Theatre. The musical follows the life and music career of Louis Armstrong, and is told from the perspective of his four wives. The show will debut on Broadway in 2024.

He directed Michael McKeever's The Code at Southwark Playhouse in 2025. The Stage described it as “Entertaining exposé of the real price of fame”.
