= Gregory Mosher =

American director, producer, and writer

- Born: January 15, 1949 (age 77); New York City, U.S.
- Education: Oberlin College; Ithaca College (BFA); Juilliard School

Gregory Mosher (born January 15, 1949) is an American director and producer of stage productions at the Lincoln Center and Goodman Theatres, on and off-Broadway, at the Royal National Theatre, and in the West End. He is also a film director and television director, producer, and writer. He currently serves as Executive Director of the Office of the Arts and Senior Advisor to the President for the Arts at Hunter College, where he is also the Patty and Jay Baker Professor of Theatre.

== Early career ==
Born 1949 in New York City, Mosher attended Oberlin College, Ithaca College and the Juilliard School where he was the school's first directing student. After leaving Juilliard in his third year, he moved to Chicago to assist William Woodman, head of the Goodman Theatre, who appointed him to lead the newly formed Goodman Stage 2, one of the pioneering theatres of the 1970s Chicago theatre scene. Three years later, after Woodman's resignation, he became director of the Goodman. Beginning with a new version of Richard Wright’s Native Son, and focusing on new work, the Goodman soon gained wide national attention. Among his early work was the first production of David Mamet's American Buffalo.

== Lincoln Center ==
After seven seasons at the Goodman, Mosher was invited by former New York City mayor John V. Lindsay to head the theatre at Lincoln Center, which, despite the leadership of such theatre giants as Elia Kazan and Joseph Papp, had faltered through much of its twenty-year history. At the time of Lindsay's offer, the theatre had not produced a play in over four years; it had virtually no operating capital, little ability to generate it, and no community of artists to energize the stages.

Mosher launched an innovative production schedule and revolutionized marketing efforts, discarding the traditional subscriber arrangement to seek a younger, less affluent, and more diverse audience. These efforts, supported by a remarkable board and staff including Executive Producer Bernard Gersten and a freshly enthused giving community, quickly sparked theatrical life; the company's two houses were soon filled, and annual income rose within two years to nearly $45 million.

During this period, Mosher continued to focus on new work. While many of the creators (such as Julie Taymor) were at that time relatively unknown in New York, others were legendary; Lincoln Center and Goodman audiences saw new work from Samuel Beckett, Tennessee Williams, Arthur Miller, Leonard Bernstein, Jerome Robbins, Elaine May, Stephen Sondheim and eventual Nobel prize-winners Wole Soyinka and Derek Walcott.

Among the most celebrated of Mosher's productions were John Guare’s Six Degrees of Separation, David Rabe’s Hurlyburly (starring William Hurt, Sigourney Weaver, Harvey Keitel and Christopher Walken, directed by Mike Nichols); the South African township musical Sarafina!, Mike Nichols' version of Waiting for Godot, James Joyce's The Dead (Tony Award for author Richard Nelson), numerous Spalding Gray premieres (including Swimming to Cambodia and Monster in a Box), David Mamet's Speed-the-Plow, John Leguizamo’s Freak, Anything Goes, the long delayed world premiere of Zora Neale Hurston and Langston Hughes’s Mulebone, and the widely acclaimed revival of Our Town, for which Mosher won his second Tony Award.

Lincoln Center Theater productions were adapted into a dozen feature films, presented in cast recordings, and on television for NBC and PBS. Productions at the Beaumont and the Newhouse Theaters frequently were extended or transferred for long runs on Broadway, as well as venues in England, Europe and Japan.

== Broadway ==
In addition to Lincoln Center Theater shows on Broadway, Mosher has produced and/or directed several other productions. These include "A Streetcar Named Desire" (starring Jessica Lange and Alec Baldwin), "James Joyce's The Dead", John Leguizamo's "Freak", and the 2010 production of Arthur Miller's "A View from the Bridge" (starring Liev Schreiber and Scarlett Johansson), and "That Championship Season" (starring Brian Cox, Jim Gaffigan, Chris Noth, Jason Patric, and Kiefer Sutherland).

== Collaboration ==
Mosher directed and produced the premieres of twenty-three of David Mamet's plays, beginning with American Buffalo in 1975. His Broadway production of Glengarry Glen Ross garnered Mamet the Pulitzer Prize. His collaboration with Samuel Beckett spanned the final decade of that writer's life, and included Beckett's own production of Endgame, and the Lincoln Center production of Waiting for Godot, directed by Mike Nichols.

His collaboration with Tennessee Williams included William's final full-length play, A House Not Meant to Stand, directing and producing the 1992 Broadway revival of A Streetcar Named Desire, starring Alec Baldwin and Jessica Lange, and the Kennedy Center production of The Glass Menagerie.

During South Africa's apartheid period, Mosher was a frequent visitor to Johannesburg and Soweto. He organized the first-ever festival of South African drama (Woza Afrika!) at Lincoln Center, showcasing theatrical productions and funneling tens of thousands of dollars to Township arts groups and individual artists. In 2015, he traveled with a young company to perform Sophocles' "Antigone" in schools, community centers, and a juvenile prison in Nairobi and the Cape Town and Johannesburg townships. In 2017, he directed the American premiere of Ferdinand Von Schirach's Terror for Miami New Drama at the Colony Theatre.

During the NEA "decency" debate of the early 1990s, Mosher, with the support of John Lindsay, was one of a very small group of arts administrators to decline the Endowment's annual grant.

== Film ==
His film The Prime Gig (starring Vince Vaughn, Ed Harris, and Julia Ormond) played the Venice, London, and Los Angeles Film festivals. He directed (for TNT) Mamet's A Life in the Theatre (starring Jack Lemmon and Matthew Broderick), which won the CableACE Award for Best Drama, and produced the film version of American Buffalo, starring Dustin Hoffman and Dennis Franz. For the BBC, he directed Uncle Vanya, starring Ian Holm, David Warner, and Mary Elizabeth Mastrantonio. He has written three screenplays, including an adaptation of Vladimir Nabokov's Laughter in the Dark.

== Columbia Arts Initiative ==
President Lee C. Bollinger created the Arts Initiative at Columbia University in 2004 to change the role of the arts across the university, and hired Mosher as its first director, a position he stepped down from in Fall 2010. Since its inception the Initiative has developed programs to enliven the arts on campus and to link the university's intellectual mission to New York's cultural life. Among its programs are Passport to NYC, which provides Columbia students with free admission at 28 New York City museums, including the Metropolitan Museum, MoMA and the Guggenheim.

In 2005, Mosher collaborated with Peter Brook, bringing Brook's company, CICT, to Barnard College for a month-long residency. This residency marked a break in the long-standing relationship between Brook and Brooklyn Academy of Music.

Brook staged Tierno Bokar, based on the life of the Malian Sufi of the same name. The play was adapted for the stage by Marie-Hélène Estienne from Vie et enseignement de Tierno Bokar, le sage de Bandiagara by Amadou Hampate Ba (translated into English as A Spirit of Tolerance: The Inspiring Life of Tierno Bokar). Columbia University produced 44 related events, lectures, and workshops that were attended by over 3,200 people throughout the run of Tierno Bokar. Panel discussions focused on topics of religious tolerance and Muslim tradition in West Africa.

== Other ==
Mosher is currently the Executive Director of the Office of the Arts and Senior Advisor to the President for the Arts at Hunter College, where he is also the Patty and Jay Baker Professor of Theatre.

Jay Baker Professor of Theatre at Hunter College. Has formerly a professor at Columbia's School of the Arts, and has lectured or guest-taught at Yale, New York University (NYU), University of Pennsylvania, and Juilliard.

== Awards ==
His American theatre awards include two Tonys and a Drama Desk Special Award.
