= Meeting Spencer =

- Directed by: Malcolm Mowbray
- Written by: Andrew Delaplaine, Andrei Kole, Scott Kasdin
- Release date: April 8, 2011
- Running time: 88 minutes
- Country: United States
- Language: English

Meeting Spencer is a 2011 film directed by Malcolm Mowbray and written by Andrew Delaplaine. It has a 36% on Rotten Tomatoes based on 11 reviews. After a series of Hollywood flops, famed director Harris Chappell returns to New York to relaunch his Broadway career. But Chappell's triumphant comeback begins to spiral out of control into a wild night of comic misadventure after meeting struggling actor Spencer and his old flame Didi.

== Cast ==
- Jeffrey Tambor as Harris Chappell
- Jesse Plemons as Spencer West
- Don Stark as Wolfie
- Yvonne Zima as Sophia Martinelli
- William Morgan Sheppard as Larry Lind
- Jill Marie Jones as Nikki Ross
