= Tectonic Theater Project =

American theater company

- Formation: 1991
- Type: Theatre group
- Location: New York City
- Artistic director: Moisés Kaufman
- Website: tectonictheaterproject.org

Tectonic Theater Project is a stage and theater group whose plays have been performed around the world. The company is dedicated to developing works that explore theatrical language and form, fostering dialogue with audiences on the social, political, and human issues that affect society. In service to this goal, Tectonic supports readings, workshops, and full theatrical productions, as well as training for students around the United States in their play-making techniques. The company has won a GLAAD Media Award.

== History ==
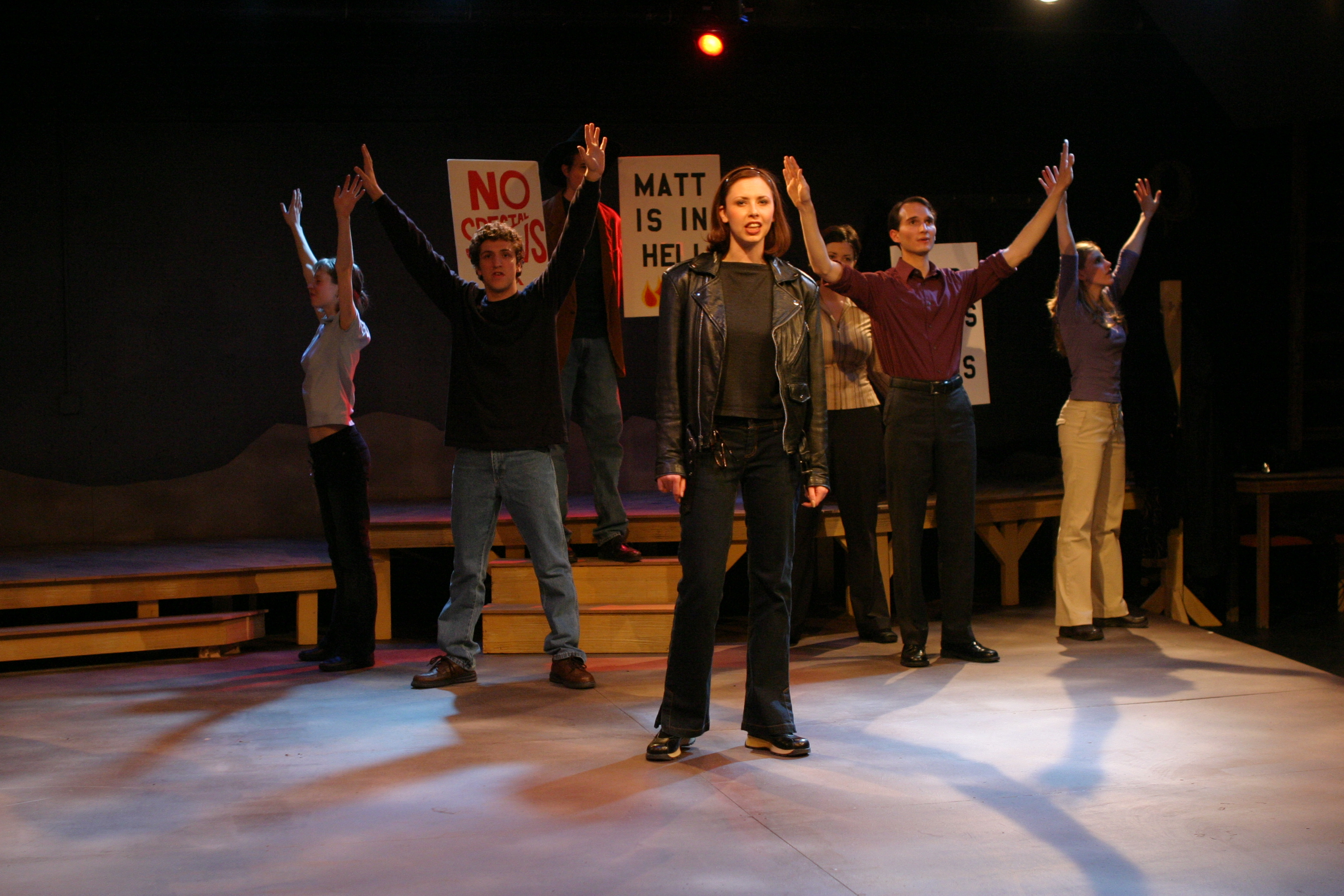
Early production of The Laramie Project

Tectonic Theater Project was founded in 1991 by Moisés Kaufman and his husband Jeffrey LaHoste in New York City, after Kaufman left the NYU Tisch School of the Arts. Moisés was encouraged by Arthur Bartow to start his own theater company, as the themes he wanted to explore – namely theater as a medium for social-political change – were not being aptly practised by existing groups.

The company had a challenging start. Rehearsals were held in the apartment of the two founders and in other unconventional spaces, such as church basements and the backrooms of bars, and performances often drew very small audiences. The company's first official production was Women in Beckett, an anthology of short plays by Samuel Beckett for women, performed in the lobby of the Theater for the New City in November 1991, exploring the creation of liminal spaces in a theater that was consistently disturbed by other performances.

In the early years of Tectonic, the company staged other works by writers who were experimenting with unorthodox theatrical form, like the aforementioned Samuel Beckett, Franz Xaver Kroetz, Sophie Treadwell, and Naomi Iizuka. As the company progressed, the focus of Kaufman shifted from theatrical form to societal issues, taking inspiration from Brecht's and Brechtian concepts of engaging the audience in political discourse. The company began work on Gross Indecency in 1997, addressing Oscar Wilde's trials for the crime of sodomy.

One month after the murder of gay University of Wyoming student Matthew Shepard, Kaufman and ten company members travelled to Laramie, Wyoming to interview people in the town torn apart by the crime. The play developed from these interviews was created collaboratively by the company members over a long workshop process, during which participants were encouraged to work outside their usual areas of specialization: actors and designers became writers and dramaturgs, directors became designers and actors, and the company discovered a new way of creating a theatrical event, resulting in The Laramie Project.

== Works ==
=== Gross Indecency (1997) ===
This play, written and directed by Moisés Kaufman, examines the series of events set in motion by Oscar Wilde's 1895 libel suit against the Marquess of Queensberry and his relations with the Marquess's son, Lord Alfred Douglas. The play was first performed in 1997 Off-Broadway.

=== The Laramie Project (2000) ===
The Laramie Project, written and directed by Moisés Kaufman, Stephen Belber and Leigh Fondakowski, is a verbatim stage play following the aftermath in the town of Laramie, Wyoming, after the 1998 murder of Matthew Shepard, a 21-year-old gay man. The play examined the bigotry that enabled the crime, and prompted a social dialogue and exploration of the issue underlying hate across America and wider areas.

=== I Am My Own Wife ===
Winner of the 2004 Tony Award for Best Play and Best Actor (Jefferson Mays), I Am My Own Wife is the true story of Charlotte Von Mahlsdorf, Berlin's most famous transvestite, who survived two of the most oppressive regimes of the 20th century, the Nazis and the Communists, in a dress. The play was written by Doug Wright (author of Quills) after gathering hundreds of hours of interviews with Charlotte in the early 90s.

Directed by Moisés Kaufman and created using Tectonic's devised theater technique, Moment Work, the play was workshopped at Sundance Theater Lab then transferred to Playwrights Horizons and finally to Broadway. I Am My Own Wife is the recipient of the 2004 Pulitzer Prize for Drama.

=== 33 Variations ===
In 1819, the fledgeling publisher Anton Diabelli commissioned 50 composers to write a variation on a waltz which he had created. Beethoven rejected the invitation, dismissing Diabelli's waltz as ordinary. He then changed his mind and created not one but 33 variations on Diabelli's theme. Kaufman's play weaves Beethoven's artistic journey with that of Katherine, a contemporary musicologist wrestling to pin down the source of the composer's fascination with the simple waltz. Deciphering clues left behind in Beethoven's notebooks and letters, Katherine delves into his compositional process and daily life, finding even greater insight into her own obsession with genius.

=== One Arm ===
An adaptation of Tennessee Williams’ unproduced screenplay of his own short story. One Arm follows Ollie, a young farm boy who joins the Navy and becomes the lightweight boxing champion of the Pacific Fleet. Soon after, he loses his arm in a car accident, and turns to 'hustling' to survive. One Arm is one of Williams' character studies, taking the viewer through Ollie's personal Odyssey in a disenfranchised American underworld prior to the Second World War.

=== The Laramie Project: 10 Years Later ===
In 2008, the members of Tectonic Theater Project returned to Laramie, Wyoming to explore how the town had changed since the murder of Matthew Shepard and the original play. What they found defied their expectations. The resulting piece they created was a new play about how people construct their own history. This play is the continuing story of the American town of Laramie.

=== El Gato Con Botas (2010) ===
Tectonic Theater Project collaborated with Gotham Chamber Opera in 2010 to present Xavier Montsalvatge's opera adaptation 'El Gato con Botas' of (Puss in Boots). The 70-minute opera/puppet show was directed by Moisés Kaufman, and conducted by Neal Goren, founder of Gotham Chamber Opera.

=== The Tallest Tree in the Forest (2013) ===
The Tallest Tree in the Forest is a docudrama that explores both the private and public life of Paul Robeson, a singer, actor, and civil rights campaigner who was a prominent figure in the 1920s to 1940s. Robeson lost popularity in the late 1940s after being accused of supporting communist organisations. The Tallest Tree in the Forest uses multi-character transformation, monologues, narrative scenes, poetry, and video footage of from the era to create a representation of Robeson's life, and explore his evolution as both an artist and as an activist.

=== The Album: Here There are Blueberries (2018) ===
The Album is a work-in-progress presented in collaboration with Miami New Drama. It focuses on an album that was delivered to the Holocaust Museum in 2008, with pictures of different Nazi officers, secretaries, and their families on vacation during World War II. It is a documentary theater piece that uses the album itself, interviews, and personal accounts as source material. The inaugural production was written and directed by Moisés Kaufman, and ran at the Colony Theatre from May 31, 2018 - June 3, 2018.

== In other media ==
In 2002, The Tectonic Theater Project collaborated with HBO to create the film The Laramie Project, based closely on their play of the same name. The film starred multiple cast members from the original company and was directed by the original writer, Moisés Kaufman. The Laramie Project opened the 2002 Sundance Film Festival, and was nominated for four Emmys. The film received multiple other awards, including the GLAAD media award for outstanding television movie in 2003.
