= Collado Hermoso =

- Municipality
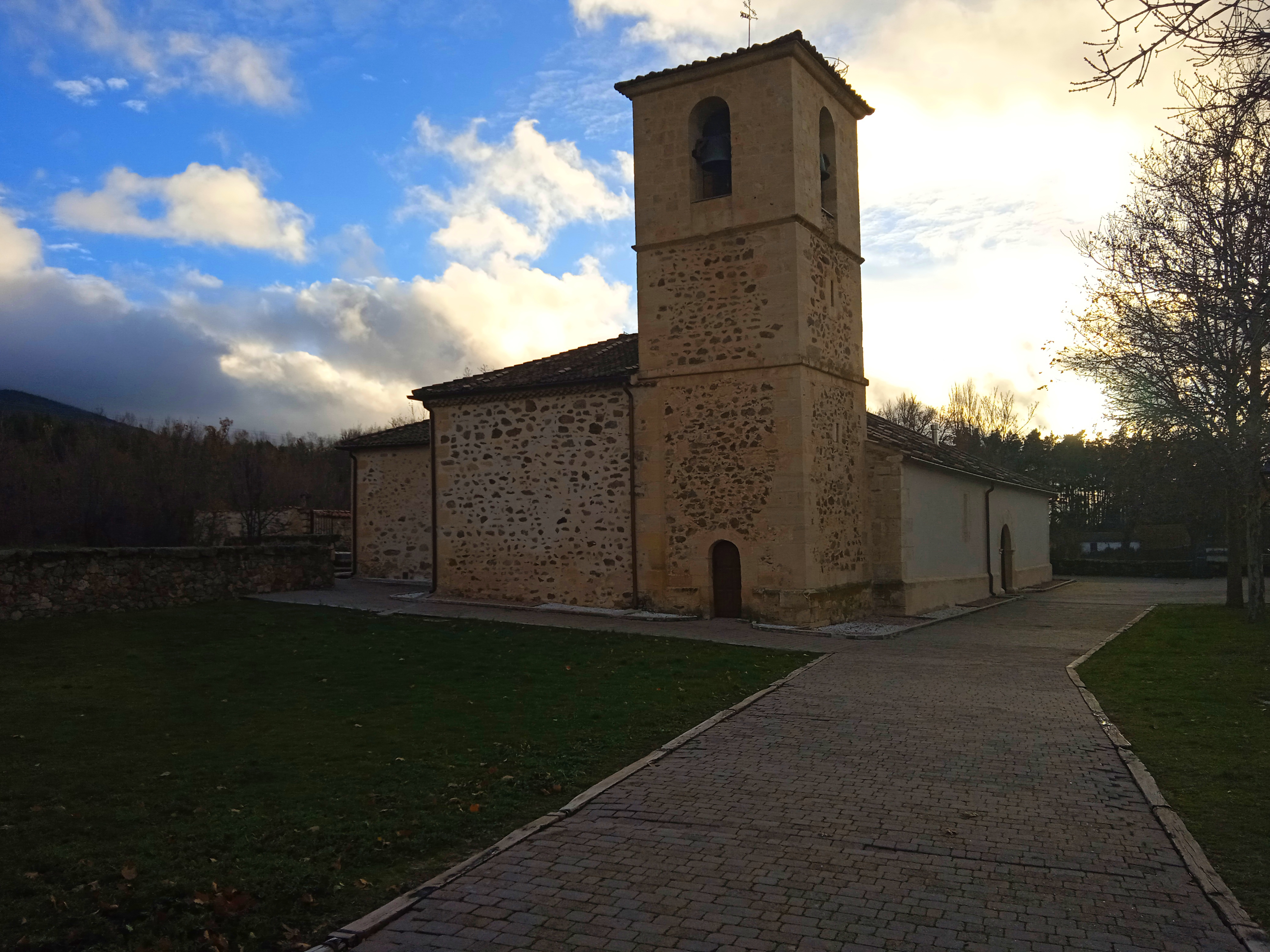
- Parish Church of San Nicolás de Bari

- Location in Spain. Collado Hermoso (Spain)
- Coordinates: 41°02′21″N 3°55′06″W
- Country: Spain
- Autonomous community: Castile and León
- Province: Segovia
- Municipality: Collado Hermoso

Area
  - Total: 16.38 km^{2} (6.32 sq mi)
- Elevation: 1,222 m (4,009 ft)

Population (2025-01-01)
  - Total: 116
  - Density: 7.08/km^{2} (18.3/sq mi)
- Time zone: UTC+1 (CET)
  - Summer (DST): UTC+2 (CEST)
- Website: Official website

Collado Hermoso is a municipality located in the province of Segovia, Castile and León, Spain. According to the 2004 census (INE), the municipality had a population of 154 inhabitants.
