= Collado del Mirón =

- municipality
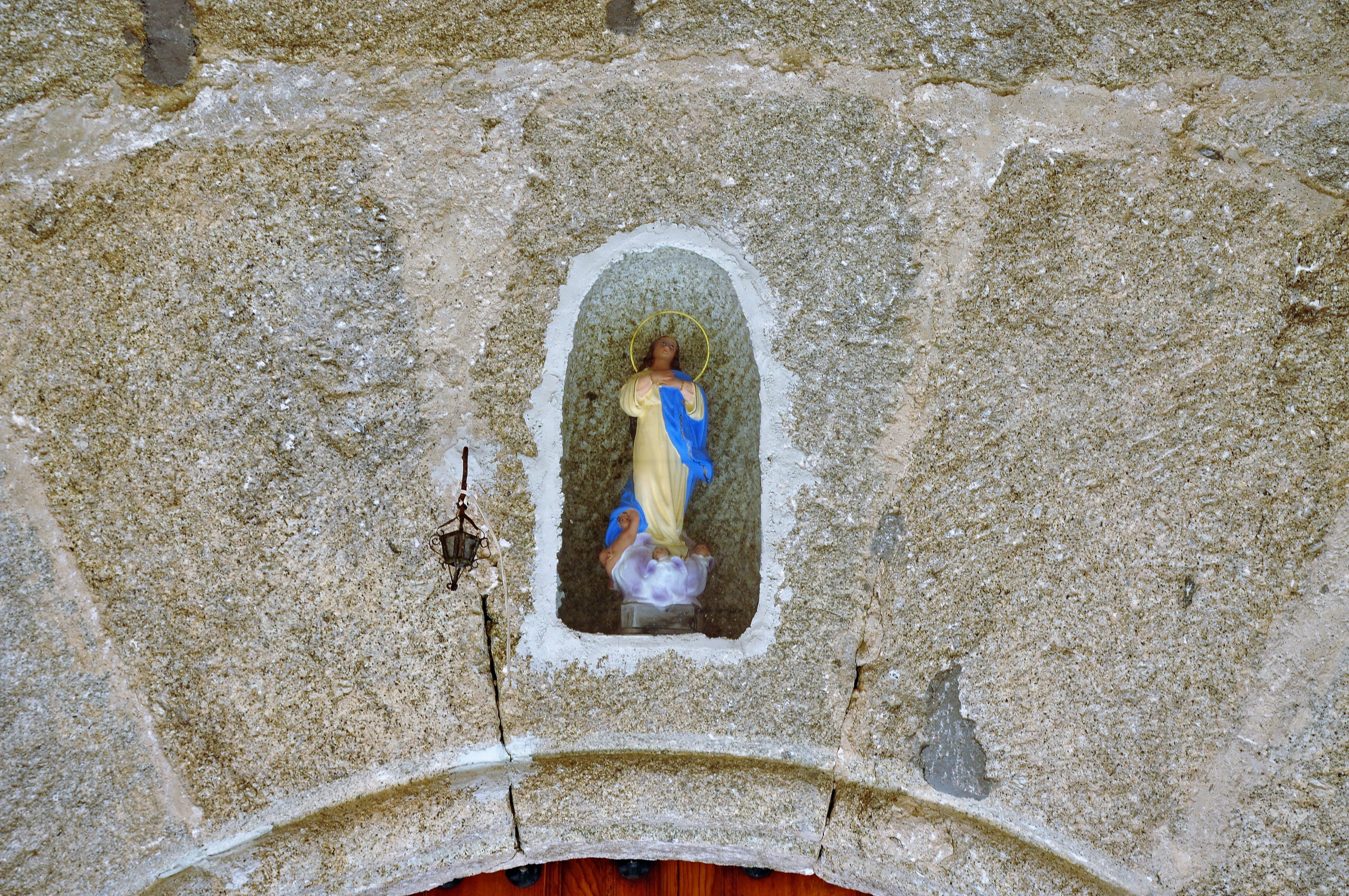
- Collado del Mirón church

- Flag

- Location in Spain. Collado del Mirón (Spain)
- Coordinates: 40°33′10″N 5°21′14″W
- Country: Spain
- Autonomous community: Castile and León
- Province: Ávila
- Municipality: Collado del Mirón

Area
  - Total: 4.84 km^{2} (1.87 sq mi)
- Elevation: 1,166 m (3,825 ft)

Population (2025-01-01)
  - Total: 18
  - Density: 3.7/km^{2} (9.6/sq mi)
- Time zone: UTC+1 (CET)
  - Summer (DST): UTC+2 (CEST)
- Website: Official website

Collado del Mirón is a municipality located in the province of Ávila, Castile and León, Spain.

== Population ==
Historical population
Year	Pop.	±% p.a.
2023	24	—
2024	20	−16.67%
2025	18	−10.00%
Source: INE
