= María Carmen Collado =

Spanish swimmer

Personal information
- Born: July 29, 1983 (age 42)

Sport
- Sport: Swimming
- Strokes: Breaststroke

María Carmen Collado (born 29 July 1983) is a Spanish former swimmer who competed in the 2000 Summer Olympics.
