= Miami New Drama =

American nonprofit professional theater company

- Formation: 2014
- Type: Nonprofit
- Location: Miami Beach, Florida, United States

Miami New Drama is a nonprofit professional theater company located in Miami Beach, Florida, founded in 2014. Since October 2016 it has been the resident theater company and operator of the historic Colony Theatre on Miami Beach. Since its first production in January 2016, the company has produced work by American, Latin American, and international theater artists.

Miami New Drama focuses primarily on the development of new plays and musicals, serving as an incubator for new theatrical works. It produces work that is diverse, multicultural, and multilingual with theater artists such as Moisés Kaufman, Gregory Mosher, Christopher Renshaw, and Aurin Squire.

== History ==
Miami New Drama was co-founded in 2014 by Venezuelan-born playwrights and directors Michel Hausmann and Moisés Kaufman. They moved from New York City to Miami to start Miami New Drama, with the intent of creating a regional theater that reflected its community, representing cross-cultural themes, and building cultural and political understanding. Hausmann serves as the company's artistic director.

The company's debut production, The Golem of Havana, directed and with a book written by Hausmann, and music and lyrics by Salomon Lerner and Len Schiff, opened at the Colony Theatre in Miami Beach in January 2016. Hausmann, Lerner, and Shiff, along with their friends and families and the group's board, produced the play with their own money, at a substantial risk. Following the successful production, Miami New Drama took over operations of the Colony Theatre on October 1, 2016.

As of May 2016, 20% of the non-profit company's funding came from Miami Beach and Miami-Dade County, and 80% came from individual donors. By December 2017, Miami New Drama had received two Knights Arts Challenge grants from the John S. and James L. Knight Foundation. One of the grants was in support of the company's multilingual production of Thornton Wilder's Our Town, and it is the first theater company to be authorized by the Thornton Wilder Estate to make changes to Wilder's script. Miami New Drama was also a Knight New Work Miami 2018 winner.

On January 23, 2019, PBS broadcast the company's production of Kemp Powers' fact-based 2013 play, One Night in Miami. In June 2019, the company co-hosted the Theatre Communications Group's 29th National Conference, attended by theater professionals from across the nation.

Since its debut production, as of 2020 the company has produced over a dozen plays at the Colony Theatre, nine of them new works. In the span of its first three active years, Miami New Drama went from being a startup company to a theater company with a budget of nearly $3 million per year.

== Selected productions ==
=== The Golem of Havana (2016) ===
The Golem of Havana is a musical with music by Salomon Lerner, lyrics by Len Schiff, and a book by Miami New Drama's artistic director, Michel Hausmann, who also directed the company's production. The musical is centered around a Jewish-Hungarian family and their plight in the midst of the Cuban revolution. The play ran at the Colony Theatre from January 14, 2016, to February 14, 2016 after productions at La MaMa in 2013 and Barrington Stage Company in 2014.

=== Terror (2017) ===
The American premiere of Ferdinand Von Schirach's Terror was directed by Gregory Mosher. The play puts a military pilot on trial for shooting down a hijacked plane headed towards a large group of people, and asks the audience to act as the jurors on the case.

=== Our Town (2017) ===
The company's multilingual adaptation of Thornton Wilder's Our Town was directed by Hausmann. In this re-imagination of the play, still set in New England, the characters speak English, Spanish, and Creole. Translations were written by Nilo Cruz and Jeff Augustin.

=== The Elaborate Entrance of Chad Deity (2018) ===
The Elaborate Entrance of Chad Deity, written by Kristoffer Diaz, was a 2010 Pulitzer Prize finalist for Drama. It was produced by Miami New Drama in collaboration with Asolo Repertory Theatre. Set in the pro-wrestling world, the play tackles issues of race, politics, and the American Dream.

=== Queen of Basel (2018) ===
Queen of Basel is a new play commissioned by the company and written by Hilary Bettis; it was first directed by Hausmann. It is a feminist and bi-lingual re-imagining of August Strindberg's Miss Julie set during Miami's Art Basel in a luxurious South Beach hotel. Hausmann seated 100 audience members on stage to provide an immersive feel for theatergoers.

The new drama sparked interest from a variety of venues, and it was subsequently produced at the Studio Theatre in Washington, D.C. The leading actress in the Miami New Drama production, Betsy Graver, won the 2018 Carbonell Award for Best Actress in a Play.

=== The Album (2018) ===
The Album, presented by Tectonic Theater Project, was written and first directed by Moisés Kaufman. The play focuses on an album that was delivered to the Holocaust Museum in 2008, with pictures of different Nazi officers, secretaries, and their families on vacation during World War II. The play is a documentary theater piece that uses the album itself, interviews, and personal accounts as source material.

=== Puras cosas maravillosas (2018) ===
Puras cosas maravillosas, a Spanish adaptation of Duncan Macmillan's Every Brilliant Thing, was directed by Hausmann and starred Erika de la Vega. This immersive one-woman show followed a young girl's journey into adulthood, marked by her mother's depression and suicide attempts.

=== One Night in Miami (2018) ===
One Night in Miami, written by Kemp Powers, was directed for Miami New Drama by Carl Cofield. The play takes place on the night that Cassius Clay won the World Heavyweight Championship, and since he could not celebrate on Miami Beach due to the segregation laws of the time, he heads to Overtown, Miami, with his colleagues: Malcolm X, Sam Cooke, and Jim Brown. The play imagines what that night in the Hampton House Motel in Overtown might have looked like. On January 23, 2019, PBS broadcast the production.

The play won the 2018 Carbonell Award for Best Scenic Design (Play or Musical).

=== Confessions of a Cocaine Cowboy (2019) ===
Confessions of a Cocaine Cowboy is a new play based on the documentaries Cocaine Cowboys and Cocaine Cowboys 2 by Billy Corben. This play is a documentary theater piece co-written by Billy Corben and Aurin Squire, using text from depositions, newspaper articles, and other documents from the time. It was directed by Hausmann. The play focuses on the way the city of Miami was shaped by the 1980s illegal drug trade.

=== The Bridge of San Luis Rey (2019) ===
Based on Thornton Wilder's Pulitzer Prize-winning novel of the same name, The Bridge of San Luis Rey was adapted for the stage and directed for Miami New Drama by David Greenspan, who also appeared in the play. It follows five travelers who lose their life on a bridge in colonial Peru.

=== A Wonderful World (2020) ===
A Wonderful World is a new musical with a book by Aurin Squire with music by Louis Armstrong, arranged by Annastasia Victory and Michael O. Mitchell. It was directed for Miami New Drama by Christopher Renshaw. The story follows Armstrong through his life, from his beginnings in New Orleans to his rise to international stardom and eventual role during the Civil Rights era. it is told from the perspective of Armstrong's four wives. The show will transfer to Broadway in 2024.
