= CH Collado Villalba =

- City: Collado Villalba, Spain
- Home arena: Palacio de Hielo DREAMS
- Colours: Black, green, yellow

CH Collado Villalba was an ice hockey team in Collado Villalba, Madrid, Spain. The club consisted only of junior teams, and last participated in the Spanish U20 and U18 Leagues during the 2007-08 season. Their home arena was the Palacio de Hielo DREAMS, which has a capacity of 4,800 spectators.
