= Hoyos del Collado =

- municipality
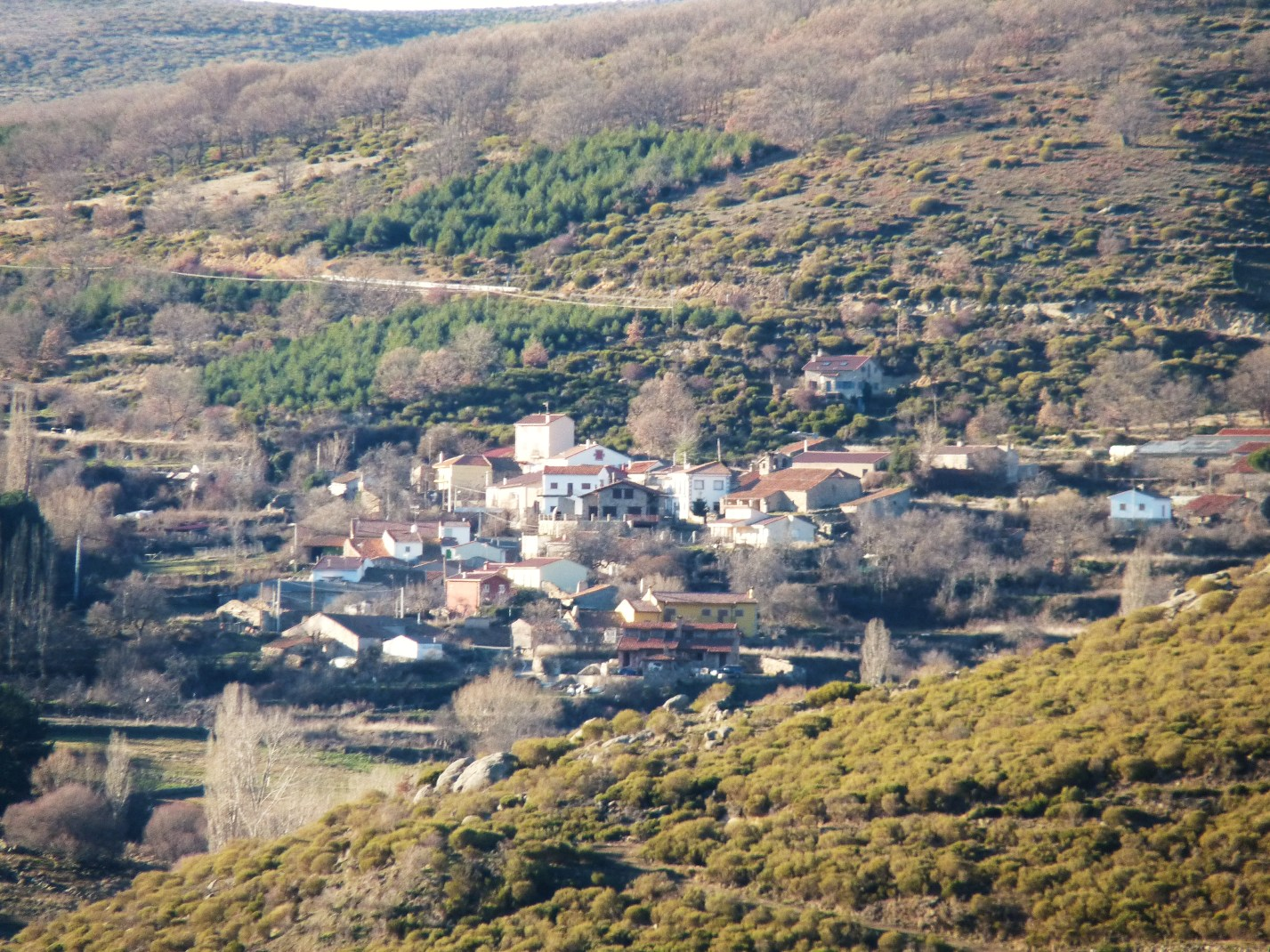
- View of Hoyos del Collado.
- Flag Coat of arms
- Location in Spain. Hoyos del Collado (Castile and León)
- Coordinates: 40°21′34″N 5°12′04″W
- Country: Spain
- Autonomous community: Castile and León
- Province: Ávila
- Municipality: Hoyos del Collado

Area
  - Total: 9 km^{2} (3.5 sq mi)

Population (2025-01-01)
  - Total: 28
  - Density: 3.1/km^{2} (8.1/sq mi)
- Time zone: UTC+1 (CET)
  - Summer (DST): UTC+2 (CEST)
- Website: Official website

Hoyos del Collado is a municipality located in the province of Ávila, Castile and León, Spain.

The local economy relies on Merino sheep farming, producing wool used in textile weaving and knitting. Sheep farming involves ten residents, with livestock either remaining in Hoyos year-round or migrating to Extremadura during the winter. Cattle and poultry (including chickens, turkeys, and geese) are also raised. The municipality features several springs, proximity to a river, and views of the surrounding mountains.

== Population ==
Historical population
Year	Pop.	±% p.a.
2023	29	—
2024	30	+3.45%
2025	28	−6.67%
Source: INE
