= Diego Collado's Grammar of the Japanese Language =

1632 description of the Japanese language

Diego Collado's Grammar of the Japanese Language (Latin: Ars grammaticae Iaponicae lingvae (i.e. Ars grammaticae Iaponicae linguae)) is a description of the Japanese language published in 1632, attempting to fit Japanese grammar into a Latin grammatical framework. An English translation by Richard L. Spear was published in 1975.
