= Santiago del Collado =

- municipality
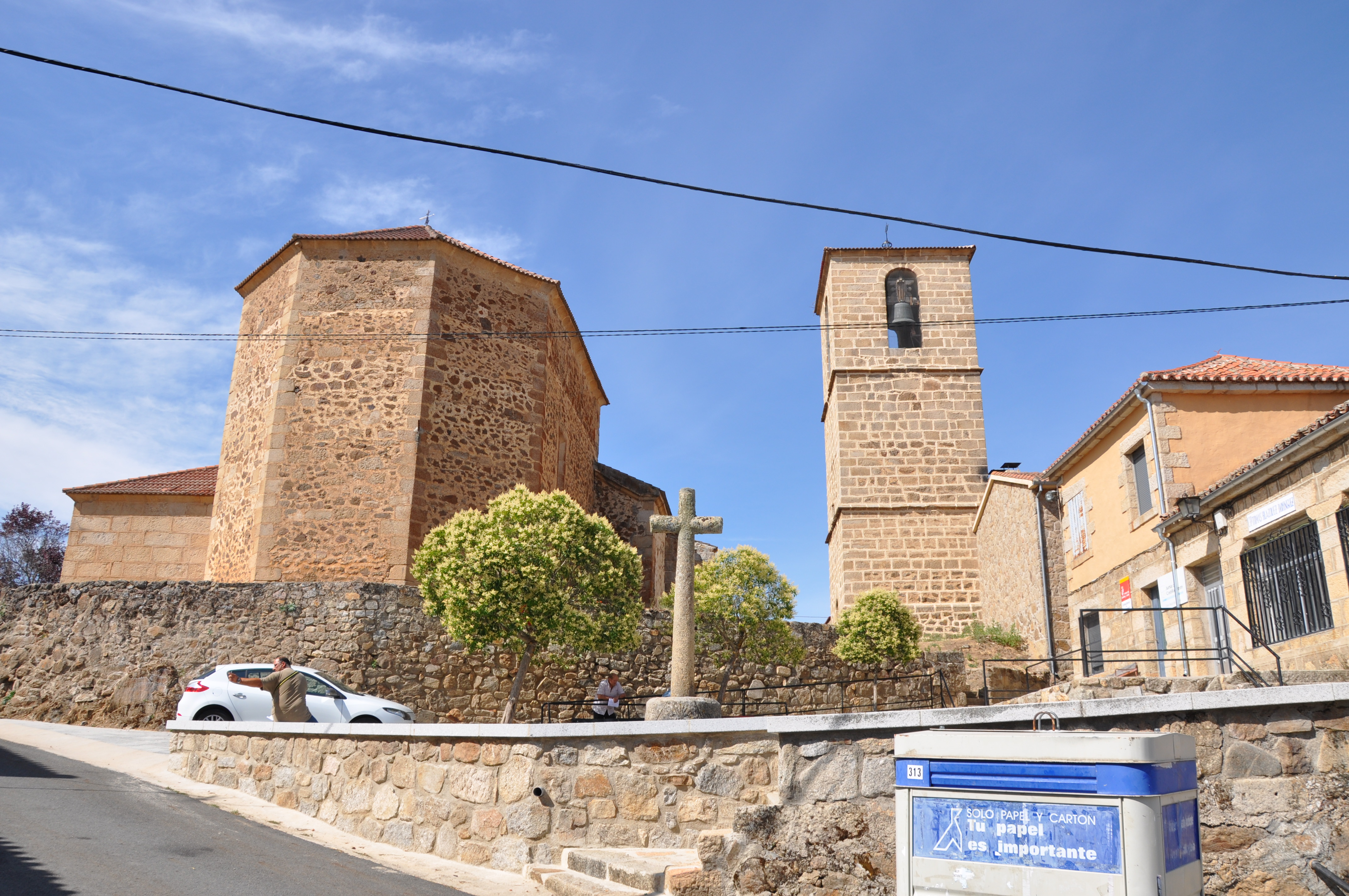
- View of the church and the exempt bell tower in Santiago del Collado, Ávila, Spain

- Location in Spain. Santiago del Collado (Spain)
- Coordinates: 40°26′01″N 5°21′23″W
- Country: Spain
- Autonomous community: Castile and León
- Province: Ávila

Area
  - Total: 42 km^{2} (16 sq mi)

Population (2025-01-01)
  - Total: 161
  - Density: 3.8/km^{2} (9.9/sq mi)
- Time zone: UTC+1 (CET)
  - Summer (DST): UTC+2 (CEST)
- Website: Official website

Santiago del Collado is a municipality located in the province of Ávila, Castile and León, Spain.

== Population ==
Historical population
| Year | Pop. | ±% p.a. |
|---|---|---|
| 2023 | 168 | — |
| 2024 | 162 | −3.57% |
| 2025 | 161 | −0.62% |
Source: INE
