= Collado de Contreras =

- municipality
- Flag Coat of arms

- Location in Spain. Collado de Contreras (Spain)
- Coordinates: 40°53′12″N 4°55′40″W
- Country: Spain
- Autonomous community: Castile and León
- Province: Province of Ávila
- Municipality: Collado de Contreras

Area
  - Total: 18.44 km^{2} (7.12 sq mi)
- Elevation: 918 m (3,012 ft)

Population (2025-01-01)
  - Total: 147
  - Density: 7.97/km^{2} (20.6/sq mi)
- Time zone: UTC+1 (CET)
  - Summer (DST): UTC+2 (CEST)
- Website: Official website

Collado de Contreras is a municipality located in the province of Ávila, Castile and León, Spain.

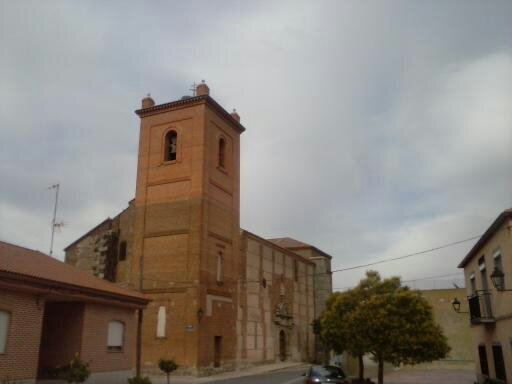
Exterior of the parish church of Collado Contreras

== Population ==
Historical population
Year	Pop.	±% p.a.
2023	143	—
2024	145	+1.40%
2025	147	+1.38%
Source: INE
