= Collado de la Vera =

Coordinates: 40°03′N 5°43′W

- Flag Coat of arms

- Location in Spain.
- Country: Spain
- Autonomous community: Cáceres

Area
  - Total: 44.94 km^{2} (17.35 sq mi)
- Elevation: 526 m (1,726 ft)

Population (2025-01-01)
  - Total: 274
  - Density: 6.10/km^{2} (15.8/sq mi)
- Time zone: UTC+1 (CET)
  - Summer (DST): UTC+2 (CEST)

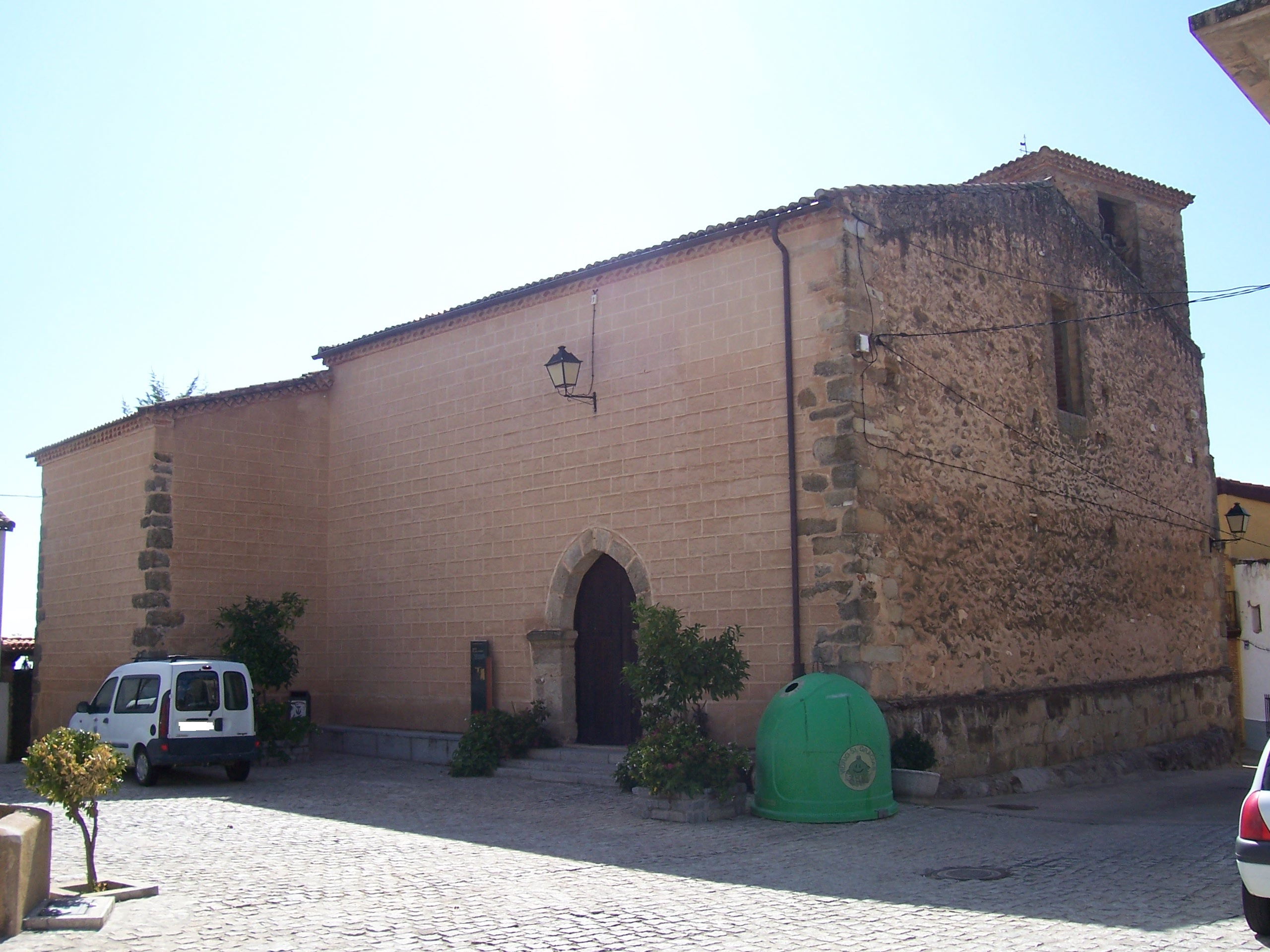
Collado de la Vera Church, Cáceres province, Spain

Collado de la Vera is a municipality in the province of Cáceres and autonomous community of Extremadura, Spain. The municipality covers an area of 44.94 square kilometres (17.35 sq mi) and as of 2011 had a population of 188 people. Now it has a population of about 190 people.

== See also ==
- List of municipalities in Cáceres
