= David Padilla (DJ) =

- Born: February 16, 1961; New York City, New York
- Died: August 19, 2020 (aged 59)
- Genres: Dance, house, trance
- Occupation: Club DJ
- Years active: 1978–2012
- Labels: Max Music, Ultra Records
- Website: www.davidpadillaentertainment.com

David Padilla (February 16, 1961 – August 19, 2020) was an American disc jockey of electronic dance music, house music, progressive house, and trance music. Padilla was the resident DJ at the Warsaw Ballroom and The Mix.

Padilla is credited as a pioneer of Miami's after-hour scene.

== Early life and career ==
Padilla began experimenting with music in his early teens. He met John Benitez at a house party, who inspired him interest in becoming a disc jockey.

Padilla was an early regular at David Mancuso's The Loft where he met Larry Levan, Frankie Knuckles, David Morales, among other notable DJs. Brad LeBeau, a disc jockey at Xenon Club, called Padilla and offered him a job there.

== Miami Beach ==
In 1989 Padilla moved to what was later known as South Beach in Miami, Florida, where he was offered the resident DJ spot at the Warsaw Ballroom, where he began gaining more recognition. Padilla worked at the Warsaw while celebrities such as Madonna, Gianni Versace and Donatella Versace attended. The club closed on Friday 25 May 2002.

His CDs “The Mix Afterhours” a 2-disc set was released on June 1, 1999, on the Max Music & Entertainment label; according to Max Music head Rama Barwick, it was their best-selling release. Padilla's “The South Beach Experience” on the Ultra Records label was released on October 3, 2000.

== Later life ==
During the first week of December in 2012 Padilla suffered three successive strokes leaving him partially paralyzed.
