= Carbonell Awards =

Annual theater awards in South Florida, US

The Carbonell Awards
- Awarded for: Theater and Arts in South Florida
- Description: The Carbonell Awards fosters the artistic growth of professional theater in South Florida by celebrating the diversity of our theater artists, providing educational scholarships, and building audience appreciation and civic pride by highlighting achievements of our theater community.
- Date: November 13, 2023
- Venue: Lauderhill Performing Arts Center
- Eligibility: Begins October 1, 2022 Ends September 1, 2023
- Hosted by: Michael McKeever Stuart Meltzer
- Established: 1975
- First award: November 15, 1976
- Final award: November 13, 2022
- Website: http://carbonellawards.org/
- Related: Tony Awards

The Carbonell Awards recognize excellent theater in the South Florida region of the United States annually. The awards are named after the sculptor Manuel Carbonell, who designed the bronze and marble award that is given to the winners. Voting is conducted by three panels of ten members each. The program additionally awards college scholarships of $1,000 each to deserving high school students in South Florida. In 2020, the Carbonell Awards were cancelled due to COVID-19. Since 2021, the Carbonell Award have been held at the Lauderhill Performing Arts Center.

Awards are given "to recognize and honor excellence in theater and the arts" in the following categories:

- Best New Work (award to author)
- Best Ensemble
- Best Play Production (award to producing theater)
- Best Play Director
- Best Play Actor
- Best Play Actress
- Best Play Supporting Actor
- Best Play Supporting Actress
- Best Musical Production (award to producing theater)
- Best Musical Director
- Best Musical Actor
- Best Musical Actress
- Best Musical Supporting Actor
- Best Musical Supporting Actress
- Best Musical Direction
- Best Musical Choreography
- Best Scenic Design
- Best Lighting
- Best Costumes
- Best Sound
- Best Non-Resident Play Production (award to producing theater)
- Best Non-Resident Play Director
- Best Non-Resident Play Actor
- Best Non-Resident Play Actress
- Best Non-Resident Play Supporting Actor
- Best Non-Resident Play Supporting Actress
