= Moisés Kaufman =

Venezuelan-American theater director, filmmaker and playwright

- Kaufman in 2026
- Born: November 21, 1963 (age 62); Caracas, Venezuela
- Education: Metropolitan University; New York University (BFA)
- Occupations: theatre director, playwright

Moisés Kaufman (born November 21, 1963) is a Venezuelan American theater director, filmmaker, playwright, founder of Tectonic Theater Project based in New York City, and co-founder of Miami New Drama at the Colony Theatre. He was awarded the 2016 National Medal of Arts by President Barack Obama. He is best known for creating The Laramie Project (2000) with other members of Tectonic Theater Project. He has directed extensively on Broadway and Internationally, and is the author of numerous plays, including Gross Indecency: The Three Trials of Oscar Wilde and 33 Variations.

Born and raised in Caracas, Venezuela, he moved as a young man to New York City in 1987.

== Biography ==
Kaufman is of Romanian-Jewish and Ukrainian-Jewish descent, and was born in Caracas, Venezuela. He is an alumnus of Venezuela's Universidad Metropolitana, where he began to study theatre. After immigrating to the United States, he went to college in New York and graduated from NYU.

In 2005 he described himself in an interview by saying, "I am Venezuelan, I am Jewish, I am gay, I live in New York. I am the sum of all my cultures. I couldn't write anything that didn't incorporate all that I am."

Kaufman was awarded a Guggenheim Fellowship in 2002, following the premiere of The Laramie Project, which was based on extensive interviews with residents and commentators in and around Wyoming who were involved with the aftermath of the murder of gay student Matthew Shepard.

He made his Broadway directing debut in the 2004 production of I Am My Own Wife by Doug Wright, for which he received a Tony Award nomination for Best Direction of a Play.

On September 22, 2016, Kaufman was awarded the National Medal of Arts and Humanities in a ceremony conducted by U.S. president Barack Obama. He is the first Venezuelan to receive the honor.

In 2022, Kaufman was included in the book 50 Key Figures in Queer US Theatre, profiled in a chapter written by theatre scholar Bess Rowen.

== Stage credits ==
=== As playwright ===
- Gross Indecency: The Three Trials of Oscar Wilde (1997)
- The Laramie Project (2000)
- 33 Variations (2009)
- One Arm (2011) (adaptation)
- London Mosquitoes (2011)
- Here There Are Blueberries (2018)
- Greed (2021)

=== As director ===
- Women in Beckett (1991)
- The Nest (1994)
- Marlowe's Eyes (1996)
- Gross Indecency: The Three Trials of Oscar Wilde (1997)
- The Laramie Project (2000)
- I Am My Own Wife (2003, his Broadway debut)
- Master Class (2004) with Rita Moreno
- Lady Windermere's Fan (2005)
- This Is How It Goes (2005) (Donmar Warehouse) starring Ben Chaplin
- Macbeth (2006) (The Public Theater's Shakespeare in the Park) starring Liev Schreiber
- 33 Variations (2009) (Broadway) starring Jane Fonda
- Into the Woods (2009)
- Puss in Boots (El Gato con Botas) (2010)
- Bengal Tiger at the Baghdad Zoo (2011) (Broadway) starring Robin Williams
- One Arm (2011)
- The Nightingale (2012)
- The Heiress (2012) (Broadway) with Jessica Chastain
- Torch Song (2018) (Broadway)
- Paradise Square (2018) (Berkeley Rep, Chicago, Broadway)
- Here There Are Blueberries (2018)
- Seven Deadly Sins (2021)

== Film and television credits ==
- The Laramie Project (2002)
- The L Word (2006–07, 2 episodes)

== Awards ==
- 1997 Joe A. Callaway Award for excellence in directing: Gross Indecency: The Three Trials of Oscar Wilde
- 1998 Lucille Lortel Award Outstanding Play: Gross Indecency: The Three Trials of Oscar Wilde
- Bay Area Theater Critics Circle Award: Gross Indecency: The Three Trials of Oscar Wilde
- 2002 Primetime Emmy Award Nomination Best Director: The Laramie Project (HBO)
- 2002 Primetime Emmy Award Nomination Best Writing (with the members of Tectonic Theater): The Laramie Project (HBO)
- 2002 Golden Bear Award from the Berlin Film Festival: The Laramie Project (HBO)
- 2002 National Board of Review Award for Outstanding Made for Television Movie: The Laramie Project (HBO)
- 2002 Humanitas Prize: The Laramie Project (HBO)
- 2002 GLAAD Media Award: The Laramie Project (HBO)
- 2004 Obie Award Best Director: I Am My Own Wife
- 2004 Tony Award Nomination Best Director: I Am My Own Wife
- 2004 Lucille Lortel Award Outstanding Director: I Am My Own Wife
- 2007 Edgerton New American Play Award 33 Variations
- 2008 Harold and Mimi Steinberg / American Theatre Critics Association New Play Award.[10]: 33 Variations
- 2009 Tony Award Nomination Best Play: 33 Variations
- 2016 National Medal of Arts given by President Barack Obama
- 2024 Pulitzer Prize Finalist in Drama: Here There Are Blueberries
- 2024 Helen Hayes Award Best Direction: Here There Are Blueberries Shakespeare Theater Company
- 2024 Hispanic Organization of Latin Actors Outstanding Achievement in Directing: Here There Are Blueberries
- 2024 Carbonell Award: Las Aventuras de Juan Planchard
- 2024 37th Annual Erwin Piscator Award
- 2025 Lucille Lortel Award Outstanding Play: Here There Are Blueberries
- Guggenheim Fellowship
- Lambda Book Award
- Venezuela's Casa del Artista
- American Library Association's LGBT Literature Award
- Matthew Shepard Foundation's "Making A Difference Award"
- Artistic Integrity Award from the Human Rights Campaign
- Carbonell Award

== See also ==
- List of gay, lesbian or bisexual people: K
