= Diego Collado (missionary) =

Spanish missionary

- Born: c. 1587; Extremadura, Spain
- Died: 1638 (or 1641, sources differ) at sea, near the Philippines
- Title: Friar

Diego Collado (Latin name: Didacus Colladus; c. 1587 - 1638 or 1641) was a Spanish Christian missionary. He was born at Miajadas, in the province of Extremadura, Spain. He entered the Dominican Order at San Esteban, Salamanca around 1600, and in 1619 went to Japan. As Christianity had already been formally outlawed by Tokugawa Ieyasu in 1614, Collado spent his time in hiding, frequently changing residences to avoid being arrested. He traveled the country, learning Japanese and proselytizing to the local population, until he was recalled to Europe in 1622. He spent the next decade challenging the monopoly of the Jesuits in ministering to Japan, and his account of the venal behavior he observed in Japan was cited by Thomas Gage, a former Dominican friar turned Protestant, as evidence of Jesuit malpractice and the conflict between Dominicans and Jesuits.

In an effort to aid the preparation of future missionaries, Collado published a Japanese grammar and vocabulary as well as a confessionary in 1632 while in Rome, which were the first ever to be translated into Ecclesiastical Latin. He was able to return to Asia in 1635, but faced resistance from the established Dominicans there due to his more strident views. He was ultimately rebuked in his attempts to advocate for a new mission to Japan, and was recalled to Spain. But before he could depart the Philippines, his ship capsized and he drowned.

== Works ==
- Señor. Fray Diego Collado de la Orden de S. Domingo Procurador de Iapon por la dicha su Orden. Dize, que en virtud de vn Breve expedido en Roma à 11. de Iunio del año de 1608. por la Santidad de Paulo V. [...] en que su Santidad dà licencia para que los Religiosos de las Ordenes Mendicantes entren en los Reynos de China, y Iapon, y los demas adjacentes por qualquiera via que pueda. 1626 (scan, scan)
- Ars grammaticae Iaponicae linguae. Rome 1632 (scan; Project Gutenberg: Latin text, English translation)
- Niffon no cotõbani yô Confesion, vo mósu yõdai / Modus confitendi et examinandi poenitentem Iaponensem (Japanese and Latin). Rome 1632 (scan)
- Dictionarium sive thesauri linguae Iaponicae compendium (Latin, Spanish and Japanese). Rome 1632 (scan)
- Dictionarium linguae Sinensis cum explicatione Latina et Hispanica charactere Sinensi et Latino (Latin, Spanish and Chinese). 1632 – not actually published
- Historia eclesiastica de los sucessos de la Christiandad de Iapon, desde el año de 1602. que entro en el la Orden de Predicadores, hasta el de 1620. Compuesta por el Padre Fray Iacinto Orfanel [...]. Y Añadida hasta el fin del año de 1622. por el Padre Fray Diego Collado [...]. Madrid 1633 (scan, scan)
- Señor. Fray Diego Collado de la Orden de Predicadores digo: [...]. S.l., [1633?] (scan, scan)
