= Gross Indecency: The Three Trials of Oscar Wilde =

1997 play written and directed by Moisés Kaufman

Gross Indecency: The Three Trials of Oscar Wilde is a 1997 play written and directed by Moisés Kaufman. It deals with Oscar Wilde's three trials on the matter of his relationship with Lord Alfred Douglas and other men.

== Background ==
Homosexuality was illegal in 1890s United Kingdom. Wilde had a relationship with Lord Alfred Douglas, a younger man, whose father wanted it to end. Following a failed private prosecution for criminal libel that Wilde brought against Douglas's father, the Marquess of Queensberry, for statements he had made accusing Wilde of sodomy, Wilde was charged with "committing acts of gross indecency with other male persons".

The first trial was brought by Wilde for libel, while the second and third trials against Wilde were for "gross indecency". The jury at the second trial did not reach a verdict; at the third trial, Wilde was convicted and sentenced to hard labour.

Kaufman created the play from extensive research and uses quotes from "contemporary court documents, newspaper accounts and books by and about Wilde," openly referring to his sources by sometimes having actors read from them on stage.

== Original Cast ==
- Michael Emerson – Oscar Wilde
- Bill Dawes – Lord Alfred Douglas
- Robert Blumenfeld – His father, Douglas, the Marquess of Queensberry
- Trevor Anthony – lawyer for prosecution
- John McAdams – lawyer for defense

The following actors play multiple parts and at times serve as a chorus

- Andy Paris
- Greg Pierotti
- Troy Sostillio
- Greg Steinbruner

== Performances ==
Gross Indecency: The Three Trials of Oscar Wilde premiered Off-Broadway on February 27, 1997, at the Greenwich House. After a rave review by Ben Brantley of The New York Times, it sold out and the run was extended. It ran there until May 5 and then transferred to the commercial Minetta Lane Theatre, also Off-Broadway, opening in June 1997.

The play also opened on the West Coast that year, in November 1997 at San Francisco's Theatre on the Square. It later received two critically acclaimed productions in Los Angeles: the first was at the Mark Taper Forum in 1998, following the New York premiere. More than 10 years later, Susan Lee directed a revival at the Eclectic Theatre in 2009.

== See also ==
- The Trials of Oscar Wilde, 1960 film dramatizing the same legal proceedings
