= Larmes de couteau =

Opera by Bohuslav Martinů

Larmes de couteau, H. 169, Knife tears, Czech Slzy nože, is a one-act opera by Bohuslav Martinů to a French libretto by Georges Ribemont-Dessaignes. Composed in Paris in March 1928, it was not premiered until October 1969 at the State Theatre, Brno. The plot contains surreal and grotesque elements, and the music demonstrates the composer's then preoccupation with jazz both in orchestration and musical language.

== Background ==
Martinů's first opera Voják a tanečnice (Soldier and Dancer) of 1927 was a comic work in three acts, revealing his eclectic theatrical instincts. In Paris he became friends with the artist, poet and playwright Ribemont-Dessaignes who was part of the Surrealist movement in the city. As a composer, some of Ribemont-Dessaignes' piano works, written using a roulette wheel, had been heard at a Dadaist performance in the Salle Gaveau. Composer and librettist met when Ribemont-Dessaignes's work had just been translated into Czech. Ribemont-Dessaignes created the libretto for Martinů's second opera Larmes de couteau. The work was refused by the Baden-Baden Festival, mainly on account of its text, after which Martinů and Ribemont-Dessaignes immediately began a second collaboration, on Les trois souhaits, which was completed soon after in May 1929. Likewise Universal-Edition rejected the score.

The orchestration for the 20-minute opera is a 14-piece jazz orchestra consisting of oboe, clarinet, alto saxophone, bassoon, two each of trumpets and trombones, a tam-tam, banjo, piano, two violins, and cello, plus an accordion in the wings.

== Performance history ==
The premiere took place at the Národní divadlo (national theatre) Brno on 22 October 1969 with Jaroslava Janská (soprano) as Eleonore, Libuše Lesmanová (mezzo) as the mother, and René Tuček (baritone) as Satan; Václav Nosek conducted. The opera has been performed since by Neuköllner Oper Berlin in a double-bill with Alexandre bis in 1998, by Henry Street Chamber Opera in New York, with The Voice of the Forest in 2002, and at the Comedy Theatre in Prague with Ariane in 2004. Its British premiere was on 1 May 2007 on a triple bill at The Film Studios, Covent Garden by Second Movement Opera conducted by Nicholas Chalmers. Long Beach Opera presented it with another surreal opera Les Mamelles de Tirésias in 2012.

It was filmed for Czech television in 1998, directed by Jiří Nekvasil.

== Synopsis ==
In the middle of the stage is a hanged man – the neighbour Saturn. A woman and her daughter Eleonore chat about music to the sound of a waltz on the accordion. Before they a quarrel develops, Eleonore spots the hanged man and falls instantly in love with him. Her mother scolds her, and reminds her that today the handsome Mr Satan, who excites all the women is to come; Satan arrives with a bouquet gathered from graves of immortal lovers, and declares his love for both women. Eleonore remains true to her hanged man. So Satan marries Eleonore and the hanged man in front of the assembled neighbours.

Alone with her newly-wed husband she cannot get him to reciprocate her ardour; Satan reappears, showing Eleonore how his heart beats but Eleonore nervously dismisses him. He then returns in the form of a black bicycle racer, and Eleonore considers flirting with him to arouse her husband's jealousy. Her mother also takes a liking to the cyclist. But the cyclist's head cracks and the devil's face is visible; Eleonora is horrified while her mother is unmoved.

Eleonore in despair at her failure to arouse her hanged husband stabs herself. The mother returns to find Eleonore dead and accuses the hanged man of murder. His rope breaks, the hanged man falls, comes back to life and bends over Eleonore, whereupon she also revives. She declares her love for the hanged man and the two embrace. Their mother with pleasure. The hanged man's head bursts open revealing Satan, and Eleonore clutches her heart. Even mother is frightened of the devil, but has to admit that he is attractive. Satan blows kisses to both and flees. The mother laments the adulterer, while Eleonore cries: "I am a poor misunderstood woman!".

== Recordings ==
- (in Czech) with Hana Jonášová, Lenka Smídová and Roman Janál, the Prague Philharmonia conducted by Jiří Bělohlávek - recorded 1998, Supraphon
- (in French) with Elena Tsallagova, Maria Riccarda Wesseling and Adam Palka, the Staatsorchester Stuttgart, conducted by Cornelius Meister - recorded 2020, Capriccio
