= Colony Theatre =

Performing arts venue in Florida, US

Coordinates: 25.79029°N 80.13979°W

The Colony Theatre is a performing arts venue located on Lincoln Road in Miami, Florida. The theatre first opened as a Paramount Pictures movie house in 1935 with a capacity to sit 1,200 people. From the 1950s - 1990s, it functioned back and forth as a movie house and a live performance space. As of 2020, the Colony Theatre is a 417-seat performance venue managed by South Florida theater company, Miami New Drama. It hosts music, dance, and theater performances as well as Miami New Drama's theatrical season.

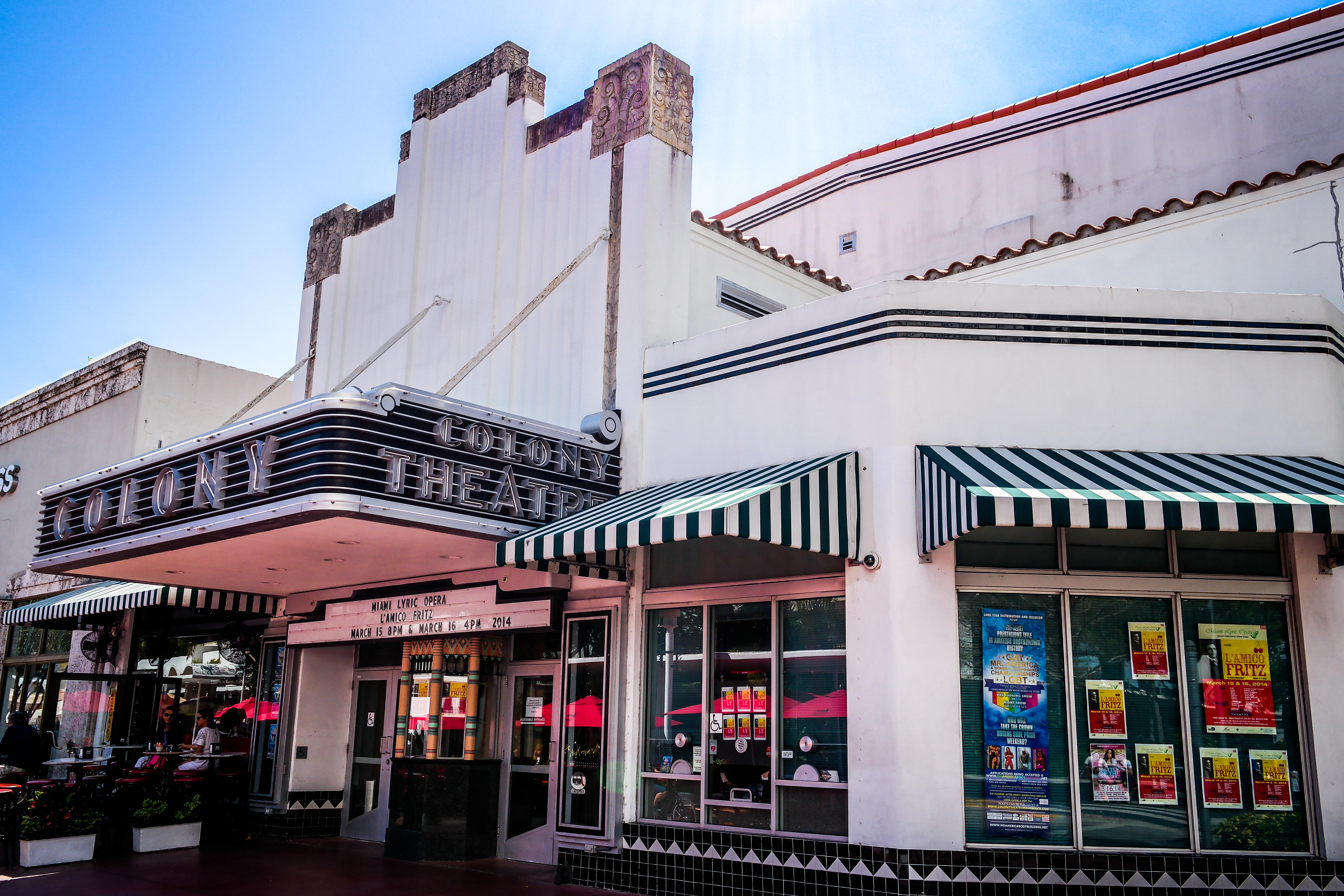
The Colony Theatre in 2014

== History ==
=== Early years ===
Paramount Pictures built the Colony Theatre in the 1930s, an Art Deco movie house on Miami Beach's Lincoln Road. At the time, the theatre was known to many as the "Beauty Queen." The opening night of the movie theatre was said to be well attended, with guest appearances from movie stars such as Carole Lombard. Notable films that played at the movie house included Alfie, The Sound of Music, Doctor Zhivago, and The Great Race.

==== 1950s ====
The theatre is transformed from a movie house into a live performance venue.

==== 1960s ====
Architect, Morris Lapidus, remodels all of Lincoln Road in Miami Modern style of architecture, and the theatre goes back to being a movie house.

==== 1970s ====
Samuel Kipnis purchases the theatre in 1971, and hosts the Greater Miami Educational Cultural Series, a non-profit organization that supplied films from his private library.

==== 1980s ====
Miami City Ballet takes over operations of the Colony Theatre, turning it into a live performance space.

=== Renovation and new management ===
In 2006, under the ownership of the City of Miami Beach, the Colony Theatre underwent a $6.5 million renovation to return it to its original Art Deco style and update stage and technical equipment such as lighting, rigging, and sound equipment. Under the city's ownership, the theatre was used as a rental space for live performances such as theatrical productions, music concerts, and dance recitals. On October 1 of 2016, the City of Miami Beach announced that Miami New Drama, under the Artistic Direction of Michel Hausmann, was taking over operations of the Colony Theatre. Since then, the Colony Theatre was named the 2018 Miami New Times Best Theater for Drama, and Miami New Drama won two Knights Arts Challenge awards and a Knights New Works Miami award from the John S. and James L. Knight Foundation. The Colony Theatre has also collaborated with national organizations such as Asolo Repertory Theatre and Tectonic Theatre Project.

== Management ==
As of 2020, Michel Hausmann is the artistic director of Miami New Drama, the resident theater company at the Colony Theatre. The managing director is Nicholas Richberg, the General Manager is Stefanie Anarumo, and the Director of Education is Vyana Preti. https://miaminewdrama.org/about/mind-team/
