= Axel Beer =

German musicologist

Axel Beer (born 17 February 1956) is a German musicologist. He has been teaching at the Johannes Gutenberg University Mainz since 1995.

Born in Fulda, Beer studied musicology, Latin philology and auxiliary sciences of history at the Johann-Wolfgang-Goethe-Universität Frankfurt am Main (class 1987).

== Publications ==
- Die Annahme des "stile nuovo" in der katholischen Kirchenmusik Süddeutschlands, Tutzing, Schneider, 1989, 378 pages
- Heinrich Joseph Wassermann (1791-1838). Lebensweg und Schaffen. Ein Blick in das Musikleben des frühen 19. Jahrhunderts, Hamburg-Eisenach, Wagner, 1991, 256 pages
- (edited with Laurenz Lütteken) Festschrift Klaus Hortschansky zum 60. Geburtstag, Tutzing, Schneider 1995
- Musik zwischen Komponist, Verlag und Publikum. Die Rahmenbedingungen des Musikschaffens in Deutschland im ersten Drittel des 19. Jahrhunderts, Tutzing, Schneider, 2000, 561 pages
- Johann Franz Xaver Sterkel's Briefwechsel mit seinen Verlegern, Mainz, Schott, 2001, 138 pages; together with Dagmar Schnell
- "Empfehlenswerthe Musikalien". Besprechungen musikalischer Neuerscheinungen außerhalb der Fachpresse (Deutschland, 1. Hälfte des 19. Jahrhunderts). Eine Bibliographie, first part, Göttingen-London, Hainholz, 2000, 353 pages; Second part ebd. 2001, 353 pages
- "Die Oper daheim. Variationen als Rezeptionsform; Verzeichnis der Variationswerke über Themen aus Weigls Schweizer Familie". In Hans-Joachim Hinrichsen, Klaus Pietschmann (editors): Jenseits der Bühne. Bearbeitungs- und Rezeptionsformen der Oper im 19. und 20. Jahrhundert (Schweizer Beiträge zur Musikforschung; vol. 15). Bärenreiter-Verlag, Kassel 2011, p. 37–47, ISBN 978-3-7618-2199-2.
