= Bibliography of the Ottoman Empire =

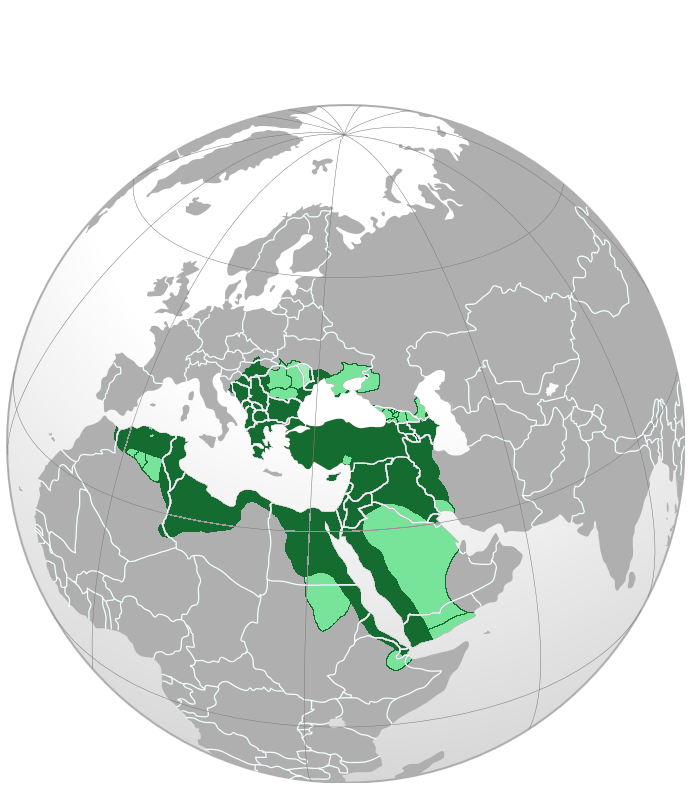

This is a bibliography of notable works about the Ottoman Empire.

== Encyclopedias ==
- Ágoston, Gábor; Masters, Bruce, eds. (2009). Encyclopedia of the Ottoman Empire. New York: Facts On File. ISBN 978-0-8160-6259-1.

== Surveys ==
- Baram, Uzi; Carroll, Lynda, eds. (2000). A Historical Archaeology of the Ottoman Empire: Breaking New Ground. Plenum/Kluwer Academic Press.
- Barkey, Karen (2008). Empire of Difference: The Ottomans in Comparative Perspective.
- Davison, Roderic H. (1973). Reform in the Ottoman Empire, 1856–1876. New York: Gordian Press.
- Deringil, Selim (1998). The Well-Protected Domains: Ideology and the Legitimation of Power in the Ottoman Empire, 1876–1909. London: IB Tauris.
- Faroqhi, Suraiya (2009). The Ottoman Empire: A Short History.
- Finkel, Caroline (2005). Osman's Dream: The Story of the Ottoman Empire, 1300–1923. Basic Books. ISBN 978-0-465-02396-7.
- Imber, Colin (2009). The Ottoman Empire, 1300–1650: The Structure of Power (2 ed.). New York: Palgrave Macmillan. ISBN 978-0-230-57451-9.
- İnalcık, Halil (2013) [1973]. The Ottoman Empire, the Classical Age: 1300–1600. Hachette UK.
- Kitsikis, Dimitri (1994). L'Empire ottoman (in French) (3rd ed.). Presses Universitaires de France. ISBN 2-13-043459-2.
- Kunt, I. Metin (ed.). The Cambridge History of Turkey. Vol. 1–4.
  - Faroqhi, Suraiya, ed. (2006). The Cambridge History of Turkey. Vol. 3: The Later Ottoman Empire, 1603–1839. doi:10.1017/CHOL9780521620956. ISBN 978-0-521-62095-6.
  - Faroqhi, Suraiya; Fleet, Kate, eds. (2012). The Cambridge History of Turkey. Vol. 2: The Ottoman Empire as a World Power, 1453–1603. doi:10.1017/CHO9781139049047. ISBN 978-1-139-04904-7.
  - Fleet, Kate, ed. (2009). The Cambridge History of Turkey. Vol. 1: Byzantium to Turkey 1071–1453. doi:10.1017/CHOL9780521620932. ISBN 978-0-521-62093-2.
  - Kasaba, Reşat, ed. (2008). The Cambridge History of Turkey. Vol. 4. doi:10.1017/CHOL9780521620963. ISBN 978-0-521-62096-3.
- McCarthy, Justin (1997). The Ottoman Turks: An Introductory History to 1923. Longman. ISBN 978-0-582-25655-2.
- McMeekin, Sean (2010). The Berlin-Baghdad Express: The Ottoman Empire and Germany's Bid for World Power. Cambridge, MA: Belknap Press of Harvard University Press. ISBN 978-0-674-05739-5.
- Pamuk, Şevket (2000). A Monetary History of the Ottoman Empire. New York: Cambridge University Press.
- Pippidi, Andrei (2013). Visions of the Ottoman World in Renaissance Europe. Hurst. ISBN 978-1-84904-199-7.
- Quataert, Donald (2005). The Ottoman Empire, 1700–1922. Cambridge University Press. ISBN 978-0-521-54782-6.
- Shaw, Stanford J.; Shaw, Ezel Kural (1977). History of the Ottoman Empire and Modern Turkey. Vol. 1: Empire of the Gazis: the rise and decline of the Ottoman Empire, 1280–1808. Cambridge University Press. ISBN 978-0-521-21280-9.
- Somel, Selçuk Akşin (2003). Historical Dictionary of the Ottoman Empire. Lanham, MD: Scarecrow Press. ISBN 978-0-8108-4332-5.
- Uyar, Mesut; Erickson, Edward (2009). A Military History of the Ottomans: From Osman to Atatürk. Abc-Clio. ISBN 978-0-275-98876-0.

== The Early Ottomans (1300–1453) ==
- Kafadar, Cemal (1995). Between Two Worlds: The Construction of the Ottoman State. University of California Press. ISBN 978-0-520-20600-7.
- Lindner, Rudi P. (1983). Nomads and Ottomans in Medieval Anatolia. Bloomington: Indiana University Press. ISBN 0-933070-12-8.
- Lowry, Heath (2003). The Nature of the Early Ottoman State. Albany: SUNY Press. ISBN 0-7914-5636-6.
- Zachariadou, Elizabeth, ed. (1991). The Ottoman Emirate (1300–1389). Rethymnon: Crete University Press.

== The Era of Transformation (1550–1700) ==
- Abou-El-Haj, Rifa'at Ali (1984). The 1703 Rebellion and the Structure of Ottoman Politics. Uitgaven van het Nederlands Historisch-Archaeologisch Instituut te İstanbul. Vol. 52. Nederlands Historisch-Archaeologisch Instituut te İstanbul. ISBN 978-90-6258-052-1.
- Howard, Douglas A. (1988). "Ottoman Historiography and the Literature of 'Decline' of the Sixteenth and Seventeenth Century". Journal of Asian History. 22: 52–77. JSTOR 41932017.
- Kunt, Metin İ. (1983). The Sultan's Servants: The Transformation of Ottoman Provincial Government, 1550–1650. New York: Columbia University Press. ISBN 978-0-231-05578-9.
- Peirce, Leslie (1993). The Imperial Harem: Women and Sovereignty in the Ottoman Empire. Oxford: Oxford University Press. ISBN 978-0-19-508677-5.
- Tezcan, Baki (2010). The Second Ottoman Empire: Political and Social Transformation in the Early Modern World. Cambridge: Cambridge University Press. ISBN 978-1-107-41144-9.
- White, Joshua M. (2017). Piracy and Law in the Ottoman Mediterranean. Stanford: Stanford University Press. ISBN 978-1-503-60252-6.

== to 1830 ==
- Braude, Benjamin; Lewis, Bernard, eds. (1982). Christians and Jews in the Ottoman Empire: The Functioning of a Plural Society. New York: Holmes & Meier Publishers.
  - Braude, Benjamin; Lewis, Bernard, eds. (1982). Christians and Jews in the Ottoman Empire: The Functioning of a Plural Society. Vol. 1: The central lands. New York: Holmes & Meier Publishers. ISBN 978-0-8419-0519-1.
  - Braude, Benjamin; Lewis, Bernard, eds. (1982). Christians and Jews in the Ottoman Empire: The Functioning of a Plural Society. Vol. 2: The Arabic-speaking lands. New York: Holmes & Meier Publishers. ISBN 978-0-8419-0520-7.
- Cassels, Lavender (1966). The Struggle for the Ottoman Empire, 1717–1740. John Murray. LCCN 66077371.
- Goffman, Daniel (2002). The Ottoman Empire and Early Modern Europe. doi:10.1017/CBO9780511818844. ISBN 978-0-521-45280-9.
- Guilmartin, John F. Jr. (Spring 1988). "Ideology and Conflict: The Wars of the Ottoman Empire, 1453–1606". Journal of Interdisciplinary History. 18 (4): 721–747. doi:10.2307/204822. JSTOR 204822.
- Kunt, Metin; Woodhead, Christine, eds. (1995). Süleyman the Magnificent and His Age: The Ottoman Empire in the Early Modern World. Longman. ISBN 978-0-582-03828-8.
- Parry, V. J.; Cook, Michael (1976). A History of the Ottoman Empire to 1730: Chapters from the Cambridge history of Islam and the New Cambridge modern history. Cambridge University Press.
- Şahin, Kaya (2013). Empire and Power in the Reign of Süleyman: Narrating the Sixteenth-Century Ottoman World. Cambridge University Press. ISBN 978-1-107-03442-6.
- Shaw, Stanford J. (1976). History of the Ottoman Empire and Modern Turkey. Vol. I: Empire of Gazis: The Rise and Decline of the Ottoman Empire 1290–1808. Cambridge University Press. ISBN 978-0-521-21280-9.

== Post 1830 ==
- Ahmad, Feroz (1969). The Young Turks: The Committee of Union and Progress in Turkish Politics, 1908–1914. Oxford: Clarendon Press. ISBN 978-0-19-821475-5.
- Bein, Amit (2011). Ottoman Ulema, Turkish Republic: Agents of Change and Guardians of Tradition. Stanford: Stanford University Press. ISBN 978-0-8047-7311-9.
- Black, Cyril E.; Brown, L. Carl, eds. (1992). Modernization in the Middle East: The Ottoman Empire and Its Afro-Asian Successors. Darwin Press. ISBN 978-0-87850-085-7.
- Erickson, Edward J. (2000). Ordered to Die: A History of the Ottoman Army in the First World War. Westport, CT: Greenwood Press. ISBN 978-0-313-31516-9.
- Faroqhi, Suraiya (2000). Subjects of the Sultan: Culture and Daily Life in the Ottoman Empire. I.B. Tauris. ISBN 978-1-86064-289-0.
- Findley, Carter V. (1980). Bureaucratic Reform in the Ottoman Empire: The Sublime Porte, 1789–1922. Princeton University Press. ISBN 978-0-691-05288-5.
- Fortna, Benjamin C. (2002). Imperial Classroom: Islam, the State, and Education in the Late Ottoman Empire. Oxford University Press. ISBN 978-0-19-924840-7.
- Fromkin, David (2001). A Peace to End All Peace: The Fall of the Ottoman Empire and the Creation of the Modern Middle East. New York: H. Holt. ISBN 978-0-8050-6884-9.
- Gingeras, Ryan (2022). The Last Days of the Ottoman Empire. London: Allen Lane. ISBN 978-0-241-44432-0.
- Göçek, Fatma Müge (1996). Rise of the Bourgeoisie, Demise of Empire: Ottoman Westernization and Social Change. New York: Oxford University Press. ISBN 978-0-19-509925-6.
- Gürkan, Emrah Safa (2011). "Christian Allies of the Ottoman Empire". European History Online. Mainz: Institute of European History.
- Hanioğlu, M. Şükrü (2008). A Brief History of the Late Ottoman Empire. Princeton: Princeton University Press. ISBN 978-0-691-13452-9.
- İnalcık, Halil; Quataert, Donald, eds. (1994). An Economic and Social History of the Ottoman Empire, 1300–1914. Cambridge University Press. ISBN 978-0-521-34315-2.
- Karpat, Kemal H. (2001). The Politicization of Islam: Reconstructing Identity, State, Faith, and Community in the Late Ottoman State. New York: Oxford University Press. ISBN 978-0-19-513618-0.
- Kayalı, Hasan (1997). Arabs and Young Turks: Ottomanism, Arabism, and Islamism in the Ottoman Empire, 1908–1918. Berkeley: University of California Press. ISBN 978-0-520-20446-1.
- Kieser, Hans-Lukas; Anderson, Margaret Lavinia; Bayraktar, Seyhan; Schmutz, Thomas, eds. (2019). The End of the Ottomans: The Genocide of 1915 and the Politics of Turkish Nationalism. London: I.B. Tauris. ISBN 978-1-78831-241-7.
- Kushner, David (1977). The Rise of Turkish Nationalism, 1876–1908. Cass. ISBN 978-0-7146-3075-5.
- McCarthy, Justin (2001). The Ottoman Peoples and the End of Empire. Hodder Arnold. ISBN 978-0-340-70657-2.
- McMeekin, Sean (2015). The Ottoman Endgame: War, Revolution and the Making of the Modern Middle East, 1908–1923. London: Allen Lane. ISBN 978-1-84614-705-0.
- Miller, William (1913). The Ottoman Empire, 1801–1913. Cambridge: The University Press. LCCN 13-013172. OCLC 2139992.
- Quataert, Donald (1983). Social disintegration and popular resistance in the Ottoman Empire, 1881-1908: reactions to European economic penetration. New York: New York University Press. ISBN 978-0-8147-6950-8.
- Rodogno, Davide (2012). Against Massacre: Humanitarian Interventions in the Ottoman Empire, 1815–1914. Princeton, NJ: Princeton University Press. ISBN 978-0-691-15133-5.
- Shaw, Stanford J.; Shaw, Ezel Kural (1977). History of the Ottoman Empire and Modern Turkey. Vol. 2: Reform, Revolution, and Republic: The Rise of Modern Turkey, 1808–1975. LCCN 76-009179.
- Swallow, Charles (1973). The Sick Man of Europe: Ottoman Empire to Turkish Republic 1789-1923. London: Ernest Benn. ISBN 978-0-510-18420-9.
- Toledano, Ehud R. (1982). The Ottoman Slave Trade and Its Suppression, 1840–1890. Princeton: Princeton University Press. ISBN 978-0-691-05369-1.

== Military ==
- Ágoston, Gábor (2005). Guns for the Sultan: Military Power and the Weapons Industry in the Ottoman Empire. Cambridge: Cambridge University Press. ISBN 978-0521843133.
- Aksan, Virginia (2007). Ottoman Wars, 1700–1860: An Empire Besieged. Pearson Education Limited. ISBN 978-0-582-30807-7.
- Rhoads, Murphey (1999). Ottoman Warfare, 1500–1700. Rutgers University Press. ISBN 1-85728-389-9.

== Historiography ==
- Emrence, Cern (2007). "Three Waves of Late Ottoman Historiography, 1950–2007". Middle East Studies Association Bulletin. 41 (2): 137–151. doi:10.1017/S0026318400050513. JSTOR 23063312. S2CID 164907427.
- Finkel, Caroline (2008). "Ottoman History: Whose History Is It?". International Journal of Turkish Studies. 14 (1): 1–10. (How historians in different countries view the Ottoman Empire)
- Hajdarpasic, Edin (2008). "Out of the Ruins of the Ottoman Empire: Reflections on the Ottoman Legacy in South-eastern Europe". Middle Eastern Studies. 44 (5): 715–734. doi:10.1080/00263200802285278. S2CID 143885046.
- Hathaway, Jane (1996). "Problems of Periodization in Ottoman History: The Fifteenth through the Eighteenth Centuries". The Turkish Studies Association Bulletin. 20: 25–31.
- Kırlı, Cengiz (May 2014). "From Economic History to Cultural History in Ottoman Studies". International Journal of Middle East Studies. 46 (2): 376–378. doi:10.1017/S0020743814000166. S2CID 146492680.
- Mikhail, Alan; Philliou, Christine M. (2012). "The Ottoman Empire and the Imperial Turn". Comparative Studies in Society and History. 54 (4): 721–745. doi:10.1017/S0010417512000394. S2CID 145194397. (Comparing the Ottomans to other empires opens new insights about the dynamics of imperial rule, periodization, and political transformation)
- Pierce, Leslie (2004). "Changing Perceptions of the Ottoman Empire: The Early Centuries". Mediterranean Historical Review. 49 (1): 6–28. doi:10.1080/0951896042000256625. S2CID 162515409. (How historians treat 1299 to 1700)

== Journal articles ==
- Mantran, Robert (1993). "L'Empire ottoman : une conception pragmatique du pouvoir". Comptes rendus des séances de l'Académie des Inscriptions et Belles-Lettres (in French). 137 (3): 757–763. doi:10.3406/crai.1993.15257. at Persée
- Reinkowski, Maurus (2003). "Double struggle, no income: Ottoman borderlands in Northern Albania". International Journal of Turkish Studies. 9: 239–253.

== See also ==
- History of the Ottoman Empire
