= Klaus Hortschansky =

German musicologist

Klaus Hortschansky (7 May 1935 – 16 May 2016) was a German musicologist.

== Life and work ==
Born in Weimar, Hortschansky studied musicology from 1953 to 1966 in Weimar, Berlin and Kiel. In 1965 he became an assistant at the Musicological Institute in Kiel, where he received his doctorate in 1966 from Anna Amalie Abert with a thesis on the topic Parody and Borrowing in the Work of Christoph Willibald Gluck. From 1968 he worked as an assistant at the Musicological Institute in Frankfurt am Main before being appointed director of the Musicological Seminar at the Westfälische Wilhelms-Universität in Münster in 1984.

Hortschansky's main areas of research were the music of the Franco-Flemish School and operas of the 18th century. From 1992 to 1997 he was president of the Gesellschaft für Musikforschung, furthermore he was editor of the Hallische Händel-Ausgabe, vice president of the Haydn-Institut in Cologne and co-editor of the Gluck-Gesamtausgabe.

Hortschansky retired at the end of the summer semester 2000, but continued to take master's and doctoral examinations until the 2010 summer semester.

Since 2001 Hortschansky has been a full member of the North Rhine-Westphalian Academy of Sciences, Humanities and the Arts. In the same year he also became a member of the Akademie gemeinnütziger Wissenschaften zu Erfurt. In the Frankfurt University Library exists the "Hortschansky Collection", microfilmed copies of about 2000 Italian opera libretti.

Hortschansky died in Münster at age 81.

== Publications ==
- Die musikalische Mischkultur im Königsberg des ausgehenden 18. Jahrhunderts, in Die Musik der Deutschen im Osten und ihre Wechselwirkungen mit den Nachbarn. Ostseeraum – Schlesien – Böhmen/Mähren – Donauraum, edited by Klaus Wolfgang Niemöller and Helmut Loos, Bonn 1994 (Deutsche Musik im Osten, vol. 5), pp. 93–111.
- Fürstbischöfe als Musikmäzene, in Telemanniana et alia musicologica. Festschrift Günter Fleischhauer zum 65. Geburtstag, edited by Dieter Gutknecht etc., Oschersleben 1995 (Michaelsteiner Forschungsbeiträge, vol. 17), pp. 34–55.
- Musik für Nordkirchen – Musik auf Nordkirchen, in Musik an Westfälischen Adelshöfen 1995. Eine Konzertreihe des WDR und des Landschaftsverbandes Westfalen Lippe, edited by Dorothea Endele etc., Münster 1995, pp. 25–31.
- Musikrezeption in der Stadt des 18. Jahrhunderts. Überlegungen zu einer Typologie, in: Studien zur Musikgeschichte. Eine Festschrift für Ludwig Finscher, edited by Annegrit Laubenthal, Kassel etc. 1995, pp. 272–279.
- Artikel Frankoflämische Musik, in Die Musik in Geschichte und Gegenwart, 2nd edition. Auflage, Sachteil vol. 3, Kassel etc. 1995, pp. 673–688.
- Libretti: Die originalen Textbücher der bis 1990 in der Gluck-Gesamtausgabe erschienenen Bühnenwerke. Textbücher verschollener Werke, edited by Klaus Hortschansky, Kassel etc. 1995 (Christoph Willibald Gluck. Sämtliche Werke, Abt. 7, 1).
- Georg Friedrich Händel – ein Lebensinhalt. Gedenkschrift für Bernd Baselt (1934–1993), edited by Klaus Hortschansky and Konstanze Musketa, Halle/S. 1995 (Schriften des Händel-Hauses in Halle, vol. 11).
- Eine Stammbucheintragung von Daniel Gottlob Türk. Halle und seine musikliebenden Studenten, in Georg Friedrich Händel – ein Lebensinhalt. Gedenkschrift für Bernd Baselt (1934–1993), edited by Klaus Hortschansky and Konstanze Musketa, Halle/S. 1995 (Schriften des Händel-Hauses in Halle, vol. 11), pp. 477–494.
- Artikel Hugenotten, in Die Musik in Geschichte und Gegenwart, 2., neubearb. Auflage, Sachteil vol. 4, Kassel etc. 1996, pp. 432–440.
- Vom Chordrama zum Oratorium. Gattungsnormen – Gattungstraditionen, in Göttinger Händel-Beiträge, Jg. 6 (1996), pp. 59–69.
- Handschriftliche Überlieferung von Instrumentalmusik am Stuttgarter Hof im 18. Jahrhundert, in Festschrift Christoph-Hellmut Mahling zum 65. Geburtstag, Vol. 1, edited by Axel Beer, Kristina Pfarr, Wolfgang Ruf, Tutzing 1997 (Mainzer Studien zur Musikwissenschaft, vol. 37), p. 573–586.
- Instrumentalmusik in Georg Friedrich Händels Oratorien, in the Händel-Jahrbuch, Jg. 42/43 (1996/1997), pp. 40–48.
- Artikel Tommaso Traetta: Sofonisba, in Pipers Enzyklopädie des Musiktheaters, vol. 6, Munich etc. 1997, p. 315–318.
- Traditionen – Neuansätze. Für Anna Amalie Abert (1906–1996), edited by Klaus Hortschansky, Tutzing 1997.
- Die g-moll-Sinfonie zur Zeit der Wiener Klassik, in Traditionen – Neuansätze. Für Anna Amalie Abert (1906–1996), edited by Klaus Hortschansky, Tutzing 1997, pp. 329–348.
- Musik in Westfalen, [Schriftenreihe] edited by Klaus Hortschansky, Münster ab 1997 (two volumes so far.).
- Die "Aria parlante" bei Händel, in Musik als Klangrede. Festschrift zum 70. Geburtstag von Günter Fleischhauer, edited by von Wolfgang Ruf, Köln 2001, pp. 70–93.
- Musik in der Residenzstadt Weimar, Leipzig 2001, edited by Klaus Hortschansky (Denkmäler mitteldeutscher Barockmusik, Serie I, vol. 1).
- Der Ring des Nibelungen in Münster, edited by Klaus Hortschansky and Berthold Warnecke, Münster 2001.
- Franz Wüllner und seine Händelaufführungen, in Händel-Jahrbuch, year. 48 (2002), pp. 199–208.
- Subskriptionen in der Publikumsforschung, in Le Concert et son public. Mutations de la vie musicale en Europe de 1780 à 1914 (France, Allemagne, Angleterre), edited by Hans Erich Bödecker etc., Paris 2003, pp. 387–401.
- Ein verkapptes Orpheus-Drama? Händels Hochzeits-Serenata "Il Parnasso in Festa per gli Sponsali di Teti e Peleo" für Prinzessin Anne und Prinz Wilhelm von Oranien (HWV 73), in Händel-Jahrbuch, Jg. 49 (2003), pp. 127–146.
- Gluck: Iphigénie en Tauride. Die Erfindung des musikalischen Klassizismus, in Meisterwerke neu gehört. Ein kleiner Kanon der Musik: 14 Werkportraits, edited by Hans-Joachim Hinrichsen and Laurenz Lütteken, Kassel etc.. 2004, pp. 81–104.
- Händels Opern-Ouvertüren – Exempel des vermischten Geschmacks? Überlegungen anhand von Charles Burneys verstreuten Bemerkungen, in Händel-Jahrbuch, Jg. 50 (2004), pp. 197–210.
- als Herausgeber: Wagner's Ring des Nibelungen. Musikalische Dramaturgie – Kulturelle Kontextualität – Primär-Rezeption (Schriften zur Musikwissenschaft aus Münster, vol. 20), Schneverdingen 2004.

== Students ==
- Axel Beer, professor at the Universität Mainz
- Michele Calella, professor at the Universität Wien
- Anselm Gerhard, professor of musicology and Direktor des Instituts für Musikwissenschaft at the Universität Bern
- Dietrich Helms, professor of musicology at the Universität Osnabrück
- Ralf Martin Jäger, professor for Ethnomusicology and European Music History an of the Westfälische Wilhelms-Universität
- Jin-Ah Kim, musicologist, honorary professor at the Humboldt-Universität Berlin
- Laurenz Lütteken, professor in Zürich
- Gudula Schütz, Lecturer by Bärenreiter-Verlag Kassel
- Ludger Stühlmeyer, music director ACV, composer and musicologist
- Yvonne Wasserloos, professor of musicology at the Mozarteum Salzburg
- Michael Zywietz, musicology professor at the Hochschule für Künste Bremen
