= Theater Münster =

Building in North Rhine-Westphalia, Germany

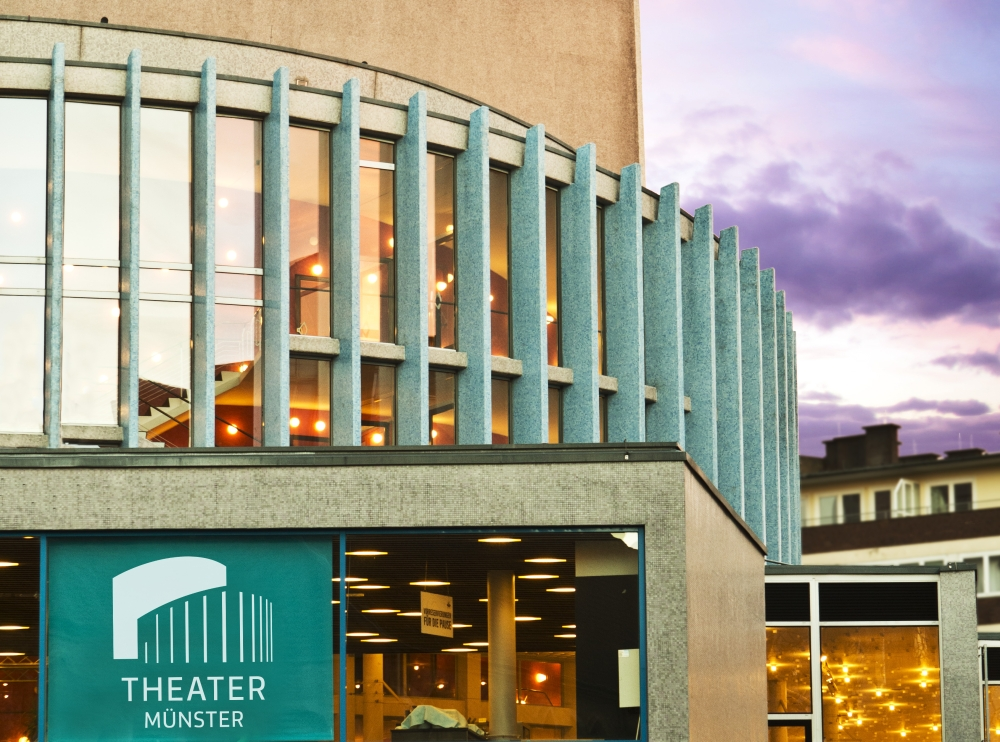
- Exterior
- Interactive map of Theater Münster
- Former names: Städtische Bühnen Münster
- Address: Münster, North Rhine-Westphalia; Germany
- Coordinates: 51°57′53″N 7°37′44″E
- Owner: City of Münster

Construction
- Opened: 4 February 1956

Website
- www.theater-muenster.com

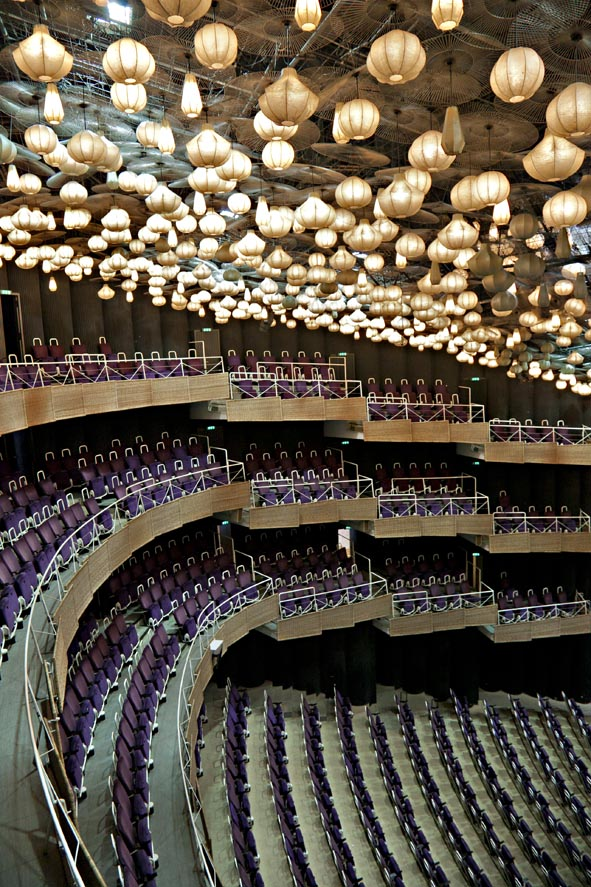
Interior of the Großes Haus

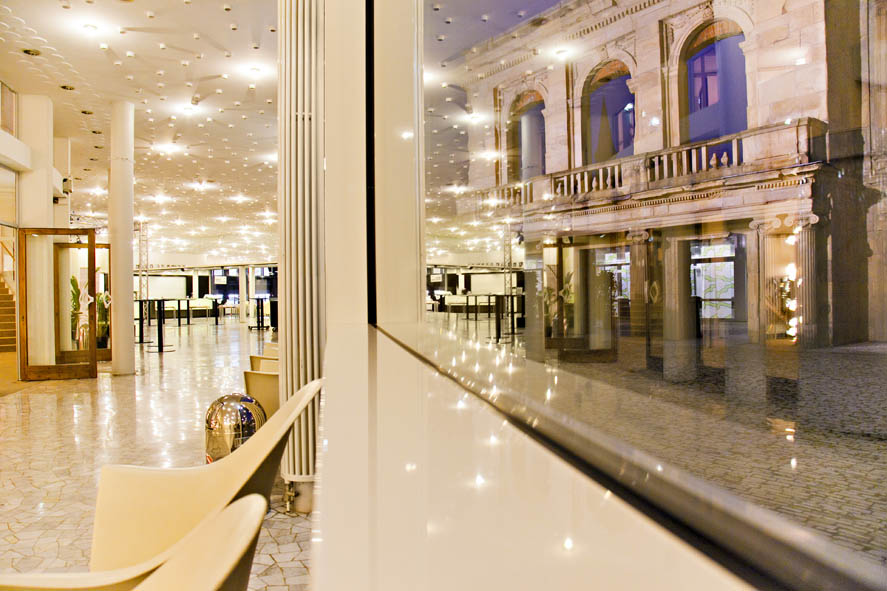
The Foyer with a view to the ruin in the courtyeard

Theater Münster (formerly: Städtische Bühnen Münster) is a municipal theatre in Münster, North Rhine-Westphalia, Germany, for plays and music theatre (opera, operetta, musical, ballet). When it opened in 1956 it was regarded as the first new theatre building in Germany after World War II. It integrates some ruins of the former theatre and musical school destroyed in the war.

The company performs music theatre, plays and theatre for young people (Junges Theater). Concert series of the orchestra Sinfonieorchester Münster also take place in its hall. The program includes further productions of the Niederdeutsche Bühne (Low German stage), guest performances, lectures and exhibitions.

== History ==
The Stadttheater building was one of the first new theatre buildings in Germany after World War II. It was built between 1952 and 1956 by a team of young architects, when Hermann Wedekind was the intendant. The architects designed a paraboloid stage tower and a rising hall with three tiers. Elements such as spiral stairs and thin supports were supposed to add to a sensitive elegance, in opposition to traditional theatre building. When it opened on 4 February 1956 it was regarded as the first new theatre building in the Bundesrepublik and received international attention. It was a landmark for culture and architecture for the town and the region. On the site, the war had left only remnants of former buildings: a municipal hall, music school and a theatre. Some ruins of the Romberger Hof, the former music school, were integrated in the new structure, also two sycamore trees that had survived were made part of the new courtyard. In September 2012, the theatre's name was changed to Theater Münster.

== Program ==
Performances are held in three venues, Großes Haus (Large hall), the variable Kleines Haus (Small hall) and the new U2. Every season offers around 30 new productions and 600 performances, from classical to premieres of new works. The symphony orchestra plays around 80 concerts per season.

== Theatre managers ==
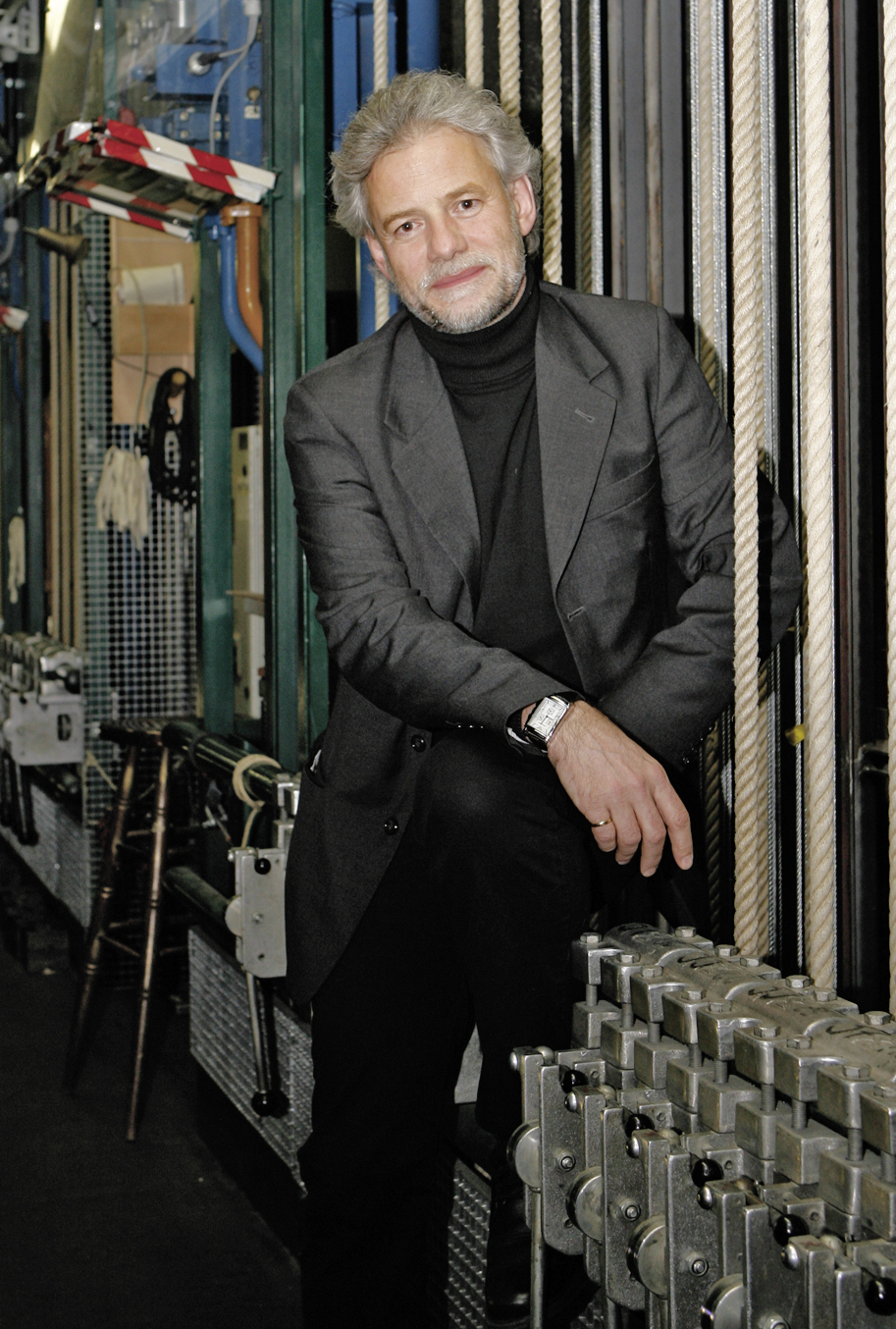
Ulrich Peters, theatre manager of the Theater Münster

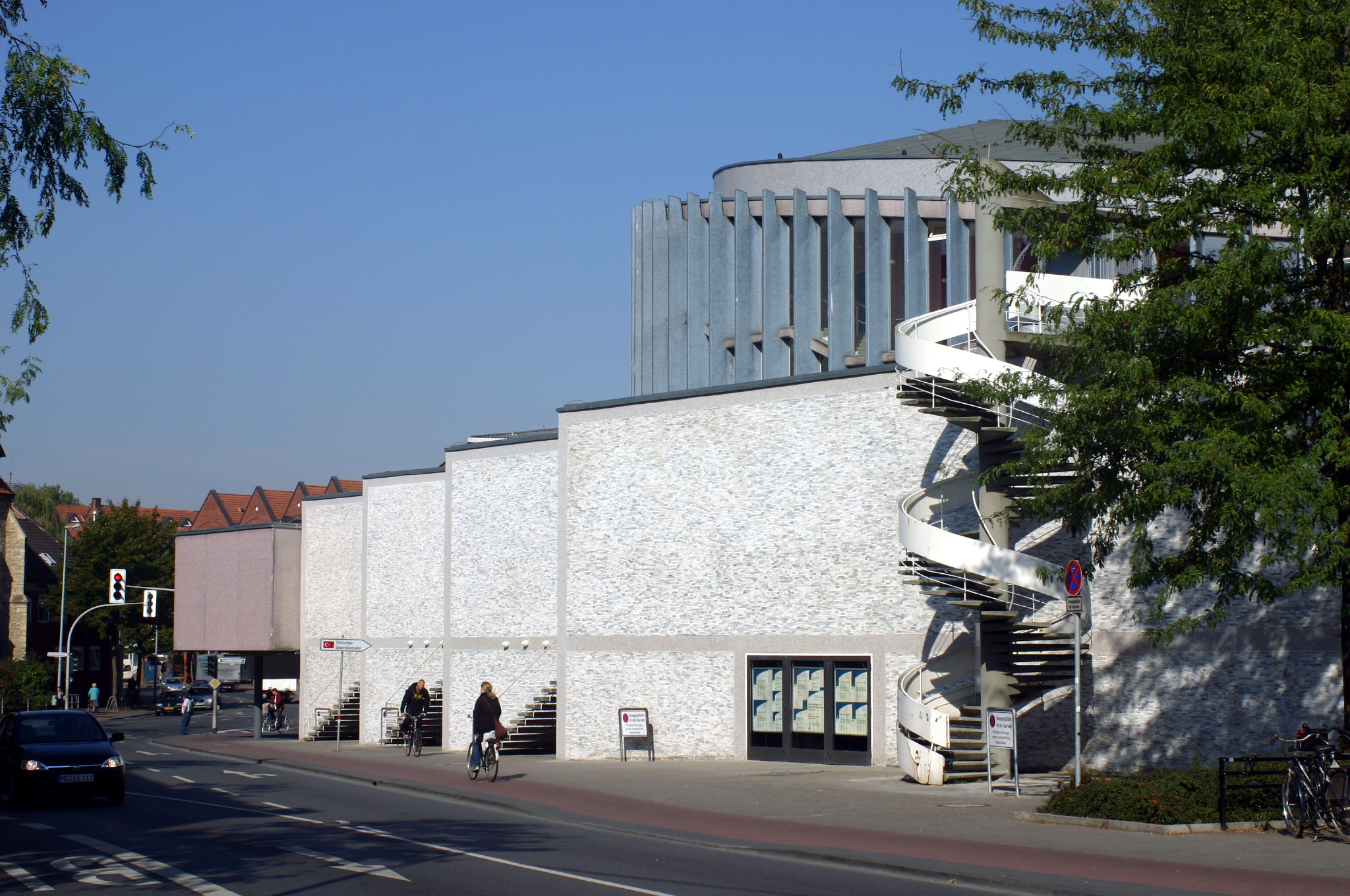
Side view from the Voßgasse

- Hermann Wedekind (1951–1954)
- Bruno von Niessen (1955–1957)
- Leon Epp (1957–1960)
- Alfred Erich Sistig (1960–1968)
- Horst Gnekow (1968–1973)
- Karl Wesseler (1983–1989)
- Thomas Bockelmann (1996–2004)
- Ulrich Peters (from 2012)

== General music directors ==
- Reinhard Peters (1961–1970)
- Will Humburg (1992–2004)
- Fabrizio Ventura (2007–2017)
- Golo Berg (from 2017)

== Literature ==
=== Cultural politics ===
- Volker Resing: Der Theaterneubau in Münster. Kulturpolitische Konflikte 1949–1956 (= Kleine Schriften aus dem Stadtarchiv Münster. Bd. 3). Regensberg, Münster 1999, ISBN 3-7923-0733-2.

=== Architecture ===
- Anton Henze: Die Stadttheater in Münster und Gelsenkirchen. In: Der Architekt. BDA, 1955, IV, pp 135–137.
- Das neue Stadttheater in Münster. In: Bauwelt. 1956, vol 47, pp 771–775.
- Stefan Rethfeld: Ein Manifest des Neubeginns – Stadttheater Münster (1952–1956) von Harald Deilmann, Max von Hausen, Ortwin Rave und Werner Ruhnau, in: Auf den zweiten Blick. Architektur der Nachkriegszeit in Nordrhein-Westfalen, ed. Sonja Hnilica, Markus Jager, Wolfgang Sonne, Bielefeld 2010, pp 133–139.
- Claudia Blümle, Jan Lazardzig: Öffentlichkeit in Ruinen. Zum Verhältnis von Theater, Architektur und Kunst in den 1950er Jahren, in: Ruinierte Öffentlichkeit. Zur Politik von Theater, Architektur und Kunst in den 1950er Jahren, ed. Claudia Blümle, Jan Lazardzig, Zürich 2012, pp 9–37.

=== Music ===
- Gernot Wojnarowicz (ed.): Musikalische Bekenntnisse. Dokumente und Reflexionen zu einer Konzert- und Opernreihe des Symphonieorchesters und der Städtischen Bühnen Münster. Im Auftrag des Symphonieorchesters der Stadt Münster-Generalmusikdirektor Will Humburg. Aschendorffsche Verlagsbuchhandlung, Münster 1995, ISBN 3-402-03942-7.
- Klaus Hortschansky, Berthold Warnecke (ed.): Der Ring des Nibelungen in Münster – der Zyklus von 1999 bis 2001. Agenda, Münster 2001, ISBN 3-89688-102-7.
- Uwe Schweikert, Berthold Warnecke (ed.): Musik und Szene Münster 1992–2004. Musiktheater – Szenische Konzerte – Symphoniekonzerte. Im Auftrag des Symphonieorchesters der Stadt Münster. Agenda, Münster 2004, ISBN 3-89688-223-6
- Antal Dorati: Notes of Seven Decades, Hodder & Stoughton, London, 1979.
- Richard Chlupaty: "Antal Dorati and the Joy of Making Music", The Antal Dorati Centenary Society, Bournemouth, 2006.
