= Union of German Academies of Sciences and Humanities =

- Established: 1893 (133 years ago)
- Country: Germany
- Coordinates: 52°30′50″N 13°23′39″E
- Membership: 8 (2024)
- Website: www.akademienunion.de/en/

The Union of German Academies of Sciences and Humanities (German: Union der deutschen Akademien der Wissenschaften or simply Akademienunion) is an umbrella organization for eight German academies of sciences and humanities. The Union brings together over 2,000 scientists from various disciplines, facilitating scientific exchange and collaboration among its member academies. It coordinates large-scale research projects and supports early-career researchers.

== Members ==
The member academies are:

- Berlin-Brandenburg Academy of Sciences and Humanities, located in Berlin and Potsdam
- Göttingen Academy of Sciences and Humanities
- Bavarian Academy of Sciences and Humanities, located in Munich
- Saxon Academy of Sciences and Humanities, located in Leipzig
- Heidelberg Academy of Sciences and Humanities
- Akademie der Wissenschaften und der Literatur, located in Mainz
- North Rhine-Westphalian Academy of Sciences, Humanities and the Arts, located in Düsseldorf
- Academy of Sciences and Humanities in Hamburg

The German National Academy of Sciences Leopoldina and the German Academy of Science and Engineering are not members of the Union.

== History ==
The organized collaboration between the German academies began in 1893 with the creation of the "Kartell" in Leipzig by delegates from the academies in Göttingen, Munich, Leipzig, and Vienna. In 1941, the Kartell was transformed by the Nazis into the "Reich Academy of German Science" and later into the "Reich Association of German Academies of Sciences."

In 1949, the academies in Göttingen, Munich, and Heidelberg founded the Working Group of German Academies of Sciences and Humanities, which was renamed the Conference of German Academies of Sciences and Humanities in 1967. On January 1, 1999, this Conference was renamed the Union of German Academies of Sciences and Humanities.

== Objectives and Activities ==
The Union coordinates and represents the collective interests of its member academies, particularly in areas such as international relations and collaborative research. The Union oversees the Academies Programme, which is one of the largest and most significant humanities and cultural research programs in Germany. With a budget of 75 million Euros, it supports 125 projects with 188 working groups across fields such as theology, philosophy, history, literary studies, linguistics, art history, archaeology, and epigraphy.

The Union also represents the academies abroad and sends delegates to national and international academic organizations. It is a member of several global networks, including All European Academies (ALLEA), the Amaldi Conference, the InterAcademy Partnership (IAP), the International Human Rights Network of Academies and Scholarly Societies (IHRN), and the Union Académique Internationale (UAI).

The Union engages in public relations, organizing events on current scientific topics, including the annual Academies Day, where member academies showcase their research to a wider audience.

== Collaborations ==
The Union works with the German Academy for Language and Literature to publish periodic reports on the state of the German language, contributing to public discussions about its development. Additionally, in cooperation with the Max Weber Foundation, the Union organizes the Humanities in Dialogue series, addressing contemporary issues in science, culture, and society.

Since 2007, the Union has also been a partner in the Stiftung Neue Verantwortung, a think tank dedicated to fostering connections among young academics.

== Governance and Organization ==
As of 2023, the Union's president is Christoph Markschies, with Reiner Anderl, Irene Dingel, and Daniel Göske serving as vice presidents.

The Union has been a registered association since 1991, with headquarters in Mainz and an office in Berlin.
