= Irene Dingel =

German historian and Protestant theologian

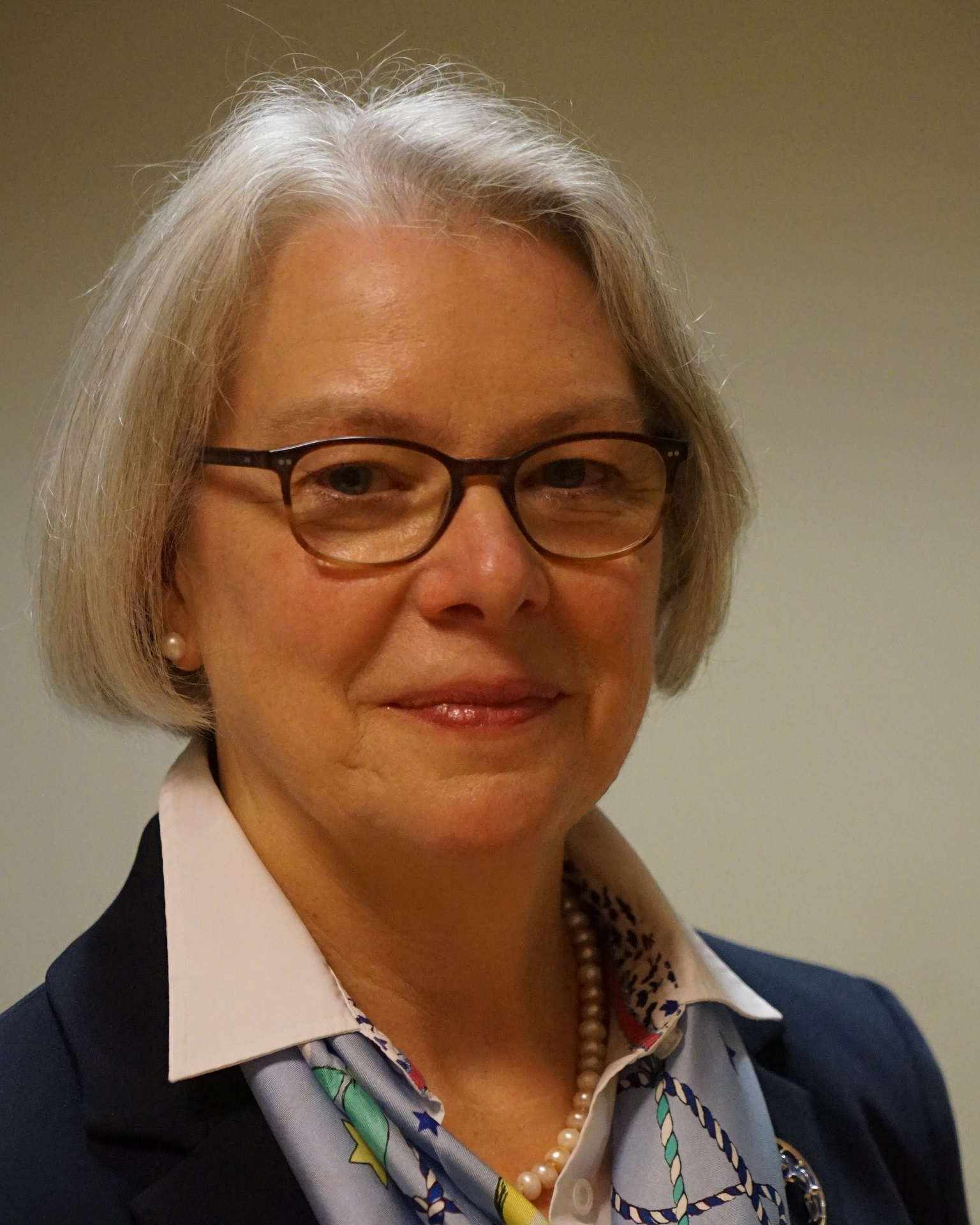
Irene Dingel, 2021

Irene Dingel (born April 26, 1956 in Werdohl, Germany) is a German historian and a Protestant theologian.

Irene Dingel studied Protestant theology and Romance studies in Heidelberg and Paris. From 1981 until 1982 she was an "Élève à titre étranger" at the École Normale Supérieure (ENS) de Fontenay-aux-Roses, and she also worked as an editor at the same time. Between 1982 and 1993 she was a scientific assistant at the theological faculty of Heidelberg University, where she also received several research grants. In 1986 she finished her doctorate in Heidelberg, which was followed by her habilitation in 1993. After that Dingel was a substitute professor and then a professor of historical theology at the Goethe University Frankfurt until 1998). Since 1998 she has held the chair of ecclesiastical history and the history of dogma at the faculty of Protestant history of the Johannes Gutenberg University Mainz. In addition, Dingel became the head of the Leibniz Institute of European History in Mainz in 2005, as director of the Department of Western Religious History.

Dingel is a member of different academic boards and associations, including:

- Member of the Academy of Sciences and Literature
- Board member of the Verein für Reformationsgeschichte
- Member of the Academic Advisory Commission "Evangelische Kirchenordnungen des 16. Jahrhunderts" of the Heidelberg Academy of Sciences and Humanities
- Member of the Inter-Academy Management Committee of the Leibniz-Edition
- Member of the Academic Advisory Council of the "Interdisziplinäres Institut für Kulturgeschichte der Frühen Neuzeit (IKFN)" at the University of Osnabrück
- Member of the University Council of the Johannes Gutenberg University Mainz

Since February 2012 Dingel is also a member of the German Council of Science and Humanities. On June 27, 2015 she was awarded the "Hermann-Sasse-Preis" of the Independent Evangelical-Lutheran Church.

Dingel's research interests are the history of the Reformation and of the Confessionalization. Besides that she's also engaged in the research of the early Enlightenment in Western Europe.

== Publications ==
Monographs (selection)

- Concordia controversa. Die öffentlichen Diskussionen um das lutherische Konkordienwerk am Ende des 16. Jahrhunderts, Gütersloh 1996 (Quellen und Forschungen zur Reformationsgeschichte 63), ISBN 978-3-579-01731-0.
- Beobachtungen zur Entwicklung des französischen Vokabulars: Petit Larousse 1968 – Petit Larousse 1981, Frankfurt/M. 1987 (Heidelberger Beiträge zur Romanistik 21), ISBN 978-3-8204-9577-5.
- Reformation. Zentren – Akteure – Ereignisse, Göttingen 2016, ISBN 978-3-7887-3032-1.
- Robert Kolb, Irene Dingel, L’ubomír Batka (Hg.), The Oxford Handbook of Martin Luther’s Theology, ISBN 978-0-198-76647-6, Oxford 2014.
- Irene Dingel und Christiane Tietz (Hg.), Säkularisierung und Religion. Europäische Wechselwirkungen, Göttingen 2019, ISBN 978-3-525-57093-7 (Veröffentlichungen des Instituts für Europäische Geschichte Mainz. Abt. für Abendländische Religionsgeschichte, Beiheft 123).

As editor (selection)

- with Christiane Tietz: Das Friedenspotenzial von Religion, Mainz 2009 (Veröffentlichungen des Instituts für Europäische Geschichte Mainz, Beiheft 78), ISBN 978-3-525-10091-2.
- with Matthias Schnettger: Auf dem Weg nach Europa. Deutungen, Visionen, Wirklichkeiten, Göttingen 2010 (Veröffentlichungen des Instituts für Europäische Geschichte Mainz, Beiheft 82), ISBN 978-3-525-10095-0.
- with Christiane Tietz: Die politische Aufgabe von Religion. Perspektiven der drei monotheistischen Religionen, Mainz 2011, ISBN 978-3-525-10113-1.
- Die Bekenntnisschriften der Evangelisch-Lutherischen Kirche. Vollständige Neuedition, Göttingen 2014, ISBN 978-3-525-52104-5.
- Die Bekenntnisschriften der Evangelisch-Lutherischen Kirche. Quellen und Materialien., Bd. I-II, Göttingen 2014, ISBN 978-3-525-52105-2 und ISBN 978-3-525-52102-1.
- Abraham Mangon, Kurze doch wahrhafftige Beschreibung der Geschichte der Reformierten in Frankfurt. 1554–1712, Leipzig 2004, ISBN 978-3-374-02177-2.
- with Henning P. Jürgens: Meilensteine der Reformation. Schlüsseldokumente der frühen Wirksamkeit Martin Luthers, Gütersloh 2014, ISBN 978-3-579-08170-0.
- with Armin Kohnle: Gute Ordnung. Ordnungsmodelle und Ordnungsvorstellungen in der Reformationszeit, Leipzig 2014, ISBN 978-3-374-03790-2.
- with Robert Kolb and L’ubomír Batka: The Oxford Handbook of Martin Luther’s Theology, Oxford 2014, ISBN 978-0-19-960470-8.
- with Volker Leppin: Das Reformatorenlexikon, Darmstadt 2014, ISBN 978-3-650-40009-3.
- with Heinz Duchhardt: Die europäische Integration und die Kirchen II: Denker und Querdenker, Göttingen 2012, ISBN 978-3-525-10115-5.
- with Matthias Schnettger: Auf dem Weg nach Europa. Deutungen, Visionen, Wirklichkeiten, Göttingen 2010, ISBN 978-3-525-10095-0.
- with Heinrich Assel: Verkündigung und Forschung, theological journal.
- with Joachim Bahlcke: Die Reformierten in Schlesien. Vom 16. Jahrhundert bis zur Altpreußischen Union von 1817, Göttingen 2016 (VIEG Beih. 106), ISBN 978-3-525-10140-7.
- Memoria – theologische Synthese – Autoritätenkonflikt. Die Rezeption Luthers und Melanchthons in der Schülergeneration, Tübingen 2016 (Spätmittelalter, Humanismus, Reformation 90), ISBN 978-3-16-154238-1.
- with Henning P. Jürgens: Auf den Spuren der Reformation in Rheinland-Pfalz, Petersberg 2017, ISBN 978-3-7319-0438-0.
- Schriftenreihe Controversia et Confessio. Theologische Kontroversen 1548–1577/80, Göttingen.
- with Johannes Paulmann: European History Online
