= Mainzed =

Mainz Centre for Digitality in the Humanities and Cultural Studies
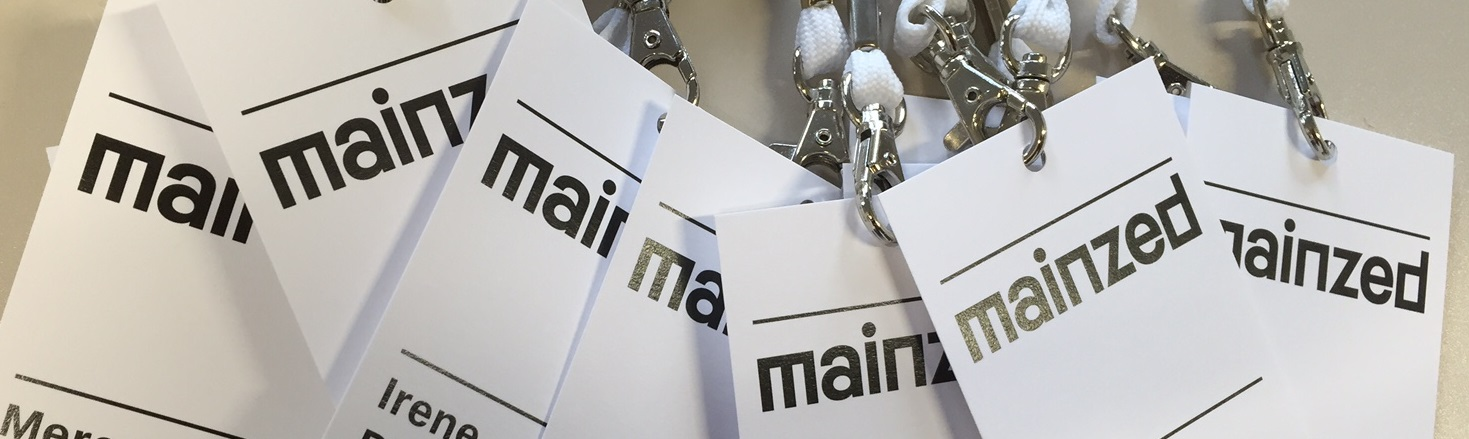
- Formation: 6 November 2015
- Location: Mainz, Rhineland-Palatinate, Germany
- Fields: Digital humanities
- Leader: Kai-Christian Bruhn, Klaus Pietschmann
- Website: mainzed.org/index_en.html

Mainzed (German pronunciation: [ˈmaɪntsɛt]; stylized in all lowercase; acronym for Mainzer Zentrum für Digitalität in den Geistes- und Kulturwissenschaften, i.e. Mainz Centre for Digitality in the Humanities and Cultural Studies) is a joint initiative of six scientific institutions to promote digital methodology in the humanities and cultural sciences in Mainz, Germany. It was founded in the context of the academic annual celebration of the Academy of Sciences and Literature Mainz on 6 November 2015. Partners of Mainzed are the Academy of Sciences and Literature Mainz (ADW), the Mainz University of Applied Sciences (HS Mainz), the Institute for Historical Regional Studies at the University of Mainz (IGL), the Johannes Gutenberg University Mainz (JGU), the Leibniz Institute of European History Mainz (IEG) and the Romano-Germanic Central Museum Mainz – Archaeological research institute (RGZM).

== History ==
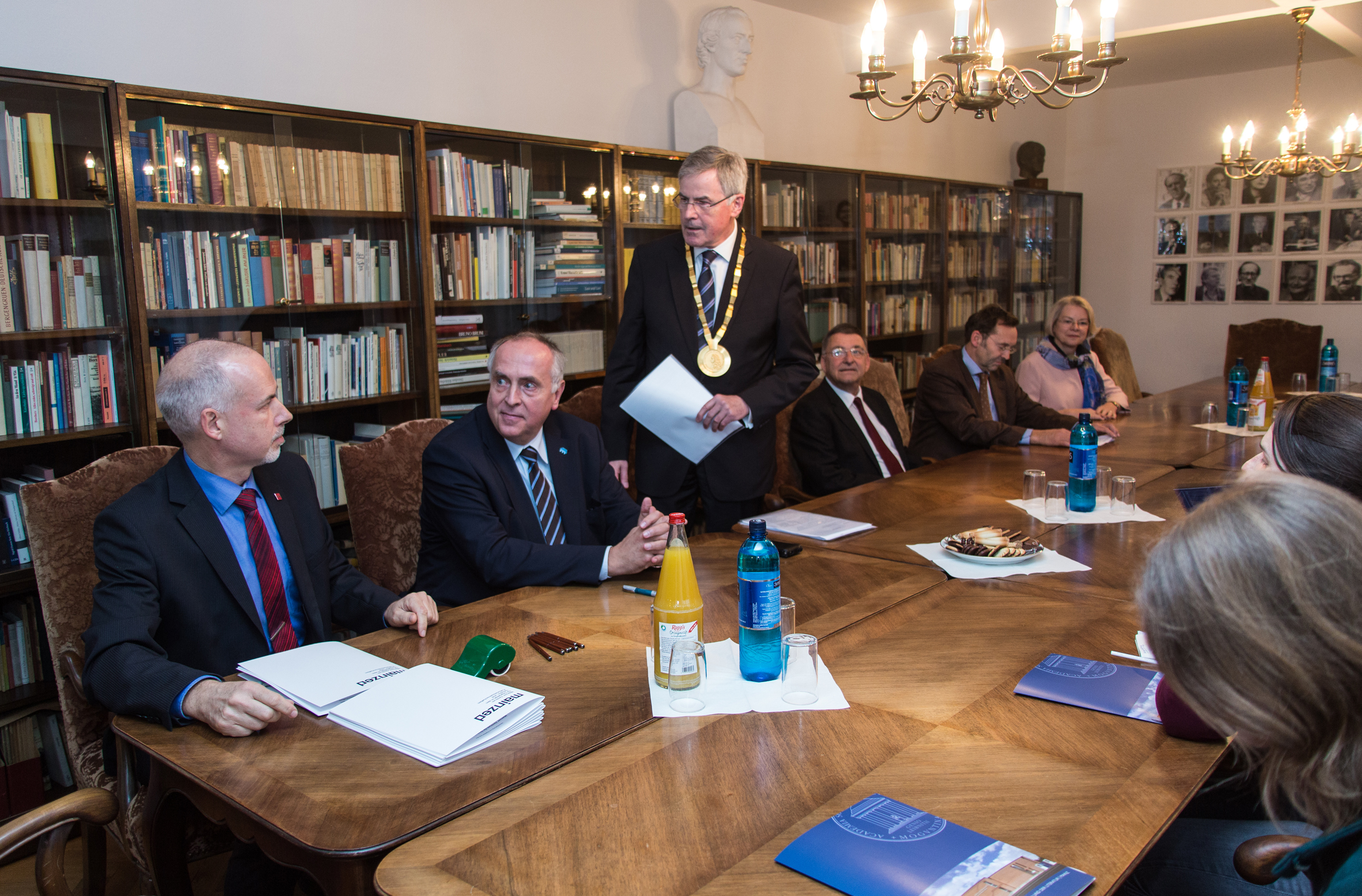
Photo of the ceremonial signing of the agreement on the foundation of Mainzed at the Academy of Sciences and Literature Mainz on 6 November 2015 showing from left to right: Prof. Dr. Georg Krausch (JGU), Prof. Dr.Eng. Gerhard Muth (HS Mainz), Prof. Dr. Gernot Wilhelm (ADW), Prof. Dr. Michael Matheus (IGL), Prof. Dr. Falko Daim (RGZM), Prof. Dr. Irene Dingel (IEG). Photographer: Prof. Dr. Ernst-Dieter Hehl.

Mainzed is based on several long-term cooperations between larger institutions in Mainz including the six partners from the founding phase. The collaborations already began in 1997 between the Institute for Spatial Information and Surveying Technology (i3mainz) and the RGZM by operating the Competence Centre for Spatial Information Technology in the Humanities. This center is hosted at the HS Mainz together with the i3mainz. The Digitale Akademie was founded in 2009 as research and development institution for digital humanities of the ADW. It is connected to the Institute of Historical Regional Studies at the University of Mainz, the Leibniz Institute of European History and the universities of Mainz. In autumn 2013, the informal Network DHMainz was created with the help of the Mainz Research Alliance. The network prepared the Digital Humanities Day 2014 in Mainz where first drafts for the continuation of the initiative were made, which lead to the founding of Mainzed in 2015.

== Tasks ==
Mainzed was founded in order to accompany and practically implement the transformation of the humanities and cultural studies in the course of digitisation in Mainz. Mainzed works in research, the support of research, qualification and transfer. Furthermore, it constitutes a social research infrastructure by offering a network of scientific exchange with regard to the development of projects and research foci for scientists of all qualification levels.

Range of competences represented in the network:

- 3D data
- Art history
- Computer science
- Content management
- Digital archaeology
- Digital Scholarly Editions
- Digital history
- Geographic information system
- Grammatical Variation
- Historical geographic information system
- Musicology, music informatics
- Natural-language processing
- Prosopographical network
- Open data, linked data
- Religious studies
- Semantic modeling, Semantic Web
- TUSTEP / TUSCRIPT
- Web development

Mainzed developed the inter-university master's degree program Digital Methods in the Humanities and Cultural Studies in terms of organization and concept. Since 2016, each winter term 24 students have been able to begin the course of studies comprising four semesters provided that they have a bachelor's degree in the humanities, cultural studies or with a focus in computer science. The head of this degree program and director of Mainzed Kai-Christian Bruhn received the academy price of the federal state Rhineland-Palatinate on 5 December 2017 in recognition of his interdisciplinary work in teaching and research.

Mainzed is initiator of many events promoting the dialogue with the public. An example of this is the fishbowl discussion about the topic digitalität und diversität – die Geisteswissenschaften im Jahr 2026 that took place in 2016. Mainzed has organised similar annual events with national and international guest lecturers like Mercedes Bunz and Joscha Bach.

== Organizational structure ==
Mainzed is organized into an executive board composed of the founding director Kai-Christian Bruhn as well as his deputy Klaus Pietschmann, a scientific advisory board with representatives of the partner institutions and an executive office.
