= Paulmann =

Paulmann is a surname. Notable people with the surname include:

- Horst Paulmann (1935–2025), German-Chilean billionaire entrepreneur
- Johannes Paulmann (born 1960), German historian
