= Kai-Christian Bruhn =

German computational archaeologist (b. 1970)

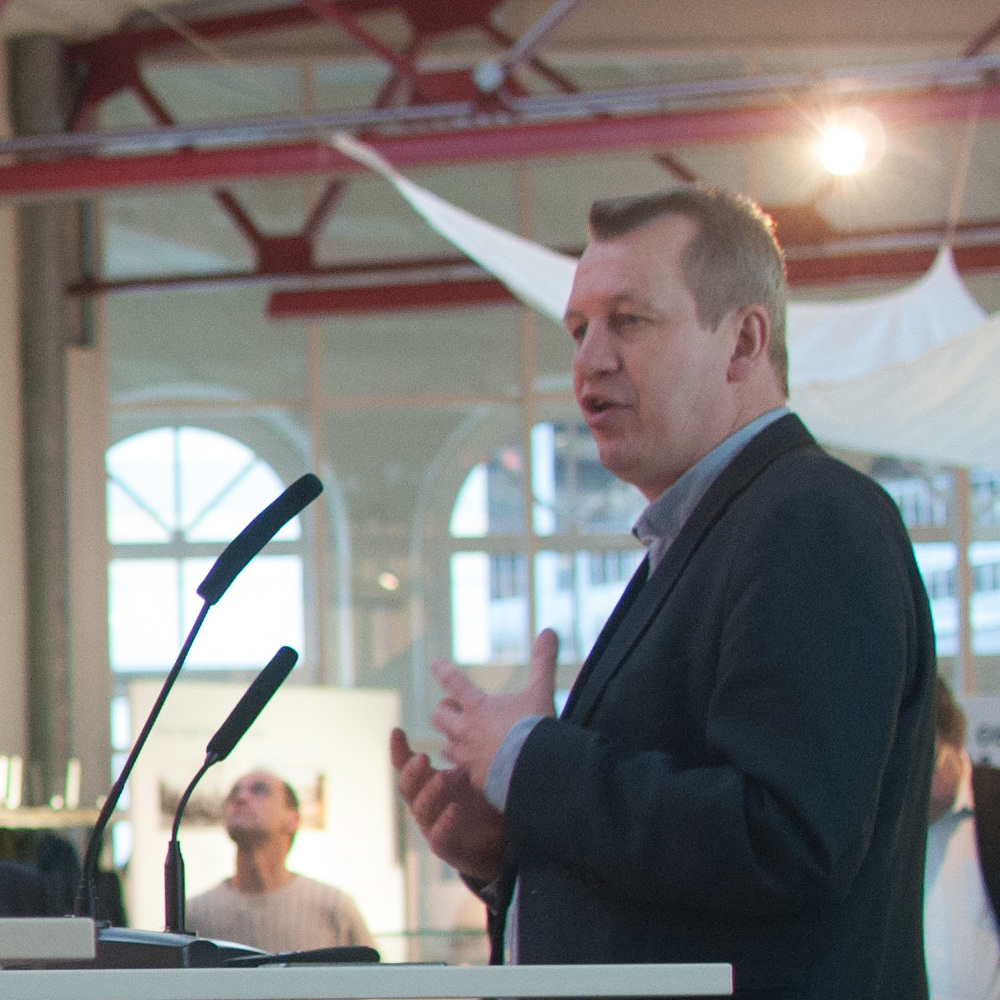
Kai-Christian Bruhn in 2016

Kai-Christian Bruhn (born 24 January 1970) is a German computational archaeologist from the Mainz University of Applied Sciences, with expertise in geoinformatics.

He was involved in the discovery of a colossal Ramses II statue in Egypt.

As director of mainzed, Kai-Christian Bruhn received the academy prize of the Rhineland-Palatinate state in December 2017 in recognition of his interdisciplinary work in teaching and research.
