= Laurenz Lütteken =

German musicologist

Laurenz Lütteken (born 9 September 1964 in Essen) is a German musicologist. Since 2001, he has been Ordinarius for musicology at the University of Zürich. Since 2013, he is General editor of MGG Online.

== Writings ==
As Author

- Guillaume Dufay und die isorhythmic motet. Hamburg 1993.
- (with Christoph Wagner): Die Apotheose des Chorals Homo absconditus. Stuttgart 1997.
- Das Monologische als Denkform in der Musik zwischen 1760 und 1785. Tübingen 1998.
- Contribution to Ludwig Finscher: Bowed string instrument. Stuttgart 2001.
- Mozart. Leben und Musik im Zeitalter der Aufklärung. Beck, Munich 2017, ISBN 978-3-406-71171-8.

As publisher

- (with Axel Beer): Festschrift Klaus Hortschansky zum 60. Geburtstag. Tutzing 1995.
- Mass and Motets. Kassel 2002.
- (with Gerhard Splitt): Metastasio im Deutschland der Aufklärung. Tübingen 2002.
- (with Anselm Gerhard): Zwischen Klassik und Klassizismus. Kassel 2003.
- Die Musik in den Zeitschriften des 18. Jahrhunderts. (with CD-ROM), Kassel 2004.
- (with Nicole Schwindt): Autorität und Autoritäten in musikalischer Theorie, Komposition und Aufführung. Kassel 2004.
- (with Hans-Joachim Hinrichsen): Meisterwerke neu gehört. Ein kleiner Kanon der Musik. 14 Werkporträts. Kassel 2004.
- (with Hans-Joachim Hinrichsen): Zwischen Bekenntnis und Verweigerung. Kassel 2005.
- (with Hans-Joachim Hinrichsen): Bruckner – Brahms. Kassel 2006.
- (with Hans-Joachim Hinrichsen) Passagen. Kassel 2007.
- Musikwissenschaft. Eine Positionsbestimmung. Kassel 2007.
- Kunstwerk der Zukunft. Neue Zürcher Zeitung Libro, Zürich 2008.
- (with Hans-Joachim Hinrichsen): Mozarts Lebenswelten. Kassel 2008.
- (with Birgit Lodes): Institutionalisierung als Prozess. Laaber, 2009.
- Musik und Mythos – Mythos Musik um 1900. Kassel 2009.
- (with Urs Fischer): ’Mehr Respekt vor dem tüchtigen Mann’ – Carl Czerny (1791–1857). Kassel 2009.
- Gemeinschaftsausgabe: Wagner-Handbuch. Bärenreiter Verlag, Kassel 2012, ISBN 978-3-7618-2055-1 and J. B. Metzler Verlag, Stuttgart 2012, ISBN 978-3-476-02428-2.
- Zwischen Tempel und Verein. Musik und Bürgertum im 19. Jahrhundert. Zürcher Festspiel-Symposium 2012. Bärenreiter, Kassel 2013, ISBN 978-3-7618-2154-1. (Recension)

Editing work

Historical-critical complete edition of the musical works of Arcangelo Corelli

- Werke ohne Opuszahl: vol 5. With Hans J. Marx, Hans Oesch (editor), Laaber, 1976.
- Concerti grossi, opus VI: vol. 4. Rudolf Bossard, Hans-Joachim Hinrichsen, Hans Oesch (editor) Laaber, 1978
- Sonate da Camera, Opus II and IV: vol 2. Hans-Joachim Hinrichsen, Hans Oesch, Jürg Stenzl (editor), Laaber, 1986.
- Sonate da chiesa, Opus I und III with Francesco Geminianis Concerto grosso-Bearbeitungen von sechs Sonaten aus Opus I und III: vol. 1. Hans-Joachim Hinrichsen, Max Lütolf, Hans Oesch (editor) Laaber, 1987.
- Sonate a Violino e Violone o Cimbalo, op. V: vol. 3. Hans-Joachim Hinrichsen, Hans Oesch, Cristina Urchueguía (editor), Martin Zimmermann (preface). Laaber, 2007.
