= The Role of Culture in Early Expansions of Humans =

The Role of Culture in Early Expansions of Humans (ROCEEH) is an interdisciplinary project of the Heidelberg Academy of Sciences and Humanities. Within the framework of this research center, social and natural scientists study the effect that culture has on the successive expansions of humans out of Africa and across the Old World. The Research Center is located at the University of Tübingen while the Senckenberg Research Institute is in Frankfurt am Main, Germany.

== Research ==
=== Methods ===
The project pays special attention to the development of human capabilities that deal with problem-solving through culture. The project uses a database called ROCEEH Out-of-Africa Database (ROAD) with geographic information system functions to conduct its research. Geographic data about a locality is added to information about the geological layers, the divisions of archaeological layers, and cultural remains. To complete the picture, information about important human and animal fossils, vegetation, and climate is gathered to reconstruct early habitats. Using a geographic information system, the results are compiled into a digital atlas to show the important developments in human-environment interactions.
