= Pietschmann =

Pietschmann is a surname. Notable people with the surname include:

- Andreas Pietschmann (born 1969), German actor
- Antonia Pietschmann (born 2006), German luger
- Klaus Pietschmann (born 1972), German musicologist
- Max Pietschmann (1865–1962), German painter
- Viktor Pietschmann (1881–1956), Austrian ichthyologist
