= Konstanze Musketa =

German woman musicologist

Konstanze Musketa (born 14 September 1956) is a German musicologist and head of the Library of the Handel House Foundation.

== Life ==
Born in Halle an der Saale, after the Abitur Musketa studied musicology at the Martin-Luther-Universität Halle-Wittenberg in 1975. She wrote her diploma thesis in 1980 about Die Musikhandschriften Johann Friedrich Faschs im Fachbereich Musikwissenschaft der Martin-Luther-Universität Halle. In 1988 the Promotion A to Dr. phil. followed with a thesis on Die Duetti und Terzetti da camera von Georg Friedrich Händel.

In 1980 she became a staff member of the Handel House in the library and documentation department. There she is currently head of the Library, Archive and Research Department as well as the study course. She conceived exhibitions for the Handel House and was responsible for the corresponding museum guides. (1998, 2009 and 2012). She also compiled the catalogue Letters from the partial estate of Friedrich Chrysander (2001).

Her main research interests are Georg Friedrich Händel, Carl Friedrich Christian Fasch and Johann Friedrich Fasch as well as the history of music in Halle. Several musicological publications were produced for the "Internationale Fasch-Gesellschaft", whose president she was from 1995 to 2008. Since 1999 she has been a member of the Georg-Friedrich-Händel-Gesellschaft. She is editor of Handel's chamber duets and terzettes in the Hallische Händel-Ausgabe.

== Publications ==
- Der Stadtsingechor als ein "Annexum" der Franckeschen Stiftungen zu Halle. Ein Beitrag zur Geschichte des Chores in der Zeit von 1808 bis 1946, dargestellt an Dokumenten aus dem Archiv der Franckeschen Stiftungen (Schriften des Händelhauses in Halle. Vol. 7). Handel House, Halle an der Saale 1991, ISBN 3-910019-04-8.
- with Klaus Hortschansky (ed.): Georg Friedrich Händel – ein Lebensinhalt. Gedenkschrift für Bernd Baselt (1934–1993). Bärenreiter-Verlag, Kassel 1995, ISBN 3-7618-1261-2.
- (ed.): Was dieser Geldmangel uns vor täglich Kummer machet. Briefe, Johann Friedrich Fasch betreffend, aus dem St. Bartholomäi-Stift zu Zerbst (1752 until 1757) (Schriftenreihe zur Mitteldeutschen Musikgeschichte. Series I: Quellenschriften. Vol. 3). Ziethen, Oschersleben 1997, ISBN 978-3-932090-13-4.
- Musikgeschichte der Stadt Halle. Führer durch die Ausstellung des Händel-Hauses. Handel House, Halle an der Saale 1998, ISBN 978-3-910019-13-3.
- with Christiane Barth: Händel, der Europäer. Führer durch die Ausstellung im Händel-Haus. Handel House, Halle (Saale) 2009, ISBN 978-3-910019-25-6.
- with Christiane Barth: Musikstadt Halle. Führer durch die Ausstellung im Wilhelm-Friedemann-Bach-Haus Halle. Handel House Foundation, Halle 2012, ISBN 978-3-943095-01-2.
