= Göttingen Academy of Sciences and Humanities =

Academy of science in Germany

Coordinates: 51°32′05″N 9°56′14″E

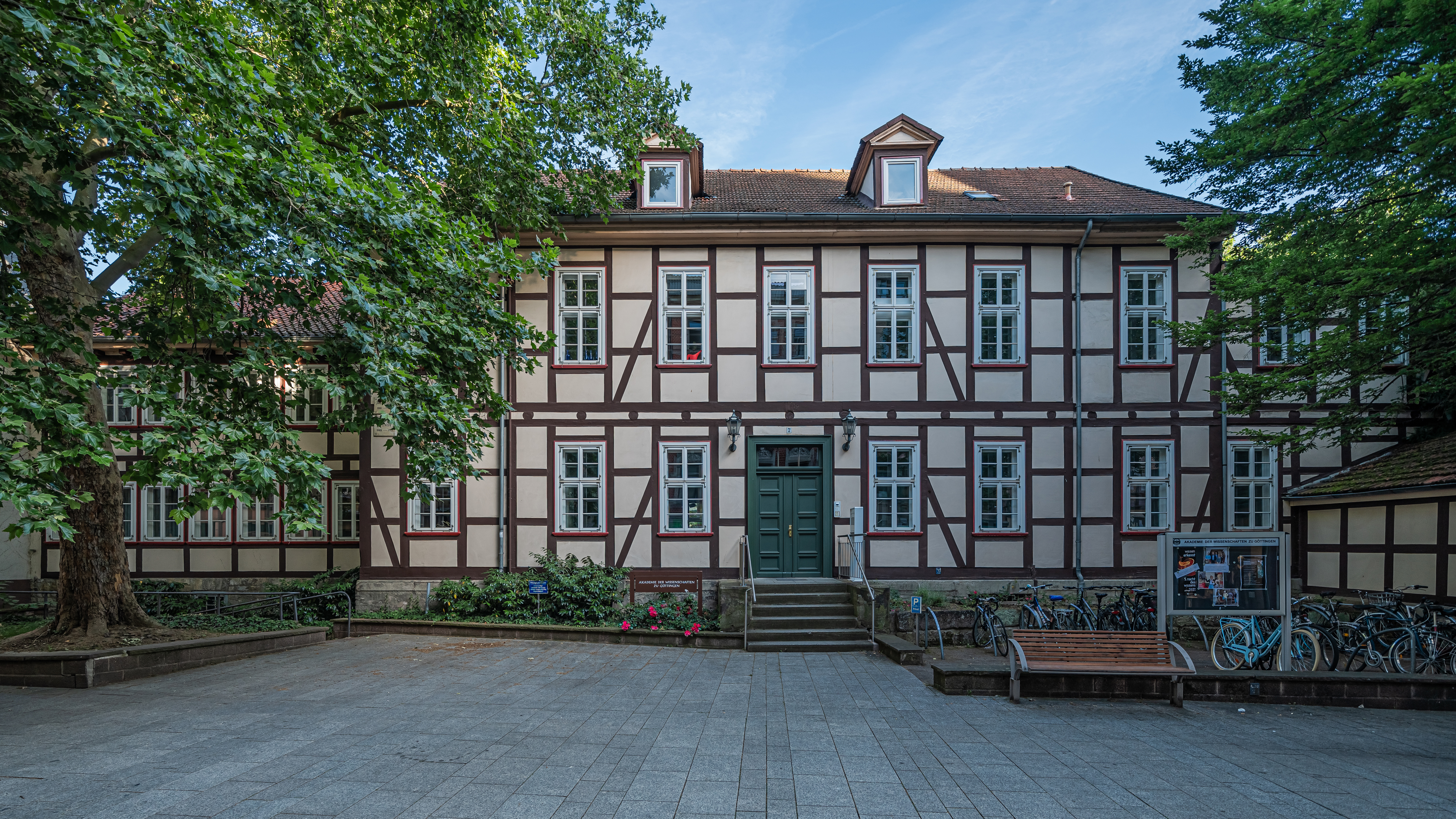
The building of the Academy on the Theaterstraße (Theatre street) in Göttingen

The Göttingen Academy of Sciences (name since 2023 : German: Niedersächsische Akademie der Wissenschaften zu Göttingen) is the oldest continuously existing institution among the eight scientific academies in Germany, which are united under the umbrella of the Union of German Academies of Sciences and Humanities. It has the task of promoting research under its own auspices and in collaboration with academics in and outside Germany. It has its seat in the university town of Göttingen. Its meeting room is located in the auditorium of the University of Göttingen.

== History ==
The Königliche Gesellschaft der Wissenschaften (Royal Society of Sciences) was founded in 1751 by King George II of Great Britain, who was also Prince-Elector of the Holy Roman Empire and Duke of Brunswick-Lüneburg (House of Hanover), the German state in which Göttingen was located. The first president was the Swiss natural historian and poet Albrecht von Haller. It was renamed the "Akademie der Wissenschaften zu Göttingen" in 1939. Among the learned societies in the Federal Republic of Germany, the Göttingen academy is the second-oldest after the Halle-based Leopoldina (1652).

== Organisation ==
The Academy is a Körperschaft des öffentlichen Rechts and has the task to serve academic research in its own work and in collaboration with researchers and institutions inside and outside Germany. Its members are divided into two classes, the Mathematical-Physical class and the Philological-Historical class. There are a maximum number of forty local members (i.e., members from Northern Germany) in each class and a maximum of one hundred corresponding members, elected from the rest of Germany and outside the country.

The review and literature journal Göttingische Gelehrte Anzeigen has been published by the Academy since 1753 and is the oldest academic journal still published in the German-language area. The Academy belongs to the Union of the German Academies of Sciences and Humanities.

== Prizes ==
The Academy awards the following prizes:

- Lichtenberg Medal (Lichtenberg-Medaille), the highest award of the Academy
- Dannie Heineman Prize (Dannie-Heineman-Preis)
- Grimm Brothers Medal (Brüder-Grimm-Medaille)
- Gauss Visiting Professorship (Gauß-Professur der Akademie der Wissenschaften zu Göttingen)
- Academy Prize of the Mathematical-Physical class (Nachwuchspreis der Mathematisch-Naturwissenschaftlichen Klasse), since 2019 replacing the individual Academy Prizes for Biology, Chemistry and Physics
- Academy Prize for the Humanities (Preis für Geisteswissenschaften)
- Hans Janssen Prize (Hans-Janssen-Preis), the Academy Prize for Art History
- Hanns Lilje Prize (Hanns-Lilje-Preis), the Academy Prize for Theology
- Wedekind Prize (Wedekind-Preis), the Academy Prize for History
- Wilhelm Jost Memorial Medal (Wilhelm-Jost-Gedächtnismedaille), the Academy Prize for Physicochemistry

== Notable members ==
- Heinrich Friedrich von Diez
- Carl Friedrich Gauß
- Johann Wolfgang von Goethe
- Jacob Grimm
- Wilhelm Grimm
- Stefan Hell
- Werner Heisenberg
- Alexander von Humboldt
- Wilhelm von Humboldt
- Georg Christoph Lichtenberg
- Erwin Neher
- Bert Sakmann
- Paul Gerhard Schmidt

Current members include three Nobel Prize winners, throughout the history of the Academy, 74 of their members were awarded a Nobel Prize.

== Literature ==
- Karl Arndt: Göttinger Gelehrte. Die Akademie der Wissenschaften zu Göttingen in Bildnissen und Würdigungen 1751–2000. 2 Bände. Wallstein, Göttingen 2001, ISBN 3-89244-485-4.
- Holger Krahnke: Die Mitglieder der Akademie der Wissenschaften zu Göttingen 1751–2001. Vandenhoeck & Ruprecht, Göttingen 2001, ISBN 3-525-82516-1 (Abhandlungen der Akademie der Wissenschaften zu Göttingen, Philologisch-Historische Klasse, 3. Folge, Bd. 246/Mathematisch-Physikalische Klasse, 3. Folge, Bd. 50).
- Achim Link: Die Veröffentlichungen der Akademie der Wissenschaften zu Göttingen 1751–2001. Bibliographie mit Schlagwort-Katalog. Vandenhoeck & Ruprecht, Göttingen 2001, ISBN 3-525-82518-8 (Abhandlungen der Akademie der Wissenschaften zu Göttingen, Philologisch-Historische Klasse, 3. Folge, Bd. 245/Mathematisch-Physikalische Klasse, 3. Folge, Bd. 49).
- Rudolf Smend, Hans-Heinrich Voigt (Hrsg.): Die Wissenschaften in der Akademie. Vorträge beim Jubiläumskolloquium der Akademie der Wissenschaften zu Göttingen im Juni 2000. Vandenhoeck & Ruprecht, Göttingen 2002, ISBN 3-525-82519-6 (Abhandlungen der Akademie der Wissenschaften zu Göttingen, Philologisch-Historische Klasse, 3. Folge, Bd. 247/Mathematisch-Physikalische Klasse, 3. Folge, Bd. 51).
- Rudolf Smend (Hrsg.): Wissenschaft entsteht im Gespräch. 250 Jahre Akademie der Wissenschaften zu Göttingen. Wallstein, Göttingen 2002, ISBN 3-89244-624-5.
