= Golo Berg =

German conductor

Golo Berg (born 1968) is a German conductor, the music director of the Theater Münster.

== Life and career ==
Born in Weimar in 1968, Berg studied with Gunter Kahlert at the Hochschule für Musik Franz Liszt Weimar from 1985 to 1991. He took master classes of Lorin Maazel, Luciano Berio, Michael Gielen, Lothar Zagrosek, Rudolf Barshai, Dmitri Kitajenko and Frans Brüggen. In 1990 he was a finalist of the Arturo Toscanini Competition in Parma. He became chief conductor of the Landestheater Mecklenburg at age 21, as one of the youngest chief conductors in the world. He was chief conductor of the Hofer Symphoniker and Generalmusikdirektor (GMD) at the Theater Hof from 1998 to 2001, He was then GMD at the Anhaltisches Theater until 2009, and GMD at the Theater Vorpommern from 2012 to 2017. In 2017 he became GMD at the Theater Münster with the 2017/18 season.

Berg conducted several GErman orchestras including the Symphonieorchester des Bayerischen Rundfunks, the Rundfunk-Sinfonieorchester Berlin, the MDR-Sinfonieorchester Leipzig, the NDR Radiophilharmonie Hannover and die Hamburger Symphoniker. He conducted abroad in the UK, Italy, Poland, Portugal and Switzerland, in China with the Shanghai Symphony Orchestra and in Japan with the Tokyo Metropolitan Symphony Orchestra and the Tokyo Symphony Orchestra.

As a conductor of opera, Berg worked as a guest at the Leipzig Opera, Cologne Opera, Nationaltheater Mannheim and the Theater St. Gallen. He collaborated in almost 100 productions with 30 stage directors, including Sebastian Baumgarten, Jonathan Eaton, Johannes Felsenstein, Nicholas Muni, Anthony Pilavachi and Michael Sturm. He made several radio recordings with the Anhaltischen Philharmonie and recorded with cpo several CDs. He recorded a DVD of Wagner's Tristan und Isolde directed by Felsenstein in 2008. He has held regular master classes for young conductors for Deutscher Musikrat, working also as a member of their juries.
