= Klaus Pietschmann =

German musicologist

Klaus Pietschmann (born in 1972) is a German musicologist. Since 2009 he has been teaching at the University of Mainz.

== Career ==
Born in Cologne, Pietschmann studied musicology and Medieval studies at the University of Cologne, at the University of Florence and at the University of Münster. In 1997/98 he was at the German Historical Institute in Rome and received his habilitation in 2000 with a thesis on Church music between tradition and reform. The Papal Chapel and its repertoire under Pope Paul III. Subsequently, he worked until 2003 in the Rheinische Friedrich-Wilhelms-Universität Bonn and Cologne in a research project on DFG-Opernprojekt. From 2003 to 2006 he was assistant to Hans-Joachim Hinrichsen and Laurenz Lütteken at the University of Zurich, where he also received his habilitation. From 2006 to 2009 he held assistant and guest professorships at the University of Bern and the University of Graz. In 2009 he was appointed to the Institute for Musicology at the University of Mainz.

Pietschmann is deputy director of mainzed, the Mainz Center for Digitality in the Humanities and Cultural Studies.

In 2008, he received the Preis für Geisteswissenschaften der Akademie der Wissenschaften zu Göttingen.

== Publications ==
- Pietschmann, Klaus (2021). "Ein Graffito von Josquin Desprez auf der Cantoria der Sixtinischen Kapelle". Die Musikforschung (in German). 52 (2): 204–207. doi:10.52412/mf.1999.H2.887. JSTOR 41123290. S2CID 140790222.
- Kirchenmusik zwischen Tra dition und Reform. Die Prefecture of the Papal Household und ihr Repertoire im Pontifikat Pope Paul III (1534–1549) (CASCAM, volume 11). Vatican City 2007
- Laboratorium des Wandels. Wien und die Diversifizierung der Oper um 1800. Habilitationsschrift Zürich 2006 (Druck i. V.)
- Das Erzbistum Köln in der Musikgeschichte des 15. und 16. Jahrhunderts. Contributions to Rhineland music history. volume 172. Merseburger, Kassel 2008.
- Edited with Hans-Joachim Hinrichsen: Jenseits der Bühne: Bearbeitungs- und Rezeptionsformen der Oper im 19. und 20. Jahrhundert. Symposiumsbericht der International Musicological Society 2007 (Schweizer Beiträge zur Musikforschung, volume 15). Bärenreiter, Kassel 2010.
- Edited with Melanie Wald-Fuhrmann: Der Kanon der Musik. Theorie und Geschichte. Ein Handbuch. Edition text + Kritik, Munich 2011, ISBN 978-3-86916-106-8.
