= Paul Gerhard Schmidt =

Paul Gerhard Schmidt (25 March 1937 – 25 September 2010) was a German medievalist and professor emeritus of medieval Latin philology.

== Biography ==
Schmidt was born on 25 March 1937 in Pieske near Frankfurt (Oder). He took his abitur in 1956 at the Evangelischen Gymnasium in Berlin-Grunewald, and studied classical and medieval Latin philology in Berlin and Göttingen. He received his Ph.D. in July 1962 from the University of Göttingen, with the dissertation Supplemente lateinischer Prosa in der Neuzeit: Ein Überblick über Rekonstruktionsversuche zu lateinischen Autoren von der Renaissance bis zur Aufklärung, and then went to Rome where after a two-year study of Auxiliary sciences of history he received the diploma Palaeographus et Archivarius Vaticanus. His 1970 habilitation in Göttingen was based on a critical edition of the Architrenius by Johannes de Hauvilla, which was published in 1974. Schmidt became professor at the University of Marburg in 1978. In 1989 he moved to the University of Freiburg, where he was a professor of medieval Latin philology. He died on 25 September 2010 of a heart attack, and is buried on the Bergäckerfriedhof.

Schmidt was an extraordinary member of the Società Internazionale per lo Studio del Medioevo Latino, corresponding member of the Göttingen Academy of Sciences and the academic society of the Goethe University Frankfurt, and member of the Istituto Lombardo. He had visiting professorships in Oxford, Florence, Fribourg (Wolfgang-Stammler-Gastprofessur 1993–94), Siena, Tartu, and Paris.

Schmidt occupied much of his time with palaeography and codicology. He was editor or co-editor of the series Datierte Handschriften in Bibliotheken der Bundesrepublik Deutschland, Mittellateinische Studien und Texte, and the journal Itineraria: Letteratura di viaggio e conoscenza del mondo dall’Antichità al Rinascimento. Until the end of 1999 he was president of the department of manuscript catalogs of the Deutsche Forschungsgemeinschaft. He was also a member of the council of the Onderzoekschool Mediëvistiek (Leiden/Groningen/Utrecht) and the Institute for European Cultural History (Augsburg).

Schmidt directed 16 dissertations (including that by Johannes Schilling and 3 habilitations (Udo Kühne, Thomas Haye and Elisabeth Stein).

== Bibliography ==
- Andreas Bihrer and Elisabeth Stein (eds.): Nova de Veteribus. Mittel- und neulateinische Studien für Paul Gerhard Schmidt, München and Leipzig: Saur 2004. ISBN 3-598-73015-2
