= Walter Benjamin Kolleg =

- Type: Public (cantonal)
- Established: 2015
- President: Stefan Rebenich
- Location: Bern, Switzerland
- Website: www.wbkolleg.unibe.ch/index_eng.html

The Walter Benjamin Kolleg (WBKolleg) of the University of Bern was created in 2015. It is a dedicated to inter- and transdisciplinary research activities in the social sciences and humanities. It provides financial support and a hub for early career scholars. Moreover, it supports cooperation between faculties and universities.

The Kolleg is named after Walter Benjamin (1892-1940), a prominent graduate of the University of Bern whose work combines different disciplinary strands within the humanities.

The WBKolleg consists of doctoral students, junior fellows and other young researchers. In addition, interdisciplinary bachelor's and master's degree programs are offered. The Kolleg’s President is elected by the Faculty of Humanities. Presidents have been: the musicologist Anselm Gerhard 2015-2019, Karénina Kollmar-Paulenz (2020-2021), Stefan Rebenich (since January 2022).

== Research and teaching ==
The Kolleg was funded in May 2015 in order to bring together the interdisciplinary centers, projects and range of courses at the Faculty of Humanities. It includes two research centers, the Interdisciplinary Research and Graduate Network, the Research Forum, and other projects:

Center for Global Studies (CGS): The CGS is a research center which examines current and historical processes of interdependence and separation in human life – over long distances and in different cultural contexts. It offers the doctoral program Global Studies, five master's degree programs and a bachelor's degree program.

Center for the Study of Language and Society (CSLS): The CSLS is a research center which focusses on the scientific examination of the relation between language and society and their mutual influence in the widest sense. Besides the doctoral program Studies of Language and Society the center offers a master's degree program in Sociolinguistics.

Interdisciplinary Research and Graduate Network (IRN) with the Graduate School of the Humanities (GSH): The IRN is an embedded institution for the support of young researchers on PhD and postdoc level. It consists of:

- the Graduate School of the Humanities (GSH) with its three doctoral programs Global Studies, Interdisciplinary Cultural Studies und Studies of Language and Society
- a fellowship program for postdocs (Junior Fellows)
- a master's degree program

Research Forum: With the Research Forum, the WBKolleg provides open platforms for the scientific exchange between researchers at the faculty working on related topics. It is to be understood as a “Market Place of Ideas” with a laboratory atmosphere, a low level of institutionalization, and great voluntary commitment. Its aim is the development of innovative fields and the facilitation of “bottom-up” research.

Projects
Friedrich Dürrenmatt Guest Professorship for World Literature: Since fall 2013, the Friedrich Dürrenmatt Guest Professorship serves the intermediation between science and literature, theory and practice, University and the general public. Each term an international author is working with students and doctoral students. In addition to that events for a wider public are organized. So far the Guest Professorship has been held by David Wagner, Joanna Bator, Louis-Philippe Dalembert, Wendy Law-Yone, Fernando Pérez, Wilfried N'Sondé, Juan Gabriel Vásquez, Josefine Klougart, Xialou Guo, Peter Stamm, Nedim Gürsel and Lizzie Doron. In the fall term of 2020 Mathias Énard from France holds the Guest Professorship. Distinguished Lectures Series (DLS): The DLS comprises a series of lectures on a certain topic, and invites scholars of world renown to give a talk and a connected workshop. Among its past speakers, the DLS has welcomed scholars such as Giorgio Agamben, Paul Gilroy, Homi Bhabha, Jacques Rancière, Judith Butler, and Alain Badiou.
