= Interface – Tech analysis and policy ideas for Europe =

German non-profit think tank

- interface – Tech analysis and policy ideas for Europe
- Formation: 2008; 18 years ago
- Location: Berlin, Germany
- Management Board: Anna Wohlfarth and Dr. Stefan Heumann
- Website: www.interface-eu.org/l

interface – Tech analysis and policy ideas for Europe (Interface) is a German non-profit think tank based in Berlin that specializes in public policy related to technology's effect on society. Until June 2024, its name was Stiftung Neue Verantwortung (SNV).

Interface deals with the topics of IT security, the data economy, state surveillance, digital fundamental rights and media transformation, as well as other Internet and technology-related topics. In 2021, Interface employed 19 experts from many disciplines.

== Topics and activities ==
Interface concentrates on political and societal topic areas relating to digitization and other technological and societal disruptions. Such topics include digital infrastructure, the automation of human work, IT and cyber security, and digital surveillance. It focuses primarily on current policy developments and ongoing societal debates. Analyses or practical guidelines geared toward policymaking are made available as policy papers, which include suggestions for stricter controls on the German Federal Intelligence Service, broadband policies and IT-security policies. Scenario studies investigate future technological and societal developments, like the transformation of the labor market through automated technologies, robotics and intelligent software. Other publications deal with the effects of technology on social cohesion.

In addition to publications, Interface hosts events for public discussion. Guests have included

- Klaus-Dieter Fritsche
- Sarah Harrison
- Andrei Soldatov
- Robby Mook

The SNV staff regularly participates in public academic debates and contributes to newspapers and online media outlets as guest experts.

== Political orientation and positions ==
During the reform of the German Intelligence Service Act in 2016 and 2020, Thorsten Wetzling, the head of the SNV "Digital Fundamental Rights, Surveillance and Transparency" project, advocated for stricter controls on the Federal Intelligence Service. Along with administrative modernization, demands were made for more data from authorities and administrative bodies to be made publicly available to citizens and startups.

In other papers, the project criticized the relaxation of net neutrality rules, and argued for more state intervention in the area of IT security, as well as for greater cooperation between civil society and government. SNV consistently take the positions of strengthening the protection of fundamental rights and privacy.

== Financing ==
According to its website, Interface had a budget of approximately 1.62 million euros in 2019, of which a great extent was granted by non-profit organizations, foundations and public institutions. Corporate contributions comprised 12 percent of the total budget. 28 patrons finance the organization in total.

In 2019, the SNV's largest patrons included the Open Society Foundations, Luminate, the Robert Bosch Foundation, the William and Flora Hewlett Foundation, the German Federal Foreign Office, and the Mercator Foundation.

== Organization and leadership ==
The executive board is responsible for the leadership of SNV. Members of the board are Anna Wohlfarth and Dr. Stefan Heumann.

== History ==
SNV was founded in 2008 with the original goal of offering young professionals from corporations, research institutions and civil-society organizations a platform to work on societal issues, publish and build relationships in Berlin for one year. Among its supporters at the time of its founding were the German Academy of Science and Engineering (Acatech), the Federation of German Industries (BDI), the Union of German Academies of Sciences and Humanities, and the former German Sports Confederation. The organization was financed through donations from corporations, including Friedhelm Loh, Beisheim Holding, EnBW, Bosch and Giesecke & Devrient.

Following a shift in the executive board at the end of 2014, SNV re-established itself as a think tank focusing on digitalization with a permanent, interdisciplinary staff. Financing thereafter was largely provided by grants from non-profit foundations or the public sector.
