= Lucy Hillebrand =

German architect (1906–1997)

Lucy Hillebrand (6 March 1906, in Mainz – 14 September 1997, in Göttingen) was a German architect.

== Biography ==
After growing up in an artistic milieu in Mainz, she went on to study architecture under Dominikus Böhm in Cologne. As a result of her talented approach, she soon won a number of competitions leading to successful commissions. While she was the youngest member of the Werkbund in 1928, Kurt Schwitters introduced her to the Bauhaus architect Robert Michels in Frankfurt. As one of the first independent architects in Germany, she set up her first practice there. Marriage and family did not hold her back: she simply took her young daughter to the office.

For a 12-year period while the Nazi regime was in power, as a "half-Jew" Hillebrand was unable to exercise her profession. Thanks to her husband Otto, she was nevertheless able to assist him on small commissions.

After her studios in Frankfurt and Hanover were destroyed during the war, she moved to Göttingen where she was one of the first architects to receive commissions for public buildings. Her more emancipated, simplistic designs for schools and churches proved effective. She continued in the same vein throughout her life, always willing to learn new approaches, especially for interior design. Her continuing interest can be seen in her plans for a museum for world religions for the Universal Exhibition of Architecture in Sofia in 1989. Strangely, always working for others, she never designed a home for herself.

Mainz honours Lucy Hillebrand with the naming of a road leading to the University of Applied Sciences Mainz.
