= Berthold Warnecke =

German opera director (born 1971)

Berthold Warnecke (born 15 February 1971) is a German dramaturge and Opera director in Würzburg.

== Career ==
Born in Münster, Warnecke studied musicology, Germanistic and Romance studies at the University of Münster and the Scuola di Paleografia e Filologia Musicale in Cremona. He received his doctorate in 1999, and in 1998 he was engaged as personal advisor to the General Music Director Will Humburg and as Music Dramaturge at the Theater Münster and the Münster Symphony Orchestra (until 2007).

From 2005 to 2007 he was a lecturer at the Musicology Seminar of the WWU-Münster. Since 2013 he has held a teaching position at the Communication Science Seminar of the University of Erfurt, where he has been a music dramaturgist in the ensemble of the Theater Erfurt since 2007.

Warnecke worked with the stage directors Marc Adam, Matthew Ferraro, Lorenzo Fioroni, Rosamund Gilmore, Jean-Louis Grinda, Michael Hampe, Dietrich Hilsdorf, Dominique Horwitz, Stephen Lawless, Guy Montavon, Gabriele Rech and Pamela Recinella, Werner Schneyder, Katharina Thalbach and Katharina Wagner.

Since the 2016/2017 season, Warnecke has been working as opera director at the Mainfranken Theater Würzburg.
