= University of Frankfurt =

University of Frankfurt may refer to:

- Goethe University Frankfurt (originally Universität Frankfurt am Main), in Frankfurt am Main, Hesse, Germany
- Viadrina European University or University of Frankfurt (Oder), in Frankfurt/Oder, Brandenburg, Germany
