= Anselm Gerhard =

German musicologist and opera scholar (born 1958)

Anselm Gerhard (born 30 March 1958) is a Swiss musicologist and opera scholar.

== Life and career ==
Anselm Gerhard was born in Heidelberg, Germany on 30 March 1958. He attended schools in Kiel and Mannheim. He studied with Ludwig Finscher at the University of Frankfurt from 1977 to 1979, and with Carl Dahlhaus at the Technische Universität Berlin (TUB) 1979 to 1982. He earned a master's degree from TUB in 1982, followed by a doctorate in 1985. His dissertation was on urbanization of 19th-century opera in Paris. He later completed his Habilitationsschrift in 1991 which was written on the instrumental music of Muzio Clementi.

From 1982 to 1985, Gerhard was a scholarship holder of the Volkswagen Foundation in Parma and Paris. From 1985 to 1992, Gerhard worked as a research assistant, and later as a university assistant, at the Musicology Department of the Westfälische Wilhelms-Universität (Habilitation 1992), from 1992 to 1994 he worked there as a university lecturer and was a German Research Foundation of the Deutsche Forschungsgemeinschaft.

From October 1994 to December 2021, Gerhard has been a full professor of musicology and director of the Institute for Musicology at the University of Bern. In addition, he has been a visiting professor at the universities of Fribourg, Pavia (Facoltà di musicologia in Cremona), Geneva and at the École normale supérieure in Paris; he has held guest lectureships at Stanford University, the Heidelberg, Basel and Zurich as well as the Musikhochschule Luzern. In 2006, he declined the call to the professorship for theatre studies at the University of Bayreuth combined with the direction of the Forschungsinstitut für Musiktheater in Thurnau castle. In 2009, he was awarded the Dent Medal by the Royal Musical Association (London) "for outstanding contributions to musicology".

From 1995 to 2001, Gerhard was President of the board of trustees for Music Research of the Academy 91 of Central Switzerland (Lucerne), from 1996 to 2002 founding President of the association Arbeitsstelle Schweiz Répertoire International des Sources Musicales (Bern), from 1997 to 2002 Director-at-large of the International Musicological Society, froù 1998 to 2002 member of the steering group musicology of the European Science Foundation (Strasbourg), and from 2000 to 2007, President of the Bern chapter of the Swiss Musicological Society. From 1997 until 2001, he was co-editor of the journal Musiktheorie, from 2001 to 2012, co-editor of the journal Schubert: Perspektiven, since 2002 he has been co-editor of the Schweizer Beiträge zur Musikforschung, since 2003 co-editor of the journal Verdi Forum. Journal of the American Institute for Verdi Studies. Since 2016, he has edited the newly founded journal Verdiperspektiven. From May 2015 to December 2019, he chaired the newly founded Walter Benjamin Kolleg at the University of Bern as president.

Gerhard's main research interests include 19th-century operas: with his book The Urbanisation of Opera, which is also available in English translation, he developed a perspective on the history of perception and mentality on French historical opera between Rossini and Meyerbeer as well as Verdi. His publications on Verdi are numerous, dealing not only with analytical questions but also with the social history of Italian opera and the composer's biography. His habilitation thesis London and Classicism in Music relates the emergence of the concept of instrumental music referring only to itself to the British aesthetic debate of the 18th century, thus highlighting the British root of the "idea of absolute music".

With a conference organised in Bern in 1996, the contributions to which appeared in print in 2000, Gerhard was among the first music historians to address the involvement of German musicology in the Nazi regime. In other contributions on the method and history of the discipline of musicology, he critically examined the habit of treating historical questions in the framework of national history.

== Publications ==
- Die Verstädterung der Oper. Paris und das Musiktheater des 19. Jahrhunderts. Metzler, Stuttgart/Weimar 1992, ISBN 3-476-00850-9; englisch: The Urbanization of Opera: Music Theater in Paris in the Nineteenth Century, translated by Mary Whittall. The University of Chicago Press, Chicago/London 1998.
- Musikwissenschaft – eine verspätete Disziplin? Die akademische Musikforschung in der ersten Hälfte des 20. Jahrhunderts zwischen Fortschrittsglauben und Modernitätsverweigerung. Edited by Anselm Gerhard. Metzler, Stuttgart 2000.
- Verdi-Handbuch. edited by Anselm Gerhard and Uwe Schweikert. Metzler, Stuttgart/Weimar 2001, 2. überarbeitete Auflage 2013.
- London und der Klassizismus in der Musik. Die Idee der „absoluten Musik“ und Muzio Clementis Klavierwerk. Metzler, Stuttgart/Weimar 2002.
- „Musizieren, Lieben – und Maulhalten!“ Albert Einsteins Beziehungen zur Musik. edited by Ivana Rentsch and Anselm Gerhard. Schwabe, Basel 2006.
- Giuseppe Verdi. Beck, München 2012.
- Antonio Ghislanzoni: Wie macht man eine italienische Oper? Italienisch/deutsch [L’arte di far libretti (1870)]. edited by Anselm Gerhard. (Taschenbücher zur Musikwissenschaft, 163). Noetzel, Wilhelmshaven 2014.
