= Leibniz Institute of European History =

Historical research institute in Mainz, Germany

The Leibniz Institute of European History (IEG) in Mainz, Germany, is an independent, public research institute that carries out and promotes historical research on the foundations of Europe in the early and late Modern period. Though autonomous in nature, the IEG has close connections to the Johannes Gutenberg University Mainz. In 2012, it joined the Leibniz Association.

== History of the institute ==
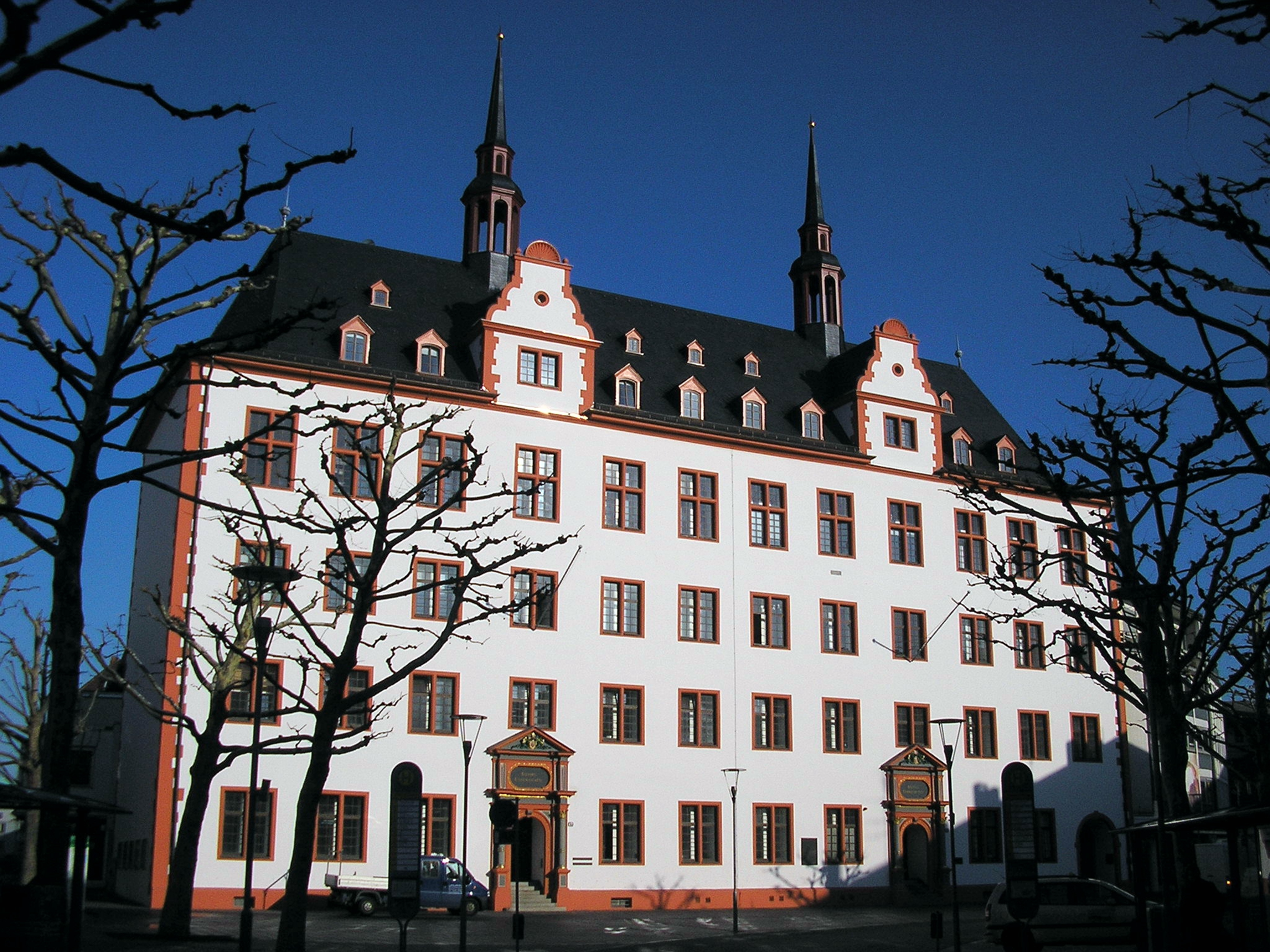
Institute of European History

Founded in 1950 on the initiative of Raymond Schmittlein, the head of the Direction Générale des Affaires Culturelles of the French military government, the new institution had the aim of helping to overcome the longstanding nationalist and confessional divides between the European states and their populations through "non-prejudiced" historical research and, in so doing, to support Franco-German reconciliation in particular. Specifically, it was intended that research conducted at the institute would assist a revision ("detoxification") of the history (text)books, and eventually enable the establishment of a "European history book".

This idea had surfaced in the late-1940s during dialogues between German and French historians in Speyer, which Schmittlein had set up in 1948/49. It became mixed with concepts of a Christian, "Occidental" history which were prevalent among a group of German historians, which included the medieval historian Fritz Kern (1884–1950) based in Bonn. He had headed the German delegation in 1948. The Catholic theologian and church historian Joseph Lortz (1887–1975) had also participated in these dialogues.

The first plans for the foundation of an "Institute for cultural and religious history" were drafted by Kern, who – as the first director of the institute – in addition to the didactic goal also wanted to realize a multi-volume history of the world ("Historia Mundi") that would be based on religion and would adopt a universal-historical perspective. Lortz served as an additional founding director. In 1950, he took up an extraordinary professorship for western religious history which was created especially for him in the philosophical faculty of Mainz University. These founding aims and history explain the structure of the research institute that was established in 1950 under the title "Institut für Europäische Geschichte" (IEG) (its charter came into effect on 19 April 1951), with its department of "Western Religious History" (Abteilung fuer Abendlaendische Religionsgeschichte) and its department of "Universal History" (Abteilung fuer Universalgeschichte). Both departments were headed up by a director, as they still are (currently Irene Dingel and Johannes Paulmann). Today, the directors also hold professorships at Johannes Gutenberg University Mainz.

== Function and research areas ==
The IEG's research on the historical foundations of Europe considers both integrating and antagonistic movements and forces shaping the geographic continent as well as the cultural context of Europe over centuries and setting up its distinct characteristics in contrast to the other continents. Research at the IEG thus targets pan-European and partly European communicative connections originating in bilateral and multilateral transfer processes. Their protagonists did not necessarily have to be aware of their taking part in "Europe-wide" interrelations. The religious and confessional developments of these transfer processes are one important focus of research at the IEG.

Also, research on the foundations of Europe maps the history of conscious reflections on Europe and Europeans, and analyses attempts at political unification, existing political plans for Europe, ideal conceptions and utopian visions of Europe – always including anti-European ideas in the picture. An integral element of this approach is the history of historiography on Europe.

This conceptual formulation includes a reflexion of theory and methods of historical research on Europe. The Leibniz Institute of European History questions the focus of interest of 'European' approaches and reflects the underlying ideological propositions in historical research on the history of Europe.

The institute's charter defines the primary goals of the IEG as follows: "Research on the religious and intellectual traditions of Europe, their development and crises, and particularly on religious differences, their effects and the possibilities of overcoming these differences", and "Europe-focused fundamental research which assists the historical understanding of the process of the coalescence of Europe and the individual historical paths of the European states and peoples". In accordance with its charter, IEG pursues these goals through:

- its own research projects conducted by staff members individually or jointly with other academics from Germany and abroad
- the funding it provides to young postgraduate researchers from Europe and the other continents, who work on research projects on European history and who live at the institute as fellows and scholarship holders
- collaboration with other institutions in Germany and abroad that pursue similar aims
- its own publications and the support it provides to other publications, in which contentious aspects of research on European history are discussed
- the transfer of knowledge to the wider society

== Current research programme ==
The Leibniz Institute of European History (IEG) researches the historical foundations of Europe in the modern era. Its research projects are developed in an interdisciplinary way by the sections "Abendländische Religionsgeschichte" and "Universalgeschichte". They span the historical periods from the beginning of the early modern period to contemporary history. The central theme of the current research programme at the IEG is "negotiating difference" – the ways in which difference is established, confronted and enabled in its religious, cultural, political and social dimensions.

Together with the Johannes Gutenberg University Mainz, the IEG runs the graduate project "The Christian Churches and the Challenge of 'Europe'”, which is part-funded by the German Research Foundation (Deutsche Forschungsgemeinschaft – DFG).

== Research fellowship programme ==
Since 1950, the IEG has awarded doctoral and postdoctoral fellowships for research stays in Mainz. It also welcomes international researchers as fellows in residence with external funding. The IEG states that its research fellowship programme combines research, training and international networking. Fellows can pursue their individual research projects. They discuss problems and methods of European historical research in an interdisciplinary and international surrounding. According to their special fields and interests, they are invited to participate in the academic activities of the institute. In cooperation with its international partners, the institute supports the exchange of fellows to embed them in a network of European historical research.

The Leibniz Institute of European History (IEG) awards research scholarships and fellowships to young academics (doctoral and postdoctoral researchers) from Germany and abroad. Funding is provided for both doctoral and postdoctoral research dealing with the religious, political, social and cultural history of Europe from the early modern period to 1989/90. Comparative, transnational and transfer-historical research projects are particularly welcome, as are projects which deal with topics of intellectual, church or theological history. In 2013, the IEG established the Senior Research Fellowship Programme for established researchers. It enables the directors to invite respected academics from other European countries and outside Europe to Mainz to pursue their own research and to exchange ideas with the academics working at the IEG. For decades, the IEG has been receiving other scholarship holders and fellows funded by organizations abroad and in Germany (for example, the Alexander von Humboldt Foundation and the DAAD) as visiting academics. Additionally, the institute participates in the Leibniz-DAAD Research Fellowship Programme. These visiting researchers, who are usually young academics, usually stay at the institute where they become part of the international community of IEG fellows and scholarship holders.

== Digital humanities and open access ==
The IEG works to promote innovative Open Access publications, the use of digital tools in historical research, and the expansion of digital research infrastructures. Far beyond the confines of academia, there exists a wide interest in research findings and resources published in Open Access – for instance, the wide range of digitized historical maps or European History Online (EGO), published in German and English, which provides an overview of 500 years of modern European history across boundaries of geography, discipline, and methodology. Core questions of European history are also addressed in the Jahrbuch für Europäische Geschichte/European History Yearbook, which has been published in an Open Access format since 2014 and contains articles in English and German.

Another Open Access publication, "On site, in time – Negotiating differences in Europe", looks at events that took place in European locations and cast new light on the historical development of Europe since 1500. Approximately 60 articles illustrate the manifold conflict-laden approaches to difference and inequality have been.

The Leibniz Institute of European History (IEG) is part of the new Mainz Centre for Digitality in the Humanities and Cultural Studies (mainzed). mainzed is a joint initiative of six scientific institutions to promote digital methodology in the humanities and cultural sciences in Mainz, Germany.

== Library ==
The library offers approximately 90,000 printed titles and 900,000 licensed online resources on the history of Europe from the mid-15th century. There is an emphasis on general European history and international history, as well as on church history and the history of theology since the period of Humanism and the Reformation.

The library holds numerous international learned journals and periodicals, with more than 500 running subscriptions (see the Overview of Journals ZDB). Additionally, a large number of both special and general bibliographical aids are available. The library's entire collection is contained in the institute's Online Catalogue (OPAC). The catalogue also contains the new acquisitions of the current year and a large array of online resources and databases funded by the German Research Foundation. In the context of the HeBIS union of libraries, the institute's library is part of the local library system (Lokales Bibliothekssystem – LBS) of Rhine-Hesse (organization and technical support is provided by Mainz University Library).

== Publications ==
The IEG edits a monograph serial and a serial for conference reports, the latter being published online or in print. It runs a server for historical digital maps (IEG-MAPS) and publishes European peace treaties of the early modern period.
