= Heinrich Joseph Wassermann =

German-Swiss violinist, composer and conductor

Heinrich Joseph Wassermann (3 April 1791 – 3 September 1838) was a German-Swiss violinist, composer and conductor.

== Life and career ==
Wassermann was born in Schwarzbach near Fulda, the son of the village musician Johann Wassermann (1757–1815). After he was first taught in 1802 by Michael Henkel in Fulda, he held teaching positions and subsequently played in several spa orchestras. In 1810, he was trained by the violinist Louis Spohr in Gotha. His good testimony earned him a position as chamber musician in the Meiningen Court Orchestra in 1811. In 1817, he followed the call as music director of the Allgemeine Musik-Gesellschaft Zürich. From 1820 to 1829 he was 1st violinist at the court chapel in Donaueschingen. This position allowed him to undertake concert and study trips, among others to Darmstadt to the court organist Johann Christian Heinrich Rinck. In 1829, he became music director of the "Société de musique" in Geneva, in the same year he got a job in Basel.

He died in Riehen near Basel at age 47.
