= Will Humburg =

German conductor (born 1957)

Will Humburg (born 1957) is a German conductor. He was born in Hamburg, and studied there with Horst Stein and Christoph von Dohnányi. After appointments at the Theater Bremen and Theater Hagen and guest appearances in Italy he was appointed director of the "Laboratorio Lirico" festival of contemporary music in Piedmont, where he conducted a series of world and national premières of modern music.

From 1992 to 2004 he was chief conductor of the Theater Münster, and the Sinfonieorchester Münster. Among his work in Münster were productions of Wagner's Ring cycle (1999–2001), other repertoire works by Wagner and Verdi, and modern works. He became associated with the music of Azio Corghi, with whom he has worked on four operas. Among other contemporary composers with whom he is associated are György Ligeti, Krzysztof Penderecki, Luigi Nono, Hans Werner Henze and Wolfgang Rihm.

Humburg has conducted complete recordings of La bohème, Il barbiere di Siviglia, Il trovatore and Falstaff.
