= Mainz University of Applied Sciences =

German university

- Hochschule Mainz
- Type: Public
- Established: Founded in 1996 Predecessor institutions: Electoral Academy of Painting and Sculpture, Mainz (founded 1757) Grand Ducal State Construction School, Darmstadt (founded 1876)
- President: Prof. Dr. Katharina Dahm
- Faculty: 160 (as of July 1, 2024)
- Total staff: 566 (as of July 1, 2024)
- Students: 5,455 (as of the 2025/26 winter semester)
- Location: Mainz, Rhineland-Palatinate, Germany
- Website: www.hs-mainz.de/en/

Mainz University of Applied Sciences (German: Hochschule Mainz, prior to 2017: Fachhochschule Mainz) is a University of Applied Sciences in the German state of Rhineland-Palatinate. Together with Johannes Gutenberg University Mainz and the Catholic University of Applied Sciences, it is one of three public higher education institutions in Mainz, the state capital of Rhineland-Palatinate. The university has five locations, including a main campus. Through its dual studies programs, it collaborates with more than 600 companies and maintains partnerships with around 150 universities worldwide, offering specialized exchange programs.

The range of programs at the university includes bachelor’s and master’s degrees offered in traditional full-time programs as well as dual studies or part-time programs integrating work at companies. In addition, the university has a variety of continuing education master’s programs for working professionals.

In the 2025/26 winter semester, Mainz University of Applied Sciences had a total enrollment of 5,455 students. Approximately 75 percent were enrolled in bachelor’s degree programs, while the remaining 25 percent were pursuing master’s degrees.

Since March 2026, Katharina Dahm has been the President of Mainz University of Applied Sciences.

== History ==
Mainz University of Applied Sciences traces its roots to two educational institutions in the former Grand Duchy of Hesse.

- One predecessor was the Craftsmen’s Drawing School (Handwerker-Zeichenschule), founded in Mainz in 1841. It was renamed the School of Arts and Crafts (Kunst- und Gewerbeschule) in 1894 and later the State School of Art and Crafts (Staatsschule für Kunst und Handwerk) in 1933, before being dissolved in 1939. Its origins can be traced further back to the Electoral Academy of Painting and Sculpture (Kurfürstlichen Maler- und Bildhauerakademie, founded in 1757.
- The second predecessor was the Grand Ducal State Construction School (Großherzoglichen Landesbaugewerkschule), founded in Darmstadt in 1876. Renamed the State Building School (Staatsbauschule) in 1933, the school and its teaching staff were relocated to Mainz in 1936 and continued under the name Adolf Hitler Building School (Adolf-Hitler-Bauschule). The school building was destroyed during an air raid in February 1945.

Following the Second World War, the State Building School and State Art School (Staatsbauschule und Landeskunstschule) were ceremoniously reopened on October 3, 1946, in the Auditorium Maximum, the largest lecture hall of Johannes Gutenberg University Mainz. From 1955 onward, the two main schools were housed in a new building at Holzstraße 36. In 1957, the State Building School was renamed the Mainz State Engineering School for Building and Surveying (Staatsbauschule in Staatliche Ingenieurschule für Bau- und Vermessungswesen Mainz), and in 1959, the State Art School became Mainz State School of Applied Arts Mainz (Staatliche Werkkunstschule Mainz). Additional building extensions and facilities at the Holzstraße site were inaugurated in 1963.

In the 1960s, academic offerings were expanded to include economics when the School of Business for the Rheinhessen Region (Höhere Wirtschaftsfachschule für die Region Rheinhessen) commenced operations. The legal foundation for the Universities of Applied Sciences in Rhineland-Palatinate was laid on June 1, 1970, with the adoption of the University of Applied Sciences Act. In 1971, the State Engineering School and the State School of Applied Arts Mainz were integrated into Rhineland-Palatinatee University of Applied Sciences.

A new University of Applied Sciences Act, which came into effectr on September 1, 1996, divided the statewide institution into seven independent universities of applied sciences. This re-established Mainz University of Applied Sciences as an independent institution with three schools: Engineering, Design, and Business.

On September 1, 2014, Mainz University of Applied Sciences officially changed its German name from Fachhochschule Mainz to Hochschule Mainz. The university continues to hold the legal status of a university of applied sciences.

== Teaching and Research ==
=== Schools and degree programs ===
The range of degree programs at Mainz University of Applied Sciences is structured into three schools:

School of Engineering: Applied Informatics, Architecture, Civil Engineering, Construction and Property Management/Facility Management, Industrial Engineering (Construction), and Geodesy.

School of Design: Communication Design, Interior Architecture, and Media Design/Time-Based Media.

School of Business: Business Administration, Cyber Security Management, International Business, IT Management, Business Law, Information Systems, and Digital Media.

=== Research and technology transfer ===
Research at Mainz University of Applied Sciences is conducted within the three schools – Engineering, Design, and Business. The university’s research profile focuses on four key areas and one emerging area:

Key research areas

- Spatial Information and Surveying Technology
- Digital Cultural Heritage, Media and Design
- Digital Innovation & Entrepreneurship
- Sustainable Materials and Structures

Emerging research area

- Artificial Intelligence and Robotics

The university promotes interdisciplinarity, cross-school collaboration, and a strong connection between research and teaching. Applied research projects are done in close cooperation with partners from academia, industry, and public institutions. These range from practice-oriented theses and doctoral projects to externally funded research and development initiatives.

Institutionally, research at the university is structured around eight institutes and further specialized research groups:

- i3mainz – Institute for Spatial Information and Surveying Technology
- iS-mainz – Institute for Innovative Structures
- AI MAINZ – Institute of Architecture of Mainz University of Applied Sciences
- idg – Gutenberg Design Lab
- img – Institute for Media Design
- ifams – Institute for Applied Management in the Social Economy
- iuh – Institute for Entrepreneurial Action
- IREC – Institute for Real Estate and Construction Management

Research groups and laboratories:

- Authorized Building Materials Testing Laboratory
- Lighting Laboratory
- Research Group for Municipal and Environmental Economics
- Research Group for Information Systems
- Market Research Lab
- Virtual Studio

=== Alliances and partnerships ===
Mainz University of Applied Sciences has been a member of the Mainz Science Alliance since 2008. In 2015, together with five other academic institutions, it co-founded the Mainz Center for Digitality in the Humanities and Cultural Studies (mainzed).

The university is also a partner of the Fraunhofer Vision Alliance, a network within the Fraunhofer Society focusing on image processing and machine vision.

The Department of Research and Transfer serves as the central point of contact for collaboration between academia and industry.

== Locations ==
Mainz University of Applied Sciences has five locations:

Campus Lucy-Hillebrand-Straße 2 (49°59′03″N 8°13′42″E)

- School of Business
  - iuh – Institute for Entrepreneurial Action
  - ifams – Institute for Applied Management in the Social Economy
- School of Engineering – Department of Applied Informatics and Geodesy
  - i3mainz – Institute for Spatial Information and Surveying Technology
- Central administration

Holzstraße 36 (49°59′50″N 8°16′45″E)

- School of Engineering – Departments of Architecture and Civil Engineering
  - AI MAINZ – Institute of Architecture of Mainz University of Applied Sciences
  - iS-mainz – Institute of Innovative Structures
- School of Design – Departments of Interior Architecture and Communication Design
  - Gutenberg Design Lab

Wallstraße 11

- School of Design – Departments of Media Design/Time-Based Media
  - img – Institute for Media Design

Holzhofstraße 8 (parts of the Communication Design degree program, parts of the Architecture degree program, parts of the Interior Architecture degree program)

Rheinstraße (master’s programs of the Departments of Interior Architecture and Communication Design)

LUX Pavilion

The LUX Pavilion is an exhibition space of Mainz University of Applied Sciences located on Ludwigsstraße in Mainz’s Old Town district (Altstadt). It showcases teaching, research, and transfer activities from the university’s schools of Design, Engineering, and Business. The pavilion hosts regular exhibitions of final projects, workshops, and conferences and is open to the general public and all interested visitors free of charge.

== Structural development ==
For many years, the state of Rhineland-Palatinate pursued the construction of a new campus for Mainz University of Applied Sciences, as the university had been spread across several locations throughout the city. In the 2009 summer semester, the Central Administration, the School of Business, the Department of Geoinformatics and Surveying, and the Institute for Spatial Information and Surveying Technology (i3mainz) moved into the newly completed campus complex on Lucy-Hillebrand-Straße.

The new site (49°59′3″N, 8°13′42″E) is located in the western part of Mainz and is separated from Johannes Gutenberg University Mainz by Koblenzer Straße. A student residence hall (K 3) with housing for approximately 500 students is situated in the immediate vicinity. The Holzstraße and Wallstraße locations continue to be used alongside the new campus.

Overall, the new campus has been well received by students and teaching staff. However, it has also attracted criticism. The space allocation plan for the first construction phase dates back to the 1990s and no longer fully reflects current enrollment figures. As a result, the facilities of the first phase reached full capacity soon after completion. Gerhard Muth, who served as President of Mainz University of Applied Sciences from November 2006 to February 2020, identified the revision and expansion of the second construction phase as a key priority during his term.

In June 2020, the groundbreaking ceremony for the second construction phase took place with the outgoing president Gerhard Muth and his successor, Susanne Weissman. The second construction phase is scheduled to be occupied in 2026.

== See also ==
- Fachhochschule
- List of colleges and universities
- Mainz
