= Johannes Paulmann =

German historian of the modern age (born 1960)

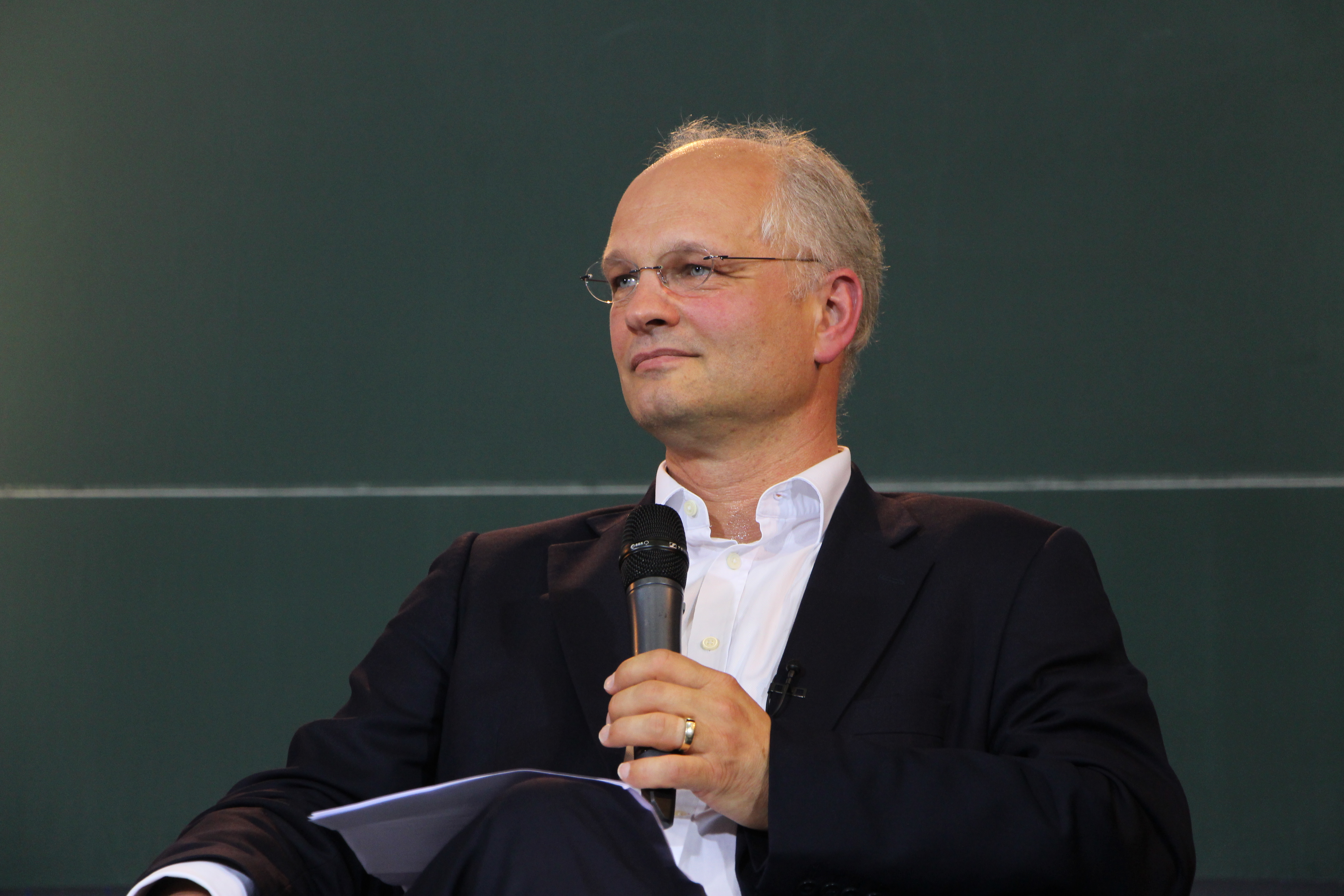
Johannes Paulmann at the Historikertag 2014 in Göttingen

Johannes Paulmann (born 4 October 1960 in Darmstadt, West Germany) is a German historian.

== Education ==
Paulmann studied history and English at LMU Munich and the University of Leicester. Afterwards, he worked as an adult educator and as a researcher at the University of Tübingen, LMU Munich, and the University of London. In 1991, he finished his doctorate, his dissertation titled Staat und Arbeitsmarkt in Großbritannien (The State and the Labor Market in Great Britain), which was supervised by Gerhard A. Ritter. In 1999, he finished his habilitation thesis Pomp und Politik (Pomp and Politics), for which he received an award from the Association of German Historians at the Deutscher Historikertag in 2002.

== Academic career ==
Between 2000 and 2002, Paulmann was a substitute professor at LMU Munich. At the International University Bremen, he worked as a history professor from 2002 until 2006, where he was the first holder of the Helmut Schmidt Chair of International History. Between 2006 and 2011, Paulmann was professor of recent and modern history at the University of Mannheim. In October 2011, he became a Director of the Leibniz Institute of European History. At the same time, Paulmann became a professor of modern history at the University of Mainz. He was a visiting professor at Emory University in Atlanta, at the London School of Economics, and at Magdalen College at the University of Oxford. From October 2014 to June 2015, Paulmann was the Richard von Weizsäcker Fellow at St Antony’s College at the University of Oxford.

His research interests concern 19th and 20th century European and German history, especially transnational developments in these centuries. Paulmann is currently working on the history of humanitarian aid in the 19th and 20th centuries. In cooperation with the International Committee of the Red Cross, he oversees research on worldwide humanitarian work from the past 150 years.

Paulmann has been a member of different academic boards and associations, including the Historical Commission at the Bavarian Academy of Sciences and Humanities, the Gutenberg Academy for Young Researchers, and the Association of German Historians.

== Publications ==
Monographs (selection)

- Pomp und Politik. Monarchenbegegnungen in Europa zwischen Ancien Régime und Erstem Weltkrieg. Schöningh, Paderborn 2000. (At the same time: Ludwig-Maximilians-Universität München, habilitation thesis, 1999)
- Staat und Arbeitsmarkt in Großbritannien. Krise, Weltkrieg, Wiederaufbau (Publications of the German Historical Institute London. Vol. 32). Vandenhoeck & Ruprecht, Göttingen u.a. 1993 (Partially at the same time: Munich, University, habilitation thesis)
- Arbeitslosigkeit in Großbritannien 1931–1939. Sozial- und Wirtschaftspolitik zwischen Weltwirtschaftskrise und Weltkrieg (Publications of the German Association for the Study of British History and Politics. Vol. 14). Brockmeyer, Bochum 1989.
- Globale Vorherrschaft und Fortschrittsglaube. Europa 1850-1914 C.H. Beck, Munich 2019, ISBN 978-3-406-62350-9

Journal articles (selection)

- "Regionen und Welten: Arenen und Akteure regionaler Weltbeziehungen seit dem 19. Jahrhundert", in: Historische Zeitschrift 296 (2013), pp. 660–699.
- "The Straits of Europe: History at the Margins of a Continent", in: Bulletin of the German Historical Institute Washington 52 (Spring 2013), pp. 7–28.
- "Conjunctures in the History of International Humanitarian Aid during the Twentieth Century", in: Humanity 4/2 (2013), pp. 215–238.

As editor (selection)

- (with Gregor Feindt and Bernhard Gissibl): Kulturelle Souveränität: Politische Deutungs- und Handlungsmacht jenseits des Staates im 20. Jahrhundert. Vandenhoeck & Ruprecht, Göttingen 2017.
- Dilemmas of Humanitarian Aid in the Twentieth Century. Oxford University Press, Oxford 2016.
- (with Matthias Schnettger and Thomas Weller): Unversöhnte Verschiedenheit: Verfahren zur Bewaeltigung religiös-konfessioneller Differenz in der europäischen Neuzeit. Vandenhoeck & Ruprecht, Göttingen 2016.
- (with Christiane Fritsche): „Arisierung“ und „Wiedergutmachung“ in deutschen Städten. Böhlau, Cologne et al. 2014.
- Ritual – Macht – Natur: europäisch-ozeanische Beziehungswelten in der Neuzeit. Überseemuseum, Bremen 2005.
- Auswärtige Repräsentationen. Deutsche Kulturdiplomatie nach 1945. Böhlau, Cologne et al. 2005.
- (with Martin H. Geyer): The mechanics of internationalism: culture, society and politics from the 1840s to the First World War. Oxford University Press, Oxford 2001.
