= Heidelberg Academy of Sciences and Humanities =

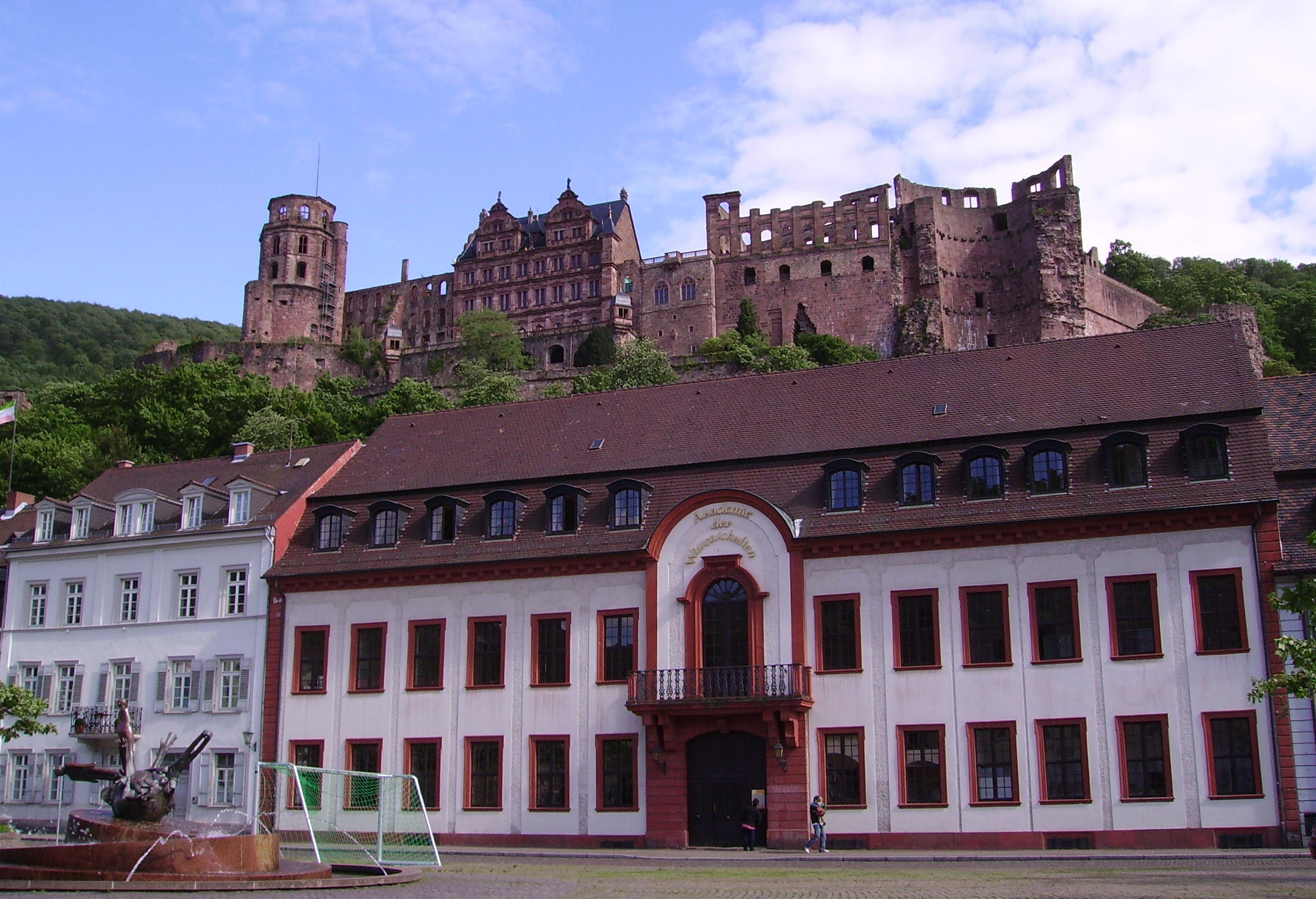
The Heidelberg Academy of Sciences and Humanities

The Heidelberg Academy of Sciences and Humanities (German: Heidelberger Akademie der Wissenschaften), established in 1909 in Heidelberg, Germany, is an assembly of scholars and scientists in the German state of Baden-Wuerttemberg.

The academy is a member of the Union of German Academies of Sciences and Humanities.
