= European History Online =

European History Online / EGO
- Website type: Publication platform
- Available in: German, English
- Owner: Institute of European History
- Website: www.ieg-ego.eu
- Commercial: No
- Launched: 2010
- Current status: Open

European History Online (Europäische Geschichte Online, EGO) is an academic website that publishes articles on the history of Europe between the period of 1450 and 1950 according to the principle of open access.

== Organisation ==
EGO is issued by the Leibniz Institute of European History in Mainz in cooperation with the Center for Digital Humanities in Trier and the Bavarian State Library, Munich. The editorial board comprises the two directors of the Institute as well as 25 European scholars of history. The project is funded by the federal state of the Rhineland-Palatinate and by the German Research Foundation.

== Conception ==
EGO investigates the history of modern Europe from a transcultural/transnational perspective, in interdisciplinary cooperation and across methodological boundaries. Articles are published in English and German and provide additional contextual materials (such as images, maps, videos, digitized sources, music etc.). The articles are categorized and can be accessed via ten thematic threads:

- Theories and Methods: Methodological and theoretical approaches to a transcultural history of Europe
- Backgrounds: Europe as a Communicative Space – Prerequisites and Backgrounds
- Crossroads: Spaces of Concentrated Communication
- Models and Stereotypes: The Formation of Models and Stereotypes in Intercultural Transfer Processes
- Europe on the Road: Migrants and Travellers as Mediators of Intercultural Transfer
- European Media: The Media and Media Events
- European Networks: The Transfer of Ideas, Technologies and Practices in Networks of Personal Relationships
- Transnational Movements & Organisations: Groups with cross-border programmes and structures
- Alliances and Wars: Rejection and Learning through Military Victories and Defeats
- Europe and the World: Entanglements between and Reflections of "Europe" and the Non-European World
