= Hans-Joachim Hinrichsen =

Hans-Joachim Hinrichsen (born 21 August 1952) is a German musicologist.

== Career ==
Born in Westerland on Sylt, Hinrichsen studied Germanistic and History at the Free University of Berlin. The completion of the Staatsexamen (1980) was followed by a teaching phase at Gymnasium. Subsequently, he studied musicology at the FU Berlin, which he completed with a PhD in 1992.

From 1989 to 1994 he was a research assistant at the Musicological Institute of the F.U Berlin. In 1998, he gained his habilitation with a dissertation about Musikalische Interpretation als kulturelle Praxis. Hans von Bülow und die ästhetische Konstruktion der deutschen Musik.

Since 1999 Hinrichsen has been professor of musicology at the University of Zurich. In 2008 he was elected member of the Academia Europaea.

Hinrichsen is co-editor of the Archiv für Musikwissenschaft and Schubert: Perspektiven at Franz Steiner Verlag. In addition, he was president of the Allgemeine Musik-Gesellschaft Zürich (AMG) from 2001 until 2007 and, to the present day, the International Bach Society Schaffhausen (IBG).

His research interests include Johann Sebastian Bach and Franz Schubert as well as music analytical studies.

== Publications ==
- Untersuchungen zur Entwicklung der Sonatenform in der Instrumentalmusik Franz Schuberts. Tutzing 1994
- Franz Schubert. Verlag C. H. Beck, Munich 2011. ISBN 978-3-406-62135-2.
- Beethoven. Die Klaviersonaten. Bärenreiter-Verlag, Kassel 2013. ISBN 978-3-7618-1890-9.
