= Bohuslav Martinů Complete Edition =

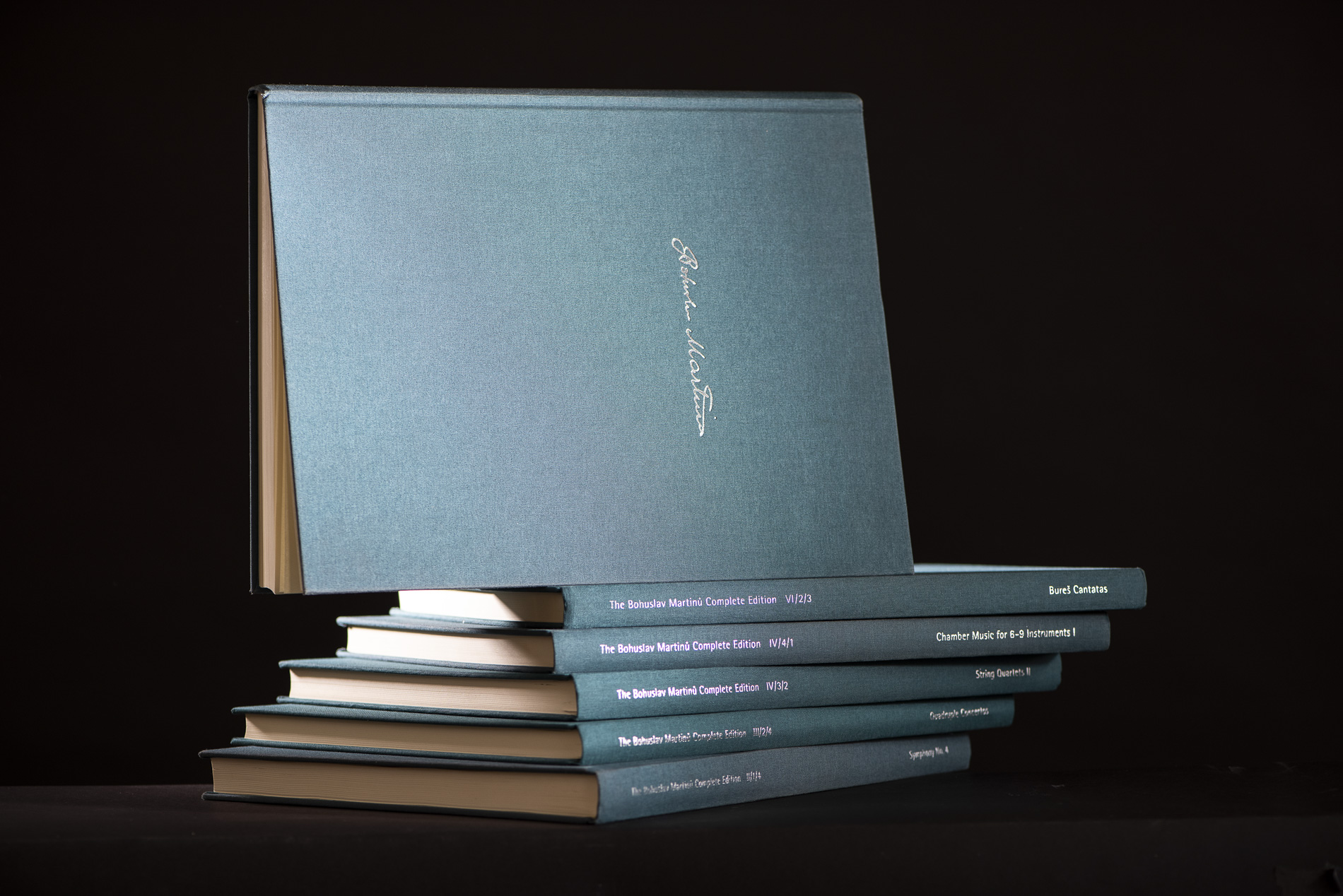
Bohuslav Martinů Complete Edition

The Bohuslav Martinů Complete Edition (BMCE; Czech: Souborné vydání děl Bohuslava Martinů) is a complete historical critical edition of all the finished and unfinished compositions of Czech composer Bohuslav Martinů (1890–1959). It is based on the scholarly assessment of all available sources and analysed with the newest methods of textual criticism and music philology. The BMCE is a highly complex undertaking that offers numerous organisational, legal, and academic challenges. The first volume was published in 2014, and the project is scheduled to issue a total of 106 volumes in the course of 53 years. For these reasons, the BMCE is regarded as the pre-eminent undertaking of contemporary Czech music publishing.

== Complete edition ==
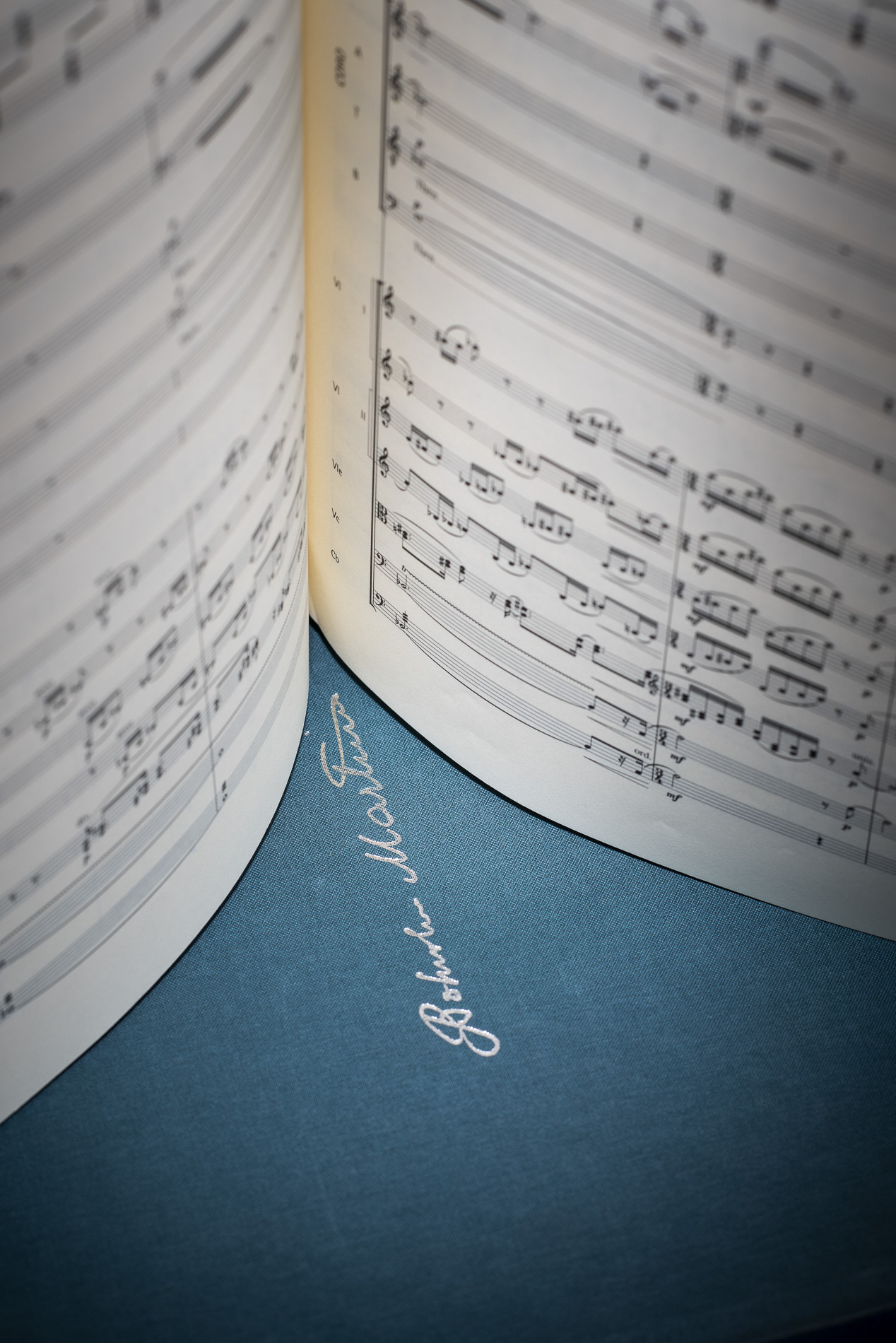
A volume of the edition

Previously, many of Bohuslav Martinů’s compositions were either unaccounted for, available only as low-quality reproductions of autographs or manuscript copies, or provided with inadequate editions; published works contained errors and problematic performance solutions or were out of print or otherwise inaccessible. For this reason alone, a new critical edition is a much-needed enterprise in the fields of music philology, interpretation, and history, even if it were to provide no new findings or unpublished compositions.

The BMCE is based on meticulous scholarly work, the research of primary sources, and the latest methodological standards and experience in music philology. It imparts new readings of the musical text and fresh findings on the genesis of the work. The international editorial board is furnished with experience from other complete editions published throughout Europe. The edition is intended for both practical use by musicians and theoretical study by musicologists and researchers. Using deep analyses of primary sources, it articulates the composer’s intentions in the truest possible form. Extensive forewords and critical reports also present the latest findings; besides the "last authorised version", alternative original readings are provided alongside interventions by musicians, publishers, and producers. The editorial guidelines match cutting-edge trends in contemporary music publishing (download here) while respecting the peculiarities of the composer’s notation. Therefore, their application may differ slightly between individual volumes. A detailed overview of the editorial guidelines, the structure of separate volumes, and the publication schedule was published in Hudební věda by the Director of the Bohuslav Martinů Institute in 2004.

Many autographs and prints of Martinů’s compositions are scattered throughout various countries, practically inaccessible, or missing completely. Many of his published works remain bound to publishing houses around the world and are thus largely unavailable. The Bohuslav Martinů Complete Edition has taken up the difficult task of bringing the oeuvre of this major composer of the twentieth century to the broader public for the first time in its complexity, including the publication of previously unknown or unfinished compositions and the composer’s sketch books.

The BMCE is being published by Bärenreiter-Verlag, Kassel, through its Czech branch, Bärenreiter Praha (the successor to the Czech state music publisher Supraphon). A number of universities, music archives, and other institutions in both Europe and America have already subscribed to the edition. The first published volumes have already reached the concert stage – and Martinů’s works are thus being performed in new, critical versions. To name a few examples, Symphony No. 4 and The Epic of Gilgamesh were performed by the Czech Philharmonic under Jiří Bělohlávek, while The Spectre’s Bride was rendered by Jiří Rožeň and the Brno Philharmonic. The BMCE also aspires to disseminate lesser known, previously unpublished, or newly discovered compositions to the repertoires of world-famous ensembles.

"This new complete edition - which I strongly recommend to music libraries and serious Martinů enthusiasts alike - should do much to bring his music in from the margins." says the musicologist Nigel Simeone, an expert on twentieth-century music. The German critic Christoph Flamm reckons that the BMCE "fulfils the greatest expectations."

== Financing of the BMCE ==
The complete edition of Martinů's works is a project that makes exacting demands on funding, timing, and staffing. At present, it is co-financed by the Czech Science Foundation, the Bohuslav Martinů Foundation, Martinů Stiftung in Basel, and the State Cultural Fund of the Czech Republic.

== Editorial board ==
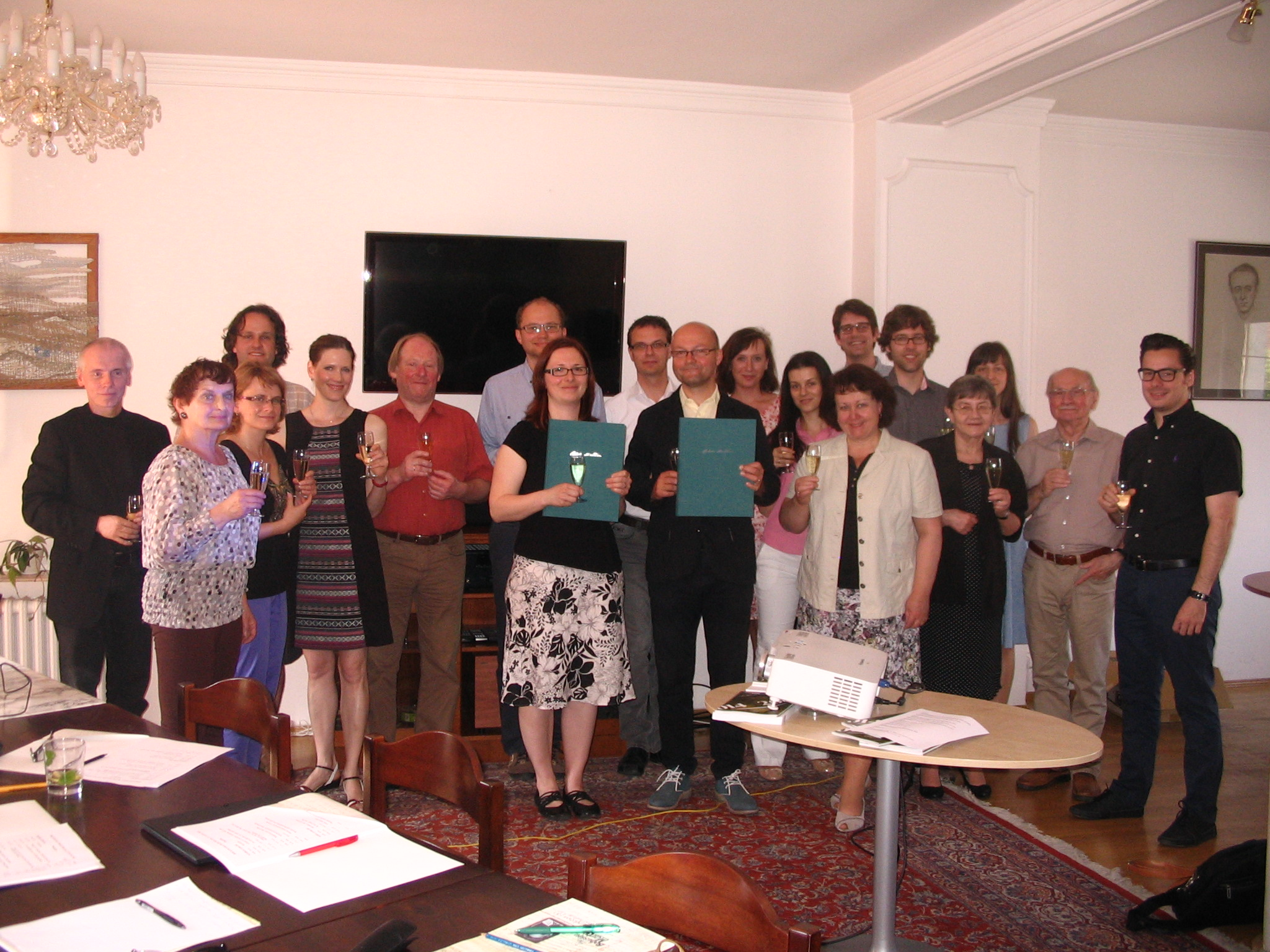
Formal session of the BMCE Editorial Board

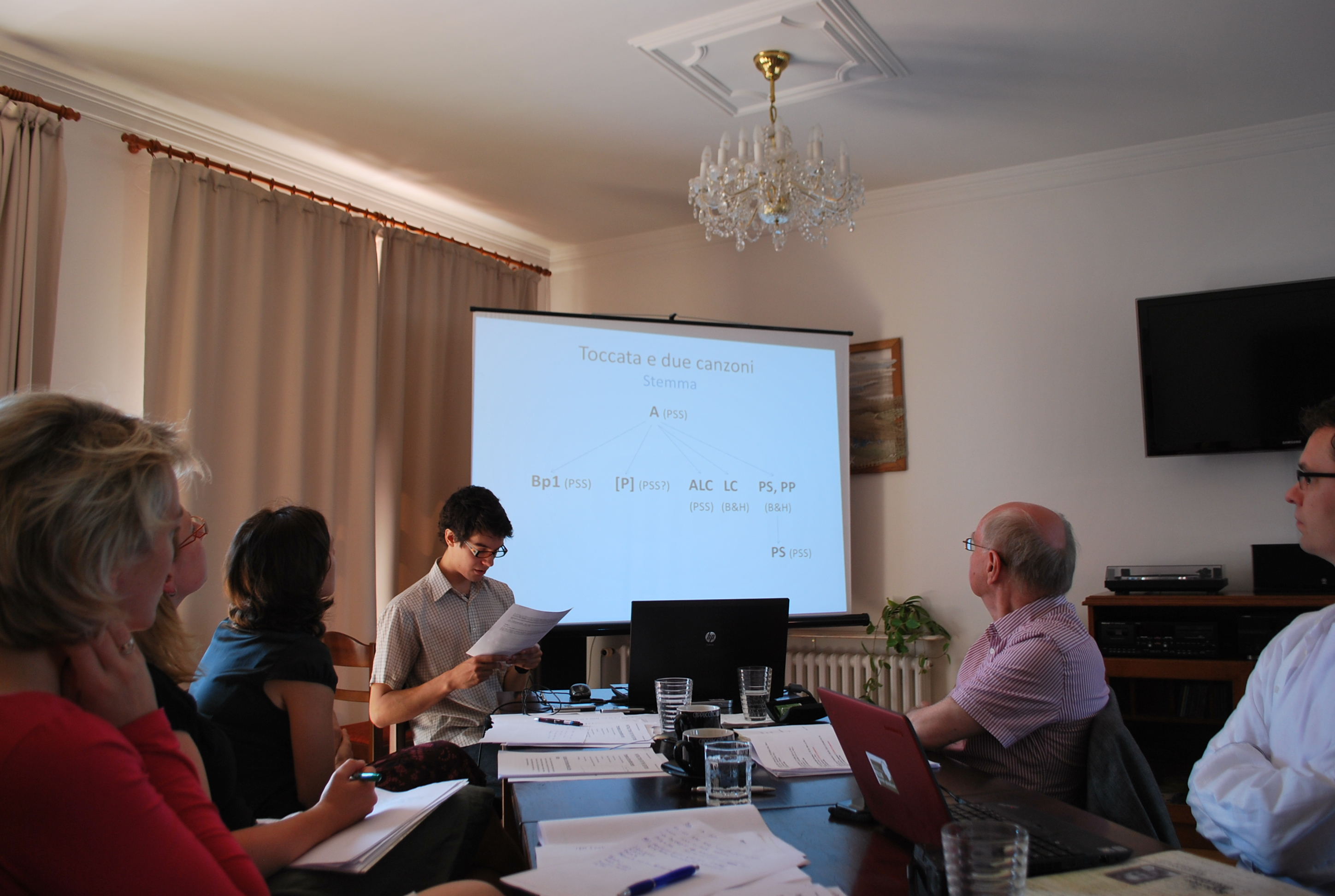
A meeting of the BMCE Editorial Board

The editorial board of the BMCE comprises leading experts – musicologists – from all over Europe, who have experience with the critical editions of other major composers:

- Prof. Dr. Peter Ackermann (Hochschule für Musik und Darstellende Kunst, Frankfurt am Main),
- Mgr. Aleš Březina, Ph.D. (Bohuslav Martinů Institute, Prague),
- Prof. PhDr. Jarmila Gabrielová, CSc. (Department of Musicology, Charles University, Prague),
- Mgr. Martin Ledvinka (Bohuslav Martinů Institute, Prague),
- PhDr. Kateřina Maýrová,
- Mgr. Kateřina Nová, Ph.D. (Bohuslav Martinů Institute, Prague),
- Mgr. Marek Pechač (Bohuslav Martinů Institute, Prague),
- Prof. Dr. Daniela Philippi (Gluck-Gesamtausgabe, Institut für Musikwissenschaft, Goethe-Universität, Frankfurt am Main),
- Prof. Dr. Ivana Rentsch (Institut für Historische Musikwissenschaft, Universität Hamburg),
- Prof. Dr. Giselher Schubert (Paul Hindemith-Institut, Frankfurt am Main),
- Prof. Dr. Arne Stollberg (Institut für Musikwissenschaft und Medienwissenschaft, Humboldt-Universität, Berlin),
- Dr. Paul Wingfield (Trinity College, Cambridge),
- Mgr. Jitka Zichová (Bohuslav Martinů Institute, Prague),
- Doc. MgA. Mgr. Vít Zouhar, Ph.D. (Faculty of Education, Palacký University, Olomouc),
- Mgr. Pavel Žůrek, Ph.D. (Bohuslav Martinů Institute, Prague)

The editorial board is headed by the presidium, which wields decisive authority; it is chaired by presidium, which wields decisive authority; it Aleš Březina], Director of the Bohuslav Martinů Institute.

The editorial board meets once a year at the Bohuslav Martinů Foundation in Prague. The work of individual editors is presented alongside new findings and research, and conceptual issues, potential changes, and adjustments to BMCE guidelines are discussed. The editorial board oversees the scholarly excellence of the edition and can decide about disputed issues.

== The groundwork – researching the primary sources of Bohuslav Martinů ==
As "the highest level of editorial work," a critical edition is to reflect all extant sources. Preparing the musical texts for publication involve studying and critically assessing the autograph of the work, manuscript copies, first prints, correspondence, and mentions in the press related to the performance materials to be able to reconstruct the composer’s intention. The editors use critical methods founded on historical research, semiotic analysis, and a thorough knowledge of the given style of music.

Bohuslav Martinů spent most of his life outside his homeland – in France, the United States of America, and Switzerland. This means that the sources are scattered throughout the world, stored in various institutions and private collections, with limited accessibility. Further complications are caused by language issues and publishing rights. The Bohuslav Martinů Institute endeavours to collect digital and physical copies of diverse sources both for the BMCE and for other researchers; these are compiled into a database of sources and made available to the academic community. Since its foundation in 1995, the Bohuslav Martinů Institute "has developed into an internationally recognised organisation that […] is an example and inspirational concept for other similar projects both at home and abroad."

== Publication schedule ==
Editorial work tends to be planned out decades ahead of time. For the sake of clarity, the composer’s complete works are categorised within the edition in the following manner:

=== Series overview ===
I. Stage works and film music (ca. 43 volumes)

1. Operas
2. Ballets
3. Incidental and film music

II. Orchestral music (ca. 16 volumes)

1. Symphonies
2. Works for large orchestra
3. Works for chamber orchestra or small orchestra
4. Suites and excerpts from stage works (adapted by the composer)

III. Concertos and other concertante works (ca. 17 volumes)

1. Concertos for solo instruments
2. Double, triple and quadruple concertos

IV. Chamber music (ca. 9 volumes)

1. Duos
2. Trios
3. Quartets
4. Quintets – nonets

V. Keyboard works (ca. 3 volumes)

1. Piano
2. Harpsichord, organ, two pianos

VI. Choral works and songs (ca. 8 volumes)

1. Choruses
2. Oratorios and cantatas
3. Songs, melodramas

VII. Supplements and varia (ca. 7 volumes)

1. Sketches, partial scores
2. Particelli of the non-realised works
3. Facsimiles

=== List of published and planned volumes ===
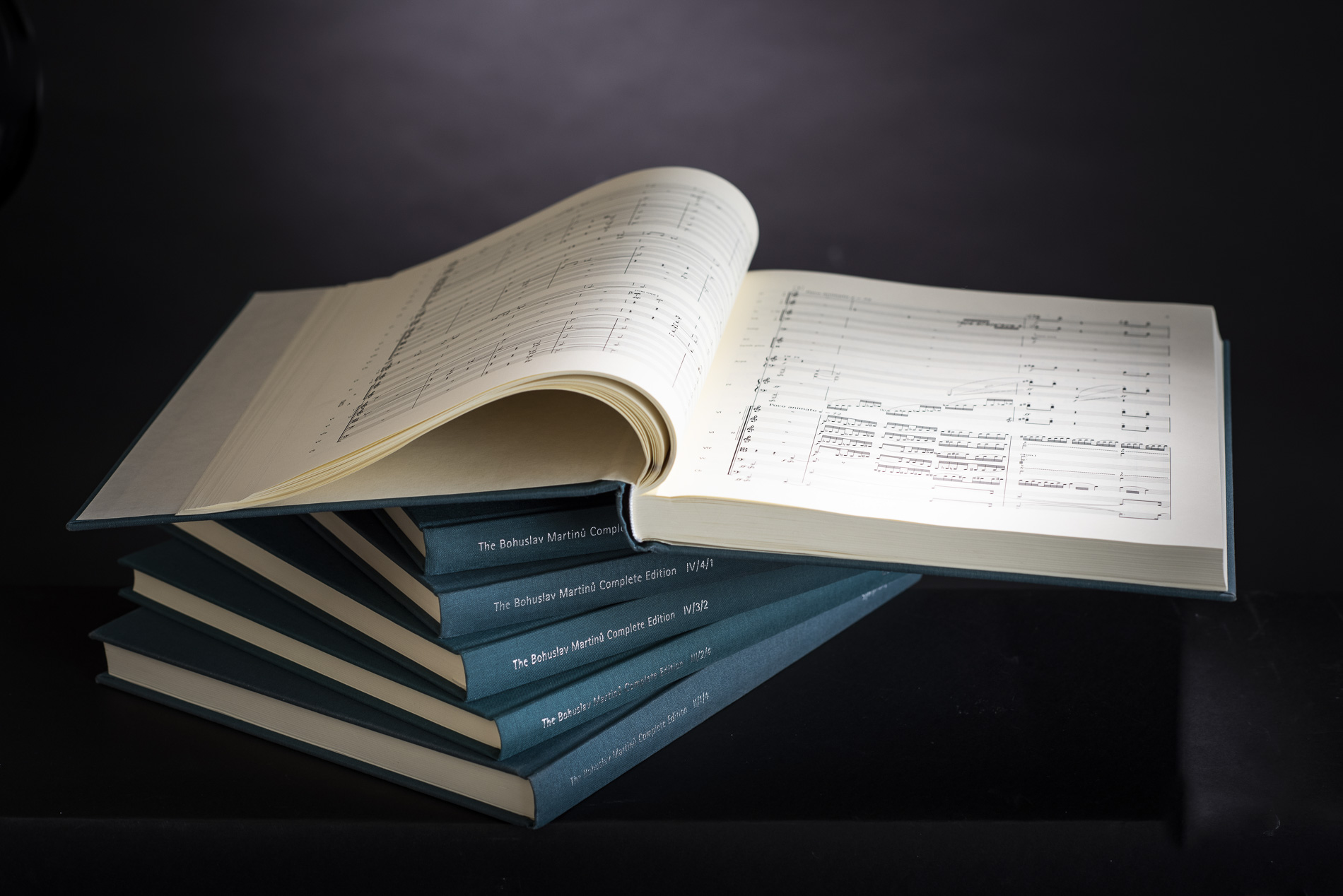
Bohuslav Martinů Complete Edition

==== First published volumes ====
The publication schedule takes into account the availability of sources and existing publishing rights to the works while striving to balance the content of individual volumes and editors’ capacity. Roughly 20 BMCE volumes are currently in preparation.

All of the previously published volumes include a detailed foreword (which presents current knowledge regarding the genesis of the work etc.) and a critical report in Czech and English, complemented by facsimile examples of the autograph and other sources and a list of sources. The edition is scheduled to have two volumes published each year, in linen binding sized 25.5 x 32.5 cm.

The very first published volume of the BMCE was the oratorio The Epic of Gilgamesh, H 351, edited by Aleš Březina, Director of the Bohuslav Martinů Institute. Its excellent editorial and scholarly quality and complexity (besides the score itself, the volume includes facsimiles of selected sources, excerpts from correspondence, a detailed foreword, and alternative readings) were acknowledged at the 2016 Frankfurt Music Fair by the German Association of Music Publisher’s (Deutscher Musikverleger-Verband) German Music Edition Prize for Best Edition of 2015. The jury singled it out among 74 publications from 18 German publishing houses. The high quality of the volume is also praised by Czech musicologist Jiří Zahrádka, who regards it as "an exemplary treatment for other works of this sort."

The same year also saw the publication of Martinů’s Symphony No. 4, H 303, which was edited by the British-based conductor Sharon Andrea Choa. Further assistance was provided by renowned Czech conductor Jiří Bělohlávek; the volume contains both the last authorised version of the work (with the pre-print amendments from 1948) and the original 1945 version of the symphony as it was recorded by Rafael Kubelík for Ultraphon. Both of the new scores were presented to the public at the music festival Smetana’s Litomyšl. Their launch ceremony was attended by Czech Minister of Culture Daniel Herman and Chief Conductor of the Czech Philharmonic Jiří Bělohlávek (who also performed Symphony No. 4 in its new critical version).

The third volume with chamber music for 6 to 9 instruments, edited by musicologist Jitka Zichová (Bohuslav Martinů Institute) in 2015, comprised Les Rondes, H 200, Serenade No. 1, H 217, Serenade No. 3, H 218, Stowe Pastorals, H 335, and Nonet No. 2, H 374. The volume was officially presented to the public at the Czech Museum of Music (National Museum) in October 2016 within the PKF – Prague Philharmonia concert series "Chamber Dialogues Across Centuries", which also premiered the critical edition of the compositions. "The compositions are written for unusual performing forces, but they share a high level of originality and artistic quality. For the first time ever, the works will be performed at a single concert, and from the new critical edition that is replacing old unsuitable editions from 50 years ago or more," Jitka Zichová commented on the occasion.

In 2016 the composer and music professor Vít Zouhar prepared Martinů’s four chamber cantatas Opening of the Springs, H 354, The Legend of the Smoke from Potato Tops, H 360, A Dandelion Romance, H 364, and Mikesh of the Mountains, H 375. This fourth volume of the BMCE was launched at the National Theatre in Brno in October 2017. The edition includes a meticulously prepared foreword, new findings on the genesis of the individual compositions, and a detailed description of the editing process. International ensembles might be hampered by the decision to underlay the notation with Czech lyrics only (translations are printed at the end of the volume).

The fifth achievement of the edition was the publication of four of Bohuslav Martinů’s eight string quartets – String Quartet No. 4, H 256, String Quartet No. 5, H 268, String Quartet No. 6, H 312, and String Quartet No. 7, H 314. The group of editors was headed by Aleš Březina; the volume, published in 2017, provides the composer’s last authorised versions of the quartets. Interested readers will also find a version free of the first-edition amendments and facsimiles of important documents and sketches.

The sixth volume of the edition by Christopher Hogwood (deceased), Marek Pechač, and Pavel Žůrek was published in 2018 and comprises Concerto for String Quartet and Orchestra, H 207, and Sinfonia Concertante, H 322.

The year 2019 was particularly rich in terms of published volumes. Paul Wingfield of Trinity College delivered to the publisher volume No. 7 with Field Mass, H 279, and The Spectre’s Bride, H 214 I A. The subsequent volume No. 8 with Concerto da Camera for violin, string orchestra, piano and percussion, H 285, and Rhapsody-Concerto for viola and orchestra, H 337, edited by Sandra Bergmannová, Aleš Březina, Paul Silverthorne, Jitka Zichová and Pavel Žůrek was released in summer 2019. The ninth volume, also published in 2019, consists of two piano concertos - Incantation. Concerto for Piano and Orchestra No. 4, H 358 and Concerto for Piano and Orchestra No. 5 (Fantasia concertante), both edited by pianist and musicologist Ivana Tabak.

Following volume No. 10 introduced critical edition of Martinů's opera Ariadna, composed in 1958. This volume was edited by Robert Simon and completed in 2021.

In 2023, BMCE presented two volumes (No. 11 and 12): symphonic pieces The Frescoes of Piero della Francesca and The Parables were edited by Janina Müller and Arne Stollberg and released in 2023. Volume No. 12 was dedicated to the one-act opera Alexandre bis, H 255, the first scholarly critical edition of the opera that was never performed and published during the life of Martinů, edited by Jitka Zichová.

=== Overview of the first ten volumes ===
- Series VI / 2, The Epic of Gilgamesh, H 351, Ed. Aleš Březina, BA 10571, 2014,
- Series II / 1, Symphony No. 4, H 305, Ed. Sharon Andrea Choa, BA 10572, 2014,
- Series IV / 4, Les Rondes, H 200, Serenade No. 1, H 217, Serenade No. 3, H 218, Stowe Pastorals, H 335, Nonet No. 2, H 374, Ed. Jitka Zichová, BA 10574, 2015,
- Series VI / 2, Opening of the Springs, H 354, The Legend of the Smoke from Potato Tops, H 360, A Dandelion Romance, H 364, Mikesh of the Mountains, H 375, Ed. Vít Zouhar, BA 10575, 2016,
- Series IV / 3, String Quartet No. 4, H 256, String Quartet No. 5, H 268, String Quartet No. 6, H 312, String Quartet No. 7, H 314, Eds. Aleš Březina et al., BA 10576, 2017,
- Series III / 2 Concerto for String Quartet and Orchestra, H 207, Sinfonia concertante, H 322, Eds. Christopher Hogwood†, Marek Pechač, Pavel Žůrek, BA 10577, 2018,
- Series VI / 2, Field mass, H 279, The Spectre’s Bride, H 214 I A, Ed. Paul Wingfield, BA 10573, 2019,
- Series III / 1, Concerto da camera for violin and string orchestra with piano and percussion, H 285, Rhapsody-Concerto for viola and orchestra [, H 337, Eds. Sandra Bergmannová, Aleš Březina, Paul Silverthorne, Jitka Zichová, Pavel Žůrek, BA 10578, 2019
- Series III / 1, Incantation. Concerto for Piano and Orchestra No. 4, H 358, Concerto for Piano and Orchestra No. 5 (Fantasia concertante), H 366, Ed. Ivana Tabak, BA 10579, 2019,
- Series I / 1, Ariane, H 370, Ed. R. Simon, BA 10580, 2021,
- Series II / 2 / 7, The Frescoes of Piero della Francesca, H 352, The Parables, H 367, Eds. Janina Müller, Arne Stollberg, BA 10582–01, 2023,
- Series I / 1 / 8, Alexandre bis, H 255, Ed. Jitka Zichová, BA 10586–01, 2023
- Series I / 1, Mariken de Nimègue, H 236 2/I, Ed. Pavel Žůrek, BA 10587–01, ISMN 979-0-2601-0986-5, 2024

== Sources ==
- Březina, Aleš (2004). "Editionsrichtlinien der Bohuslav Martinů-Gesamtausgabe". Hudební věda. 41 (3–4): 411–432.
- Halbreich, Harry (2007). Bohuslav Martinů: Werkverzeichnis und Biografie (2 ed.). Mainz: Schott.
- Flamm, Christoph (2017). "Bohuslav Martinů: Gesamtausgabe". Musikforschung (4): 36.
- Kašpárek, Ludvík (2016). "Křest 4. svazku Souborného vydání díla Bohuslava Martinů". Hudební rozhledy. 69 (12): 18.
- Martinů, Bohuslav a Březina, Aleš, ed. The Epic of Gilgamesh, H 351 = Epos o Gilgamešovi, H 351 [score]. Prague: Bärenreiter Praha, 2014.
- Martinů, Bohuslav a Choa, Sharon Andrea, ed. Symphony No. 4, H 305 = Symfonie č. 4, H 305 [score]. Prague: Bärenreiter Praha, 2014.
- Martinů, Bohuslav a Zichová, Jitka, ed. Les Rondes, H 200; Serenáda č. 1, H 217; Serenáda č. 3, H 218; Stowe Pastorals, H 335; Nonet č. 2, H 374 [score]. Prague: Bärenreiter Praha, 2015.
- Martinů, Bohuslav a Zouhar, Vít, ed. Opening of the springs, H 354; The legend of the smoke from potato tops, H 360; A dandelion romance, H 364; Mikesh from the mountains, H 375 = Otvírání studánek, H 354; Legenda z dýmu bramborové nati, H 360; Romance z pampelišek, H 364; Mikeš z hor, H 375 [score]. Prague: Bärenreiter Praha, 2016.
- Martinů, Bohuslav a Březina, Aleš, ed. String quartet no. 4, H 256; String quartet no. 5, H 268; String quartet no. 6, H 312; Concerto da camera (String quartet no. 7), H 314 = Smyčcový kvartet č. 4, H 256; Smyčcový kvartet č. 5, H 268; Smyčcový kvartet č. 6, H 312; Concerto da camera (Smyčcový kvartet č. 7), H 314 [score]. Kassel: Bärenreiter, 2017.
- Mihule, Jaroslav (1974). Bohuslav Martinů: profil života a díla (1 ed.). Prague: Editio Supraphon.
- Pirner, Jan (2017). "Bohuslav Martinů: Epos o Gilgamešovi, H 351 (Souborné vydání díla Bohuslava Martinů VI/2/1), ed. Aleš Březina, Praha 2014". Hudební věda. 54 (2): 224–227.
- Schlüren, Christoph (2017). "Das Konstruktive und das Fantastische". Neue Musikzeitung (12).
- Simeone, Nigel (Fall 2016). "The First Volumes in The Complete Martinů Edition". Notes. 73 (1): 166–170.
- Simon, Robert C. (2014). Bohuslav Martinů: Research and Information Guide. New York: Routledge.
- Šafránek, Miloš (1961). Bohuslav Martinů: život a dílo (1 ed.). Prague: Státní hudební vydavatelství.
- Šmídová, Ludmila (2017). "Bohuslav Martinů: Symfonie č. 4, H 305 (Souborné vydání díla Bohuslava Martinů II/1/4), ed. Sharon Andrea Choa, Praha 2014". Hudební věda. 54 (2): 227–230.
- Velická, Eva; Bergmannová, Sandra; Berná, Lucie (2008). Rukověť hudebního editora. Prague: Editio Bärenreiter Praha.
- Zahrádka, Jiří (2018). "Souborné vydání díla Bohuslava Martinů". Opus musicum. 50 (3): 106–108.
