= The Opening of the Wells =

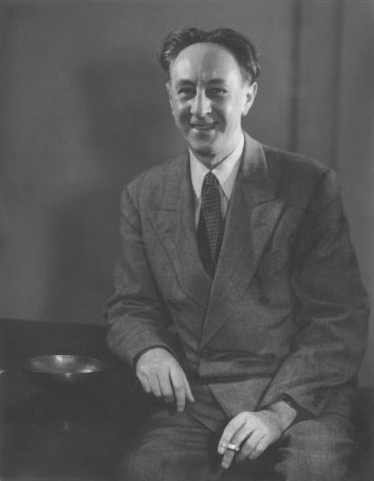
Bohuslav Martinů in 1945

The Opening of the Wells (Czech: Otvírání studánek; also known as The Opening of the Springs), H. 354 (1955) is a chamber cantata by the Czech composer Bohuslav Martinů.

It was composed in June and July 1955 in Nice, France to the text of the Czech poet Miroslav Bureš. It was written for female chorus, soprano, alto and baritone solos, reciter, two violins, viola and piano. The composition was dedicated to "Miroslav Bureš and our Moravian Highlands". The composition is a part of the four-part cycle of cantatas (The Opening of the Wells, Legend of the Smoke from Potato Fires, The Romance of the Dandelions, Mikeš of the Mountains); all are connected with the Moravian Highlands, Martinů's native region.

The cantata relates to the customs around welcoming spring, and the cleansing of springs of detritus at the end of winter. The baritone sings as a pilgrim returning to his native land.

== Recordings ==
- Opening of the Wells, Legend of the Smoke from Potato Fires, Mikeš of the Mountains. CD. Supraphon 110767-2231.

== Bohuslav Martinů Complete Edition ==
The Opening of the Springs, edited by Vít Zouhar, was published by Bärenreiter in the Bohuslav Martinů Complete Edition volume "Cantatas on Texts by Miloslav Bureš" in 2016.
