= Triangle (musical instrument) =

Percussion instrument

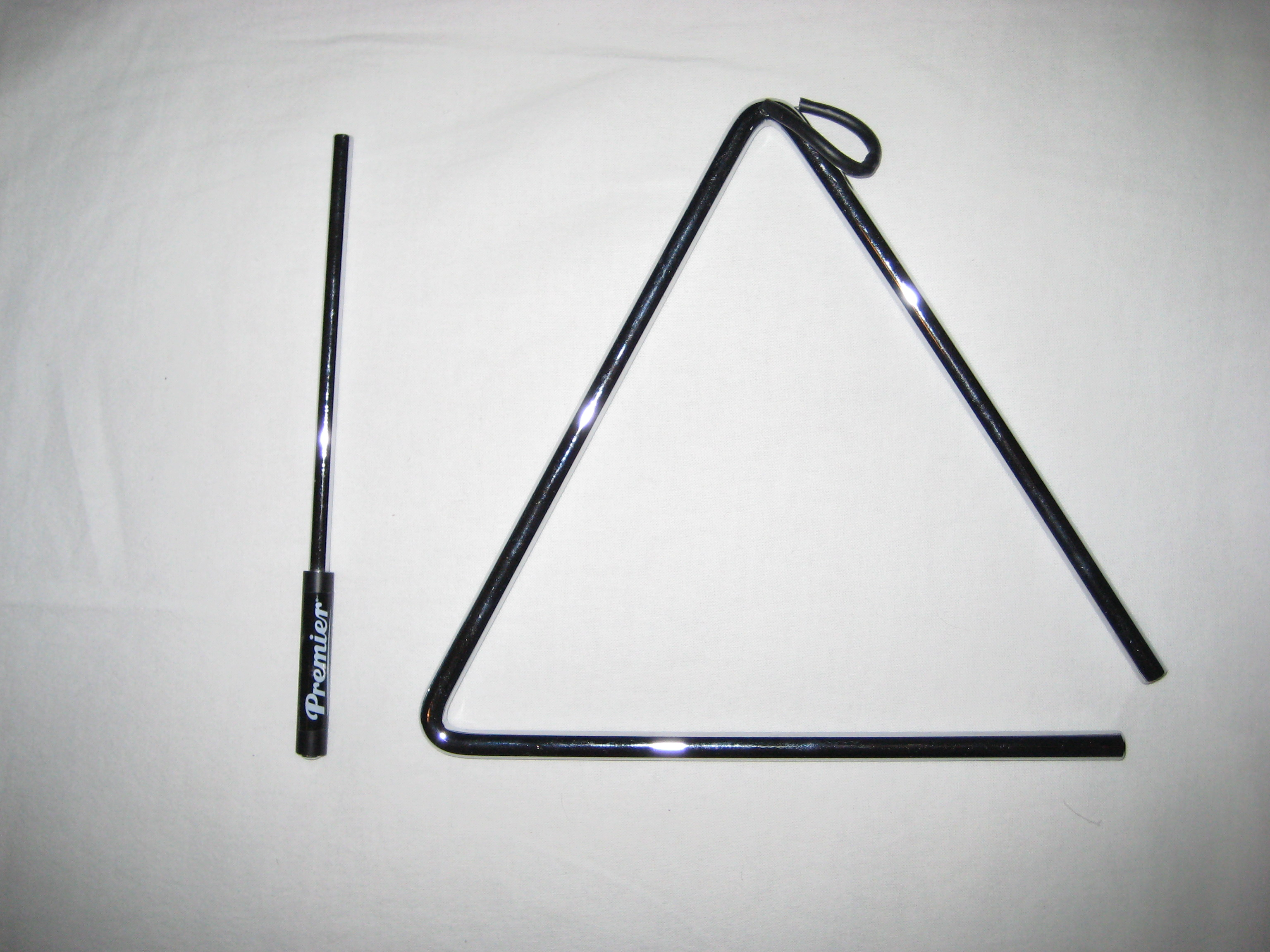

Percussion instrument
- Classification: Hand percussion, idiophone
- Hornbostel–Sachs classification: 111.211 Individual percussion sticks

The triangle, or musical triangle, is a musical instrument in the percussion family, classified as an idiophone in the Hornbostel-Sachs classification system. Triangles are made from a variety of metals including aluminum, beryllium copper, brass, bronze, iron, and steel. The metal is bent into a triangular shape with one open end. The instrument is usually held by a loop of some form of thread or wire at the top curve to enable the triangle to vibrate, and it is struck with a metal rod called a "beater". The triangle theoretically has indefinite pitch, and produces a plurality of overtones when struck with an appropriate beater.

== History ==
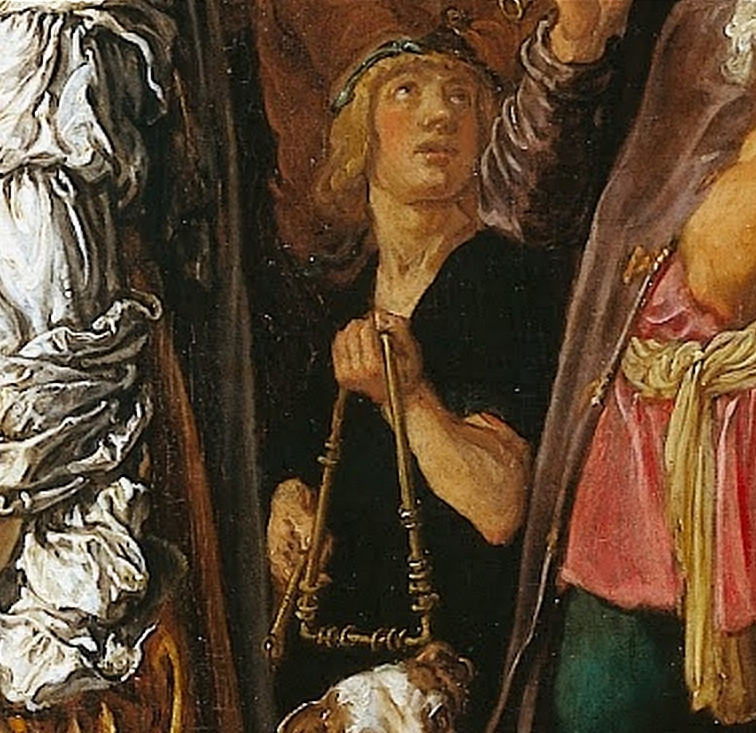
A 1614 painting by Pieter Lastman depicts a musical triangle.

Iconography is the primary source for knowledge of the history of the triangle, and provides insight into the musical and social context in which the instrument developed. Some scholars believe the triangle to be a direct descendant of the ancient Egyptian sistrum. Others do not go quite so far, referring to the triangle as being "allied" with the sistrum throughout history, but not a direct descendant. Like the sistrum, the triangle, as seen in iconography, has its origins in religious settings. The triangle is used as a liturgical instrument in the rites of the Coptic Church based in Egypt and the Syro-Malabar Church based in Kerala, India.

For decades, it was thought that the first iconographic witness of a triangle came from a 9th-century manuscript held at Emmeram of Regensburg, through longstanding writings by James Blades and others, although recent scholarship does not share this view. In the 14th century, early depictions of the triangle emerge from Western Christian iconography. From that time forward, the triangle is seen in iconography through the centuries, in a variety of sizes, and sometimes having jingling rings hanging from its rungs. Triangles are depicted as having an open corner with the ends not touching, and also as having with fully closed corners; the sides are sometimes slightly curved. Triangles are also in shapes that are not quite triangular, such as trapezoids and stirrup shapes. The first known use of the written term "triangle" occurs in an inventory list of the musical instruments owned by the kapelle in Wurttemberg, Germany. The list was compiled by Balduin Hoyoul in 1589, over two hundred years after the iconographic emergence of the triangle in the fourteenth century.

Around the eighteenth century, the use of the triangle began to expand; its sound started to bring about new musical connotations and associations. Influenced by ambassadorship, diplomacy, "Turquerie" and the new sounds of their own military bands, European operatic and orchestral composers began to incorporate the triangle as a means of emulating the sounds of the mehterân—the metallic sounds of the zil and cevgen, combined with the rhythmic pulse of the kös, davul, and nakkare. The early use of the triangle in an operatic/orchestral setting was often not notated, and simply performed by ear. When a triangle part was notated, it was in steady, repetitive figures providing a march-like character. The triangle was the available instrument in Europe for composers to write rhythmically, and with a metallic color. However, the triangle was not used in functional mehter music, nor was it used by Janissaries or mehteran while providing music for battle. In the early nineteenth century, Romantic-era composers began to seek new colors, and explored the sustaining qualities of the triangle. Preference was given towards a long, sustaining sound that only triangles without rings could provide. Thus, the jingling rings associated with the triangle for five centuries prior, fell out of use.

== Shaping and manufacturing ==
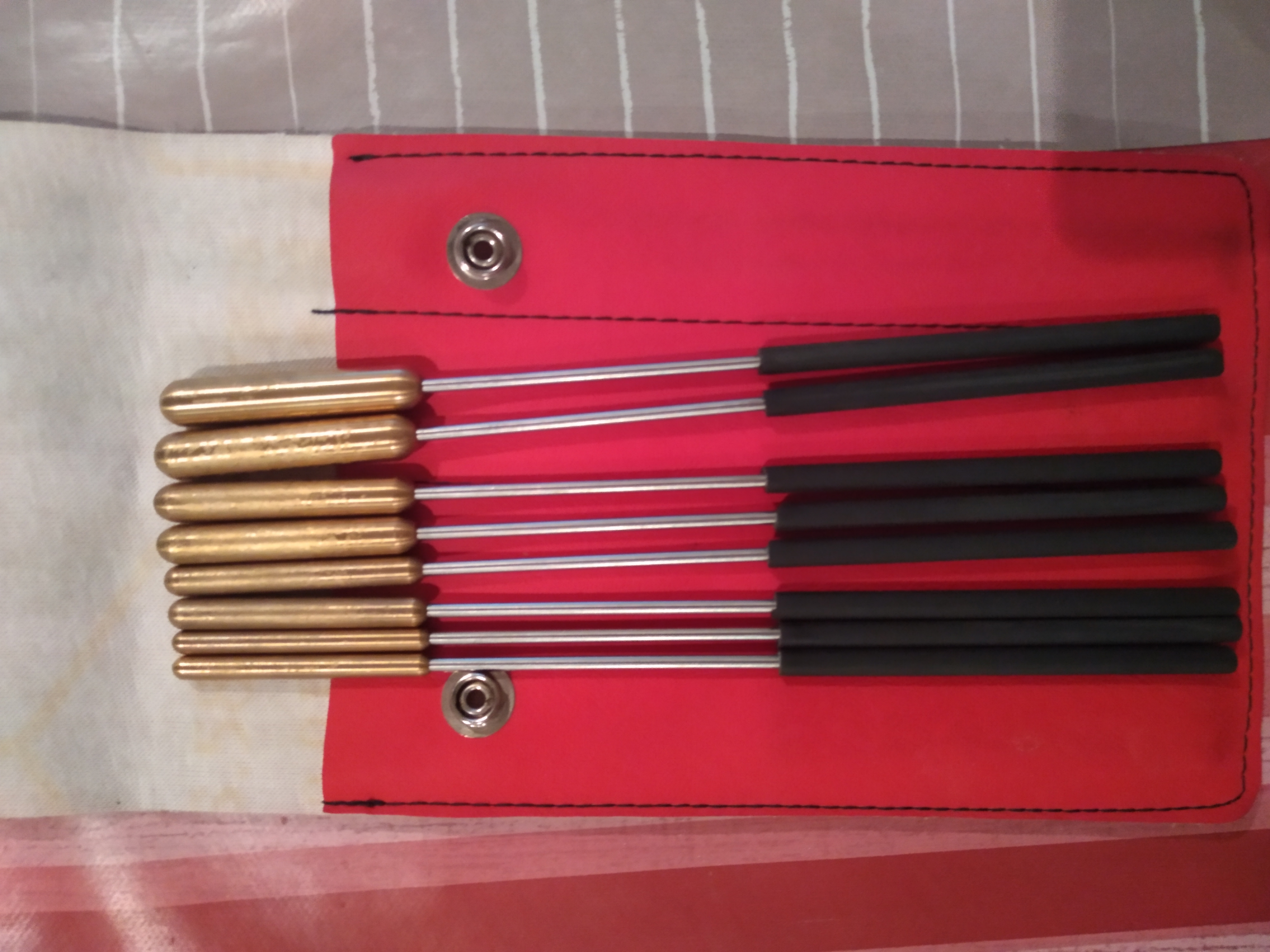
The triangle is struck with a metal rod called a "beater". Pictured are Chaklin brand metal beaters.

The modern triangle is eponymously named after the triangle, though one of the angles is left open with the ends of the bar not quite touching. This opening is used to keep the instrument from having a definite pitch, creating many rich overtones. It is generally suspended from one of the other corners, commonly by a piece of nylon fishing line, leaving it free to vibrate. Early examples of triangles include ornamental work at the open end, often in a scroll pattern. In modern times, the scroll pattern has been abandoned and triangles are made from either steel or brass.

== Technique ==
The triangle is often the subject of jokes and one-liners, as an archetypal instrument that seemingly has no musical function and requires no skill to play (the Martin Short character Ed Grimley is an example). However, triangle parts in classical music can be very demanding, and James Blades in the Grove Dictionary of Music and Musicians writes that "the triangle is by no means a simple instrument to play".

The triangle is typically suspended from a triangle clip that suspends the triangle so that it is free to vibrate. When the instrument is played with one beater, the hand that holds the triangle clip can also be used to damp or slightly modify the sound. The triangle is usually struck with a metal beater, giving a high-pitched, ringing tone. For complex, rapid rhythms, the instrument may be suspended from a stand using two clips, and played with two beaters, although this makes it more difficult to control. Most difficulties in playing the triangle come from the complex rhythms which are sometimes written for it, and it can also be quite difficult to control the level of volume. Very quiet notes can be obtained by using a much lighter beater; knitting needles are sometimes used as well. Composers sometimes call for wooden beaters to be used instead of a metal one, producing a unique tone. A triangle roll, similar to a snare roll, is notated with three lines through the stem of the note. It requires the player to quickly move the beater back and forth in either the upper or lower corner, moving the beater quickly between the two sides.

== Musical styles ==
=== Classical music ===
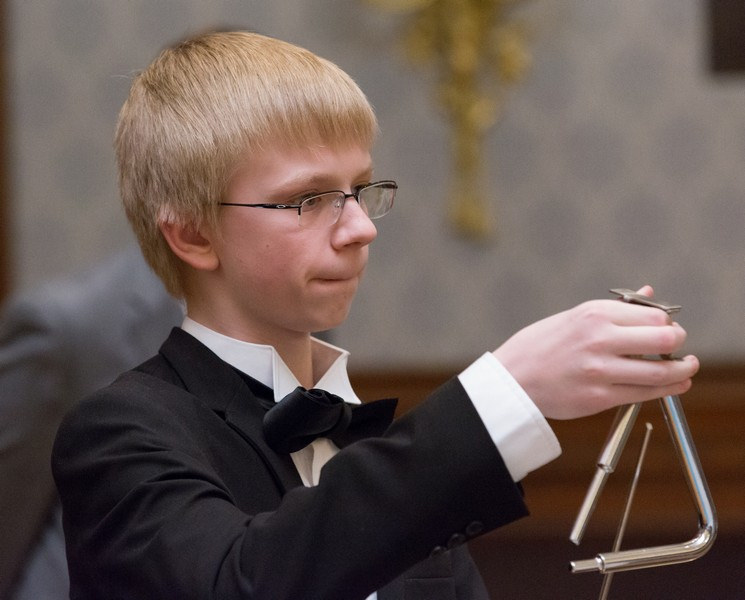
A young orchestral musician plays an Alan Abel triangle.

In European classical music, the triangle has been used in the western classical orchestra since around the middle of the 18th century. Wolfgang Amadeus Mozart, Joseph Haydn and Ludwig van Beethoven all used it, though sparingly, usually in imitation of Janissary bands. The earliest writing for the triangle is found in Cristoph Willibald Gluck's operas Der betrogene Kadi (1761) and La Cythère Assiégée (1775). The first piece to use the triangle prominently was Franz Liszt's Piano Concerto No. 1 in E♭ major, where it is used as a solo instrument in the third movement, giving this concerto the nickname of "triangle concerto". In Romantic era music, the triangle was used in some music by Richard Wagner, such as the "Bridal Chorus" from Lohengrin. Johannes Brahms uses the triangle to a particular effect in the third movement of his Fourth Symphony, the only appearance of non-timpani percussion in a Brahms symphony. Albert Lortzing used triangles in the opening of his opera Der Waffenschmied to mimic the sound of hammers in a blacksmith's shop.

=== Folk and popular music ===
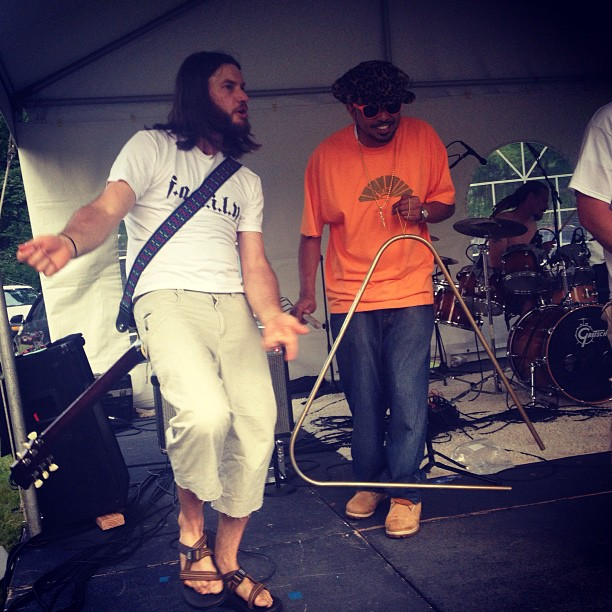
A percussionist in a popular music group plays a large, low-pitched bass triangle.

Latin style triangle
A triangle played Latin style, opening and closing the hand for rhythmic effect.

In folk music, forró, Cajun music and rock music, a triangle is often held directly in the hand so that one side can be damped by the fingers to vary the tone. The sound can also be changed slightly by varying the area struck, and by subtle damping.

The triangle (known in Cajun French as a 'tit-fer, from petit fer, "little iron") is popular in Cajun music where it serves as the strong beat, especially if no drums are present.

In the Brazilian music style forró, it is used together with the zabumba (a larger drum) and an accordion. It forms together with the zabumba the rhythmic section. It provides usually an ongoing pulse, damping the tone on the first second and fourth while opening the hand on the third beat to let most frequencies sound. It can be used extensively for breaks, to improvise, and to vary the rhythm.

In Indonesian folk music such as gandrung, it is used together with gamelan. It is locally called kluncing in the Osing language.
