= Symphony No. 4 (Martinů) =

- by Bohuslav Martinů
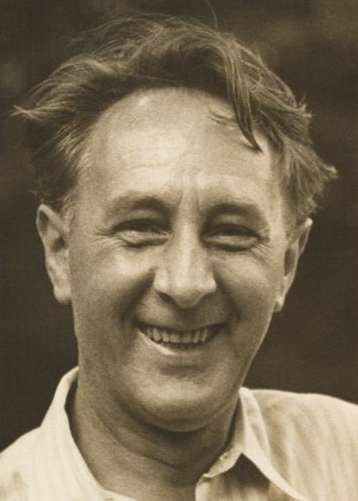
- Martinů c. 1942
- Catalogue: H. 305
- Composed: 1945
- Dedication: Helen and William Ziegler

Premiere
- Date: 30 November 1945
- Location: Academy of Music in Philadelphia
- Conductor: Eugene Ormandy
- Performers: Philadelphia Orchestra

The Symphony No. 4, H. 305, by Bohuslav Martinů was composed in New York City from April 1945, and completed at Martinů's summer home at Cape Cod in June 1945. The finale bears the inscription South Orleans, 14th June, 1945.

The work is in four movements and, according to the composer, grows out of a single motif. The first movement alternates between lyrical and rhythmical material presented in variation. The second movement, in 6/8 time is a scherzo, marked by a rhythmically irregular Dvořákian leading melody. The slow third movement is dominated by the strings with short passagework for the woodwind. The finale is an energetic reworking of earlier material and concludes with a vibrant tutti.

The work is dedicated to his friends Helen and William Ziegler, and was premiered on 30 November 1945 at the Academy of Music in Philadelphia by the Philadelphia Orchestra under Eugene Ormandy.

== Music ==
The Fourth Symphony is scored for three flutes, piccolo, three oboes, cor anglais, three clarinets, two bassoons, four horns, three trumpets, three trombones, tuba, timpani, percussion (triangle, wood block, tambourine, side drum, bass drum, cymbals, tam-tam), piano, and strings.

The symphony has four movements:

1. Poco moderato
2. Scherzo. Allegro vivo. Trio. Moderato
3. Largo
4. Poco allegro

== Selected discography ==
Martinů's Fourth Symphony is found amongst the earliest extant recordings of Martinů symphonies in archival holdings. The earliest is Eugene Ormandy's recording of the Second Symphony with the Philadelphia Orchestra, made on 20 January 1945. The Fourth Symphony followed soon after, with aircheck recordings on 78 rpm discs of a broadcast by the Rochester Philharmonic Orchestra conducted by Erich Leinsdorf, on WNBC (New York), 27 March 1948. Neither of these recordings has ever been released commercially. Rafael Kubelik recorded the Fourth Symphony for the radio on 10 June 1948, and this recording was eventually given commercial release in 2012.

- Czech Philharmonic — Rafael Kubelik. Supraphon, recorded 10 June 1948 (first issued 2012)
- Czech Philharmonic — Martin Turnovský. Supraphon, 1967
- Czech Philharmonic — Wolfgang Sawallisch. Supraphon 1977 (released 2013)
- Czech Philharmonic — Václav Neumann. Supraphon, 1978
- Royal Liverpool Philharmonic Orchestra — Walter Weller. EMI, 1980
- Bamberg Symphony — Neeme Järvi. BIS, 1987
- Scottish National Orchestra — Bryden Thomson. Chandos CHAN 8917, recorded 6 & 7 September 1989
- Ukrainian National Symphony — Arthur Fagen. Naxos, 2001
- Prague Radio Symphony Orchestra – Vladimír Válek, cond. Bohuslav Martinů: Symphonies Nos. 1–6. Recorded Prague, Czech Radio, Studio A, 2006. 3-CD set. Supraphon SU 3940. Prague: Supraphon, 2008.
- BBC Symphony — Jiří Bělohlávek. Onyx, 2011
- Frankfurt Symphony Orchestra https://www.youtube.com/watch?v=laI5pnq5X7g 2017

== Bohuslav Martinů Complete Edition ==
In 2015, Sharon Andrea Choa's critical edition of the Symphony No. 4 was published by Bärenreiter within the Bohuslav Martinů Complete Edition.
