= The Epic of Gilgamesh (Martinů) =

Oratorio by Bohuslav Martinů

The Epic of Gilgamesh (Czech: Epos o Gilgamešovi) is an oratorio for solo voices, chorus and orchestra by Bohuslav Martinů composed in 1954–1955 near Nice in France, and premiered in 1958 in Basel, Switzerland, with a title and text in German, as Das Gilgamesch-Epos.

== Background ==
Title page of The epic of Gilgamish by R. Campbell Thompson, 1928

Maja Sacher visited the British Museum and brought back to Switzerland the booklet about the clay cuneiform tablets concerning Gilgamesh she had seen. Martinů was very much taken with the subject (he had in 1919 created a work based on another Babylonian theme, Istar) and in September 1948 he urged his friend Sacher to obtain a complete translation; this was one by the archaeologist Reginald Campbell Thompson. However, Martinů wrote his text in English, based on the translation in hexameters by Campbell Thompson, The Epic of Gilgamish (1928), in his own style, choosing freely what would suit his music best. Martinů would have preferred to compose it to a text in Czech and, according to his biographer Miloš Šafránek, he regretted hearing too late about the recent Czech translation of the epic by poet Lubor Matouš. Later, Ferdinand Pujman translated Martinů's text on the basis of Matouš' work for what became Epos o Gilgamešovi. The composer began work around Christmas in 1954 and finished on 18 February 1955, keeping in close contact with the Sachers the whole time.

The text comprises a sectional portrait of the original Epic of Gilgamesh in three parts. They are entitled 'Gilgamesh', 'The Death of Enkidu', and 'Evocation' where Gilgamesh summons Enkidu from the world of the dead. Parts of the text are transplanted – for instance the first section contains elements of the Third Tablet and the final section comes from the Tenth Tablet.

== Synopsis ==
- Part 1, "Gilgamesh": The people describe the horrors of their ruler and ask Aruru to create a companion for Gilgamesh so that he may be distracted; Aruru creates Enkidu; Gilgamesh learns about the hunter and has him brought under his influence through a sexual seduction; Enkidu accepts the woman's approaches and goes into the city; Enkidu's herd no longer wants to be with him and flees; Gilgamesh and Enkidu fight each other.
- Part 2, "Death of Enkidu": The fight in the past, they become friends; but Enkidu falls ill and dreams that he will die; which he does, after twelve days of pain. Gilgamesh cries for him; he seeks eternal life, but cannot find it.
- Part 3, "The Incantation": Gilgamesh comes to realize that he has not been able to learn the mystery of immortality; Enkidu has to come to life again by an incantation and tell him; in a conversation with his spirit, all that is heard are the words: "I saw".

This is an example of comparative text; Campbell Thompson and Martinů:

R. Campbell Thompson (1928)	Bohuslav Martinů (1954)
So when the goddess Aruru heard this, in her mind she imagined / Straightaway this concept of Anu, and, washing her hands, the Aruru / Finger'd some clay, on the desert she moulded it: thus on the desert / Enkidu made she, a warrior, as he were born and begotten / Yea, of Ninurta the double, and put forth the whole of a fillet; / Sprouted luxuriant growth of his hair – like the awns of the barley, / Nor knew he people nor land; he was clad in a garb like Sumuquan. / E'en with gazelles did he pasture on herbage, along with the cattle / drank he his fill, with the beasts did his heart delight at the water.	Bass solo: To th'appeal of their wailing Goddess Aruru gave ear. / She finger'd some clay, on the desert she moulded it. / Thus on the desert Enkidu made she, a warrior. / In the way of a woman he snooded his locks, / sprouted luxuriant growth of his hair like the awns of the barley.
Chorus: Nor knew he people nor land. / With the gazelles did he pasture on herbage. / Along with the beast did his heart delight at the water, / with the cattle.

== Performance history ==
The premiere of the oratorio took place on 24 January 1958 with the Basel Chamber Orchestra and the Basel Chamber Choir conducted by Paul Sacher, and it received further performances in Martinů's lifetime, including one in Vienna where the soloists were Marilyn Horne, Murray Dickie, Otto Wiener and Walter Berry, conducted by Sacher. The United Kingdom premiere in 1959 was conducted by Sir Malcolm Sargent, who had been very impressed with it on hearing during a visit to Prague; Alvar Liddell was the narrator, and it was recorded. Vernon Handley conducted the work in Guildford in 1970. Having made a studio recording for Supraphon in 1976, Jiří Bělohlávek conducted a performance in the Festival Hall with the BBC Symphony Orchestra and Jack Shepherd as narrator in 1995, issued on CD by the BBC.

A staged version of the work was presented for the first time by the Brno National Theatre in April 2019 produced by Jiří Heřman, with choreography by Marko Ivanović, with Jiří Brückler in the title role, coupled with Dido and Aeneas.

In 2014, Aleš Březina's critical edition of the Epic of Gilgamesh was published by Bärenreiter within the Bohuslav Martinů Complete Edition.

Subsequent operas on the subject have been Gilgamesh by Per Nørgård (1972) and an opera by Volker David Kirchner (2000), among others.
