= La Cythère assiégée =

Opera by Christoph Willibald Gluck

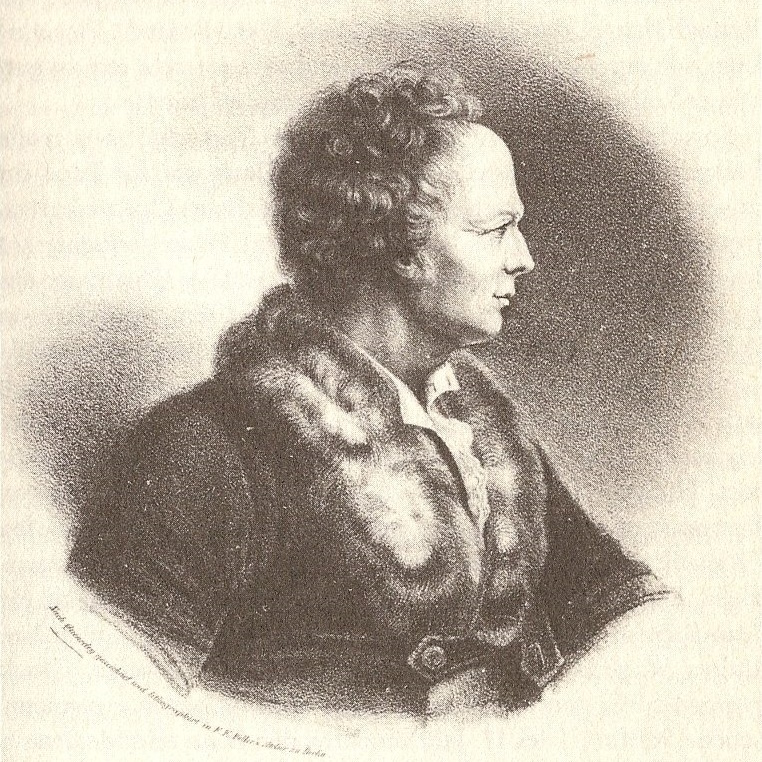
Portrait of Christoph Willibald Gluck, ca. 1750

La Cythère assiégée (Cythera Besieged) is an opera by the composer Christoph Willibald Gluck. The French-language libretto is by Charles-Simon Favart. The first version of this opera premiered in spring 1759 at the Burgtheater, Vienna in the form of a one-act opéra comique. A completely revised version turned it into a three-act opéra-ballet which appeared at the Paris Opéra on 1 August 1775.

Gluck resorted to his eponymous opera comique (Vienna 1759) for the Parisian Cythère assiégée (1775) and transformed it into an opera ballet. He added recitative sections to Favarts's textual basis, re-designed sections and added his own compositions, some of them changing. His compositional works had progressed so far to the beginning of March 1775 that Gluck was able to leave a copy of the score on his departure from Paris; but neither could he supervise the rehearsal work nor be present at the premiere on 1 August 1775 or in the other 21 performances. Due to these circumstances, three versions of the work can be distinguished: the original, the listed and the printed.

== Sources ==
- Holden, Amanda The Viking Opera Guide (Viking, 1993), p. 374.
- Christoph Willibald Gluck: Cythère assiégée. Opéra-ballet in three acts (Paris 1775), edited by Daniela Philippi. In Christoph Willibald Gluck. Sämtliche Werke, Part IV: Französische komische Opern, Volume 9. Bärenreiter, Kassel 2019.
