= Ivana Rentsch =

Swiss musicologist

Ivana Rentsch (born in 1974) is a Swiss musicologist and teacher at the University of Hamburg.

== Life ==
Born in Olten, Rentsch studied musicology, media and linguistics at the University of Zürich. From 2000, she spent five years as a research assistant at the Musicological Institute of the University of Bern. In 2004 she received her doctorate with her thesis on Bohuslav Martinů's operas of the interwar period. In 2005 she was granted a research scholarship at the Austrian universities of Graz and Salzburg for the project Dance in Score (Swiss National Science Foundation).

From 2006 to 2013 Rentsch was assistant at the Musicological Institute of the University of Zurich. She habilitated there in 2010 with her study on the significance of dance for instrumental music and music theory of the early modern period. At the same time, she held teaching positions at the universities of Basel, Bern, Fribourg and Graz. Since 2013 Rentsch has been professor for historical musicology at the University of Hamburg.

Rentsch is married to the musicologist Arne Stollberg.

== Focus of research and publications ==
Rentsch is co-editor of the journal Die Musikforschung and member of the scientific advisory board of both Bohuslav Martinů Complete Edition (Bohuslav Martinů Stiftung Prag, Bärenreiter-Verlag), as well as that of the Recherche sur la musique française XVIIe-XVIIIe siècles. Nouvelle série and the journal Musicologica slovaca (Slovak Academy of Sciences).

== Publications ==
- Anklänge an die Avantgarde : Bohuslav Martinůs Opern der Zwischenkriegszeit(Beihefte zum Archiv für Musikwissenschaft, vol. 61), Stuttgart : Steiner, 2007.
- Die Poesie der Oper. Bohuslav Martinus Theaterästhetik als Gegenentwurf zum Musikdrama, Sonderband Bohuslav Martinu. Musik-Konzepte. Neue Folge. Edited by Ulrich Tadday, 2009, ISBN 978-3-86916-017-7
