= Matthias Schmidt (musicologist) =

German musicologist

Matthias Schmidt (born 1966) is a German musicologist.

== Career ==
Born in Cologne, Schmidt studied musicology, Germanistic, history of art and philosophy in the universities of Bonn, Berlin and Vienna. He received his doctorate at the FU Berlin and habilitated at the University of Salzburg. Schmidt was a research assistant at the Arnold Schönberg-Institute of the University of Music and Performing Arts Vienna, the German Academic Exchange Service, and the Österreichische Forschungsgemeinschaft scholarships in Austria, Italy and several times in the USA. Schmidt has spent many years of teaching (as lecturer, substitute and visiting professor) at universities in Austria, Switzerland, Germany and the Netherlands in addition to his academic duties as music journalist, exhibition curator and concert dramaturg. He has been editor of the series of publications of the International Schönberg Society and since 2006 (together with Klaus Pietschmann and Wilhelm Seidel) of the journal Musiktheorie.

Since 2007 Schmidt has been "titular professor" in the field of modern music history at the Musicology Department of the University of Basel. He is a board member of several foundations and forums, 2010-2017 he was a member of the board of directors of the NCCR Eikones (Basel). In 2017 Schmidt was elected to the Austrian Academy of Sciences.

== Research ==
Schmidt's work focuses on the history and aesthetics of music of the 18th to 20th centuries (books on Wolfgang Amadeus Mozart, Johannes Brahms, Arnold Schönberg and Ernst Krenek, among others). Schmidt is also particularly interested in persons and phenomena that lie beyond canonized historiography: for example, he has worked together with students on exhibitions and publications on the composers Felix Weingartner and Yevgeny Gunst as well as on the Swiss origins of the national anthem of Lesotho.

== Miscellaneous ==
The Viennese musicologist Elisabeth Haas has made an attempt to give Schmidt's book Komponierte Kindheit a thorough critique. In Die Musikforschung Haas argues that Schmidt ignores widely used sources and uses the thoughts of others for his own. But where Schmidt relied on himself, there were numerous mistakes in his explanations, each of which testified to insufficient knowledge of the music texts. However, in the same issue of Die Musikforschung Schmidt was able to refute the criticism in a counterstatement and the accusations contained therein.

== Publications ==
- Im Gefälle der Zeit. Ernst Kreneks Werke für Sologesang. Kassel 1998.
- Theorie und Praxis der Zwölftontechnik. Ernst Krenek und die Reihenkomposition der Wiener Schule.Laaber 1998.
- Johannes Brahms. Ein Versuch über die musikalische Selbstreflexion. Wilhelmshaven 2000 (Taschenbücher zur Musikwissenschaft, 137).
- Komponierte Kindheit. Laaber 2004. (Spektrum der Musik, 7).
- Schönberg und Mozart. Aspekte einer Rezeptionsgeschichte. Vienna 2004 (Publications of the International Schönberg-Society 5).
- Matthias Schmidt, Arne Stollberg (editors): Das Bildliche und das Unbildliche. Nietzsche, Wagner und das Musikdrama. Fink, Paderborn 2015.
- Johannes Brahms, die Lieder. Ein musikalischer Werkführer. Munich 2015.
