= Vít Zouhar =

Vít Zouhar (born 1966) is a Czech composer, pedagog, and musicologist. He is the son of Zdeněk Zouhar, who was also a composer, educator and musicologist, and close friend of Martinů.
