= Arne Stollberg =

German musicologist and university professor

Arne Stollberg (born in 1973) is a German musicologist and university professor.

== Career ==
Born in Wetzlar, Stollberg studied musicology as well as theatre, film and media studies at the Goethe University Frankfurt. From 2001 to 2012 he worked first as an assistant, then as senior assistant and finally as a lecturer at the Institute for Musicology of the University of Bern. From 2012, he was professor at the University of Basel.

In 2014, Stollberg was appointed to the Institute of Musicology at the Humboldt University of Berlin and since April 2015 he has been Professor of Historical Musicology at the Institute of Musicology and Media Studies at the Humboldt University of Berlin. Stollberg's research focus is primarily in the field of music aesthetics and musical analysis, but is also a specialist in music theatre and instrumental music from the 18th to the 21st century.

Stollberg is also the editor of anthologies and conference proceedings. He is also co-editor and editor of the journal Wagnerspectrum.

Stollberg is married to the musicologist Ivana Rentsch.

== Publications ==
- Durch den Traum zum Leben. Erich Wolfgang Korngold's opera Die tote Stadt.

Author: Arne Stollberg Mainz 2003. 2nd edition 2004 (Musik im Kanon der Künste. 1).

- Ohr und Auge – Klang und Form. Facetten einer musikästhetischen Dichotomie bei Johann Gottfried Herder, Richard Wagner and Franz Schreker. Stuttgart 2006 (Supplements to the Archiv für Musikwissenschaft. 58).
- Arne Stollberg (ed.): Erich Wolfgang Korngold: Wunderkind der Moderne oder letzter Romantiker? Essaysammlung. edition text + kritik, Munich 2008, ISBN 978-3-88377-954-6.
- Tönend bewegte Dramen. Die Idee des Tragischen in der Orchestermusik vom späten 18. bis zum frühen 20. Jahrhundert. Munich 2014.
- Matthias Schmidt, Arne Stollberg (ed.): Das Bildliche und das Unbildliche. Nietzsche, Wagner und das Musikdrama. Fink, Paderborn 2015.

== Awards ==
- 2005: Prix jubilé of the Schweizerische Akademie der Geistes- und Sozialwissenschaften (SAGW)
- 2011: Theodor-Kocher-Preis of the University of Bern
- 2012 until 2015: Professorship of the Swiss National Science Foundation at the Musicology Seminar of the University of Basel, with the project Hörbare Gebärden – Der Körper in der Musik.
