= Field Mass =

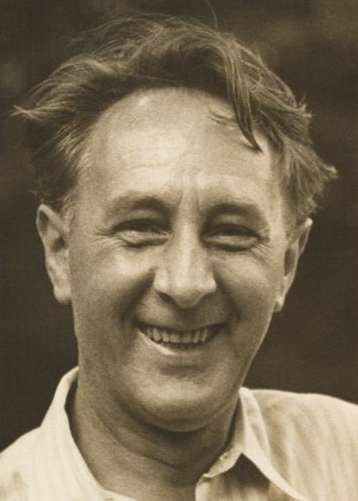
Bohuslav Martinů in 1943

The Field Mass (Czech: Polní mše), H. 279, is a Czech language cantata from 1939 by Bohuslav Martinů. It was written to honor Czech volunteers fighting in the French army. The libretto does not follow a traditional mass text but a free libretto written by Jiří Mucha based on Psalm texts and liturgical texts. The work is written for a baritone singer, male chorus, wind instruments, piano, harmonium and percussion.

The Czech choreographer Jiří Kylián created his ballet for 12 male dancers, Soldier's Mass, to this music in 1980 with the Nederlands Dans Theater.
