= Ariane (Martinů) =

- by Bohuslav Martinů
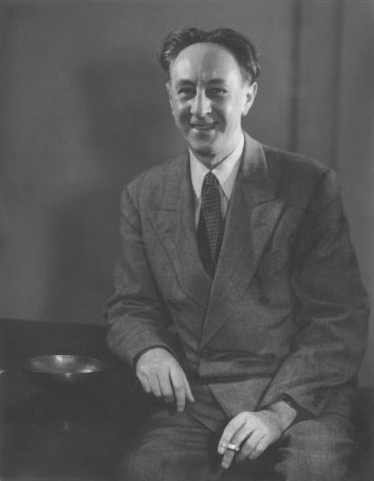
- Martinů in 1945
- Librettist: Martinů
- Language: French
- Based on: Le Voyage de Thésée by Georges Neveux
- Premiere: 1961; Musiktheater im Revier, Gelsenkirchen

Ariane is a one-act opera by Bohuslav Martinů to a French libretto by the composer drawn from the second, third and fourth acts of the 1943 play Le Voyage de Thésée by Georges Neveux, who had supplied the text to the composer's earlier opera Julietta.

== Performance history ==
Martinů composed Ariane in 1958 whilst working on his final opera, The Greek Passion – he described it in a letter to his family as 'taking a rest' from the larger work. The composition took just over a month. The bravura style of the writing for Ariadne reflects Martinů's admiration of Maria Callas. The opera is in a straightforward lyrical style with deliberate references to the operas of Monteverdi and other early composers. The year of composition had seen the premiere of his three Parables for orchestra, where the third movement includes "a mysterious figure from [Neveux's] play, the drummer from Knossos is to be heard: it is his fate to announce weddings or funerals...". Neveux not only wrote the libretto for Julietta premiered in 1938, but also that of Martinů's 1953 unfinished opera Plainte contre inconnu.

Grove describes the music as being in a "warm, mainly tonal lyricism", at times "enlivened by neo-Baroque rhythmic patterns".

The first performance took place in 1961 at the Musiktheater im Revier in Gelsenkirchen, Germany, as the centre-piece of a triple-bill with Mahagonny by Brecht and Weill and Der Analphabet by Ivo Lhotka-Kalinski, two years after the composer's death.

The Czech premiere took place on 23 October 1962 in Brno alongside Ariadne-themed pieces by Claudio Monteverdi and Jiří Antonín Benda, conducted by Richard Týnský, with Miriam Šupurkovská in the title role. In September that year the opera was broadcast live radio on Czechoslovak Radio Brno, conducted by František Jílek, with Cecilie Strádalová.

The Russian premiere was in Moscow in March 2016, conducted by Maria Maksimchuk.

In 2022 a critical edition by Robert Simon, from the Bohuslav Martinů Institute in Prague, with the full orchestral score, was published by Bärenreiter, including the libretto, a foreword which puts a spotlight on correspondence at the time of its composition, a critical summary of the sources, and reproductions of parts of the autograph.

== Roles ==
Role	Voice type	Premiere cast 2 March 1961 Conductor: Ljubomir Romansky
Ariane (Ariadne)	soprano	Annemarie Dölitzsch
Thésée (Theseus)	baritone	Klaus Kirchner
Minotaur	bass	Walther Finkelberg
Bouroun Theseus's comrade	tenor	Willi Kunzmann
Watchman	tenor	Erich Benke
Old Man	bass	Theo Strosyk
Five youths of Athens, companions of Theseus	tenors and basses	Josef Connotte, Otto Heppenheimer, Eduard Mayer, Günter Reich, Franz Wyzner

== Synopsis ==
The story is a surrealist version of the myth of Theseus, Ariadne, and the Minotaur.

In this version of the myth, the Minotaur and Theseus look alike - and Theseus discerns part of his own personality in the monster; by killing it he destroys his love for Ariadne.

Prologue – Sinfonia 1

The Watchman learns of the arrival in Knossos of Thésée and his companions from a passing seagull.

Scene 1

Thésée seeks the Minotaur and encounters Ariane. In an ambiguous conversation they seem to fall in love – but Ariane's love may be in fact for the Minotaur. The Old Man announces that the king's daughter is to be married to a stranger. Ariane reveals that she is the king's daughter and Thésée is the stranger – and asks for his name.

Scene 2

After a second sinfonia, Bouroun is dissatisfied that Thésée's infatuation with Ariane is preventing him from killing the Minotaur. Resolving to do the deed himself, he is killed by the Minotaur (offstage). When the Minotaur appears, he turns out to be Theseus's double, and taunts him – "who dares lift his hand to strike himself a death-blow?". Thésée slays the Minotaur however.

Scene 3

A third sinfonia separates the scenes. Thésée and his companions desert Ariane, whose lyrical lament closes the opera.

The whole opera, including the three miniature sinfonias which introduce and punctuate it, lasts little more than 40 minutes (of which Ariane's lament takes about 9).
