= Daniela Philippi =

German musicologist (born 1966)

Daniela Philippi (born 1966) is a German musicologist with a research focus on Christoph Willibald Gluck, Antonín Dvořák and Czech music history and music of the 20th century.

== Life ==
Born in Limburg an der Lahn, Philippi studied musicology, journalism as well as general and comparative literature at the Johannes Gutenberg University Mainz from 1985 to 1992. From 1985 to 1989, she also studied at the Episcopal Institute of Church Music of the Diocese of Mainz, where she graduated in 1989 with the church musician examination C. In 1992, she received her doctorate under Christoph-Hellmut Mahling at the Musicological Institute of the Johannes Gutenberg University Mainz on the subject Antonín Dvořák – The Spectre's Bride (Svatební košile) op. 69 and The St. Ludmila (Svatá Ludmila) op. 71. studies of the great vocal form in the 19th century.

Since 1993, she has been a research fellow at the Gluck-Gesamtausgabe in the Academy of sciences in Mainz. From 1991 to 2000, she was also assistant lecturer at the Musicological Institute of the Johannes Gutenberg University in Mainz. In 2000, she was awarded the habilitation and the Venia legendi for the subject Musicology at the Department of History of the Johannes Gutenberg University Mainz. The habilitation thesis dealt with the topic The New in Contemporary Organ Music since the late 1950s.

From 2000 to 2007, Philippi was a private lecturer, from 2007 to 2011 she was an associate professor at the Musicological Institute of the Johannes Gutenberg University Mainz. In 2002, she became a member of the editorial board of the Gluck-Gesamtausgabe. From 2002 to 2018, she was a member of the preparatory working group (2004 to 2018 Editorial Board) of the Neue Dvořák-Gesamtausgabe/New Dvořák Edition (NDE), where she also became a research Fellow in 2006. Since 2003, she has been a member of the editorial board of the Martinů-Gesamtausgabe. From 2003 to 2005, Philippi also taught musicology at the Robert Schumann University of Music Düsseldorf. From 2005 to 2018, she was a member of the international editorial board (Mezinárodní redakční rada) of the journal Hudební věda published by the Czech Academy of Sciences in Prague.

In the summer semester 2009, she took up a teaching position at the Musicology Department of the Ruprecht-Karls-University of Heidelberg. In the academic year 2009/10, she held a professorship at the Institute for Musicology at the Johann Wolfgang Goethe University Frankfurt. In the winter semester 2010/11, she held a teaching position there. From 2011 to 2024, Daniela Philippi held the Academy Professorship at the Institute of Musicology at the Johann Wolfgang Goethe University in Frankfurt am Main. Since the summer semester of 2025, she has held the position of Acting Professor of Historical Musicology at this Institute. Since 2013, she has been the 1st chairperson of the Frankfurt association Musica Judaica, since 2019 also 1st chairperson of the Frankfurt Telemann Society.

== Work ==
=== Monographs ===
- Antonín Dvořák – Die Geisterbraut / Svatební košile op. 69 and Die heilige Ludmilla / Svatá Lumila op. 71. Studien zur "großen Vokalform" im 19. Jahrhundert (Mainzer Studien zur Musikwissenschaft 30). Hans Schneider, Tutzing 1993.
- Neue Orgelmusik. Werke und Kompositionstechniken von der Avantgarde bis zur pluralistischen Moderne. Bärenreiter, Kassel usw. 2002.
- "Die Leute singen mit so viel Feuer …". Der Cäcilienchor Frankfurt 1818 bis 2018. Edited by Daniela Philippi and Ralf-Olivier Schwarz. Henrich, Frankfurt2018.

=== Academic scientific notes ===
- Christoph Willibald Gluck: Le Cadi dupé one-act opéra comique by Pierre-René Lemonnier / Deutsche Version von Johann André. In Christoph Willibald Gluck. Sämtliche Werke, Abteilung IV: Französische komische Opern, vol. 6. Bärenreiter, Kassel usw. 1999.
- Christoph Willibald Gluck: La contesa dei Numi, Componimento drammatico, text by Pietro Metastasio, edited by Thomas Clitau. In Christoph Willibald Gluck. Sämtliche Werke, Abteilung III: Italienische Opere serie und Opernserenaden, vol. 13. Bärenreiter, Kassel usw. 2004.
- Christoph Willibald Gluck: Oden und Lieder, edited by Daniela Philippi and Heinrich W. Schwab. In Christoph Willibald Gluck. Sämtliche Werke, Abteilung VI: Vokalmusik, vol. 2. Bärenreiter, Kassel usw. 2011.
- Christoph Willibald Gluck: Cythère assiégée, Opéra-ballet in three acts (Paris 1775), edited by Daniela Philippi. In Christoph Willibald Gluck. Sämtliche Werke, Abteilung IV: Französische komische Opern, vol. 9. Bärenreiter, Kassel usw. 2019.

=== Articles in collected editions and professional magazines ===
- Dvořák und die Entwicklungen oratorischer Formen im 19. Jahrhundert. In Dvořák-Studien, edited by Klaus Döge uad Peter Jost, Mainz etc. 1994, pp. 147–155. (Published in English under the title: Dvořák and the Development of Oratorio in the Nineteenth Century, in Czech Music 18/1, 1993, pp. 45–57).
- Andreas Romberg's Vertonung Das Lied von der Glocke. In Festschrift Christoph-Hellmut Mahling zum 65. Geburtstag (Mainzer Studien zur Musikwissenschaft 37), edited by Axel Beer, Kristina Pfarr and Wolfgang Ruf, Tutzing 1997, pp. 1077–1093.
- Neue Musik für Bläser und Orgel – mit und ohne Schlagzeug. In Kongreßbericht Mainz 1996 (Alta Musica 20), edited by Eugen Brixel, Tutzing 1998, pp. 293–306.
- Theo Brandmüller's "Missa" in der Sprache unserer pluralistischen Zeit. In Musica sacra 118, 1998/1, pp. .–57.
- Zur Quellenlage von Glucks Opéras-comiques. Ein Arbeits- und Forschungsbericht. In Kolloquiumsbericht der Gluck-Gesamtausgabe. Tanzdramen / Opéra-comique (Gluck-Studien 2), edited by Gabriele Buschmeier and Klaus Hortschansky, Kassel etc. 2000, pp. 101–113.
- Weder Bürger- noch Pfaffenschreck. Zur aktuellen Situation zeitgenössischer Orgelmusik. In Organ 3/99, pp. 10–18.
- Zum Kanon konzertant verwendeter Arien von Christoph Willibald Gluck. In Mozart-Jahrbuch 2000, pp. 215–224.
- Galanter Stil – ein Phänomen jenseits nationaler Idiome in der Musik der ersten Hälfte des 18. Jahrhunderts? (überarbeitete Fassung des Habilitationsvortrags vom 15. November 2000). In Der Galante Diskurs. Kommunikation und Epochenschwelle (Arbeiten zur Neueren deutschen Literatur 6), edited by Thomas Borgstedt and Andreas Solbach, Dresden 2001,pp. 355–368.
- Besetzungsmuster der Musikgeschichte in der zeitgenössischen Kammermusik. In Kammermusik in "gemischten" Besetzungen (Schloss Engers Colloquia zur Kammermusik 3), Mainz 2002, pp. 159–179.
- Erzählungen ohne Worte oder Poetische Klavierstücke? Klavierballaden des 19. Jahrhunderts. In Musikwissenschaft aktuell. Vorträge und Referate der Tagung der Gesellschaft für Musikforschung, Mainz 1997, hrsg. von Christoph-Hellmut Mahling und Kristina Pfarr, Mainz 2002, pp. 297–313.
- Kompositionen Chopins in Choreographien des 20. Jahrhunderts. In Chopin 1849/1999. Aspekte der Rezeptions- und Interpretationsgeschichte, edited by Andreas Ballstaedt, Schliengen 2003, pp. 126–137.
- Zwischen Gebrauchsmusik und Autonomie. Struktur und Zeitgestaltung der Minimal Music im Film. In Film und Musik (Augen-Blick – Marburger und Mainzer Hefte zur Medienwissenschaft 35), Schüren 2004, pp. 88–100.
- Traditionelle Muster als Material. Zur Konzeption der 3. Sinfonie Krzysztof Pendereckis. In Krzysztof Penderecki – Musik im Kontext. Konferenzbericht Leipzig 2003, edited by Helmut Loos and Stefan Keym, Leipzig 2006, pp. 167–181.
- Konnte es eine konzertante Gluck-Pflege geben? – Ergebnisse der Quellenforschung. In Kammermusik an Rhein und Main. Beiträge zur Geschichte des Streichquartetts (Colloquia zur Kammermusik IV), edited by Kristina Pfarr and Karl Böhmer, Mainz 2007,pp. 75–86.
- Aufbruch zur Neuen Musik in der Kirche oder der Ruf nach Wahrheit. Die ästhetischen Positionen der Reihe neue musik in der kirche / Wochen für geistliche Musik der Gegenwart 1965–1983. In Rebellische Musik. Gesellschaftlicher Protest und kultureller Wandel um 1968 (musicolonia 1), edited by Arnold Jacobshagen and Markus Leniger, Cologne 2007, pp. 275–289.
- Zur Varianz der musikalischen Form "Air" in Christoph Willibald Gluck's Cythère assiégée II. In Aria. Eine Festschrift für Wolfgang Ruf (Studien und Materialien zur Musikwissenschaft 65), edited by Wolfgang Hirschmann, Hildesheim – Zurich – New York 2011, pp. 473–487.
- Fortführung der Tradition und Kirchenmusikerausbildung heute. In Der Kirchenmusiker: Berufe - Institutionen - Wirkungsfelder, edited by Franz Körndle and Joachim Kremer (Enzyklopädie der Kirchenmusik, vol. 3), Laaber 2015, pp. 373–390.
- Christoph Willibald Gluck - Sämtliche Werke. In Musikeditionen im Wandel der Geschichte, edited by Reinmar Emans and Ulrich Krämer (Bausteine zur Geschichte der Edition, 5), Berlin/Boston 2015, pp. 261–287.
- Tradition und Moderne in der Musik von Bernhard Sekles. In: Daniela Philippi, Stefana Sabin: Bernhard Sekles. Musikpädagoge und Komponist (= Jüdische Miniaturen, 310), Berlin – Leipzig 2023, pp. 54–95.
- "Ich wurde des Lulli, Campra, und anderer guten Autoren Arbeiten habhafft." Musiktransfer im frühen 18. Jahrhundert in Telemanns Umfeld. In: Birger Petersen, Stefan Michels (Hrsg.): Der "Französische Jahrgang" Georg Philipp Telemanns. (= Musik und Theologie, 1), Stuttgart 2026, pp. 71–78.
