= Bohuslav Martinů =

Czech composer (1890–1959)

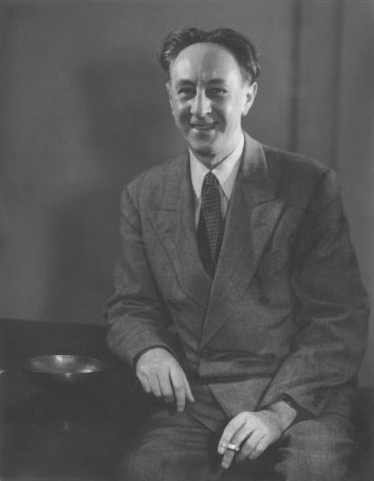
- Martinů in New York City, 1945
- Born: December 8, 1890; Polička, Austria-Hungary (now Czech Republic)
- Died: August 28, 1959 (aged 68); Liestal, Switzerland

Bohuslav Jan Martinů (Czech: [ˈboɦuslaf ˈmarcɪnuː]; December 8, 1890 – August 28, 1959) was a Czech composer of modern classical music. He wrote 6 symphonies, 15 operas, 14 ballet scores, and a large body of orchestral, chamber, vocal, and instrumental works. He became a violinist in the Czech Philharmonic Orchestra, and briefly studied under Czech composer and violinist Josef Suk. After leaving Czechoslovakia in 1923 for Paris, Martinů deliberately withdrew from the Romantic style in which he had been trained. During the 1920s he experimented with modern French stylistic developments, exemplified by his orchestral works Half-time and La Bagarre. He also adopted jazz idioms, for instance in his Kitchen Revue (Kuchyňská revue).

In the early 1930s he found his main fount for compositional style: neoclassicism, creating textures far denser than those found in composers treating Stravinsky as a model. He was prolific, quickly composing chamber, orchestral, choral, and instrumental works. His Concerto Grosso and the Double Concerto for Two String Orchestras, Piano and Timpani are among his best-known works from this period. Among his operas, Juliette and The Greek Passion are considered the finest. He has been compared to Prokofiev and Bartók in his innovative incorporation of Czech folk elements into his music. He continued using Bohemian and Moravian folk melodies throughout his oeuvre, for instance in The Opening of the Springs (Otvírání studánek).

His symphonic career began when he emigrated to the United States in 1941, fleeing the German invasion of France. His six symphonies were performed by all the major US orchestras. Martinů returned to live in Europe for two years starting in 1953, then was back in New York until returning to Europe in May 1956. He died in Switzerland in August 1959.

== Life ==
=== 1890–1923: Polička and Prague ===
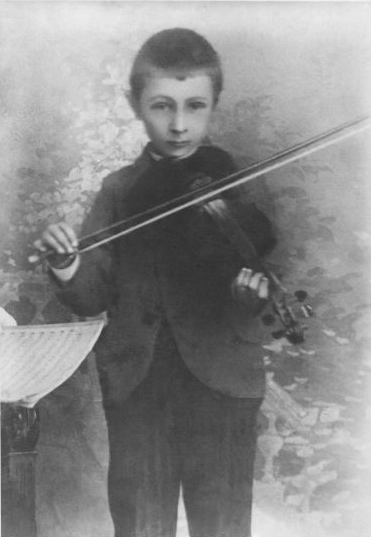
Martinů as a child playing the violin (c. 1896)

The setting of Martinů's birth was unusual. He was born in the tower of the St. Jakub Church in Polička, a town in Bohemia, close to the Moravian border. His father, Ferdinand, a shoemaker, also worked as the church sexton and town fire watchman. For this, he and his family were allowed to live in the tower apartment. As a small boy Bohuslav was sickly, and frequently had to be carried up the 193 steps to the tower on the back of his father or his older sister. In school he was known to be very shy, and did not participate in the plays or pageants with his classmates. But as violinist, he excelled and developed a strong reputation, giving his first public concert in his hometown in 1905. The townspeople raised enough money to fund his schooling, and in 1906 he left the countryside to begin studies at the Prague Conservatory.

Whilst there he fared poorly as a student, showing little interest in the rigid pedagogy or the hours of violin practice required. He was far more interested in exploring Prague and learning on his own, attending concerts and reading books on many subjects. This was in contrast to his roommate, Stanislav Novák, an excellent student and brilliant violinist. They frequently attended concerts together at which Martinů became engrossed in analyzing new music, particularly French impressionist works. He could memorize much of it, to the extent that when back in their room, he could write out large parts of the score almost perfectly. Novák was astonished at how meticulously Martinů could do this. He became convinced that his roommate, while lacking in other subjects, possessed an incredible brain for analyzing and memorizing music.

They became friends for life. Dropped from the violin program, Martinů was moved to the organ department that taught composition, but dismissed in 1910 for "incorrigible negligence".

Martinů spent the next several years living back home in Polička, attempting to gain some standing in the musical world. He had written several compositions by this time, including the Elegie for violin and piano, and the symphonic poems Angel of Death (Anděl smrti) and Death of Tintagiles (Smrt Tintagilova), and submitted samples of his work to Josef Suk, a leading Czech composer. Suk encouraged him to pursue formal composition training, but this would not be possible for years. In the meantime, he passed the state teaching examination and maintained a studio in Polička throughout World War I, while continuing to compose and study on his own. It was during this time that he studied the ancient choral hymns of the Bohemian Brethren, which influenced his style and musical scope.

As World War I drew to a close and Czechoslovakia was declared an independent republic, Martinů composed the celebratory cantata Czech Rhapsody (Česká rapsodie), which premiered in 1919 to great acclaim. He toured Europe as a violinist with the National Theatre Orchestra, and in 1920 became a full member of the Czech Philharmonic Orchestra that was led by the inspired young conductor Václav Talich, who was the first major conductor to promote Martinů. He also began formal composition study under Suk. During these last years in Prague he completed his first string quartet and two ballets: Who is the Most Powerful in the World? (Kdo je na světě nejmocnější?) and Istar.

=== 1923–1940: Paris ===
Martinů finally departed for Paris in 1923, having received a small scholarship from the Czechoslovak Ministry of Education. He sought out Albert Roussel, whose individualistic style he respected, and began a series of informal lessons with him. Roussel would teach Martinů until his death in 1937 by helping him focus and bring order to his compositions, rather than instructing him in a specific style. During his first years in Paris, Martinů incorporated many of the trends at the time, including jazz, neoclassicism, and surrealism. He was particularly attracted to Stravinsky, whose novel, angular, propulsive rhythms and sonorities reflected the industrial revolution, sports events and motorised transportation. Ballets were his favorite medium for experimentation, including The Revolt (1925), The Butterfly That Stamped (1926), Le raid merveilleux (1927), La revue de cuisine (1927), and Les larmes du couteau (1928). Martinů found friends in the Czechoslovak artistic community in Paris and would always retain close ties to his homeland, frequently returning during the summer. He continued to look to his Bohemian and Moravian roots for musical ideas. His best-known work from this time is the ballet Špalíček (1932–33), which incorporates Czech folk tunes and nursery rhymes.

The prime leader of new symphonic music in Paris at this time was Serge Koussevitzky, who presented the biannual Concerts Koussevitzsky (1921–29). He became the conductor of the Boston Symphony Orchestra in 1924, but still returned to Paris each summer to conduct his Concerts. In 1927, Martinů happened to see him at a café, introduced himself, and gave him the score of a symphonic triptych, La bagarre, that was inspired by Charles Lindbergh's recent landing. The maestro was impressed, and scheduled its premiere with the Boston Symphony in November 1927.

In 1926, Martinů met Charlotte Quennehen (1894–1978), a French seamstress from Picardy. She was employed at a large garment factory and, after their romance began, she moved into his small flat and helped to support him. She would become an important force in his life, handling the cuisine and business matters that he found trying. They married in 1931. Culturally, however, the two were quite different, a fact that would cause problems in their marriage over the years.

By 1930, Martinů had withdrawn from his seven years of experimentation to settle on a neo-classical style. In 1932, he won the Coolidge prize for the best of 145 chamber music works for his String Sextet with Orchestra. This was performed by Koussevitzsky with the Boston Symphony Orchestra in 1932. Martinu finished his opera Julietta in 1936; this was based upon a surrealistic play by Georges Neveux that he had seen in 1927. Its premiere was given in Prague under Václav Talich on 14 March 1938.

In 1937, Martinů became acquainted with a young Czech woman, Vítězslava Kaprálová, who was already a highly accomplished musician when she arrived in Paris, supported by a small Czech government grant to study conducting with Charles Munch and composition with Martinů. Their relationship soon developed beyond that of student-teacher as he fell madly in love with her. After she returned to Czechoslovakia, Martinů wrote her many long, passionate letters. In one of these, he proposed that he would divorce Charlotte and then take her to America. It was while he was in this distraught, frenzied state that Martinů composed one of his greatest works, the Double Concerto for two string orchestras, piano and timpani. It was finished just a few days before the Munich Agreement was sealed (30 September 1938). Corinna De Fonseca-Wollheim of the New York Times attributed the concerto's anguished tone to Martinů's embitterment over the loss of part of his homeland to Nazi Germany.

After the Munich Agreement, President Edvard Beneš began to form a Czechoslovak government in exile set up in France and England. As a significant number of troops became organized into a Czech resistance force, Martinů tried to join them but was rejected because of his age. However, in 1939, he composed a tribute to this force, the Field Mass for baritone, chorus and orchestra. It was broadcast from England and was picked up in occupied Czechoslovakia. For this, Martinů was blacklisted by the Nazis and sentenced in absentia. In 1940, as the German army approached Paris, the Martinůs fled. They were sheltered by Charles Munch who had a place near Limoges. Soon, they journeyed on to Aix-en-Provence, where they stayed for six months while trying to find transit out of Vichy France. He was helped by the Czech artistic community, particularly Rudolf Kundera, along with Edmonde Charles-Roux and the Countess Lily Pastré. Despite the harsh conditions, he found inspiration in Aix and composed several works, notably the Sinfonietta giocosa. Charlotte wrote: "We fell in love with Aix: the delicate murmur of its fountains calmed our agitated feelings and later Bohus was inspired by them." Finally, on 8 January 1941, they left Marseilles for Madrid and Portugal, eventually reaching the United States in 1941 with the help of his friend, the diplomat Miloš Šafránek, and especially from Martinů's Swiss benefactor, Paul Sacher, the conductor of the Basel Chamber Orchestra, who arranged and paid for their passages.

=== 1941–1953: US ===
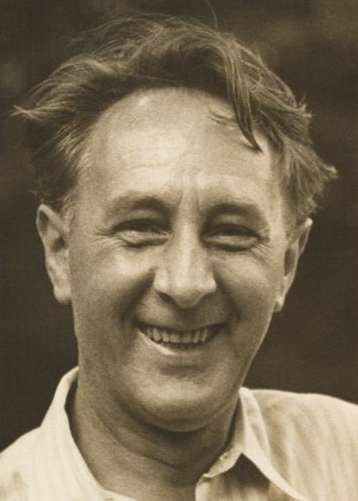
Martinů in c. 1942

Life in the United States was difficult for him initially, just as it was for many other artist émigrés in similar circumstances. Lack of knowledge of English, of funds, and of opportunities to use their talents were common to them. When they first arrived in New York, the Martinůs rented a studio apartment at the Great Northern Hotel on 57th St. They were helped by several musician friends, including pianist Rudolf Firkušný, violinist Samuel Dushkin, cellist Frank Rybka, diplomat Miloš Šafránek, and multi-lingual lawyer Jan Löwenbach. Martinů soon found that he was unable to resume composing in noisy Manhattan, so for the following season they leased a small apartment in Jamaica Estates, Queens, close to the Rybkas. This leafy, residential neighborhood was conducive for him to take long solitary walks at night, during which he would work out music scores in his head. On several occasions he would "zone out" in deep concentration about the music, becoming oblivious of his surroundings and getting lost, and would then call a friend with a car to come find him and take him back home. Thereafter, he began to compose actively. When he contacted Serge Koussevitzsky, the conductor told him that his Concerto Grosso would receive its premiere in Boston the following season. One of the first compositions Martinů wrote in New York was the Concerto da Camera for violin and small orchestra, in fulfillment of a commission he had been awarded before the war by Paul Sacher. The following year, they moved back to Manhattan into an apartment in a brownstone on 58th St, across from the Hotel Plaza. That was where they lived for the rest of their years in America. Composer David Diamond, who sub-leased this apartment in 1954, has described it in an interview.

"As the War was coming to an end, the Martinůs encountered marital difficulties. Charlotte, who never did like America, wanted strongly to return to France. He did not, so when he accepted Koussevitzky's offer to teach at the Berkshire Music School for the summer of 1946, she went to France alone for a prolonged visit. In Great Barrington, Massachusetts, he was lodged with the students in Searles Castle, and his magnificent master bedroom opened onto a terrace. One night, Martinů took his customary walk on the terrace, a section of which had no railing, and he fell off, landing on concrete, and was hospitalized with a fractured skull and concussion. He drifted in and out of a coma, but survived. After several weeks he was released to recuperate with friends. By this time, Roe Barstow had entered his life. She was an attractive divorcee of independent means, who lived alone in Greenwich Village. With Charlotte away in France, she was at Martinů's side, assisting in his recovery, during which their relationship deepened. After Charlotte returned in the late fall, she found that her husband was a different man: gaunt, irritable, crippled and in pain from the accident. It required a few years before he was able to return to his former state as a solid composer."

Apart from his domestic problems, Martinů was unsure about which country he would live in. He had considered returning to Czechoslovakia as a teacher, despite having a powerful enemy there in the communist politician Zdeněk Nejedlý. Any plans to return were further hampered by the 1948 Czechoslovak coup d'état. With the communists' seizure of power, music, along with the other arts, became an instrument of propaganda along Soviet ideological lines. Martinů was branded as a formalist and émigré traitor, and he chose wisely not to pursue any kind of professional engagement in his native land from this time forward. Martinů became an American citizen in 1952.

Martinů was indeed reluctant to leave America, which had been very supportive of him. He taught at the Mannes College of Music for most of the period from 1948 to 1956, where he taught Burt Bacharach, was close to the Mannes family, and was a key member of the composition faculty. He also taught at Princeton University and the Berkshire Music School (Tanglewood). At Princeton he was warmly received by faculty and students. His six symphonies were written in the eleven-year period 1942–1953, the first five being produced between 1942 and 1946. In addition, he composed the Violin Concerto No. 2, Memorial to Lidice for orchestra, Concerto for Two Pianos and Orchestra, Piano Concerto No. 3, Concerto da Camera for violin and small orchestra, Sinfonietta La Jolla for piano and small orchestra, Sonatas Nos. 2 and 3 for cello and piano, many chamber compositions, and a television opera, The Marriage (Ženitba). His symphonic scores were performed by most of the major orchestras: Boston, New York, Philadelphia, Cleveland, Chicago, and he generally received fine reviews from the leading critics.

Owing to the extraordinary volume of Martinů's oeuvre, some critics who never knew the man have stated that he composed too much, too fast, and therefore must have been careless in quality. However, he has been defended strongly by musicians and critics who did know him. Olin Downes knew Martinů better. For his interviews of Martinů, he had the benefit of having Jan Löwenbach, a friend of both men, present as an interpreter. Downes' defense of the composer came out in an article, "Martinu at 60". "Martinu […] is incapable of an unthorough or conscienceless job. He works very hard, systematically, scrupulously, modestly. He produces so much music because in the first place, his nature necessitates this. He has to write music. In the second place, he knows his business and loves it." The composer David Diamond knew Martinů both in Paris and New York. In an interview years later, he expressed amazement at how extraordinary Martinů's mind was in developing a whole orchestral score while taking a walk.

Martinů's notable students include Burt Bacharach, Alan Hovhaness, Vítězslava Kaprálová, Louis Lane, Jan Novák, H. Owen Reed, Howard Shanet and Chou Wen-chung.

=== 1953–1959: Europe ===
In 1953, Martinů left the United States for France and settled in Nice, and completed his Fantaisies symphoniques; the following year he composed Mirandolina and piano sonata, and met Nikos Kazantzakis, beginning work on The Greek Passion. During 1955 he created several key works: the oratorio Gilgames (The Epic of Gilgamesh), the Oboe Concerto, Les Fresques de Piero della Francesca, and the cantata Otvirani studanek (The Opening of the Wells); Charles Munch conducted the Fantaisies symphoniques premiere in Boston which gained the composer the annual New York critics' prize for the work. In 1956, he took up an appointment as composer-in-residence at the American Academy in Rome and composed Incantation (his fourth piano concerto) and much of The Greek Passion, which he completed in January the following year.

Jan Smaczny commented that in the compositions of Martinů's last years "we find the composer attempting through his music a vicarious homecoming", although he never returned to Czechoslovakia. His prolific output continued in 1958 with The Parables for orchestra and the opera Ariane. The following year he attended the first production of Julietta since the premiere in Prague, in Wiesbaden. Further composition continued up to his death: the second version of The Greek Passion, the Nonet, the Madrigaly, and the cantatas Mikeš z hor (Mikeš from the Mountains) and The Prophecy of Isaiah, "one of the most striking and most individual of Martinů's works".

From 1956, he lived in Pratteln in Switzerland as a guest of Paul Sacher. He died of gastric cancer in Liestal, Switzerland, on 28 August 1959. His remains were moved and buried in Polička, Czechoslovakia, in 1979.

== Music ==
Martinů was a prolific composer who wrote almost 400 pieces. Many of his works are regularly performed or recorded, among them his oratorio The Epic of Gilgamesh (1955, Epos o Gilgamešovi), his six symphonies, concertos (these number almost thirty – four violin concertos, eight compositions for solo piano, four cello concertos, one of each for harpsichord, viola, and oboe, five double concertos, two triple concertos, and two concertos for four solo instruments and orchestra), an anti-war opera Comedy on the Bridge (Veselohra na mostě), chamber music (including eight string quartets, (Note: Martinů is usually credited with seven string quartets, but his String Quartet in E-flat major of 1917 (Halbreich no. 103) was premièred in 1994. There is also believed to have been a string quartet from 1912, given the number H. 60 but which is missing, and likewise two other missing quartet works from 1912 (H. 63 and 64); the composer's first known work, Three Horsemen (Tři jezdci, H. 1, ca. 1902), is also for string quartet) three piano quintets, (Note: From 1911 (premiered 2012) (H.35), 1933 (premiered 1934) (H.229) and 1944 (premiered 1945) (H.298). See Simon, pp. 36–38.) a piano quartet (Note: And one other quartet with piano, one with oboe, violin and cello from 1947)), a flute sonata, a clarinet sonatina and many others.

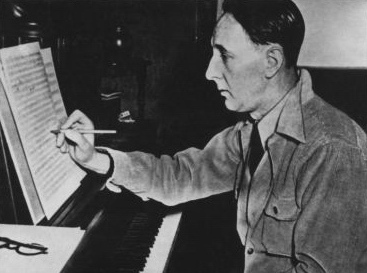
Bohuslav Martinů in New York, around 1942, at the piano working on his second symphony

A characteristic feature of his orchestral writing is the near-omnipresent piano; many of his orchestral works include a prominent part for piano, including his small Concerto for harpsichord and chamber orchestra. The bulk of his writing from the 1930s into the 1950s was in a neoclassical vein, but with his last works he opened up his style to include more rhapsodic gestures and a looser, more spontaneous sense of form. This is easiest to hear by comparing his Fantaisies symphoniques (Symphony No. 6), H 343, with its five predecessors, all from the 1940s.

One of Martinů's lesser known works features the theremin. Martinů started working on his Fantasia for theremin, oboe, string quartet and piano in the summer of 1944, and finished it on October 1. He dedicated it to Lucie Bigelow Rosen, who had commissioned it and was the theremin soloist at its premiere at New York's Town Hall on 3 November 1945, joined by the Koutzen Quartet, Robert Bloom (oboe), and Carlos Salzedo (piano).

His opera The Greek Passion is based on the novel of the same name by Nikos Kazantzakis, and his orchestral work Memorial to Lidice (Památník Lidicím) was written in remembrance of the village of Lidice that was destroyed by the Nazis in reprisal for the assassination of Reinhard Heydrich in the late spring of 1942. It was completed in August 1943 whilst he was in New York, and premiered there in October of that year.

== Personality ==
There have been many discussions about Martinů's personality, manners and possible Asperger syndrome. Frank James Rybka promoted the idea that Martinů suffered from this kind of autism spectrum disorder. He met Martinů in 1941, when the composer was 51 and Rybka was only six years old; later on he met him in 1951 and then in 1959, a month before the composer died.

According to Rybka, Martinů was quiet, introverted, and emotionally stolid when meeting persons he did not know well. He typically answered questions very slowly, even when conversing in his native Czech. He might fail to reciprocate socially when people would compliment his music, or do favors for him. Close friends found him to be a kind, gentle, self-effacing, unbiased person. In 2009, Rybka launched a retrospective study of the composer's unusual personality, based upon interviews of people who knew him, as well as a study of letters he had written to his family and friends. Evidence of his having an autism spectrum disorder was compiled and evaluated, using the established criteria found in the Diagnostic and Statistical Manual for Mental Disease (DSM-IV). This evidence was reviewed by a well-known autism neuroscientist who concurred that the composer had good evidence of having had an autistic spectrum disorder, most likely Asperger syndrome. This was described in their publication. In 2011, Rybka published a Martinů biography, in which such traits are reviewed, such as his failure of social reciprocity, his flat affect and stolidity, his phobias and extreme stage fright, his strict adherence to a ritualized schedule, and his zoning out into an aura, while walking with his mind deeply engrossed in composing. The biography concludes that there were both positive and negative ways Asperger's affected his life. It seems to have facilitated his extraordinary memory for music, and his ability to compose prolifically and skillfully, but it also left him unable to promote or showcase his music in public.

Against this, Erik Entwistle in his review of Rybka's publication emphasized three main points contradicting Rybka's conclusions. These are: firstly, that it is impossible to diagnose someone so many years after his death; secondly, that Asperger syndrome officially does not exist as a separate syndrome; and finally, that according to Entwistle, Rybka became obsessed with the idea of Martinů's disorder, finding evidence for his claim everywhere.

== Sources ==
- Hartl, Karla, and Erik Entwistle (eds.). The Kaprálová Companion. Lanham, MD: Lexington Books, 2011. ISBN 978-0-7391-6723-6 (cloth); ISBN 978-0-7391-6724-3 (electronic).
- Martinů, Charlotta. Můj život s Bohuslavem Martinů. Prague: Editio Baerenreiter, 2003.
- Rybka, F. James. Bohuslav Martinů: The Compulsion to Compose. Lanham, MD: Scarecrow Press, 2011. ISBN 978-0-8108-7761-0.
- Rybka, F. James, and Sally Osonoff. "Martinu's Impressive Quiet". "Czech Music" 23 (2009), 31–50.
- Simon, Robert C. (compiler). Bohuslav Martinů: a research and information guide. New York, Abingdon: Routledge, 2014. ISBN 978-0-415-74194-1.
- Entwistle, Eric (September 2012). "Bohuslav Martinů: The Compulsive to Compose". Notes: 93–96. doi:10.1353/not.2012.0136. S2CID 161758143.
