= List of compositions for keyboard and orchestra =

This is a list of musical compositions for keyboard instruments such as the piano, organ or harpsichord and orchestra. See entries for concerto, piano concerto, organ concerto and harpsichord concerto for a description of related musical forms.

== Compositions for keyboard and orchestra ==
=== A ===
- Luigi Abbiate
  - Piano concerto
- Johann Christian Ludwig Abeille
  - Grand Concerto in D major, op.6 (1763), for one piano four-hands and orchestra
- Carl Friedrich Abel
  - Concerto for harpsichord (or pianoforte), two violins and a cello in F major, op.11 No.1 (first printed in 1771)
  - Concerto for harpsichord (or pianoforte), two violins and a cello in B♭ major, op.11 No.2 (first printed in 1771)
  - Concerto for harpsichord (or pianoforte), two violins and a cello in E♭ major, op.11 No.3 (first printed in 1771)
  - Concerto for harpsichord (or pianoforte), two violins and a cello in D major, op.11 No.4 (first printed in 1771)
  - Concerto for harpsichord (or pianoforte), two violins and a cello in G major, op.11 No.5 (first printed in 1771)
  - Concerto for harpsichord (or pianoforte), two violins and a cello in C major, op.11 No.6 (first printed in 1771)
- Lev Abeliovich
  - Piano Concerto (1978–1980)
- Anton García Abril
  - Piano concerto
- Jean Absil
  - Concerto for Piano and Orchestra No. 1, Op. 30 (1938)
  - Concerto for Piano and Orchestra No. 2, Op. 131 (1967)
  - Concerto for Piano and Orchestra No. 3, Op. 162 (1973)
- John Adams
  - Century Rolls for piano and orchestra
- Richard Addinsell
  - Warsaw Concerto, for piano and orchestra
- Thomas Adès
  - Concerto conciso, op.18, for piano and orchestra
- Isaac Albéniz
  - Concierto fantástico in A minor, op. 78 (1887)
- Eugen d'Albert
  - Piano Concerto No. 1 in B minor, op. 2 (1883-4)
  - Piano Concerto No. 2 in E, op. 12 (1892)
- Frangis Ali-Sade
  - Piano concerto (1972)
- Charles-Valentin Alkan
  - Concerto da Camera No. 1 in A minor, op. 10 no. 1 (1828)
  - Concerto da Camera No. 2 in C♯ minor, op. 10 no. 2 (1828)
  - Concerto da Camera No. 3 in C♯ minor (reconstructed H. Macdonald)
  - Piano Concerto Op. 39 (orch Klindworth)
- Eyvind Alnæs
  - Piano concerto in D major, op. 27
- Anton Arensky
  - Piano Concerto in F minor, op. 2 (1883)
- Thomas Arne - 6 Favourite Concertos for harpsichord, piano, or organ (late 18th century)
- Malcolm Arnold
  - Concerto for Phyllis and Cyril, op. 104, for two pianos (3 hands; one pianist plays with both hands, the other with only one hand)
- Alexander Arutiunian
  - Piano Concertino (1951)
- Daniel Asia
  - Concerto for Piano and Orchestra (1994)
- Kurt Atterberg
  - Piano Concerto in B♭ Minor, Op. 37 (1927–35)
- Lera Auerbach
  - Piano Concerto No. 1 - River of Loss, Dialogue with Time, Wind of Oblivion (Sikorski)

=== B ===
- Milton Babbitt
  - Piano Concerto No. 1 (1985)
  - Piano Concerto No. 2 (1998)
- CPE Bach - about 50 keyboard concertos, including one for harpsichord and fortepiano.
- JC Bach - 6 Concertos for Harpsichord, Op. 1; 5 Concertos for Harpsichord; Concerto for Harpsichord in F minor; 6 Concertos for Keyboard, Op. 7; 6 Concertos for Keyboard, Op. 13
- Johann Sebastian Bach (all 1720s-1740s)
  - Harpsichord concertos:
  - BWV 1044 for harpsichord, flute, violin, strings and basso continuo in a minor, after his harpsichord Prelude and Fugue in a minor BWV 894 and his organ Sonata in d minor BWV 527
  - BWV 1050 for harpsichord, flute, violin, strings and basso continuo in D major (Brandenburg Concerto No. 5)
  - BWV 1052 for harpsichord, strings and basso continuo in D minor, presumed to have been transcribed from a lost violin concerto previously written by the composer himself, used again in the Sinfonia and opening chorus of cantata Wir müssen durch viel Trübsal, BWV 146 and the Sinfonia of cantata BWV 188
  - BWV 1053 for harpsichord, strings and basso continuo in E major, probably after a lost oboe concerto
  - BWV 1054 for harpsichord, strings and basso continuo in D major, after his violin concerto in E major, BWV 1042
  - BWV 1055 for harpsichord, strings and basso continuo in A major, after a lost oboe d'amore concerto
  - BWV 1056 for harpsichord, strings and basso continuo in F minor, probably after a lost violin concerto
  - BWV 1057 for harpsichord, 2 recorders, strings and basso continuo in F major, after Brandenburg concerto no.4 in G major, BWV 1049
  - BWV 1058 for harpsichord, strings and basso continuo in G minor, after his violin concerto in A minor, BWV 1041
  - BWV 1060 for 2 harpsichords, strings and basso continuo in C minor, after a lost violin and oboe concerto
  - BWV 1061 for 2 harpsichords, strings and basso continuo in C major; the harpsichord parts alone are considered the original concerto 'BWV 1061a' with the parts for strings and continuo added later
  - BWV 1062 for 2 harpsichords, strings and basso continuo in C minor, after his double violin concerto in D minor, BWV 1043
  - BWV 1063 for 3 harpsichords, strings and basso continuo in D minor
  - BWV 1064 for 3 harpsichords, strings and basso continuo in C major, after a lost triple violin concerto
  - BWV 1065 for 4 harpsichords, strings and basso continuo in A minor, after Vivaldi's concerto for 4 violins in B minor, RV 580 (l'estro armonico op.3 no.10, RV580)
- Leonardo Balada
  - Piano Concerto No. 3
- Mily Balakirev
  - Piano Concerto No. 1 in F♯ minor, Op. 1 (1855)
  - Piano Concerto No. 2 in E♭, Op. posth. (completed by Sergei Lyapunov, 1911)
- Samuel Barber
  - Piano Concerto, op. 38 (1962)
- Béla Bartók
  - Piano Concerto No. 1 in A, Sz. 83 (1929)
  - Piano Concerto No. 2 in G, Sz. 95 (1931)
  - Piano Concerto No. 3 in E, Sz. 119 (1945)
- Amy Beach
  - Piano Concerto in C♯ minor, op. 45 (1899)
- Ludwig van Beethoven
  - Piano Concerto No. 1 in C, op. 15 (1798)
  - Piano Concerto No. 2 in B♭, op. 19 (1795)
  - Piano Concerto No. 3 in C minor, op. 37 (1800)
  - Piano Concerto No. 4 in G, op. 58 (1805-6)
  - Piano Concerto No. 5 in E♭, op. 73 (1809), the Emperor
  - Piano Concerto in D, op. 61a (1806), Beethoven's own arrangement of the Violin Concerto
  - Piano Concerto in E♭, WoO 4 (1784), written in adolescence
- Victor Bendix
  - Piano Concerto in G minor, Op. 17 (1884)
- Arthur Benjamin
  - Piano Concertino (1928)
  - Concerto Quasi una Fantasia (1949)
- Richard Rodney Bennett
  - Piano Concerto (1968)
- William Sterndale Bennett
  - Piano Concerto No. 1 in D minor, Op 1
  - Piano Concerto No. 2 in E♭, Op. 4
  - Piano Concerto No. 3 in C minor, Op. 9 (1833)
  - Piano Concerto No. 4 in F minor, op. 19
  - Piano Concerto No. 5 in F minor
  - Caprice in E, Op 22
  - Adagio for piano and orchestra
- Peter Benoit
  - Piano Concerto, Op. 43b
- Luciano Berio
  - Concerto for Two Pianos and Orchestra (1973)
  - Points on a Curve to Find - Piano Concerto (1973-4)
- Lennox Berkeley
  - Piano Concerto in B♭, op. 29 (1947)
  - Concerto for Two Pianos and Orchestra, op. 30 (1948)
- Franz Berwald
  - Piano Concerto in D (1855)
- Howard Blake
  - Piano Concerto
- Arthur Bliss
  - Piano Concerto in B♭ (1939)
- Ernest Bloch
  - Concerto symphonique in B minor (1947-8)
- François-Adrien Boieldieu
  - Piano Concerto in F major
- Sergei Bortkiewicz
  - Piano concerto, op.1 (destroyed, material partly used in the Piano Concerto No.2)
  - Piano Concerto No. 1 in B♭, op. 16 (1913?)
  - Piano Concerto No. 2 in E♭, Op. 28, for left hand alone, written for Paul Wittgenstein
  - Piano Concerto No. 3 in C minor, Per Aspera ad Astra, op. 32 (1927?)
- Dmitry Bortniansky
  - Piano concerto in C major
- Johannes Brahms
  - Piano Concerto No. 1 in D minor, op. 15 (1859)
  - Piano Concerto No. 2 in B♭, op. 83 (1881)
- Frank Bridge
  - Fantasm for Piano and Orchestra (1931)
- Benjamin Britten
  - Piano Concerto in D, op. 13 (1938, revised 1945)
- Max Bruch
  - Concerto in A♭ minor for two pianos, Op. 88a (arranged from the Symphonic Suite No. 3 (Festive (Feierliche) Suite) for Organ and Orchestra Op. posth)
- Ignaz Brüll
  - Piano Concerto No. 1 in F, op. 10 (1860-1)
  - Piano Concerto No. 2 in C, op. 24 (1868)
- Alan Bush
  - Piano Concerto, op. 18, with baritone and male choir in last movement (1938)
- Ferruccio Busoni
  - Piano Concerto in D, op. 17, for piano and string orchestra (1878)
  - Piano Concerto in C, op. 39 (1902-4), with male chorus
  - Indian Fantasy, op.44, for piano and orchestra
  - Konzert-Fantasie, op.32 (1888–89), for piano and orchestra
  - Introduction and Allegro, op.31a (1890), for piano and orchestra
- Garrett Byrnes
  - Concerto for Piano & Chamber Orchestra (2003)

=== C ===
- John Cage
  - Concerto for Prepared Piano and Orchestra (1950–51)
  - Concert for Piano and Orchestra (1957-1958)
- Robert Casadesus
  - Piano Concerto for two pianos
- Elliott Carter
  - Piano Concerto (1965)
- Alexis de Castillon
  - Piano Concerto in D major, op. 12
- Carlos Chávez
  - Piano Concerto (1938–40, revised 1969)
- Frédéric Chopin
  - Piano Concerto No. 1 in E minor, op. 11 (1830)
  - Piano Concerto No. 2 in F minor, op. 21 (1829–1830)
- Muzio Clementi
  - Piano Concerto in C major (ca. 1790)
- Aaron Copland
  - Piano Concerto (1926)
- John Corigliano
  - Piano Concerto (1968)
- Henry Cowell
  - Piano Concerto (1929)
- Carl Czerny
  - Piano Concerto in F, op. 28
  - Piano Concerto in C for four hands, op. 153
  - Piano Concerto in A minor, op. 214
  - 3 unpublished concertos, mentioned in Mandyczewski
  - Piano Concertino in C, op. 78
  - Piano Concertino in C, op. 210

=== D ===
- Luigi Dallapiccola
  - Piano Concerto
- Peter Maxwell Davies
  - Concerto for Piano and Orchestra (1997)
- Frederick Delius
  - Piano Concerto in C minor (1897–1906)
- Peter Dickinson (musician)
  - Piano Concerto (1984)
- Ernő Dohnányi
  - Piano Concerto No. 1 in E minor, op. 5 (1897-8)
  - Piano Concerto No. 2 in B minor, op. 42 (1946-7)
- Felix Draeseke
  - Piano Concerto in E♭, op. 36 (1885-6)
- Alexander Dreyschock
  - Piano Concerto in D minor, op. 137
- Frantisek Xaver Dusek
  - Piano concerto in D major
  - Piano Concerto in E♭ major
- Jan Ladislav Dussek
  - Thirteen solo piano concertos including
    - Piano Concerto in B♭ major, Op. 22, Craw 97
  - Concerto for Two Pianos in B♭ major, Op. 63 No. 10
- Antonín Dvořák
  - Piano Concerto in G minor, op. 33 (1876)
- George Dyson
  - Concerto Leggiero for Piano and String Orchestra

=== E ===
- Petr Eben
  - Piano Concerto (1960-1)
- Dennis Eberhard
  - Piano Concerto 'Shadow of the Swan'
- Sophie Carmen Eckhardt-Gramatté
  - Three piano concertos
- Ross Edwards
  - Piano Concerto in A (1982) ()
- Edward Elgar
  - Piano Concerto (incomplete, completed by Robert Walker) (begun 1913, sketches continue until 1934)
- Sven Einar Englund
  - Piano Concerto No. 1 (1955)
  - Piano Concerto No. 2 (1974)

()

- Gottfreid von Einem
  - Piano Concerto No. 1
- Keith Emerson
  - Piano Concerto No.1
- Eduard Erdmann
  - Piano Concerto (1928)
- A Eshpai
  - Piano Concerto No. 2

=== F ===
- Manuel de Falla - Concerto for harpsichord (1926)
- Ernest Farrar
  - Variations for Piano and Orchestra Op. 25
- Gabriel Fauré
  - Ballade for Piano and Orchestra
- Samuil Feinberg
  - Piano Concerto No. 1, op. 20 (1931)
  - Piano Concerto No. 2 (1945)
- Howard Ferguson
  - Piano Concerto in D (1951)
- John Field
  - Piano Concerto No. 1 in E♭, H. 27 (1799)
  - Piano Concerto No. 2 in A♭, H. 31 (1811)
  - Piano Concerto No. 3 in E♭, H. 32 (1811)
  - Piano Concerto No. 4 in E♭, H. 28 (1814, revised 1819)
  - Piano Concerto No. 5 in C, H. 39 (1817), l'Incedie par l'Orage
  - Piano Concerto No. 6 in C, H. 49 (1819, revised 1820)
  - Piano Concerto No. 7 in C minor, H. 58 (1822, revised 1822-32)
- Gerald Finzi
  - Grand Fantasia and Toccata for Piano and Orchestra Op. 38
  - Eclogue for Piano and Strings Op. 10
- Nicholas Flagello
  - Piano Concerto No. 1 (1950)
- Joseph Dillon Ford Concerto for Harpsichord (2006)
- Wilhelm Fortner
  - Mouvements for Piano and Orchestra (1954)
- Lukas Foss
  - Piano Concerto No. 1 (1939–43)
  - Piano Concerto No. 2 (1951)
- Jean Françaix
  - Concertino in G major (1932)
  - Concerto pour piano et orchestre (1936)
- César Franck
  - Piano Concerto No. 2 in B minor, Op. 11 (juvenilia, 1835)
  - Symphonic Variations (1885)
- Gunnar de Frumerie
  - Variations and Fugue for Piano and Orchestra (1932)
- Robert Fuchs
  - Piano Concerto in B♭ minor, Op. 27 (1879–80)
- Wilhelm Furtwängler
  - Symphonic Piano Concerto in B minor (1936-7)

=== G ===
- Kyle Gann
  - Sunken City (Concerto for piano and winds) (2007)
- Baldassarre Galuppi
  - 8 concerti for harpsichord (18th century)
- Roberto Gerhard
  - Piano Concerto (1951)
  - Concerto for Piano and Strings (1961)
  - Concerto for harpsichord, percussion and strings (mid 20th century)
- George Gershwin
  - Piano Concerto in F (1925)
- Alberto Ginastera
  - Piano Concerto No. 1, op. 28 (1961)
  - Piano Concerto No. 2 (1972)
- Peggy Glanville-Hicks
  - Etruscan Concerto
- Philip Glass
  - Piano Concerto No. 1 Tirol (2000)
  - Concerto for Harpsichord and Chamber Orchestra (2002)
  - Piano Concerto No. 2 After Lewis and Clark (2004)
- Alexander Glazunov
  - Piano Concerto No. 1 in F minor, op. 92 (1911)
  - Piano Concerto No. 2 in B, op. 100
- Radamés Gnattali
  - Piano Concerto No. 1 (1934)
  - Piano Concerto No. 2 (1936)
  - Piano Concerto No. 3 (1962)
  - Piano Concerto No. 4 (1966)
  - Piano Concerto No. 5 (Concerto Breve), for piano, flute, timpani and strings (1980)
  - Brasiliana No. 6, for piano and orchestra (1954)
  - Brasiliana No. 12, for two pianos and string orchestra (1968)
  - Concerto Carioca No.1, for piano, electric guitar and orchestra (1950)
  - Concerto Carioca No.2, for piano, double bass, drums and orchestra (1964)
  - Concerto Carioca No.3, for one or two pianos, electric guitar, double bass, accordion, drums and orchestra (1973)
  - Concerto Romântico for piano and orchestra (1949)
  - Concerto Seresteiro for piano, choro ensemble and orchestra (1983)
- Benjamin Godard
  - Piano Concerto No. 1 in A minor, op. 31 (1879)
  - Piano Concerto No. 2 in G minor, op. 148 (1899)
- Alexander Goedicke
  - Piano Concerto, op. 11 (1900)
- Hermann Goetz
  - Piano Concerto in E♭ (1861)
  - Piano Concerto in B♭, op. 18 (1867)
- Otar Gordeli
  - Piano concerto in C minor (1951)
  - Piano Concerto in C minor, op. 2 (1952)
- Henryk Górecki - Harpsichord Concerto (1980)
- Arthur de Greef
  - Piano Concerto No. 1 in C minor
  - Piano Concerto No. 2 in B♭ minor
- Edvard Grieg
  - Piano Concerto in A minor, op. 16 (1868)
- Ferde Grofé
  - Concerto for Piano and Orchestra in D (1958)
- Mozart Camargo Guarnieri
  - Piano Concerto No. 1 (1931)
  - Piano Concerto No. 2 (1946)
  - Piano Concerto No. 3 (1964)
  - Piano Concerto No. 4 (1968)
  - Piano Concerto No. 5 (1970)
  - Piano Concerto No. 6 (1987)
  - Variations on a Theme from the Northeast (1953)
  - Choro for Piano and Orchestra (1956)
  - Concertino for Piano and Chamber Orchestra (1961)
  - Seresta for Piano and Orchestra (1965)

=== H ===
- Reynaldo Hahn
  - Piano Concerto in E (1930)
- Howard Hanson
  - Piano Concerto in G, op. 36 (1948)
- Hamilton Harty
  - Piano Concerto in B minor (1922)
- Joseph Hallman
  - Rhapsody Concerto for Violin and Piano with Strings (2015)
- Georg Friedrich Händel
  - Organ concertos:
  - HWV 289 – Op. 4 No. 1 in G minor
  - HWV 290 – Op. 4 No. 2 in B♭ major
  - HWV 291 – Op. 4 No. 3 in G minor
  - HWV 292 – Op. 4 No. 4 in F major
  - HWV 293 – Op. 4 No. 5 in F major
  - HWV 294 – Op. 4 No. 6 in B♭ major
  - HWV 306 – Op. 7 No. 1 in B♭ major
  - HWV 307 – Op. 7 No. 2 in A major
  - HWV 308 – Op. 7 No. 3 in B♭ major
  - HWV 309 – Op. 7 No. 4 in D minor
  - HWV 310 – Op. 7 No. 5 in G minor
  - HWV 311 – Op. 7 No. 6 in B♭ major
- Joseph Haydn
  - Concerto in C, Hob. XVIII/1 (1756)
  - Concerto in D, Hob. XVIII/2 (1767)
  - Concerto in F, Hob. XVIII/3 (c. 1765)
  - Concerto in G, Hob. XVIII/4 (1770)
  - Concerto in C, Hob. XVIII/5 (before 1763)
  - Concerto in F, Hob. XVIII/7 (before 1766)
  - Concerto in C, Hob. XVIII/8 (1766)
  - Concerto in G, Hob. XVIII/9 (before 1767)
  - Concerto in C, Hob. XVIII/10 (1771)
  - Concerto in D, Hob. XVIII/11 (before 1782) - this is the one usually known as the Haydn concerto
- Christopher Headington
  - Piano Concerto
- Adolf von Henselt
  - Piano Concerto in F minor, Op. 16 (1839–47)
- Hans Werner Henze
  - Piano Concerto No. 1 (1950)
  - Piano Concerto No. 2 (1967)
- Henri Herz
  - Piano Concerto No. 1 in A, op. 34 (1828)
  - Piano Concerto No. 2 in C minor, op. 74 (1834)
  - Piano Concerto No. 3 in D minor, op. 87 (1835)
  - Piano Concerto No. 4 in E, op. 131 (1843)
  - Piano Concerto No. 5 in F minor, op. 180 (1854)
  - Piano Concerto No. 6 in A, op. 192 (1858), with chorus
  - Piano Concerto No. 7 in B minor, op. 207 (1864)
  - Piano Concerto No. 8 in A♭, op. 218 (1873)
- Paul Hindemith
  - Piano Concerto (1945)
- Alun Hoddinott
  - Concerto for Piano, Winds and Percussion, op. 19 (1961)
  - Concerto No. 2, op. 21 (1960)
  - Concerto No. 3, op. 44 (1966)
- Josef Hofmann
  - Chromatikon, for piano and orchestra
- Joseph Holbrooke
  - Piano Concerto No. 1, op. 52 The Song of Gwyn ap Nudd (1906-8)
  - Piano Concerto No. 2, op. 100 L'Orient
- Arthur Honegger
  - Concertino (1924)
- Herbert Howells
  - Piano Concerto No.2 in C minor (1925)
- Bertold Hummel
  - Divertimento capriccioso (after themes from the Opera Il Flaminio by G.B. Pergolesi) for harpsichord or piano and chamber orchestra (1958)
- Johann Nepomuk Hummel
  - Piano Concerto in A, s4 / WoO. 24 (1790s)
  - Piano Concerto in A, s5 / WoO. 24a (1790s)
  - Piano Concerto in C, op. 34a (1811)
  - Concertino in G, Op. 73
  - Piano Concerto in A minor, op. 85 (1821)
  - Piano Concerto in B minor, op. 89 (1819)
  - Piano Concerto in E, op. 110, Les Adieux (1826)
  - Piano Concerto in A♭, op. 113 (1830)
  - Piano Concerto in F, op. posth. 1 (1839)
- William Yeates Hurlstone
  - Piano Concerto in D
- Henry Holden Huss
  - Piano Concerto in B, op. 10

=== I ===
- John Ireland
  - Piano Concerto in E♭ (1930)
- Charles Ives
  - Emerson Concerto, reconstructed by David G. Porter from Ives' drafts of the Emerson Overture for Piano and Orchestra

=== J ===
- Gordon Jacob
  - Concerto for Three Hands
- André Jolivet
  - Piano Concerto (1950)

=== K ===
- Dmitry Kabalevsky
  - Piano Concerto No. 1 in A minor, op. 9 (1928)
  - Piano Concerto No. 2 in G minor, op. 23 (1935)
  - Piano Concerto No. 3 in D, op. 50 'Youth Concerto' (1952)
  - Piano Concerto No. 4 in C, op. 99 'Prague' (1975)
- Friedrich Wilhelm Michael Kalkbrenner
  - Piano Concerto No.1 in D minor, op. 61 (1823)
  - Piano Concerto No.2, op.85
  - Piano Concerto No.3
  - Piano Concerto No.4 in A♭ major, op. 127 (1835)
- Shigeru Kan-no
  - Piano Concerto No.1 (1997)
  - Piano Concerto No.2 (1999)
  - Piano Concerto No.3 (2006)
- Nikolai Kapustin
  - Concertino for piano and orchestra, op. 1 (1957)
  - Concerto for piano and orchestra No. 1, op. 2 (1961)
  - Concerto for piano and orchestra No. 2, op. 14 (1974)
  - Concerto for piano and orchestra No. 3, op. 48 (1985)
  - Concerto for piano and orchestra No. 4, op. 56 (1989)
  - Concerto for piano and orchestra No. 5, op. 72 (1993)
  - Concerto for piano and orchestra No. 6, op. 74 (1993)
- Alemdar Karamanov
  - Piano Concerto No. 3 'Ave Maria'
- Hugo Kaun (1863–1932)
  - Piano Concerto No.1 E♭ minor, op. 50
  - Piano Concerto No.2 C minor, op. 115 (1925)
- Aram Khachaturian
  - Concert-Rhapsody in D♭ (1967)
  - Piano Concerto in D♭ (1936)
- Tikhon Khrennikov
  - Piano Concerto No.1 in F, op. 1 (1933)
  - Piano Concerto No.2 in C, op. 21 (1972)
  - Piano Concerto No.3 in C, op. 28 (1983/84)
- Friedrich Kiel
  - Piano Concerto in B♭, op. 30 (1864)
- Wojciech Kilar
  - Piano Concerto (1997)
- Reginald King
  - Fantasie for Piano and Orchestra
- Charles Koechlin
  - Ballade for Piano and Orchestra
- Seigfreid Kohler
  - Piano Concerto Op. 46 (1971–72)
- Erich Wolfgang Korngold
  - Piano Concerto in C♯ for the left hand, Op. 17 (1923, commissioned by Paul Wittgenstein)
- Leopold Kozeluch
  - Concerto for Two Pianos in B♭ major
- Ernst Krenek
  - Piano Concerto No. 1 in F♯, op. 18 (1923)
  - Piano Concerto No. 2, op. 81 (1937)
  - Piano Concerto No. 3, op. 107 (1946)
  - Piano Concerto No. 4 (1950)
  - Concerto for Two Pianos (1951)
- Friedrich Kuhlau
  - Piano Concerto in C, op. 7 (1810)
- Theodor Kullak
  - Piano Concerto in C minor, op. 55 (1850)

=== L ===
- Helmut Lachenmann
  - Ausklang: Piano Concerto in F (1985)
- Edouard Lalo
  - Piano Concerto in F (1889)
- Constant Lambert
  - Concerto for piano and nine players (1931)
- Marcel Landowski
  - Piano Concerto No. 2
- Shawn Lane
  - Piano Concertino: Transformation of Themes (1992)
- Henri Lazarof
  - Tableaux (after Kandinsky) for Piano and Orchestra
- Dieter Lehnhoff
  - Piano Concerto No. 1 (2005)
  - Piano Concerto No. 2 (2007)
- Walter Leigh - Concertino for Harpsichord and String Orchestra (1934)
- Kenneth Leighton
  - Piano Concerto No. 1, op. 11 (1951)
  - Piano Concerto No. 2, op. 37 (1960)
  - Piano Concerto No. 3, op. 57 (1969)
- Artur Lemba
  - Piano Concerto No. 1 in G major (1905)
  - Piano Concerto No. 2 in e minor (1931)
  - Piano Concerto No. 3 in f minor (1945)
  - Piano Concerto No. 4 in B major (1955)
  - Piano Concerto No. 5 (1960)
- Theodor Leschtizky
  - Piano Concerto in C minor, Op. 9
- Lowell Liebermann
  - Piano Concerto No. 1, op. 12 (1983)
  - Piano Concerto No. 2, op. 36 (1992)
- Peter Lieberson
  - Piano Concerto
- György Ligeti
  - Piano Concerto (1988)
- Magnus Lindberg
  - Piano Concerto (1990–94)
- Dinu Lipatti
  - Concertino Op. 3
  - Romanian Dances for Piano and Orchestra
- Franz Liszt
  - Piano Concerto No. 1 in E♭, S. 124 (1835)
  - Piano Concerto No. 2 in A, S. 125 (1839)
  - Piano Concerto in E♭, op. posth., S. 125a
  - Fantasie über ungarische Volksmelodien, (Hungarian Fantasy) S.123
  - Totentanz, paraphrase on 'Dies Irae'
  - Grande symphonic Fantasie on themes from Berlioz's 'Lelio'
  - Fantasie on themes from Beethoven's 'Ruins of Athens'
  - Malediction for piano and string orchestra
  - Wanderer-Fantasie (from SChubert D970)
  - Polonaise brilliante in E♭ major (from Weber's 'L'Hilarite)
  - De Profundis
- Henry Charles Litolff
  - Concerto Symphonique No. 1 in D minor, now lost
  - Concerto Symphonique No. 2 in B minor, op. 22
  - Concerto Symphonique No. 3 in E♭, op. 45 (1846)
  - Concerto Symphonique No. 4 in D minor, op. 102
  - Concerto Symphonique No. 5 in C minor, op. 123 (1870)
- Nikolai Lopatnikoff
  - Concerto for two Pianos and Orchestra (1949–50)
- Bent Lorentzen
  - Piano Concerto
- George Lloyd
  - Piano Concerto No. 1 ('Scapegoat')
  - Piano Concerto No. 2
  - Piano Concerto No. 3
- Witold Lutosławski
  - Piano Concerto (1987)
- Sergei Lyapunov
  - Piano Concerto No. 1 in E♭ minor, op. 4 (1886)
  - Piano Concerto No. 2 in E, op. 38 (1909)

=== M ===
- Frederik Magle
  - Concerto for organ and orchestra "The Infinite Second" (1994)
- John McCabe
  - Piano Concerto No. 1, op. 43 (1966)
  - Piano Concerto No. 2
  - Piano Concetino (1968)
  - Piano Concerto No. 3, Dialogues (1976)
- Edward Alexander MacDowell
  - Piano Concerto No. 1 in A minor, op. 15 (1882)
  - Piano Concerto No. 2 in D minor, op. 23 (1885)
- Alexander Campbell Mackenzie
  - Scottish Concerto in G major, op. 55 (1897)
- Gian Francesco Malipiero
  - Six Piano Concertos (1934–1964)
  - Dialoghi VII (Concerto) for Two Pianos and Orchestra (1956)
- Otto Malling
  - Piano Concerto in C minor Op. 43 (1890)
- Frank Martin
  - Piano Concerto No. 1 in F minor (1934)
  - Harpsichord Concerto (1951–52)
  - Piano Concerto No. 2 (1968–69)
- Bohuslav Martinů
  - Piano Concerto No. 1 (1925)
  - Concertino for piano left hand and chamber orchestra, op. 173 (1926)
  - Piano Concerto No. 2 (1934)
  - Harpsichord Concerto (1935)
  - Concertino (1938)
  - Concerto for Two Pianos (1943)
  - Piano Concerto No. 3 (1948)
  - Piano Concerto No. 4 (1956, Incantations)
  - Piano Concerto No. 5 (1957, Fantasia concertante) (see )
- Giuseppe Martucci
  - Piano Concerto in D minor op. 40
  - Piano Concerto in B♭ minor op. 66 (1884-5)
- Joseph Marx
  - Romantisches Klavierkonzert in E
- Jules Massenet
  - Piano Concerto in E♭
- Nikolai Karlovich Medtner
  - Piano Concerto No. 1 in C minor, op. 33 (1914–18)
  - Piano Concerto No. 2 in C minor, op. 50 (1920–27)
  - Piano Concerto No. 3 in E minor, op. 60 (1940–43)
- Henryk Melcer
  - Concerto for Piano and Orchestra No. 1 in E minor (1895)
  - Concerto for Piano and Orchestra No. 2 in C minor (1898)
- Felix Mendelssohn
  - Piano Concerto in A minor (1822)
  - Concerto in E for two pianos (1823)
  - Concerto in A♭ for two pianos (1824)
  - Piano Concerto No. 1 in G minor, op. 25 (1831)
  - Piano Concerto No. 2 in D minor, op. 40 (1837)
- Peter Menin
  - Piano Concerto
- Giancarlo Menotti
  - Piano Concerto in F
- Ernest Meyer
  - Piano Concerto
- Francisco Mignone
  - Piano Concerto (1958)
  - Fantasia Brasileira No. 1 (1929)
  - Fantasia Brasileira No. 2 (1931)
  - Fantasia Brasileira No. 3 (1934)
  - Fantasia Brasileira No. 4 (1936)
  - Burlesca e Tocata (1958)
  - Concerto for piano, violin and orchestra (1966)
- Darius Milhaud
  - Piano Concerto No. 1, op. 127 (1933)
  - Piano Concerto No. 2, op. 225 (1941)
  - Concerto for 2 (or 3) Pianos, op. 228 (1941)
  - Piano Concerto No. 3, op. 270 (1946)
  - Piano Concerto No. 4, op. 295 (1949)
  - Concertino d'automne, for 2 pianos & 8 instruments, op. 309 (1951)
  - Piano Concerto No. 5, op. 346 (1955)
- Ronaldo Miranda
  - Piano Concerto (1983)
  - Concertino for piano and string orchestra (1986)
- E. J. Moeran
  - Rhapsody in F♯ minor for Piano and Orchestra (1943)
- Georg Matthias Monn - Harpsichord concerto in G minor, Harpsichord concerto in D major (18th Century)
- Xavier Montsalvatge
  - Concerto Breve
- Ignaz Moscheles
  - Piano Concerto No. 1 in F, op. 45 (1818)
  - Piano Concerto No. 2 in E♭, op. 56
  - Piano Concerto No. 3 in G minor, op. 58
  - Piano Concerto No. 4 in E, op. 64 (1823)
  - Piano Concerto No. 5 in C, op. 87 (1826–31)
  - Piano Concerto No. 6 in B♭, op. 90 Fantastique (1834)
  - Piano Concerto No. 7 in C minor, op. 93 Pathétique (1835)
  - Piano Concerto No. 8 in D, Pastorale, op. 96 (1838) - the orchestral parts for this concerto have been lost
- Mihaly Mosonyi
  - Piano Concerto
- Moritz Moszkowski
  - Piano Concerto in E minor, Op. 59
- Franz Xaver Mozart
  - Piano Concerto No. 1 in C major, Op. 14
  - PIano Concerto No. 2 in E♭ major Op. 25
- Wolfgang Amadeus Mozart - wrote twenty-seven numbered and three unnumbered concertos, of which Nos. 1–4 and K. 107 are arrangements of sonata movements by other composers.
  - Piano Concerto No. 1 in F, K. 37 (1767)
  - Piano Concerto No. 2 in B♭, K. 39 (1767)
  - Piano Concerto No. 3 in D, K. 40 (1767)
  - Piano Concerto No. 4 in G, K. 41 (1767)
  - Three Piano Concertos in D, in G and in E♭, K. 107 (1771 or 1765)
  - Piano Concerto No. 5 in D, K. 175 (1773)
  - Piano Concerto No. 6 in B♭, K. 238 (1776)
  - Concerto for 3 Pianos No. 7 in F major, K.242 (1776), the Lodron
  - Piano Concerto No. 8 in C, K. 246 (1776), the Lützow
  - Piano Concerto No. 9 in E♭, K. 271 (1777), the Jeunehomme
  - Concerto for Two Pianos in E♭, K. 365 (1779)
  - Piano Concerto No. 11 in F, K. 413 (1783)
  - Piano Concerto No. 12 in A, K. 414 (1782)
  - Piano Concerto No. 13 in C, K. 415 (1783)
  - Piano Concerto No. 14 in E♭, K. 449 (1784)
  - Piano Concerto No. 15 in B♭, K. 450 (1784)
  - Piano Concerto No. 16 in D, K. 451 (1784)
  - Piano Concerto No. 17 in G, K. 453 (1784)
  - Piano Concerto No. 18 in B♭, K. 456 (1784)
  - Piano Concerto No. 19 in F, K. 459 (1784)
  - Piano Concerto No. 20 in D minor, K. 466 (1785)
  - Piano Concerto No. 21 in C, K. 467 (1785)
  - Piano Concerto No. 22 in E♭, K. 482 (1785)
  - Piano Concerto No. 23 in A, K. 488 (1786)
  - Piano Concerto No. 24 in C minor, K. 491 (1786)
  - Piano Concerto No. 25 in C, K. 503 (1786)
  - Piano Concerto No. 26 in D, K. 537 (1788), the Coronation
  - Piano Concerto No. 27 in B♭, K. 595 (1791)
  - Concert Rondo No. 1 in D, K. 382 (1782)
  - Concert Rondo No. 2 in A, K. 386 (1782)
- Dominic Muldowney
  - Piano Concerto (1982)

=== N ===
- Eduard Nápravník
  - Concerto symphonique in A minor Op 27 (1877)
- Dieter Nowka
  - Piano Concerto No. 1 for the left hand op. 71 (1963)
  - Piano Concerto No.2 (1972)
- Michael Nyman
  - The Piano Concerto

=== O ===
- Hisato Ohzawa
  - Piano Concerto No. 3 'Kamikaze' (1938)
- Leo Ornstein
  - Piano Concerto (1925)

=== P ===
- Ignacy Paderewski
  - Piano Concerto in A minor, op. 17 (1888)
- Giovanni Paisiello
  - Concerto for Piano and Orchestra, No 1 in C major
  - Concerto for Piano and Orchestra, No 2 in F major
  - Concerto for Piano and Orchestra, No 3 in A major
  - Concerto for Piano and Orchestra, No 4 in G minor
  - Concerto for Piano and Orchestra, No 5 in D major
  - Concerto for Piano and Orchestra, No 6 in B♭ major
  - Concerto for Piano and Orchestra, No 7 in A major
  - Concerto for Piano and Orchestra, No 8 in C major
- Selim Palmgren
  - Piano Concerto No. 1 in G minor, op. 13 (1903)
  - Piano Concerto No. 2, op.33 'The River' (1913)
  - Piano Concerto No. 3 in F major, op.41 'Metamorphoses' (1915)
  - Piano Concerto No. 4, op.85 'April' (1926)
  - Piano Concerto No. 5 in A major, op.99 (1941)
- Andrzej Panufnik
  - Piano Concerto (1964, recomposed 1972)
- Hubert Parry
  - Piano Concerto in F♯
- Krzysztof Penderecki
  - Piano Concerto (2002)
- Vincent Persichetti
  - Concertino, op. 16 (1941)
  - Piano Concerto, op. 90 (1962)
- Hans Pfitzner
  - Piano Concerto in E♭, Op. 31 (1922)
- Gabriel Pierné
  - Piano Concerto in C minor, op. 12 (1886)
- Walter Piston
  - Concertino (1937)
  - Concerto for Two Pianos and Orchestra (1964)
- Ildebrando Pizzetti
  - Canti Della Stagione Alta (Concerto) (1930)
- Manuel Ponce
  - Piano Concerto (1912)
- Francis Poulenc
  - Concerto for Two Pianos (1932)
  - Piano Concerto (1949)
  - Concert champêtre (1927–28) for harpsichord and orchestra (also in version for piano and orchestra)
- André Previn
  - Piano Concerto (1986)
- Sergei Prokofiev
  - Piano Concerto No. 1 in D♭, op. 10 (1912)
  - Piano Concerto No. 2 in G minor, Op. 16 (1913, rewritten 1923)
  - Piano Concerto No. 3 in C, Op. 26 (1917–21), his best known
  - Piano Concerto No. 4 in B♭, op. 53 (1931), for the left hand (written for Paul Wittgenstein)
  - Piano Concerto No. 5 in G, op. 55 (1932)
  - Piano Concerto No. 6 (1953, incomplete), for two pianos and strings

=== R ===
- Sergei Rachmaninoff
  - Piano Concerto No. 1 in F♯ minor, Op. 1 (1891)
  - Piano Concerto No. 2 in C minor, Op. 18 (1901)
  - Piano Concerto No. 3 in D minor, Op. 30 (1909)
  - Piano Concerto No. 4 in G minor, Op. 40 (1926)
  - Rhapsody on a Theme of Paganini, Op. 43 (1934)
  - Concerto Élégiaque, Op. 9b (an orchestration of Rachmaninoff's Trio élégiaque No. 2 by Alan Kogosowski)
  - Suite No. 1 (Fantasy), Op. 5 (orch. R. Harkness)
  - Suite No. 2, Op. 17, Op. 17 (orch. L. Holby)
- Joachim Raff
  - Piano Concerto in C minor, Op. 185 (1873)
- Einojuhani Rautavaara
  - Piano Concerto No. 1, Op. 45 (1969)
  - Piano Concerto No. 2 (1989)
  - Piano Concerto No. 3 'Gift of Dreams' (1998), written for pianist Vladimir Ashkenazy
- Maurice Ravel
  - Piano Concerto in G (1931)
  - Piano Concerto in D for the Left Hand (1931, written for Paul Wittgenstein)
- Alan Rawsthorne
  - Piano Concerto No. 1 (1943)
  - Piano Concerto No. 2 (1951)
  - Concerto for Two Pianos and Orchestra (1968)
- Max Reger
  - Piano Concerto in F minor, Op. 114 (1910)
- Carl Reinecke
  - Piano Concerto No. 1 in F♯ minor, Op. 72 (1860)
  - Piano Concerto No. 2 in E minor, Op. 120 (1872)
  - Piano Concerto No. 3 in C, Op. 144 (1877)
  - Piano Concerto No. 4 in B minor, Op. 254 (1901)
- Ottorino Respighi
  - Piano Concerto in A minor, P. 40 (1902)
  - Concerto in Modo Misolidio, P. 145 (1925)
- Josef Rheinberger
  - Piano Concerto in A♭, op. 94 (1876)
- Nikolai Rimsky-Korsakov
  - Piano Concerto in C♯ minor, Op. 30 (1882)
- Joaquín Rodrigo
  - Concerto Heroic (1942)
- Julius Röntgen
  - Piano Concerto in G minor (1873)
  - Piano Concerto in D major, Op. 18 (1879)
  - Piano Concerto in D minor (1887)
  - Piano Concerto in F major (1906)
  - Piano Concerto in E major (1929)
  - Two Piano Concertos: No. 1 in E minor and No. 2 in C major (1929/30)
- Ned Rorem
  - Piano Concerto No. 2 (1950)
  - Concerto in Six Movements
  - Piano Concerto No. 4 for the left hand (1993)
- Nino Rota
  - Fantasy for piano and orchestra on twelve notes from "non si pasce di cibo mortale chi si pasce di cibo celeste" from the second act of Mozart's Don Giovanni
  - Concerto soiree for piano and orchestra
  - Concerto in E minor for piano and orchestra (piccolo mondo antico)
  - Concerto in C major for piano and orchestra
- Albert Roussel
  - Concerto in C, Op. 36 (1927)
- Alec Rowley
  - Concerto for Piano, Strings and Percussion, Op. 49 (1938)
- Edmund Rubbra
  - Sinfonia Concertante, Op. 38 (1936, revised 1943)
  - Piano Concerto in G, Op. 85 (1956)
- Anton Rubinstein
  - Piano Concerto (1847), 1 movement only
  - Piano Concerto in C (1849), revised as Octet in D, Op. 9 (1856)
  - Piano Concerto No. 1 in E minor, Op. 25 (1850)
  - Piano Concerto No. 2 in F, Op. 35 (1851)
  - Piano Concerto No. 3 in G, Op. 45 (1853-4)
  - Piano Concerto No. 4 in D minor, Op. 70 (1864)
  - Piano Concerto No. 5 in E♭, Op. 94 (1874)
  - Caprice russe, Op. 102

=== S ===
- P. Peter Sacco
  - Piano Concerto No. 1 (1964)
- Camille Saint-Saëns
  - Piano Concerto No. 1 in D, op. 17 (1858)
  - Piano Concerto No. 2 in G minor, op. 22 (1868)
  - Piano Concerto No. 3 in E♭, op. 29 (1869)
  - Piano Concerto No. 4 in C minor, op. 44 (1873)
  - Piano Concerto No. 5 in F, op. 103 (1895), the Egyptian
  - 'Africa' op.89, for piano and orchestra
  - 'Wedding cake' op.76, caprice-valse for piano and orchestra
  - Allegro appassionato op.70, for piano and orchestra
  - Rhapsodie d'Auvergne, op. 73
- Antonio Salieri
  - Piano Concerto in C
  - Piano Concerto in B♭
- Siegfried Salomon
  - Piano Concerto in A minor Op. 54 (1947)
- Claudio Santoro
  - Música Concertante (1944)
  - Piano Concerto No. 1 (1951/2)
  - Piano Concerto No. 2 (1958/9)
  - Piano Concerto No. 3 (1960)
  - Intermitências II (1967)
  - Intermitências III (1968)
  - Fantasia Sul América for piano and orchestra (1983)
- Emil von Sauer
  - Piano Concerto No. 1 in E minor
  - Piano Concerto No. 2 in C minor
- Franz Xaver Scharwenka
  - Piano Concerto No. 1 in B♭ minor, op. 32 (1877)
  - Piano Concerto No. 2 in C minor, op. 56 (1880)
  - Piano Concerto No. 3 in C♯ minor, op. 80 (1898)
  - Piano Concerto No. 4 in F minor, op. 82
- Hans Bronsart von Schellendorff
  - Piano Concerto in F♯ minor Op. 10
- Franz Schmidt
  - Concertante Variationen über ein Thema von Beethoven (1923)
  - Piano Concerto No. 2 in E♭ for the Left Hand (1934)
- Alfred Schnittke
  - Piano Concerto (No.1), for piano and orchestra (1960)
  - Piano Concerto (No.2), for piano and chamber orchestra (1964)
  - Piano Concerto (No.3), for piano and strings (1979)
  - Piano Concerto (No.4), for one piano four hands and chamber orchestra (1988)
- Arnold Schoenberg
  - Piano Concerto (1942)
- Ervin Schulhoff
  - Concerto for Piano and Small Orchestra
  - Piano Concerto Op. 11
- William Schuman
  - Piano Concerto (1930, rev. 1942)
- Clara Schumann
  - Piano Concerto in A minor, op.7 (1832-3)
- Robert Schumann
  - Piano Concerto in A minor, op. 54 (1845)
- Ludvig Schytte
  - Piano Concerto in C♯ minor Op. 28 (c.1884)
- Alexander Scriabin
  - Piano Concerto in F♯ minor, op. 20 (1897)
  - Fantasy for Piano and Orchestra (1887–88)
- Peter Sculthorpe
  - Piano Concerto (1983)
- Joaquim Serra
  - Variations for Piano and Orchestra
- Roger Sessions
  - Piano Concerto (1956)
- Giovanni Sgambati
  - Piano Concerto in G minor, Op. 15 (1885)
- Dmitri Shostakovich
  - Piano Concerto No. 1 in C minor, op. 35 (1933), also includes a part for solo trumpet
  - Piano Concerto No. 2 in F, op. 102 (1957)
- Aleksandr Shymko
  - Piano Concerto No.1 (2001-2002)
  - Piano Concerto No.2 (2006-2007)
- Sheila Silver
  - Concerto for Piano and Orchestra (1996)
- Rudolph Simonsen
  - Piano Concerto in F minor (1915)
- Christian Sinding
  - Piano Concerto in D♭, op. 6 (1887–89, revised 1901)
- Leo Smit
  - Piano Concerto 1937
- Michael Staley
  - Aurora, for Piano and Chamber Orchestra(1976)
  - Scenery of Pasts, 1993 Trio - Piano, Flute, Cello
  - Picasso Reflections, Piano and Chamber Group(2007)
  - American Rhapsody (2009)
- Charles Stanford
  - Piano Concerto No. 1 in G, op. 59
  - Piano Concerto No. 2 in C minor, op. 126
  - Piano Concerto No. 3, op. 171 (1919)
- Bernhard Stavenhagen
  - Piano Concerto in B minor, op. 4 (1894)
- Wilhelm Stenhammar
  - Piano Concerto No. 1 in B♭ minor, op. 1 (1893)
  - Piano Concerto No. 2 in D minor, op. 23 (1905–07)
- Zygmunt Stojowski
  - Piano Concerto No. 1 in F♯ minor, op. 3 (1890)
  - Piano Concerto No. 2 in A♭, op. 32 (1909–10)
- Igor Stravinsky
  - Concerto for Piano and Wind Instruments (1923-4)
  - Capriccio for Piano and Orchestra
  - Movements for Piano and Orchestra
- Stjepan Šulek
  - Piano Concerto No. 1 (1949)
  - Piano Concerto No. 2 (1952)
  - Piano Concerto No. 3 (1970)

=== T ===
- Emil Tabakov
  - Concerto for Piano and Orchestra
- Josef Tal
  - Concerto No. 1 for piano & orchestra (1945)
  - Concerto No. 2 for piano & orchestra (1953)
  - Concerto No. 3 for tenor, piano and chamber orchestra (1956)
- Alexander Tansman
  - Suite for Two Pianos and Orchestra (1928)
- Svend Erik Tarp
  - Piano Concerto op 39 (1942–43)
- Boris Tchaikovsky
  - Piano Concerto in C Minor, 1971
- Pyotr Ilyich Tchaikovsky
  - Piano Concerto No. 1 in B♭, op. 23 (1874)
  - Piano Concerto No. 2 in G, op. 44 (1880)
  - Piano Concerto No. 3 in E♭, op. 75 (1893)
- Alexander Tcherepnin
  - Piano Concerto No. 1, Op. 12
  - Piano Concerto No. 2, Op. 26
  - Piano Concerto No. 3, Op. 48
  - Piano Concerto No. 4 ('Fantasie')
  - Piano Concerto No. 5, Op. 96
  - Piano Concerto No. 6, Op. 99
- Sigismund Thalberg
  - Piano Concerto in F minor, Op.5
- Ferdinand Thieriot (1838–1919)
  - Piano Concerto No. 1, in B♭ (1885)
  - Piano Concerto No. 2, C-minor (1904)
- Ludwig Thuille
  - Piano Concerto in D-major (1882)
- Michael Tippett
  - Piano Concerto (1955)
- Václav Tomášek
  - Piano Concerto in C major
  - Piano Concerto in E♭ major
- Donald Francis Tovey
  - Piano Concerto in A, op. 15 (1903)
- Geirr Tveitt
  - Piano Concerto No. 1 in F, op. 1 (1927)
  - Piano Concerto No. 2
  - Piano Concerto No. 3
  - Piano Concerto No. 4 'Aurora Borealis', op. 130 (1947)
  - Piano Concerto No. 5, op. 156 (1954)

=== U ===
- Viktor Ullmann
  - Klavierkonzert, Op.25 (1939)
- Galina Ustvolskaya
  - Concerto for Piano, String Orchestra and Timpani

=== V ===
- Ralph Vaughan Williams
  - Piano Concerto (1933 - also exists in a version for two pianos and orchestra of 1946)
- José Vianna da Motta
  - Piano Concerto in A (1886-7)
- Heitor Villa-Lobos
  - Piano Concerto No. 1 (1945)
  - Piano Concerto No. 2 (1948)
  - Piano Concerto No. 3 (1952–57)
  - Piano Concerto No. 4 (1952)
  - Piano Concerto No. 5 (1954)
  - Suite for piano and orchestra (1913)
  - Momoprecoce, fantasy for piano and orchestra (1929)
  - Choros No.11 (1928)
  - Bachianas Brasileiras No.3 (1938)
- Carl Vine
  - Piano Concerto (1997)
- Antonio Vivaldi
  - Concerto for harpsichord, strings and basso continuo in A major, RV 780 (RV 546 with violin and cello instead of harpsichord)

=== W ===
- William Walton
  - Sinfonia Concertante (1928, revised 1944)
- Carl Maria von Weber
  - Piano Concerto No. 1 in C, J. 98 (1810)
  - Piano Concerto No. 2 in E♭, J. 155 (1815)
  - Konzertstück for Piano and Orchestra in F minor, Op. 79, J.282
- Jacob Weinberg
  - Piano Concerto No. 2 in C major (1944)
- Judith Weir
  - Piano Concerto
- Charles-Marie Widor
  - Piano Concerto No. 1 in F minor, Op. 39 (1880)
  - Piano Concerto No. 2 in C, Op. 77 (1905)
- Jozef Wieniawski
  - Piano Concerto in G minor, Op. 20 (1859)
- Thomas Wilson
  - Piano Concerto
- Haydn Wood
  - Piano Concerto in D minor (1909)

=== X ===
- Iannis Xenakis
  - Erikhthon
  - Keqrops
  - Synaphaï

=== Y ===
- Richard Yardumian
  - Passacaglia, Recitative and Fugue, a concerto for piano and orchestra (premiered 1958, Rudolf Firkušný, Philadelphia Orchestra, conducted by Eugene Ormandy.)
- Yin Chengzong et al.
  - Yellow River Piano Concerto (arrangement of themes from Xian Xinghai's Yellow River Cantata)

=== Z ===
- Efrem Zimbalist
  - Piano Concerto in E♭ (composed 1953 for William Kapell, destroyed in the air crash in which the pianist died, reconstructed by the composer)

== Concertos for keyboard and other solo instrument(s) ==
- Johann Sebastian Bach
  - BWV 1050 - Brandenburg concerto no.5 in D major, for harpsichord, flute, violin and strings (1721)
  - BWV 1044 for harpsichord, violin, flute and strings in A minor, 1st and 3rd movements after his Prelude and Fugue in A minor for harpsichord, BWV 894 and second movement after the second movement from his trio sonata in D minor for organ, BWV 527 (1740)
- Ludwig van Beethoven
  - Triple concerto, op. 56 (1804-5)
- Elliott Carter
  - Double Concerto for Harpsichord and Piano with Two Chamber Orchestras (1961)
- Joseph Haydn
  - Concerto in F, Hob. XVIII/6, for piano, violin and strings (before 1766)
- Johann Nepomuk Hummel
  - Double Concerto in G, Op. 17 for piano and violin
- Vincent d'Indy
  - Triple Concerto for Piano, Flute, Cello and String Orchestra, op. 89 (1927)
- Frank Martin
  - Petite Symphonie Concertante for piano, harp, harpsichord and two string orchestras (1945)
- Bohuslav Martinů
  - Concertino (1933) for piano, violin, cello and string orchestra
- Felix Mendelssohn
  - Concerto for Violin and Piano in D minor (1823)
- Olivier Messiaen
  - Concert à Quatre (1990–91, completed Loriod and Benjamin)
- Wolfgang Amadeus Mozart
  - Concerto for Violin, Piano, and Orchestra K. 315f (fragment, 1778)
- Antonio Vivaldi
  - Concerto for 3 violins, oboe, 2 recorders, 2 viole all'inglese, chalumeau, 2 cellos, 2 harpsichords, 2 trumpets, strings and basso continuo in C major, RV 555

== Other concertante works for keyboard and orchestra ==
- Richard Addinsell
  - Warsaw Concerto, from the movie Dangerous Moonlight
- Isaac Albéniz
  - Rapsodia española, op. 70 (1887)
- Anton Arensky
  - Fantasia on Russian Folksongs, Op. 48
- Kees van Baaren
  - Concertino for Piano and Orchestra (1934)
- Mily Balakirev
  - Grande fantaisie on Russian folksongs, Op. 4 (1852)
- Ludwig van Beethoven
  - Fantasy in C minor for Piano, Chorus, and Orchestra, Op. 80 (Choral Fantasy) (1808)
- Adolphe Biarant
  - Rapsodie Wallone (1910)
- Ernest Bloch
  - Scherzo fantastique (1948)
- Felix Blumenfeld
  - Allegro de concert in A major, Op. 7 (1889)
- Henriëtte Bosmans
  - Concertino for Piano and Orchestra (1928)
- Benjamin Britten
  - Diversions on a Theme for Left Hand and Orchestra, Op. 21 (1940), for Paul Wittgenstein
  - Scottish Ballad, op. 26, for two pianos and orchestra (1941)
- Ignaz Brüll
  - Rhapsodie in D minor, op. 65 (1892)
  - Andante and Allegro, op. 88
- Ferruccio Busoni
  - Introduction et scherzo (1882-4)
  - Konzert-Fantasie, Op. 29 (1888-9)
  - Konzertstück in D, Op. 31a (1890)
  - Indian Fantasy, Op. 44 (1913)
  - Romanza e scherzoso, Op. 54 (1921), published together with Op. 31a as Concertino
- Alfredo Casella
  - Scarlattiana, divertimento su musiche di Domenico Scarlatti per pianoforte e piccola orchestra, Op.44 (1926)
- Joseph Canteloube
  - Pièces françaises (1934-5)
- Cécile Chaminade
  - Konzertstück in C♯ minor, Op. 40 (1896?, fp 1908)
- Frédéric Chopin
  - Variations on "Là ci darem la mano" (from Mozart's Don Giovanni), Op. 2 (1827)
  - Fantasy on Polish Airs, Op. 13 (1828)
  - Rondo à la Krakowiak, Op. 14 (1828)
  - Andante spianato et grande polonaise brillante, Op. 22 (1830-1)
- Claude Debussy
  - Printemps, L. 61 (1887), symphonic suite for choir, piano, and orchestra
  - Fantaisie, L. 73 (1889–90)
- Ernő Dohnányi
  - Variations on a Nursery Song, Op. 25 (1913)
- Marcel Dupré
  - Fantasie, Op. 8 (1919?)
- Manuel de Falla
  - Noches en los jardines de España (Nights in the Gardens of Spain, 1916)
- Gabriel Fauré
  - Ballade in F♯, op. 19 (1881)
  - Fantaisie in G, op. 111 (1919)
- John Field
  - Fantaisie sur un air favorite de mon ami N.P. in A minor, H. 4A (1822), orchestral part now lost
  - Serenade in B♭, H. 37
  - Grande pastorale in E, H. 54A (1832), orchestral part now lost
- Gerald Finzi
  - Eclogue, op. 10
  - Grand Fantasia and Toccata, op. 38
- César Franck
  - Variations brillantes sur la ronde favorite de Gustave III (1834-5)
  - Les Djinns, FWV 45 (1884), symphonic poem
  - Symphonic Variations, FWV 46 (1885)
- George Gershwin
  - Rhapsody in Blue (1924)
  - Second Rhapsody (1934)
  - Variations on "I Got Rhythm" (1934)
- Benjamin Godard
  - Introduction and Allegro, op. 49 (1880)
- Alexander Goedicke
  - Konzertstück in D, op. 11 (1900)
- Louis Moreau Gottschalk
  - Grand Tarantelle, op. 67 (1868)
- Charles Gounod
  - Fantaisie sur l'hymne national russe (1886)
  - Suite Concertante in A (1890)
- Enrique Granados
  - Suite de navidad (1914-5), arranged from opera La cieguecita de Betania
- Adolf von Henselt
  - Variations de Concert on Quand je quittai la Normandie from Meyerbeer's Robert le Diable, op.11
- Paul Hindemith
  - Klaviermusik, Op. 29 (1923, for left hand only)
  - Kammermusik II, concerto for piano and twelve solo instruments, op. 36/1 (1924)
  - Concert Music for Piano, Brass and Two Harps, op. 49 (1930)
  - The Four Temperaments (1940)
- Johann Nepomuk Hummel
  - Rondeau Brillant in A, op. 56
  - Rondo Brillant on a Russian Folk Theme, op. 98 (1822)
  - Variations Brillantes "Das Fest der Handwerken", op. 115 (1830)
  - Oberons Zauberhorn — Grosse Fantasie, op. 116 (1829)
  - Gesellschafts Rondo in D, op. 117
  - Le Retour de Londres — Grand Rondeau Brillant, op. 127 (1830)
- John Ireland
  - Legend (1933)
- Leoš Janáček
  - Concertino (1925)
  - Capriccio for piano left hand, flute and brass ensemble 'Vzdor' (1926)
- Robert Kahn
  - Konzertstücke, op.74 (1920)
- Nikolai Kapustin
  - Toccata for piano and orchestra, op. 8 (1964)
  - Intermezzo for piano and orchestra, op. 13 (1968)
  - Nocturne in G major for piano and orchestra, op. 16 (1972)
  - Etude for piano and orchestra, op. 19 (1974)
  - Nocturne for piano and orchestra, op. 20 (1974)
  - Concert Rhapsody for piano and orchestra, op. 25 (1976)
  - Scherzo for piano and orchestra, op. 29 (1978)
- Nigel Keay
  - Diffractions for Piano and Orchestra (1987)
- Aram Khachaturian
  - Concert-Rhapsody in D♭, op. 102 (1967)
- Ton de Leeuw
  - Danses sacrées (1990)
- Franz Liszt
  - Grande Fantaisie Symphonique "Lelio", S. 120
  - Malédiction, S. 121
  - De Profundis - Psaume instrumental, S. 121a
  - Fantasy on a Theme from Beethoven's The Ruins of Athens, S. 122 (1848–52)
  - Fantasy on Hungarian Folk Songs, S. 123 (1852)
  - Totentanz, S. 126 (1838–49, revised 1853 and 1859)
  - Grand solo de concert, S. 365 (prepared by Leslie Howard)
  - Concerto pathétique in E minor, S. 365a
  - Hexaméron, S. 365b (orch. competed by Leslie Howard)
  - Transcription of Schubert's Wanderer Fantasy, S. 366 (1850–51)
  - Transcription of Weber's Polonaise brillante, S. 367 (1850–51)
  - Rapsodie espagnole, S. 254 (orch. Busoni)
- Witold Lutosławski
  - Variations on a Theme by Paganini (1978, orig. written 1941 for two pianos)
- Sergei Lyapunov
  - Rhapsody on Ukrainian Themes, op. 28
- Frederik Magle
  - Symphonic "Lego" Fantasia for piano and orchestra (1995–96)
- Bohuslav Martinů
  - Toccata e due Canzoni (1946)
- Joseph Marx
  - Castelli Romani (1930)
- Felix Mendelssohn
  - Capriccio Brillant in B minor, op. 22 (1832)
  - Rondo Brillant in E♭ major, op. 29 (1834)
  - Serenade and Allegro giocoso in B minor, op. 43 (1838)
- Sophie Menter
  - Hungarian Gypsy Melodies (with possible help from F. Liszt who is Menter's teacher, orchestrated by P. I. Tchaikovsky in 1892) (1885)
- Darius Milhaud
  - Ballade, op. 61 (1920)
  - 5 Études, op. 63 (1920)
  - Le Carnaval d'Aix, op. 83b (1926)
  - Fantaisie pastorale, op. 188 (1938)
  - Suite, op. 300, for 2 (or 3) Pianos & Orchestra (1950)
  - Suite concertante, op. 278b (1952)
- Ignaz Moscheles
  - Recollections of Ireland, op. 69
  - Anticipations of Scotland: A Grand Fantasia, Op. 70
- Wolfgang Amadeus Mozart
  - Concert Rondo No. 1 in D, K. 382 (1782)
  - Concert Rondo No. 2 in A, K. 386 (1782)
- Eduard Nápravník
  - Fantaisie russe in B minor Op 39 (1881)
- Ignacy Paderewski
  - Fantaisie Polonaise, Op. 19 (1893)
- Gabriel Pierné
  - Fantaisie-Ballet in B♭, op.6 (1885)
  - Scherzo-Caprice in D, op. 25 (1890)
  - Poème Symphonique in D minor, op. 37 (1903)
- Sergei Rachmaninoff
  - Rhapsody on a Theme of Paganini in A minor, Op. 43 (1934)
- Joachim Raff
  - Ode to Spring, op. 76 (1857)
  - Suite in E♭, op. 200
- Carl Reinecke
  - Konzertstück in G minor, op. 33 (1848)
- Ottorino Respighi
  - Fantasia slava in G, P. 50 (1903)
  - Toccata, P. 156 (1928)
- Anton Rubinstein
  - Piano Fantasia in C, op. 84 (1869)
  - Konzertstück in A♭, op. 113
  - Russian Capriccio, op. 120 (1878)
- Frederic Rzewski
  - A Long Time Man (24 variations on the prison song "It Makes a Long Time Man Feel Bad") (1979)
- Camille Saint-Saëns
  - Allegro appassionato, op. 70 (1884)
  - Rapsodie d'Auvergne, op. 73 (1884)
  - "Wedding Cake" - Caprice-Valse, Op. 76 (1885)
  - Le carnaval des animaux (2 pianos; 1886)
  - "Africa" Fantaisie, op. 89 (1891)
- Ernest Schelling
  - Suite Fantastique, op. 7
  - Impressions from an Artist's Life (1913)
- Robert Schumann
  - Introduction and Allegro Appassionato, op. 92
  - Introduction and Allegro, op. 134
- Alexander Scriabin
  - Fantaziya in A minor (1889)
- Charles Stanford
  - Concert Variations on "Down among the Deadmen", op. 71 (1898)
- Zygmunt Stojowski
  - Rhapsodie symphonique, op. 23 (1904)
- Richard Strauss
  - Burleske in D minor (1885–86)
  - Parergon zur Sinfonia Domestica, op. 73 (piano left-hand; 1924–25)
  - Panathenänzug, op. 74 (1926–27)
- Igor Stravinsky
  - Capriccio for Piano and Orchestra (1928-9)
  - Five Movements for Piano and Orchestra (1958-9)
- Pyotr Ilyich Tchaikovsky
  - Concert Fantasy, op. 56 (1891)
  - Andante and Finale in B♭, op. 79 (1893)
- Michael Tippett
  - Fantasy on a Theme by Handel (1942)
- Geirr Tveitt
  - Variations on a Folksong from Hardanger for two pianos and orchestra (1949)
- Ralph Vaughan Williams
  - Fantasia (Quasi Variazione) on the "Old 104th" Psalm Tune (1949)
- Louis Vierne
  - Poème, op. 50 (1926?)
- José Vianna da Motta
  - Fantasia Dramática
- Heitor Villa-Lobos
  - Chôros No. 8 (1925)
  - Chôros No. 9 (1928)
  - Mômo Precoce (1929)
  - Bachianas Brasileiras No. 3 (1938)
- Carl Maria von Weber
  - Konzertstück in F minor, op. 79 (1821)
- Charles Marie Widor
  - Fantaisie in A♭, op. 62 (1892)

== Works for orchestra or large ensemble with prominent solo keyboard part ==
- Leonard Bernstein
  - Symphony No. 2 The Age of Anxiety (1948, rev. 1965), after W. H. Auden
- Morton Feldman
  - Piano and Orchestra (1975)
- Hans Werner Henze
  - Tristan, preludes for piano, electronic tapes and orchestra (1973)
  - Requiem for piano and chamber orchestra (1990)
- Vincent d'Indy
  - Symphonie sur un chant montagnard français, op. 25 (1886)
  - Jour d'Été à la Montagne, Rhapsody for piano and orchestra, op. 61 (1905)
- Frederik Magle
  - Cantabile (symphonic suite) (2004-2009)
- Bohuslav Martinů
  - Double Concerto for 2 String Orchestras, Piano and Timpani (1938)
  - Sinfonietta Giocosa (1940)
  - Sinfonietta La Jolla (1950)
- Olivier Messiaen
  - Trois petites Liturgies de la Présence Divine (1943–44)
  - Turangalîla-Symphonie (1946–48)
  - Réveil des Oiseaux (1953)
  - Oiseaux exotiques (1955–56)
  - Sept haïkaï (1962)
  - Couleurs de la Cité Céleste (1963)
  - La Transfiguration de Notre Seigneur Jésus (1965–69), for solo piano, solo cello, solo flute, solo clarinet, solo xylorimba, solo vibraphone, large 10-part choir and large orchestra
  - Des Canyons aux étoiles... (1971–74)
  - Un vitrail et des oiseaux (1986)
  - La ville d'En-haut (1987)
- Arvo Pärt
  - Lamentate for piano and orchestra (2002)
- Francis Poulenc
  - Aubade (1929) "choreographic concerto" for piano and eighteen instruments.
- Alexander Scriabin
  - Prométhée, le poème du feu, op. 60 (1909–10)
- Igor Stravinsky
  - Petrushka
- Karol Szymanowski
  - Symphony No. 4, Symphonie Concertante
- Toru Takemitsu
  - Arc (1963)
  - Asterism (1968)
  - Quatrain for violin, clarinet, cello, piano soloists and orchestra (1975)
- John Tavener
  - Palintropos (1978)
- Iannis Xenakis
  - Synaphai (Connexities) (1969)
  - Erikhthon (1974)
  - Keqrops (1986)

== Similar works ==
- Elliott Carter - Double Concerto (1959–61, for harpsichord, piano and orchestra)
- Frank Martin - Petite symphonie concertante for harp, harpsichord, piano and double string orchestra.
- Alfred Schnittke - Concerto Grosso No. 1 (1977, for two violins, harpsichord, prepared piano and orchestra)

Concerti have been written where the piano is not the only solo instrument. A famous example is the Triple concerto (for piano, violin, cello and orchestra) by Beethoven.

There also exist a number of compositions for piano and orchestra which treat the piano as a solo instrument while not being piano concerti. Examples of such works include George Gershwin's Rhapsody in Blue, Rachmaninov's Rhapsody on a Theme of Paganini and Liszt's Totentanz. The last two of these works are each in variation form, based on the 24th Caprice for solo violin by Niccolò Paganini and the ancient Gregorian Dies Irae chant respectively.

There are also works written for orchestra or large ensemble requiring a solo pianist, such as Olivier Messiaen's Des canyons aux étoiles... and Turangalîla-Symphonie, and Karol Szymanowski's 4th Symphony.

Composers also occasionally bring orchestral pianists into the limelight, as for example Igor Stravinsky does in episodes of his ballet Petrushka.

== See also ==
- List of compositions for piano and orchestra
