= Concerto in G major =

Many composers have written concerti in the key of G major. These include:

== Harpsichord and piano concertos ==
- Harpsichord Concerto BWV 1058 (J. S. Bach)
- Piano Concerto No. 4 (Mozart)
- Piano Concerto No. 17 (Mozart)
- Piano Concerto No. 4 (Beethoven)
- Piano Concerto No. 2 (Tchaikovsky)
- Piano Concerto in G (Ravel)
- Piano Concerto No. 2 (Bartók)
- Piano Concerto No. 5 (Prokofiev)

== Viola and violin concertos ==
- Viola Concerto (Telemann)
- Violin Concerto No. 4 (Haydn)
- Violin Concerto No. 3 (Mozart)

== Flute concertos ==
- Flute Concerto No. 1 (Mozart)

== See also ==
- List of compositions for cello and orchestra
- List of compositions for keyboard and orchestra
- List of compositions for violin and orchestra
