= Piano Concerto in A major =

Piano Concerto in A major may refer to:

- Piano Concerto No. 12 (Mozart)
- Piano Concerto No. 23 (Mozart)
- Piano Concerto No. 2 (Liszt)
