= Piano Concerto in C minor =

Piano Concerto in C minor may refer to:

- Piano Concerto No. 24 (Mozart)
- Piano Concerto No. 3 (Beethoven)
- Piano Concerto No. 4 (Ries)
- Piano Concerto No. 4 (Saint-Saëns)
- Piano Concerto (Pierné)
- Piano Concerto No. 2 (Rachmaninoff)
- Piano Concerto (Delius)
- Piano Concerto No. 1 (Medtner)
- Piano Concerto No. 1 (Shostakovich)
