= Rondo for Piano and Orchestra in A major (Mozart) =

Composition by Wolfgang Amadeus Mozart

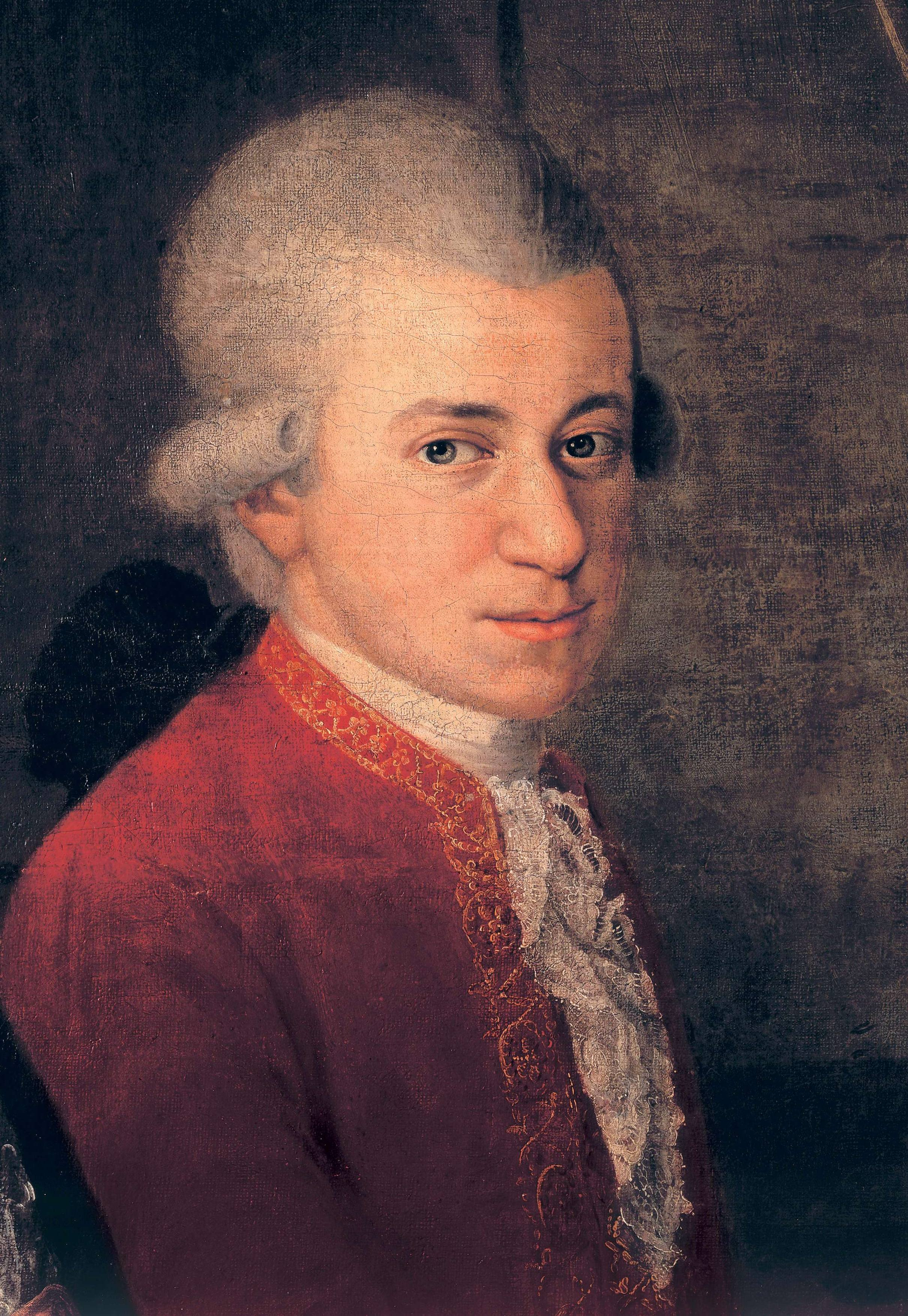
Detail of Wolfgang from the 1780–81 Portrait of the Mozart Family

The Rondo for Piano and Orchestra in A major, K. 386 is a concert rondo by Wolfgang Amadeus Mozart, believed by Alfred Einstein to have been composed in late 1782.

== Composition ==
Mozart wrote the Rondo in A major at around the same time as his three first Vienna piano concertos, nos. 11, 12 and 13.

When the autograph manuscript was sold, Mozart's widow and her helpers apparently were unable to locate the concluding pages, although some notations on it and contemporary correspondence show that they attempted to find the ending. Constanze Mozart sold the manuscript on November 8, 1799 to J. A. André, apparently with these final pages still missing, a fact that was unknown until Alan Tyson discovered them in the British Library in 1980. Before this, the rest of the autograph had been dismembered and scattered, and the only known version that was complete was Cipriani Potter's piano arrangement from about 1838. Alfred Einstein, using this and the two leaves of the score then known to be extant, published a reconstruction of the rondo in 1936, and further leaves that came to light were assembled in the Neue Mozart-Ausgabe (Serie V, Werkgruppe 15, Band 8) and in a 1962 completion by Paul Badura-Skoda and Charles Mackerras. The final leaves discovered by Tyson have now been incorporated into a supplement to the NMA (Serie X, Werkgruppe 31, Band 3).

Einstein's hypothetical reconstruction, with the Cipriani Potter ending, can be heard in some older recordings of the Rondo, such as the one by soloist Annie Fischer and conductor Ferenc Fricsay (1959). Most recent recordings of the rondo, such as those of Murray Perahia and Malcolm Bilson, include the rediscovered original ending.

== Possible Intentions ==
The musicologist Alfred Einstein believed that the piece was intended as either the original or a replacement finale for his Piano Concerto No. 12 in A. Both pieces are in the same key, and both were composed at similar times. However, there are considerable differences. The three concertos were composed by Mozart to be a quattro (with just four strings in accompaniment), whilst the Rondo cannot be, as the cellos have an independent line from the double basses. The first page of the manuscript was also titled and dated by Mozart, suggesting individuality.

== Description ==
The Rondo is marked allegretto, giving the piece a lively but unhurried feel. The piece is begun, as with much of Mozart's concerto work, by the strings, who play the piece's main theme. Again typical of the beginning of Mozart's piano and orchestral works, the piano only enters after about a minute of orchestral playing. It too plays the main theme, but in a very intimate and graceful manner. A second theme then follows, and mixes frivolous, playful elements with introspective, dreamier sections. The original theme then repeats, to be followed by another different melody. This melody is more imposing and serious than its precursors, until it wonderfully leads back into the original melody. The piece finishes with a coda in true rondo form to give an A-B-A-C-A-D structure. The piece lasts between 8 and 10 minutes, depending on how it is completed.

== Autograph manuscript ==
The work is signed and dated on the first page di Wolfgango Amadeo Mozart mpr / Vieña gli 19 d'Octo^{bre} 1782. The first 12 leaves of the autograph manuscript were acquired by the English composer William Sterndale Bennett sometime around 1840. These were then distributed, either as whole leaves or as small fragments, to Bennett's friends and family. Of these, the following portions are known:

- f.1 (bars 1–22): sold by Sotheby's on 23 May 2017; whereabouts unknown.
- ff.2–3 (bars 23–62): owned by an unknown private collector in Germany.
- f.4 (bars 63–78): Royal College of Surgeons of England, London.
- f.5 (bars 79–100): whereabouts unknown.
- f.6 (bars 101–115): two fragments, comprising the lower portion, are held by the Juilliard School in New York, and the University of Western Ontario.
- f.7 (bars 116–135): one fragment, comprising the string parts of bars 116–119 and 133–135, is held by the Juilliard School in New York; another fragment, comprising the lower portion of bars 119–133, were sold by the Kenneth W. Rendall Gallery in New York in 1998, and its whereabouts are currently unknown.
- f.8 (bars 136–154): Sibley Music Library, Rochester, NY.
- f.9 (bars 155–171): owned by Bin Ebisawa in Tokyo.
- ff.10–12 (bars 172–224): whereabouts unknown.
- ff.13–16 (bars 225–269): British Library, London.
