= Piano Concerto No. 1 (Medtner) =

1914–1918 composition by Nikolai Medtner

- by Nikolai Medtner
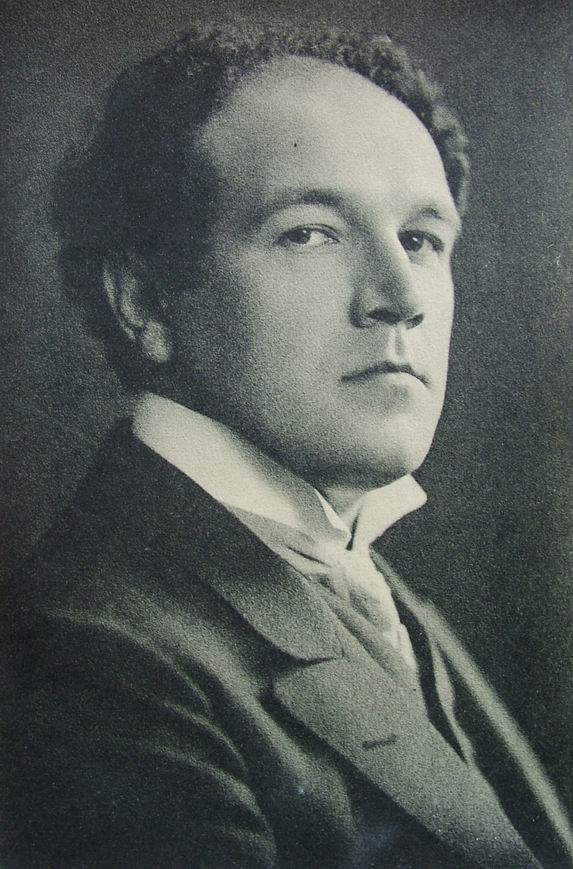
- Key: C minor
- Opus: 33
- Period: Late Romanticism
- Form: Piano concerto
- Composed: 1914–1918
- Published: 1921
- Movements: One (divided into four sections)

Premiere
- Date: 12 May 1918

The Piano Concerto No. 1 in C minor, Op. 33, is the first of Nikolai Medtner's three concertos for piano and orchestra, written between 1914 and 1918 in the middle of World War I and first published in 1921. The first performance was given on 12 May 1918 in Moscow with the composer at the piano, under Serge Koussevitzky's direction. The work is dedicated to Alexandra Karlovna Goedicke, Medtner's mother.

== Composition and musicality ==
The concerto is a war time work, written between 1914 and 1918, while the composer was still in Russia. The piano score was mostly written while Medtner was on holiday in Crimea with his friend and fellow pianist-composer Aleksandr Goldenweiser, while the orchestration took two years to complete. The influence of the ongoing war on the composition can be heard from the unexpectedly blaring and aggressive introduction.

The premiere of the concerto in Moscow took place within the context of a series of unfortunate events in Medtner's life: the chaotic aftermath of the 1917 Revolution, the departure of his friend Rachmaninoff (never to return to Russia again), and a wave of illnesses (typhoid fever, smallpox and pneumonia) striking Medtner's family, including Medtner himself. Having originally planned to dedicate the work to his brother Emil, the composer changed the dedication to honor his mother after she died of pneumonia in March 1918.

The concerto borrows musically from Brahms, Rachmaninoff and Liszt, the former two in its harmonic and melodic style, and the latter especially in its adoption of a multimovement form within a single overarching movement, as in Liszt's Piano Concerto No. 2. Most unusual is the concerto's treatment of development through variations, an innovation diverting from conventional sonata form. According to Hyperion, the concerto is "remarkable for its inspirational inner content, the beauty of its melodies and the grand scale of its structure", and is "probably [Medtner's] most outstanding work." The concerto is likened by some as a symphony featuring piano, owing to the prominence of its orchestral part and the complimentarity, rather than opposition, that characterizes the relationship between the piano part and orchestral part.

== Structure ==
The piano concerto is structured in a single uninterrupted movement in sonata form, divided into four sections:

1. Allegro (Exposition)
2. Tranquillo, meditamente (Development/Theme and Variations)
3. Tempo I (Recapitulation)
4. Coda. Allegro molto

The thematic and developmental richness of each section compensates for the lack of a traditional movement division: episodes in scherzo style emulate the middle movement of a symphony, and the coda serves as a finale. The entirety of the melodic material of the concerto is derived from its opening motifs and two main themes. The themes are later developed through a cycle of variations, with the use of complex polyphony. The recapitulation is short and abrasive, leading to the coda's final climax in the parallel C major.

A typical performance lasts around 30 to 35 minutes.

== Instrumentation ==
The work is scored for piano solo and orchestra, with 2 flutes, 2 oboes, 2 clarinets (B♭), 2 bassoons, 4 horns (F), 2 trumpets (B♭), 3 trombones, tuba, timpani, and strings (violas divisi).

== Critical reception and posterity ==
At its premiere, the concerto was met with mostly mixed or unfavorable reviews, with critics calling out Medtner's "technical incompetence" and the concerto's "overall lack of coherence". A documented exception is Alfred J. Swan, who, in 1922, referred to the First Concerto as Medtner's "most sublime work". Medtner performed this concerto with Leopold Stokowski and the Philharmonia Orchestra during his American tour in 1924.

It is likely that the success of the concerto was quickly overshadowed by that of other piano concertos written by his contemporaries in the same years, such as Prokofiev's Piano Concerto No. 2 (1913) and No. 3 (1921), as well as Rachmaninoff's Piano Concerto No. 1 (1917). However, contemporary opinion is more favorable, with musicologists regarding the concerto as Medtner's most successful attempt at single-movement large-scale sonata form.

The concerto has enjoyed renewed interest since the 1990's. BBC Music Magazine praised the concerto as "endlessly inventive and splendidly original". Dmitri Alexeev referred to the concerto as Medtner's "masterpiece".

== Recordings ==
Year	Pianist	Orchestra	Conductor	Comments
1947	Nikolai Medtner	London Philharmonia Orchestra	George Weldon	
1957	Abram Shatskes	Tchaikovsky Symphony Orchestra	Boris Khaikin	
1973	Igor Zhukov	Tchaikovsky Symphony Orchestra	Aleksandr Dmitriev	Recorded alongside Balakirev's First Piano Concerto ("Youth Concerto") with the Tchaikovsky Symphony Orchestra, which was then known as the USSR TV & Radio Large Symphony Orchestra.
1980	Tatiana Nikolayeva	Russian State Symphony Orchestra	Yevgeny Svetlanov	
1991	Geoffrey Tozer	London Philharmonic Orchestra	Neeme Järvi	Part of an album for Chandos also featuring Medtner's Piano Sonata No. 8 ("Sonata-Ballade").
1991	Geoffrey Douglas Madge	Arthur Rubinstein Philharmonic Orchestra	Ilya Stupel	Part of an album for BIS Records featuring all three of Medtner's Piano Concertos as well as his Piano Sonatas Nos. 5, 10 & 11 (Opp. 22, 38 & 39).
1994	Dmitri Alexeev	BBC Symphony Orchestra	Alexander Lazarev	This recording appeared in Volume 8 of Hyperion's "The Romantic Piano Concerto" series, alongside Medtner's Piano Quintet.
1999	Konstantin Scherbakov	Moscow Symphony Orchestra	Vladimir Ziva	Part of an album for Naxos including Medtner's First and Third piano concertos.
2010	Yevgeny Sudbin	São Paulo State Symphony Orchestra	John Neschling	Part of an album for the Musical Heritage Society featuring Medtner and Tchaikovsky's First Piano Concertos.
2017	Jayson Gillham	Melbourne Symphony Orchestra	Benjamin Northey	Recorded alongside Rachmaninoff's Second for ABC Classics.
