= Violin Concerto No. 4 (Haydn) =

Violin concerto by Joseph Haydn

- by Joseph Haydn
- Joseph Haydn in 1791; portrait by Thomas Hardy
- Key: G major
- Catalogue: Hob. VIIa/4
- Movements: 3

The Violin Concerto No. 4 in G major (Hob. VIIa/4) by Joseph Haydn is one of the composer's three surviving violin concertos.

A typical performance lasts approximately 19 minutes.

== Background ==
There is some doubt as to whether or not Haydn wrote the violin concerto, although there is general agreement that he did earlier than assumed, as it is more "old fashioned" than his previously numbered violin concertos. As with his first violin concerto, it might have been written for Luigi Tomasini, concertmaster of the Esterházy orchestra, where Haydn was kapellmeister. Although having been called "uniquely beautiful," Haydn remarked, "I was no wizard on any instrument, but I knew the potentialities and effects of all. I was not a bad pianist and singer and was also able to play a violin concerto."

== Music ==
I. Allegro moderato
Performed by The String Soloists

Scored for solo violin, string orchestra, and basso continuo, the concerto has three movements:

1. Allegro moderato
2. Adagio
3. Finale: Allegro

The first movement is smooth, and plaintive, in sonata form, with concise phrases and ornate embellishments. This is followed by an aria-like middle movement, which weaves between major and minor keys. The movemdent, with its "unmatched intimacy and loveliness," is followed by a "high-spirited" monothematic sonata-rondo. The last movement, perhaps the most Haydnesque of all three movements, closely follows the galloping patterns and embellishments used by C. P. E. Bach in his music.
