= Forgotten Melodies =

Composition by Nikolai Medtner

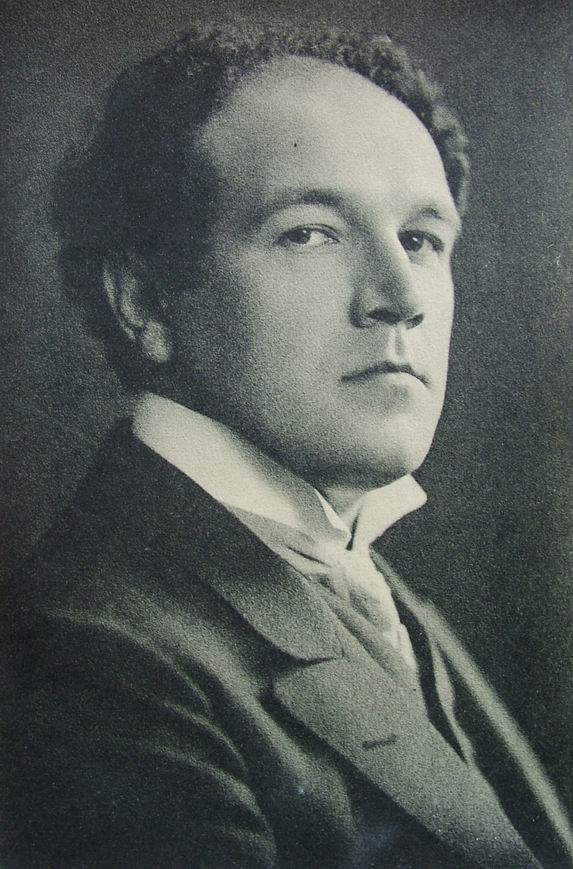
Nikolai Medtner

Forgotten Melodies, Opp. 38, 39 and 40 is a set of three cycles of short pieces for solo piano by the Russian composer Nikolai Medtner. The cycles were produced between 1917 and 1921, while Medtner was living in Moscow; the first and third cycles were published in 1922, and the second in 1923, all by the German publishing house Zimmerman.

Miller writes of the cycles that 'very little, if anything at all, in the way of Russian influences is discernible here; the general atmosphere would appear to be that of classical mythology.' The cycles contain a number of well-known showpieces for the piano, including the Danza Festiva, Op. 38, No. 3, a popular encore amongst pianists.

== Pieces ==
Cycle I, Op. 38 (1919–22)

1. Sonata reminiscenza (Соната-воспоминание)
2. Danza graziosa (Грациозный танец)
3. Danza festiva (Праздничный танец)
4. Canzona fluviala (Песнь на реке)
5. Danza rustica (Сельский танец)
6. Canzona serenata (Вечерния песня)
7. Danza silvestra (Лесной танец)
8. Alla reminiscenza (Как бы воспоминание)

Cycle II, Op. 39 (1919–20)

1. Meditazione (Раздумье)
2. Romanza (Романс)
3. Primavera (Frühlingsmärchen - Весна)
4. Canzona matinata (Утренняя песня)
5. Sonata tragica (Трагическая соната)

Cycle III, Op. 40 (1919–20)

1. Danza col canto (Танец с пением)
2. Danza sinfonica (Симфонический танец)
3. Danza fiorata (Танец цветения)
4. Danza jubilosa (Радостный танец)
5. Danza ondulata (Плавный танец)
6. Danza ditirambica (Дифирамбический танец)

== See also ==
- List of compositions by Nikolai Medtner
