= Piano Concerto No. 2 (Medtner) =

1927 concerto by Nikolai Medtner

Piano Concerto No. 2 in C minor, Op. 50, is a concerto for piano and orchestra by Russian composer Nikolai Medtner. The work was completed in 1927 and is dedicated to Medtner's contemporary Sergei Rachmaninoff, who had dedicated his own Fourth Piano Concerto to Medtner the year prior. The piece was premiered at the Moscow Conservatory on 13 March 1927, with the composer as soloist.

== Background ==
Medtner began work on the Second Piano Concerto in September 1921. A piano composer first and foremost, Medtner was purportedly tormented by the task of orchestral writing for the concerto. In correspondences with Rachmaninoff, Medtner expressed his apathy towards orchestration and struggle with the writing of the concerto:

Frankly, I have reached the point of feeling faint from my intense efforts to determine the choice of instruments in the orchestra with the same precision and sureness with which I am accustomed to determining harmony and everything else in my work.... And this is not at all a matter of studying!!! Even before this I have never been too lazy to learn and still never stop reading scores and various treatises, but this is of little help.... I have never in my life listened to a single symphony thinking of its orchestral lay-out, just as I have never been able to listen to your playing and make my own pianistic observations while doing so. Treatises on orchestration are of especially little help (though I do have some small knowledge of instrumentation), for from these works one can learn how to orchestrate the symphonies of Beethoven and Mozart, in a word, what is already orchestrated, but not symphonies in general and not one's own ideas.

Nevertheless, Medtner completed the work in January 1927 and was subsequently published by Zimmermann. The piece was premiered at the Moscow Conservatory on 13 March 1927, with the composer as soloist and his brother Alexander Medtner conducting.

== Music ==
The concerto is scored for 2 flutes, 2 oboes, 2 clarinets, 2 bassoons, 4 horns, 2 trumpets, 3 trombones, tuba, timpani, strings, and solo piano.

The work consists of three movements, lasting around 40 minutes:

1. Toccata. Allegro risoluto
2. Romanza. Andante con moto
3. Divertimento. Allegro risoluto e molto vivace

=== I. Toccata ===
Opening of Toccata

The first movement is highly rhythmic and exhibits rigorous thematic development between its multiple subjects and motifs, including its syncopated main theme, lyrical secondary subject, and staccato tertiary subject.

The movement contains a cadenza with an optional ossia extension.

Theme from Romanza

=== II. Romanza ===
The second movement features a lush cantabile theme with light accompaniment from the orchestra, with a central agitato section moving at a significantly higher pace than the outer sections.

=== III. Divertimento ===
The third movement begins attacca from the second movement with a rondo theme.

== Recordings ==
Medtner himself recorded the Second Concerto in 1947 as part of a sponsored effort by the Maharaja of Mysore. After a period of relative obscurity following the composer's death in 1951, renewed interest in the composer in the late 20th and early 21st century has led to a number of recordings of the concerto.

- Nikolai Medtner with the Philharmonia Orchestra conducted by Issay Dobrowen, 1947.
- Abram Shatskes with the USSR State Symphony Orchestra conducted by Yevgeny Svetlanov, 1959.
- Yara Bernette with the Munich Philharmonic, conducted by Rudolf Kempe, 1975.
- Dina Shevchuk with the Novosibirsk Symphony Orchestra conducted by Arnold Kats, 1976.
- Geoffrey Douglas Madge with the Arthur Rubinstein Philharmonic Orchestra conducted by Ilya Stupel, 1991.
- Geoffrey Tozer with the London Philharmonic Orchestra conducted by Neeme Järvi, 1991.
- Nikolai Demidenko with the BBC Scottish Symphony Orchestra conducted by Jerzy Maksymiuk, 1991.
- Konstantin Scherbakov with the Moscow Symphony Orchestra conducted by Igor Golovschin, 1996.
- Yevgeny Sudbin with the North Carolina Symphony conducted by Grant Llewellyn, 2008.
- Marc-André Hamelin with the London Philharmonic Orchestra conducted by Vladimir Jurowski, 2016.
