= Piano Concerto No. 20 (Mozart) =

1785 composition by W. A. Mozart

- by W. A. Mozart
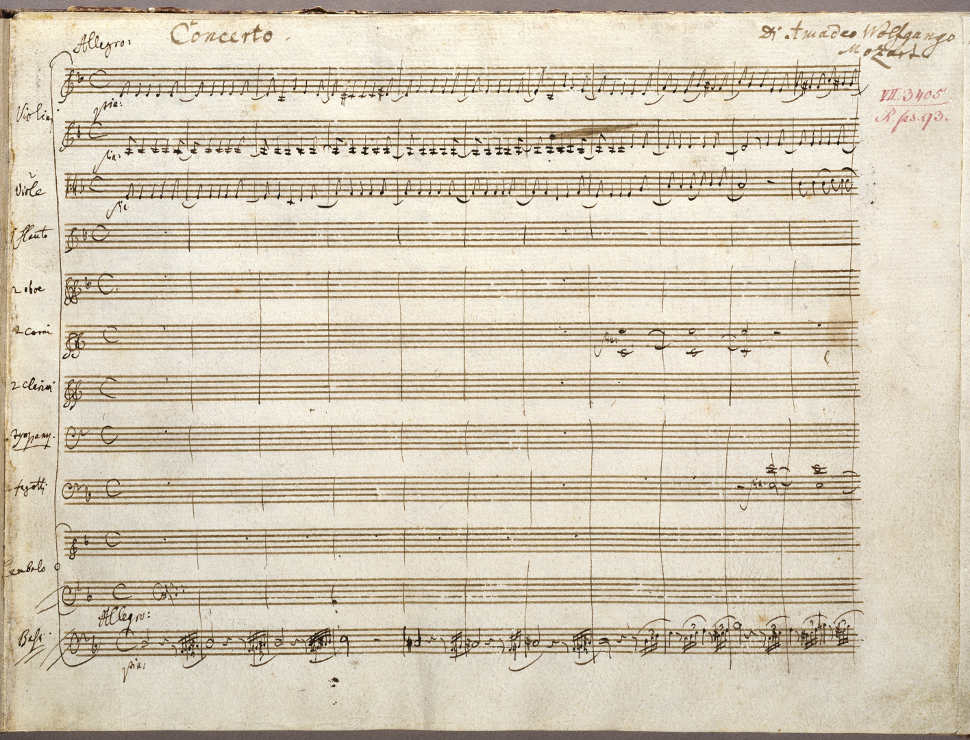
- First page of the autograph
- Key: D minor
- Catalogue: K. 466
- Genre: Piano concerto
- Style: Classical period
- Composed: 1785
- Movements: 3
- Scoring: Piano; orchestra

Premiere
- Date: 11 February 1785
- Location: Mehlgrube, Vienna
- Performers: Wolfgang Amadeus Mozart (soloist)

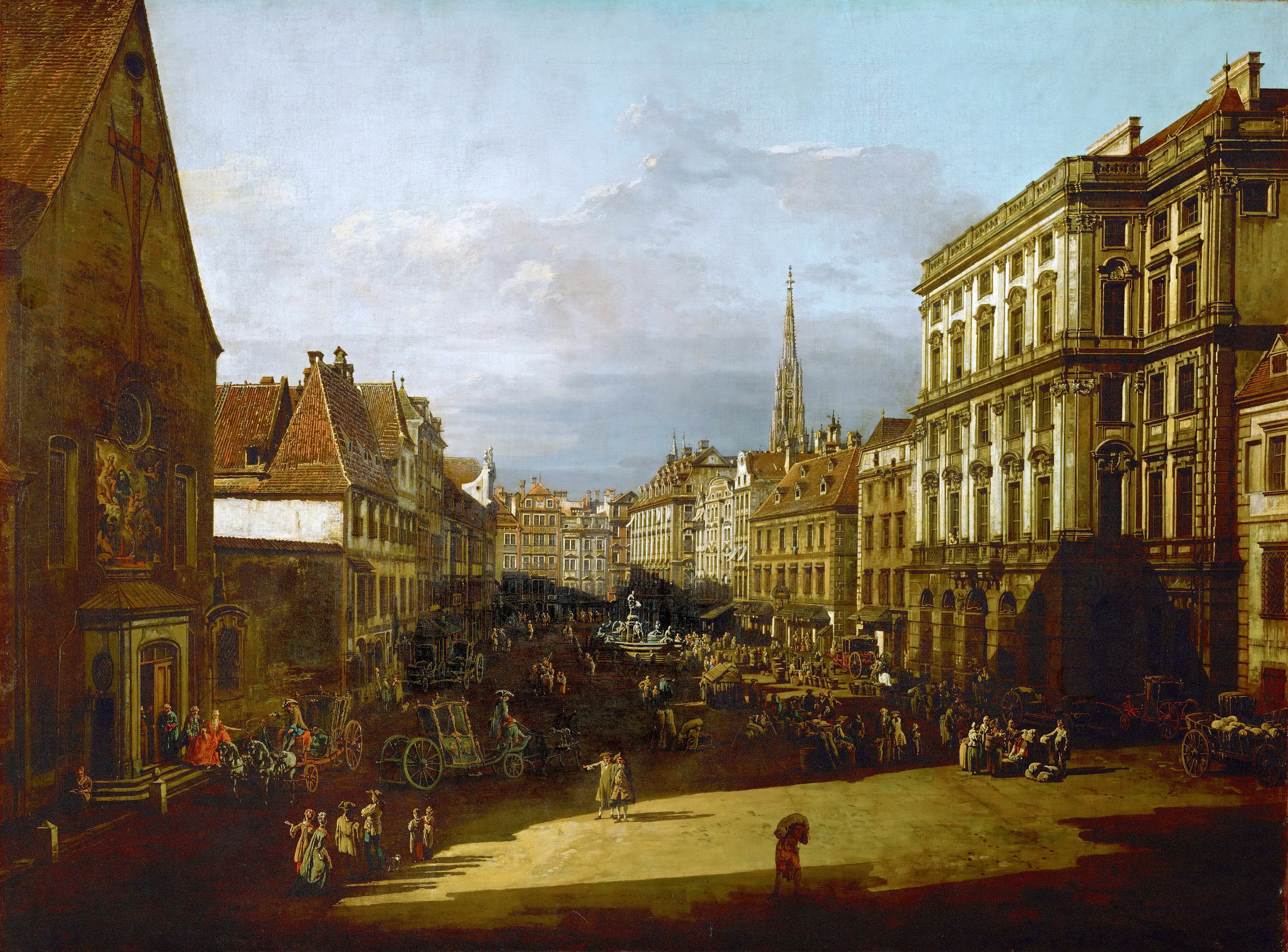
Neuer Markt in Vienna with Capuchin Church and Haus zur Mehlgrube on the right, painting by Bernardo Bellotto, 1760

The Piano Concerto No. 20 in D minor, K. 466, was composed by Wolfgang Amadeus Mozart in 1785. The first performance took place at the Mehlgrube Concert Hall in Vienna on 11 February 1785, with the composer as soloist.

== Background ==
A few days after the first performance, the composer's father, Leopold, visiting Vienna, wrote to his daughter Nannerl about her brother's recent success: "[I heard] an excellent new piano concerto by Wolfgang, on which the copyist was still at work when we got here, and your brother didn't even have time to play through the rondo because he had to oversee the copying operation."

The concerto is written in the key of D minor. Other works by Mozart in that key include the Fantasia K. 397 for piano, the Requiem, a Kyrie, a mass, the aria "Der Hölle Rache kocht in meinem Herzen" from the opera The Magic Flute, and parts of the opera Don Giovanni. It is the first of two Mozart piano concertos in a minor key (No. 24 in C minor is the other).

The young Ludwig van Beethoven admired this concerto and kept it in his repertoire. Composers who wrote cadenzas for it include Beethoven (WoO 58), Franz Xaver Wolfgang Mozart, Charles-Valentin Alkan, Johannes Brahms (WoO 14), Johann Nepomuk Hummel, Ferruccio Busoni, and Clara Schumann. Beethoven's is the most commonly performed.

One of Mozart's favorite pianos that he played while living in Vienna had a pedal-board operated with the feet, like that of an organ. This piano is on display at the Mozart House in Salzburg, but no longer has a pedal-board. That Mozart had a piano with a pedal-board is reported in a letter by his father, who visited his son in Vienna. Among Mozart's piano works, none are explicitly written with a part for a pedal-board, but according to Leopold's report, at the first performance of the Piano Concerto No. 20, Mozart, who was the soloist and conductor, used his own piano equipped with a pedal-board. Presumably the pedal-board was used to reinforce the left-hand part or add lower notes than the standard keyboard could play.

== Movements ==
I. Allegro

II. Romance

III. Allegro assai
Performed by Robert Casadesus, George Szell conducting the Cleveland Orchestra

The concerto is scored for solo piano, flute, two oboes, two bassoons, two horns, two trumpets, timpani and strings.

As is typical of concertos, it is in three movements:

1. Allegro (in D minor),
2. Romance (in B♭ major),
3. Allegro assai (in D minor, with coda in D major),

=== I. Allegro ===
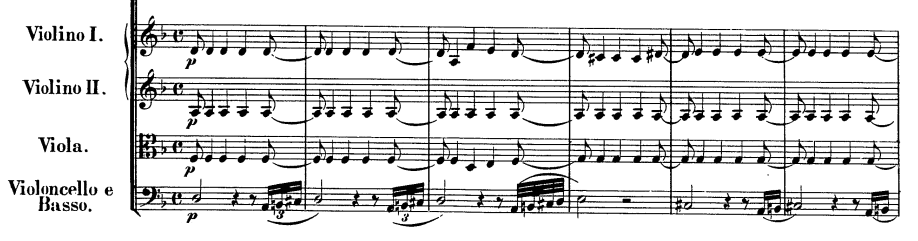

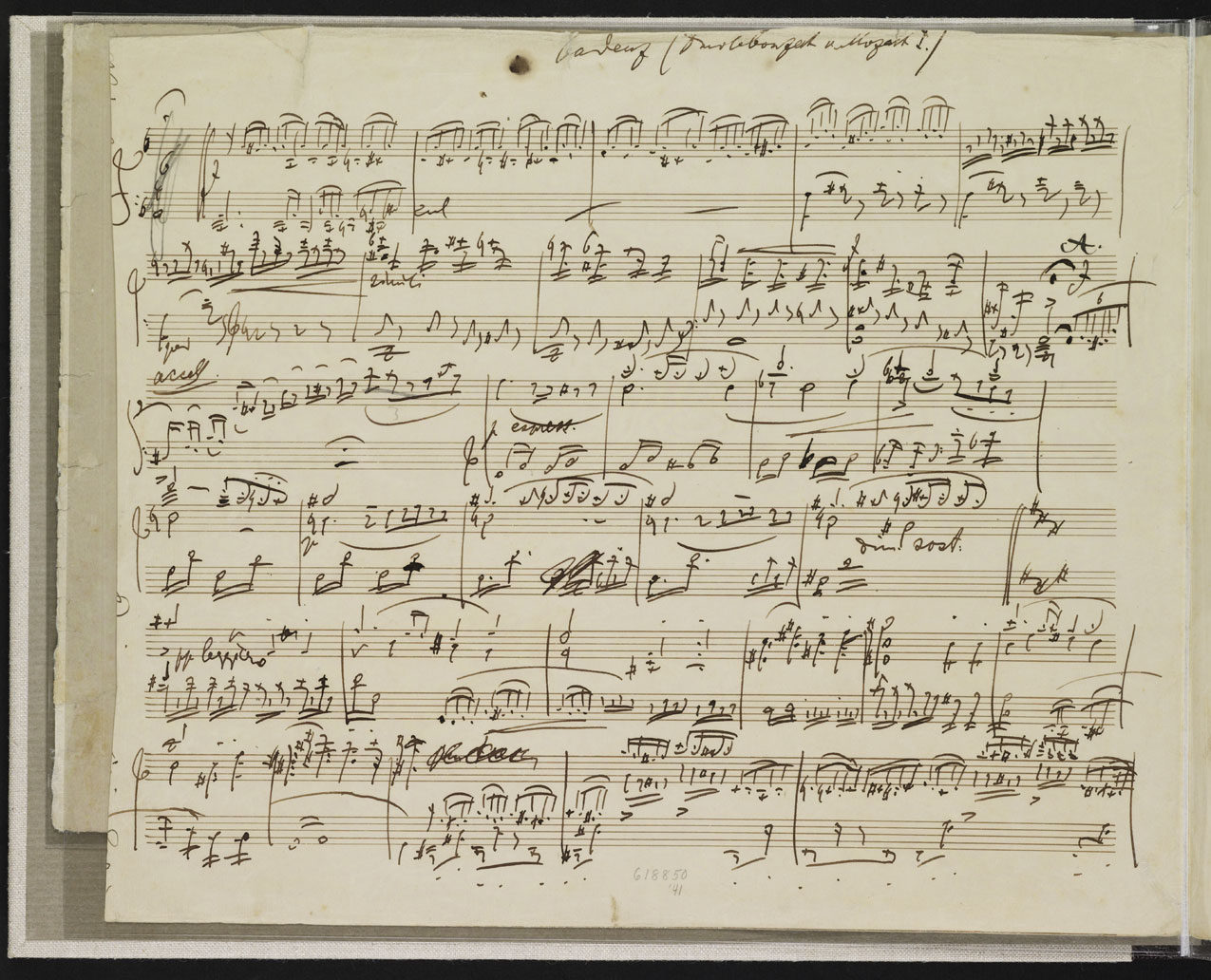
Manuscript of Brahms' cadenza to the first movement

The first movement, in D minor, starts with the strings restlessly but quietly building up to a full forte. Music critic Michael Steinberg calls this opening "all atmosphere and gesture—no theme". It is followed by the second theme, played by the woodwinds before being overtaken by the tutti orchestra.

The solo piano then introduces a new theme, whose construction Robert Levin has called "a masterful balance of expressive and narrative detail". The second theme in F major (the relative major) has a slightly brighter mood but never becomes jubilant. The timpani further heighten the tension in the coda before the cadenza starts. The movement ends on a quiet note.

=== II. Romance ===
The second movement, in B♭ major, is a five-part rondo (ABACA) with a coda. The trumpets and timpani are not used. The beginning features the solo piano playing the main B♭ major melody without accompaniment. This lyrical, tender, romantic melody inspired the movement's title, "Romance".

Halfway through, the piece moves on to the second episode (part C), where a storm sets in. A turbulent, agitated. ominous theme in the relative key of G minor greatly contrasts with the peaceful mood at the movement's start. After a transition back to B♭ major, the opening melody returns. The movement ends with a light and delicate ascending arpeggio.

=== III. Allegro assai ===
The final movement, a rondo, begins with the piano rippling upward in the home key before the orchestra replies with a furious section. (This piano "rippling" is known as the Mannheim Rocket and is a string of eighth notes (D–F–A–D–F) followed by a quarter note (A)). The piano introduces a second melody, whose mood is dark and restless. Then a cheerful melody in F major is introduced by the orchestra before the piano rounds it off. A series of biting piano chords snaps the bright melody, and passages in D minor return in the piano, then the orchestra. Modulations of the second theme to A minor and G minor follow. Thereafter follows the same format as above, with a momentary pause to introduce the cadenza.

After the cadenza, the piece becomes fully sunny, modulating to the parallel key of D major, and the bright melody is taken up by the winds. The piano repeats the theme before the orchestra develops the passage, ending the concerto.
