= Piano Concerto No. 13 (Mozart) =

Piano Concerto in three movements by W. A. Mozart

- by W. A. Mozart
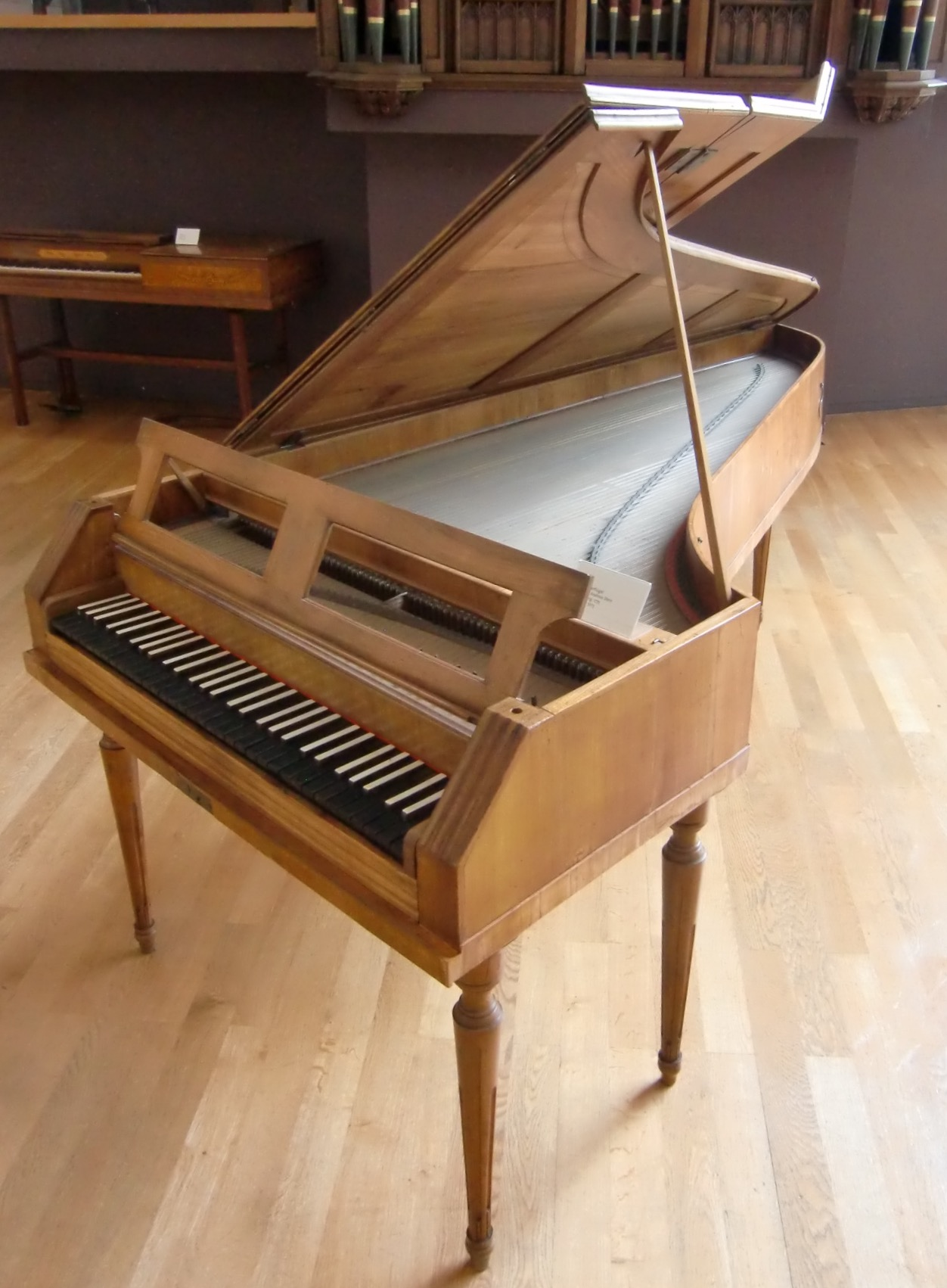
- Pianoforte by Johann Andreas Stein (Augsburg, 1775) – Berlin, Musikinstrumenten-Museum
- Key: C major
- Catalogue: K. 415
- Composed: 1782–83
- Movements: Three (Allegro vivace, Andante, Allegro)
- Scoring: Piano; orchestra

The Piano Concerto No. 13 in C major, K. 415 (387b) by Wolfgang Amadeus Mozart was composed in Vienna in 1782–83. It is the third of the first three full concertos Mozart composed for his subscription concerts.

It consists of three movements:

1. Allegro, in C major and
2. Andante, in F major and 3/4
3. Allegro assai, in C major and 6/8

The average duration of performance of Concerte für das Pianoforte (vol. 2, no.13), is 23 minutes.

Instrumentation: solo – piano (or harpsichord); orchestra: 2 oboes, 2 bassoons + 2 French horns, 2 trumpets + timpani + strings.

Mozart wrote this and the piano concertos nos. 11, K. 413, and 12, K. 414, for his subscription concerts, "either with a large orchestra with wind instruments or merely a quattro" [with string quartet].

== Assessment and reception ==
This concerto has long had an ambiguous reputation. The first movement starts with a quiet theme, similar to that of the later C major Concerto No. 21, but introduced fugato. The orchestral introduction builds to an impressive tutti, but many writers, including Hutchings and Girdlestone, have considered that after the entry of the keyboard this early promise is somewhat dissipated. The keyboard part itself consists of passages that do not integrate well with the fugato treatment of the ritornellic material, and, as Hutchings comments, the result is that the "whole is less than the sum of the parts".
