= Piano Concerto No. 23 (Mozart) =

1786 composition by Wolfgang Amadeus Mozart

- by W. A. Mozart
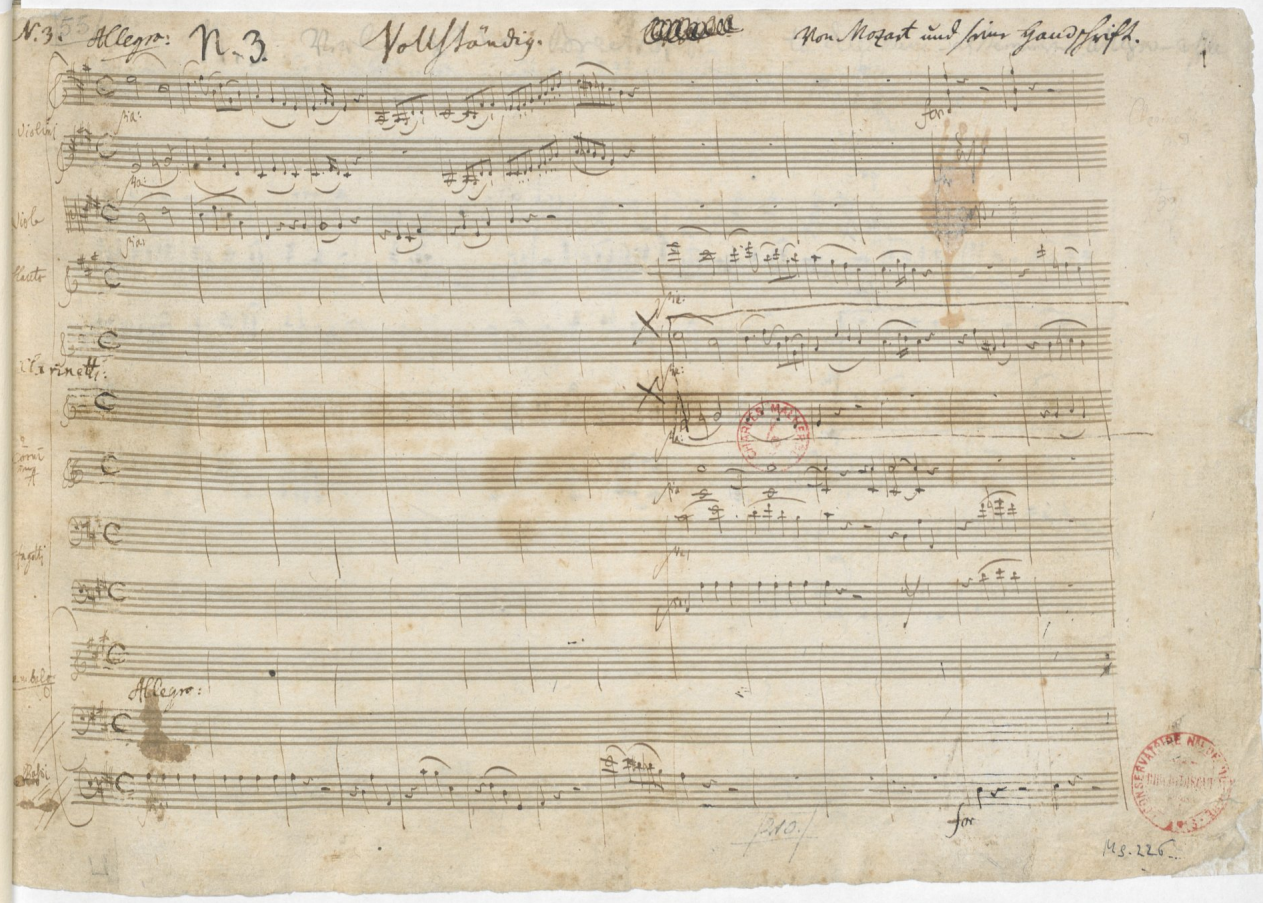
- First page of the autograph manuscript
- Key: A major
- Catalogue: K. 488
- Genre: Concerto
- Style: Classical era
- Composed: March 2, 1786
- Published: 1800
- Movements: 3
- Scoring: Piano; orchestra

The Piano Concerto No. 23 in A major, K. 488, is a concerto for piano and orchestra written by Wolfgang Amadeus Mozart. It was finished, according to Mozart's own catalogue, on 2 March 1786, two months prior to the premiere of his opera, Le nozze di Figaro, and some three weeks prior to the completion of his next piano concerto. It was one of three subscription concerts given that spring and was probably played by Mozart himself at one of these.

== Structure ==
The piano concerto is scored for piano solo and an orchestra consisting of one flute, two clarinets, two bassoons, two horns and strings. It consists of three movements and typically lasts for about 26 minutes:

1. Allegro in A major and common time
2. Adagio in F♯ minor and 6/8 time
3. Allegro assai in A major and alla breve, rondo form

=== I. Allegro ===
The first movement is in A major and is in sonata form. The piece begins with a double exposition, the first played by the orchestra, and the second when the piano joins in. The first exposition is static from a tonal point of view and is quite concise, the third theme is not yet revealed. The second exposition includes the soloist and is modulatory. It also includes the previously unheard third theme. The second exposition is ornamented as opposed to the first exposition which is not. The second theme has harmonic tension. This is expressed by dissonances that are played on the beat, and then solved by an interval of a descending second. This is also expressed in the use of chromatics in the melody and bass lines which is a source of harmonic tension, as the listeners anticipate the arrival of the tonic.

=== II. Adagio ===
Amir Siraj, piano; Midwest Young Artists Conservatory Symphony Orchestra

The slow second movement, in ternary form, is somewhat operatic in tone. The piano begins alone with a theme in Siciliano rhythm characterized by unusually wide leaps.

This is the only movement by Mozart in F♯ minor. The dynamics are soft throughout most of the piece. The middle of the movement contains a brighter section in A major announced by flute and clarinet that Mozart would later use to introduce the trio "Ah! taci ingiusto core!" in his 1787 opera Don Giovanni.

=== III. Allegro assai ===
The third movement is a sonata-rondo. It is shaded by moves into other keys as is the opening movement (to C major from E minor and back during the secondary theme in this case, for instance) and with a central section whose opening in F♯ minor is interrupted by a clarinet tune in D major, an intrusion that, according to Girdlestone, reminds one that instrumental music at the time was informed by opera buffa and its sudden changes of point of view as well as of scene.

== Reception ==
Daniel Heartz called it "the most beloved of all Mozart's piano works", devoting an extended discussion to the "infinitely sorrowful" second movement.

Carl Reinecke did not mention arpeggiation or rubato in his 1891 book about the revival of Mozart's piano concertos. But Neal Peres Da Costa described Reinecke's performance practice of delaying melodic notes, especially ones marked portato, in his c. 1905 Hupfeld piano roll recording of his own solo piano arrangement of the K. 488 slow movement. Peres Da Costa further noted that Louis Adam advised portato be "made with a little retard on the note" and that Francesco Pollini described the same practice as "contribut[ing] not a little to the expression" (as Pietro Lichtenthal reproduced in his dictionary).
