= Piano Concerto No. 12 (Mozart) =

1782 composition by W. A. Mozart

- by W. A. Mozart
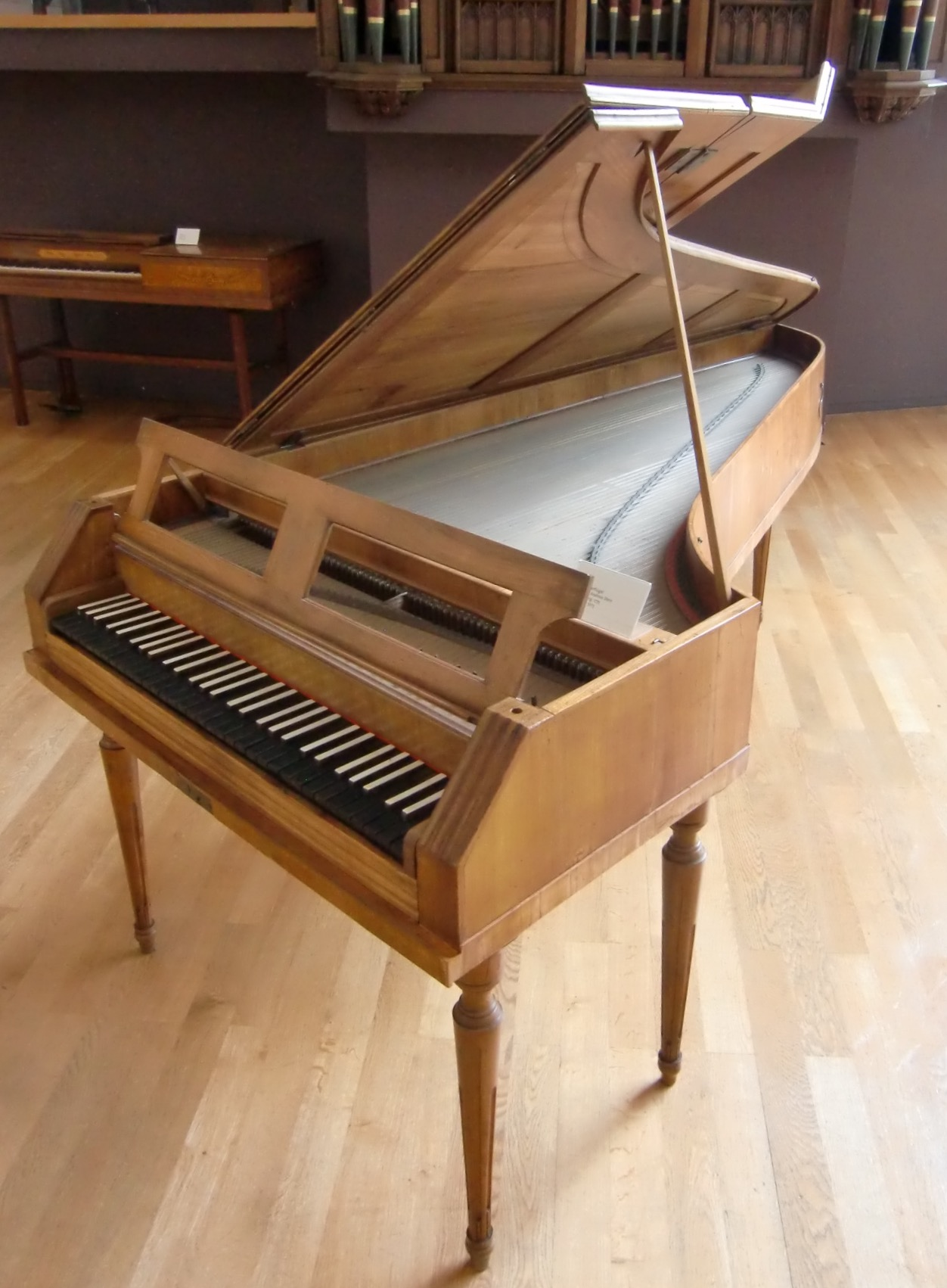
- Pianoforte by Johann Andreas Stein (Augsburg, 1775) – Berlin, Musikinstrumenten-Museum
- Key: A major
- Catalogue: K. 414
- Composed: 1782
- Movements: Three (Allegro, Andante, Allegretto)
- Scoring: Piano; orchestra
- I. Allegro II. Andante III. Allegretto Performed by Robert Casadesus and the Cleveland Orchestra, conducted by George Szell

Wolfgang Amadeus Mozart's Piano Concerto No. 12 in A major, K. 414 (385p), was written in the autumn of 1782 in Vienna. It is scored for solo piano (or harpsichord), two oboes, two bassoons (optional), two horns, and strings (consisting of violins, violas, cellos, and double basses). Like all three of the early Vienna concertos that Mozart wrote, it is a modest work that can be performed with only string quartet and keyboard (i.e., a quattro). As per 18th-century performance practice, a string orchestra could also have served as a suitable option for the quattro accompaniment.

The concerto has three movements:

1. Allegro
2. Andante in D major
3. Allegretto in A major

It was the first of a set of three keyboard concertos (with K. 413 and 415) that Mozart performed at his Lenten concerts in 1783. The concert rondo in A, K. 386, has often been discussed as an alternative finale to the work; however, K. 386 cannot be performed a quattro, and autograph evidence shows that the current finale starts on the same sheet as the end of the slow movement.

Despite the modest nature and scoring of this concerto, it stands out in Mozart's early production. Although the three early Viennese concertos (Nos 11, 12 and 13) represent in some senses a formal regression compared to their immediate predecessors, especially No. 9 in E♭ major, this concerto is a forerunner of the mature works in terms of its musical effect.

The second movement is notable for its quotation of a theme from the overture to La calamita de' cuori by Johann Christian Bach, Mozart's former mentor in London, who had just died on 1 January 1782. Since at this point Mozart also wrote back to his father concerning Bach's death, saying of it "what a loss to the musical world!", the moving Andante may also be regarded as a musical epitaph by the younger man for the old master.
