= List of municipal flags of Warmian–Masurian Voivodeship =

The following list includes flags of municipalities (gminas) in the Warmian-Masurian Voivodeship, Poland.

Flag of the Warmian–Masurian Voivodeship

According to the definition, a flag is a sheet of fabric of a specific shape, colour and meaning, attached to a spar or mast. It may also include the coat of arms or emblem of the administrative unit concerned. In Poland, territorial units (municipal, city and county councils) may establish flags in accordance with the Act of 21 December 1978 on badges and uniforms. In its original version, it only allowed territorial units to establish coats of arms. Despite that, many cities and municipalities, including those in the Warmińsko-Mazurskie Voivodeship, adopted resolutions and used the flag as their symbol. It was not until the ‘Act of 29 December 1998 amending certain acts in connection with the implementation of the state system reform’ that the right of Voivodeships, powiats and municipalities to establish this symbol of a territorial unit was officially confirmed.

In 2024, 63 out of 116 municipalities in Warmian-Masurian Voivodeship had their own flag. This symbol, since 2002, has been established by the voivodeship itself.

== List of valid municipal flags ==
=== Bartoszycki County ===
Municipality	Flag	Description
City of Bartoszyce		The town's flag is a rectangular flag with proportions ranging from 2:3 to 5:8 in black, with a white stripe in the upper part and a white axe in the central part. The flag refers to the Teutonic flag of Bartoszyce described by Jan Długosz in his work Banderia Prutenorum.
City and gmina Bisztynek		The flag of the municipality was established by Resolution No. XXVII/159/17 of 31 March 2017. It is a rectangular flag with proportions of 5:8, blue in colour, on the left side of the flag the emblem from the municipal coat of arms is placed.

=== Braniewski County ===
Municipality	Flag	Description
City of Braniewo		The city flag, designed by Kamil Wójcikowski and Robert Fidura, was established by Resolution No. III/16/24 of 19 June 2024. It is a rectangularflag with proportions of 5:8, divided into three vertical stripes in the ratio of 3:10:3: red, white with a green tree and blue. The central stripe of the flag refers to the shield of the coat of arms of Braniewo, while the side stripes to its keepers.
City and gmina Frombork		The municipal flag is a rectangular flag with proportions of 2:3, divided into three parts: blue, yellow and red in the shape of a flag. On the left-hand side of the flag it contains the municipal coat of arms.
Gmina Lelkowo		The municipal flag was established by Resolution No. XVI/78/12 of 20 June 2012. It is a rectangular flag with proportions of 5:8, green in colour (symbol of the municipality's agriculture), on the left side of the flag the municipal coat of arms is placed.
City and gmina Pieniężno		The flag of the municipality is a rectangular flag, divided into three equal horizontal stripes: yellow, white and blue. In the central part of the flag is the municipal coat of arms.
Gmina Płoskinia		The municipal flag a rectangular flag, divided into three horizontal stripes: green, narrow yellow and blue. In the central part of the flag is the municipal coat of arms.

=== Działdowski County ===
Municipality	Flag	Description
City of Działdowo		The city's flag was established on 28 March 1996. It is a rectangular flag with proportions of 5:8, divided into two equal horizontal stripes: yellow and blue. In the upper left corner of the flag is a knight's shield divided into 12 fields in a red and white chequered pattern, derived from the city's coat of arms.
City and gmina Lidzbark		The municipal flag is a rectangular flag with proportions 5:8, divided into three horizontal stripes: two white and a blue one in the ratio of 4:1:4. In the central part of the flag the municipal coat of arms is placed.

=== City of Elbląg ===
Flag	Description
	The city's flag refers to a banner from Hanseatic times. It is a rectangular flag, divided into two equal horizontal stripes: white and red. To the left are two Maltese crosses: the upper red and the lower white.

=== Elbląg County ===
Municipality	Flag	Description
Gmina Elbląg		The municipal flag was established by Resolution No. 143/XIX/2000 of 8 June 2000. It is a rectangular flag, divided into three equal horizontal stripes: red, white and green. In the central part of the flag is the municipal coat of arms.
Gmina Gronowo Elbląskie		The municipal flag was established by Resolution No. XVII/116/04 of 17 June 2004. It is a rectangular flag with proportions 5:8, blue in colour, in the central part of the flag the municipal coat of arms is placed.
Gmina Milejewo		The municipal flag, designed by Kamil Wójcikowski and Robert Fidura, was established by Resolution No. XXXV/199/2018 of 11 May 2018. It is a rectangular flag with proportions of 5:8, divided into 5 vertical stripes: three white and two red in the ratio of 1:2:10:2:1. In the central part of the flag the municipal coat of arms is placed.
City and gmina Młynary		The flag of the municipality was established by Resolution No. XXIX/186/2017 of 30 March 2017. It is a rectangular flag with proportions of 5:8, blue in colour, in the central part of the flag the municipal coat of arms is placed.
City and gmina Pasłęk		The municipal flag was established by Resolution No. XXIII/117/92 of 18 September 1992. It is a rectangular flag with proportions of 5:8, divided into 5 horizontal stripes: two yellow, two red and ond white. In the central part of the flag municipal coat of arms may be displayed.
City and gmina Tolkmicko		The municipal flag is a rectangular flag with proportions of 5:8, divided into three horizontal stripes: green, yellow and blue in the ratio of 1:8:1. In the left part of the flag is the emblem from the municipal coat of arms.

=== Ełk County ===
Municipality	Flag	Description
City of Ełk		The city's flag was established before 2000. It is a rectangular flag with proportions of 5:8, divided into two equal horizontal stripes: blue and green. In the central part of the flag is the coat of arms of the city.
Gmina Ełk		The municipality's flag was established by Resolution No. XXXI/230/2016 of 26 August 2016. It is a rectangular flag with proportions of 5:8, divided into two parts: the left yellow, with the municipality's coat of arms, and the right, divided into seven blue and yellow stripes of equal width.

=== Giżycko County ===
Municipality	Flag	Description
City of Giżycko		The city's flag was established on 25 April 1991, the current version, designed by Kamil Wójcikowski and Robert Fidura, was established by Resolution No. XVII/111/2019 of 30 October 2019. It is a rectangular flag with proportions of 5:8, blue in colour, in the left part of the flag the emblem from the city's coat of arms is placed.
Gmina Giżycko		The municipal flag was established on 30 June 1999. It is a rectangular flag with proportions of 5:8, divided into twelve blue and white fields radiating from the centre of the flag (the blue fields refer to the municipal lakes). In the central part of the flag is the municipal coat of arms.
Gmina Miłki		The municipal flag was established by Resolution No XXIX/214/2005 of 23 September 2005. It is a rectangular flag with proportions of 5:8, divided into three horizontal stripes: two white and a blue one in the ratio of 1:3:1. In the central part of the flag the municipal coat of arms is placed.

=== Gołdap County ===
Municipality	Flag	Description
City and gmina Gołdap		The municipal flag was established by Resolution No. XIV/121/96 of 16 February 1996. It is a rectangular flag with proportions of 2:3, green in colour, in the central part of the flag the municipal coat of arms is placed, surrounded by golden deer antlers, and above it the number ‘1570’, referring to the date of granting municipal rights.

=== Iława County ===
Municipality	Flag	Description
City of Iława		The city's flag was established on 24 April 1997. It is a rectangular flag divided into ten horizontal wavy stripes in white and blue. In the upper left corner of the flag is the city's coat of arms.
Gmina Iława		The municipality's flag is a rectangular flag with proportions of 5:8, divided into three vertical stripes: two blue and a yellow one with a ratio of 1:3:1. In the central part of the flag the municipality's coat of arms is placed.
City and gmina Kisielice		The municipality's flag, designed by Kamil Wójcikowski and Robert Fidura, was established by Resolution No. XXXVIII/309/2022 of 25 May 2022. It is a rectangular flag with proportions of 5:8, blue in colour, cut with a white diagonal stripe running from the bottom left corner to the upper right. In the upper left corner is the municipal coat of arms.
City of Lubawa		The city flag is a rectangular flag with proportions of 1:2, white in colour, in the central part of the flag the city coat of arms and the black inscription ‘LUBAWA’ are placed.
Gmina Lubawa		The municipality's flag was established in 1996. It is a rectangular flag with proportions of 5:8, divided into three equal horizontal stripes: white, green and yellow.
City of gmina Zalewo		The municipality flag, designed by Alfred Znamierowski, was established in May 1998. It is a rectangular flag with proportions of 5:8, divided into two parts: the left one, blue, with the municipal coat of arms, and the right one, divided into thirteen blue and white stripes, symbolising the municipalities lakes.

=== Kętrzyń County ===
Municipality	Flag	Description
Gmina Barciany		The municipal flag is a rectangular flag with proportions of 5:8, divided into three equal horizontal stripes: white, green and yellow.
City of Kętrzyn		The city's flag is a rectangular flag, divided into two equal horizontal stripes: blue and white. In the central part of the flag is the coat of arms of the city.
City and gmina Korsze		The municipal flag is a rectangular flag divided into three equal horizontal stripes: yellow, red and green. In its the part of flag is the municipal coat of arms.
City and gmina Reszel		The municipal flag was established by Resolution No. XVII/101/08 of 24 April 2008. It is a rectangular flag, divided into two equal vertical stripes: green with the emblem from the municipal coat of arms (symbol of forest and agriculture) and yellow (referring to the history of the town).

=== Lidzbark County ===
Municipality	Flag	Description
City of Lidzbark Warmiński		The city's flag was established on 20 May 1998. It is a rectangular flag, divided into two stripes: red and white. The emblem from the city's coat of arms is placed in the upper left corner. The flag refers to the Teutonic flag of the Bishopric of Warmia described by Jan Długosz in his work Banderia Prutenorum.
Gmina Lidzbark Warmiński		The municipality's flag was established by Resolution No. XXXIII/268/2013 of 30 October 2013. It is a rectangular flag with proportions of 5:8, divided into 5 vertical stripes: three blue and two white in the ratio of 12:11:34:11:12. In the central part of the flag the emblem from the municipal coat of arms is placed.
Gmina Lubomino		The municipal flag is a yellow rectangular flag with the municipal coat of arms in the centre.
City and gmina Orneta		The municipality's flag was established on 21 June 1995. It is a rectangular flag with proportions of 2:5, divided into three equal horizontal stripes: white, black and green.

=== Mrągowo County ===
Municipality	Flag	Description
City and gmina Mikołajki		The flag of the municipality was established on 20 June 1996. It is a rectangularf flag with proportions 3:5, divided into four quarters: two white, one red and one blue. The municipal coat of arms may appear in the upper right-hand corner.
City of Mrągowo		The city flag was established by Resolution No. XXVI/3/2000 of 29 June 2000. It is a rectangular flag with proportions of 5:8, divided into three vertical stripes: two blue and one white in the ratio of 1:3:1. In the central part of the flag is an emblem from the city coat of arms.
Gmina Piecki		The municipality's flag was established on 7 September 1996. It is a rectangular flag with proportions of 5:8, divided into three equal horizontal stripes: two yellow and blue.

=== Nowo Miasto County ===
Municipality	Flag	Description
Gmina Biskupiec		The municipal flag was established by Resolution No. XXVI/158/04 of 16 December 2004. It is a rectangular flag with proportions of 5:8, divided into two horizontal stripes: yellow and green in a ratio of 3:1. In the central part of the flag above the upper stripe there is the municipal coat of arms.
Gmina Grodziczno		The municipal flag was established by Resolution No. XII/96/08 of 8 February 2008. It is a rectangular flag with proportions of 5:8, divided into two horizontal stripes: yellow and green in the ratio of 2:1. In the central part of the flag the municipal coat of arms is placed.
City of Nowe Miasto Lubawskie		The city flag was established by Resolution No. XIX/142/2012 of 24 April 2012. It is a rectangular flag with proportions of 5:8, divided into two equal horizontal stripes: red and yellow. On the left side of the flag is the emblem from the city's coat of arms.

=== Olecko County ===
Municipality	Flag	Description
City and gmina Olecko		The municipal flag was established by Resolution No. XXIX/214/2005 of 23 September 2005. It is a rectangular flag with proportions of 5:8, divided into three horizontal stripes: two red and one white in the ratio of 1:5:1. In the central part of the flag is the emblem from the municipal coat of arms.

=== City of Olsztyn ===
Flag	Description
	The city's flag, designed by Jacek Skorupski, was established in 2003. It is a rectangular flag with proportions of 5:8, blue in colour, in the left part of which a golden shell (symbol of St James) is placed, and under it a white wavy line, referring to the River Łyna.

=== Olsztyn County ===
Municipality	Flag	Description
City and gmina Biskupiec		The municipal flag is a rectangular piece of cloth with proportions 5:8 white, in the central part of which the municipal coat of arms is placed.
City and gmina Dobre Miasto		The municipal flag was established by Resolution No. XXVI/129/2020 of 20 February 2020. It is a rectangular flag with proportions of 5:8, divided into three horizontal stripes: red, white and green in the ratio of 1:2:1. In the central part of the flag is an emblem from the municipal coat of arms.
Gmina Jonkowo		The municipal flag was established by Resolution No. XLV/324/2002 of 9 October 2002. It is a rectangular flag with proportions of 1:2, divided into two equal horizontal stripes: yellow and blue. In the central part of the flag is the municipal coat of arms.
City and gmina Olsztynek		The municipal flag was established by Resolution No. XVI-144/04 of 29 June 2004. It is a rectangular flag with proportions of 5:8, divided into three equal horizontal stripes: blue, yellow and green. In the central part of the flag the municipal coat of arms may be displayed.
Gmina Świątki		The municipality's flag was established by Resolution No. XXIV/214/2017 of 28 September 2017. It is a rectangular flag with proportions of 5:8, divided into three horizontal stripes: red, white and green in the ratio of 1:2:1. In the central part of the flag the municipality's coat of arms is placed.

=== Ostróda County ===
Municipality	Flag	Description
Gmina Dąbrówno		The municipal flag was established by Resolution No. XXXVI/254/06 of 31 August 2006. It is a rectangular flag with proportions of 5:8, red in colour, surrounded by a thin black outline, in the central part of the flag the coat of arms of the municipality is placed.
City and gmina Morąg		The municipality's flag was established by Resolution No. XVI/201/03 of 19 November 2003. It is a rectangular flag with proportions of 5:8, divided into two equal vertical stripes: yellow and green. In the central part of the flag is a white shell and a red pilgrim's staff - symbols of St James.
City of Ostróda		The city's flag was established by Resolution No. XXII/118/96 of 14 February 1996. It is a rectangular flag with proportions of 9:11, divided into four quarters: two white and two red. The emblem from the city's coat of arms is placed in the upper left corner. The flag is a reference to the Teutonic battle flag of the city described by Jan Długosz in his work Banderia Prutenorum.
Gmina Ostróda		The municipality's flag was established on 18 December 1996. It is a rectangular flag with proportions of 5:8, divided into three equal horizontal stripes: red, yellow and green.

=== Pisz County ===
Municipality	Flag	Description
City and gmina Orzysz		The municipal flag was established by Resolution No. XLVI/659/06 of 30 August 2006. It is a rectangular flag with proportions of 5:8, divided into three equal horizontal stripes: yellow, green and blue.
City and gmina Ruciane-Nida		The municipal flag was established by Resolution No. XXII/62/2004 of 27 July 2004. It is a rectangular flag, white in colour, in the central part of the flag the municipal coat of arms is placed.

=== Szczytno County ===
Municipality	Flag	Description
Gmina Dźwierzuty		The municipality's flag is a rectangular flag with proportions of 5:8, divided into three equal horizontal stripes: two gold and green.
Gmina Jedwabno		The municipality's flag was established on 12 October 1999. It is a rectangular flag with proportions of 5:8, divided into three vertical stripes: two red and a golden one in the ratio of 1:4:1. In its central part there is a black cormorant, taken from the municipal coat of arms.
City and gmina Pasym		The flag of the municipality was established by Resolution No. XXXIX/264/2018 of 10 May 2018. It is a rectangular flag with proportions of 5:8, divided into three equal vertical stripes: two blue and one white.
Gmina Rozogi		The municipality's flag was established by Resolution No. XXIV/175/17 of 27 June 2017. It is a rectangular flag with proportions of 5:8, divided into three vertical stripes: two red and a one gold in the ratio of 1.5:5:1.5. In the central part of the flag, the emblem from the municipality's coat of arms is placed.
City of Szczytno		The city flag is a rectangular flag with proportions of 5:8, divided into three equal vertical stripes: green, white and red. In the central part of the flag is the city coat of arms.
Gmina Szczytno		The municipal flag was established by Resolution No. XIX/139/04 of 22 June 2004. It is a rectangular flag with proportions of 5:8, divided into two equal horizontal stripes: green and yellow in the ratio of 2:1. In the central part of the flag the municipal coat of arms is placed.
Gmina Świętajno		The municipality's flag was established on 30 October 1997. It is a rectangular flag with proportions of 5:8, divided into two equal horizontal stripes: green and gold.
City and gmina Wielbark		The municipal flag was established by Resolution No. XXXIII/192/06 of 14 September 2006. It is a rectangular flag with proportions of 5:8, divided into three vertical stripes: two red and one white in the ratio of 1:3:1. In the central part of the flag the municipal coat of arms is placed.

== Former flags ==
=== Braniewski County ===
Municipality	Flag	Description
City of Braniewo		The previous design of the flag was used between 1991 and 2024. It was a rectangular flag with proportions of 7:11, either horizontal (basic, according to the resolution) or vertical (according to the statute), divided into three equal stripes: green, white and red. In the central part of the flag is the coat of arms of the city.

== See also ==
- Flags of Counties in the Warmian-Masurian Voivodeship
