= Jakob Christmann =

German astronomer and orientalist

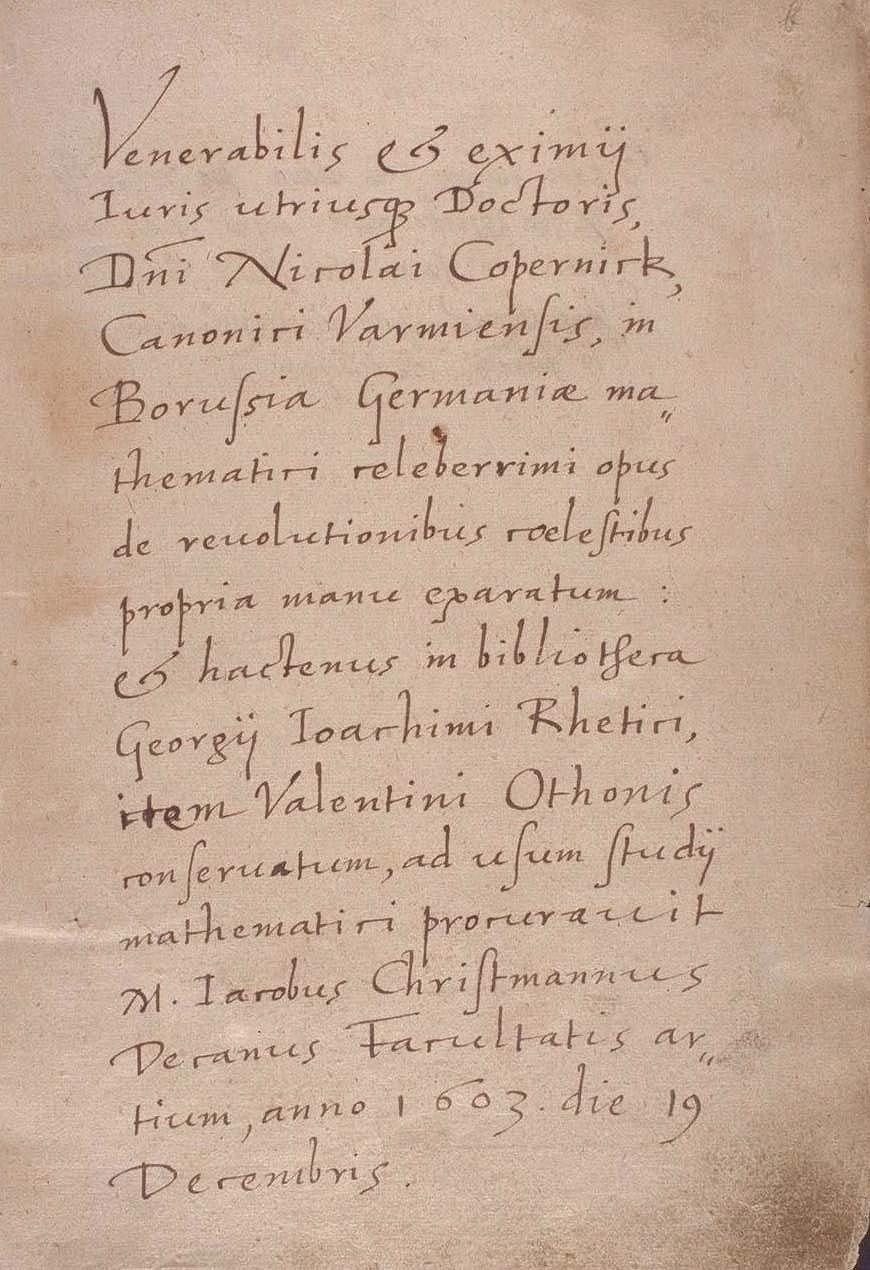
Note by Christmann in the De revolutionibus manuscript, 1603

Jakob Christmann (November 1554 – 16 June 1613) was a German Orientalist who also studied problems of astronomy.

== Life ==
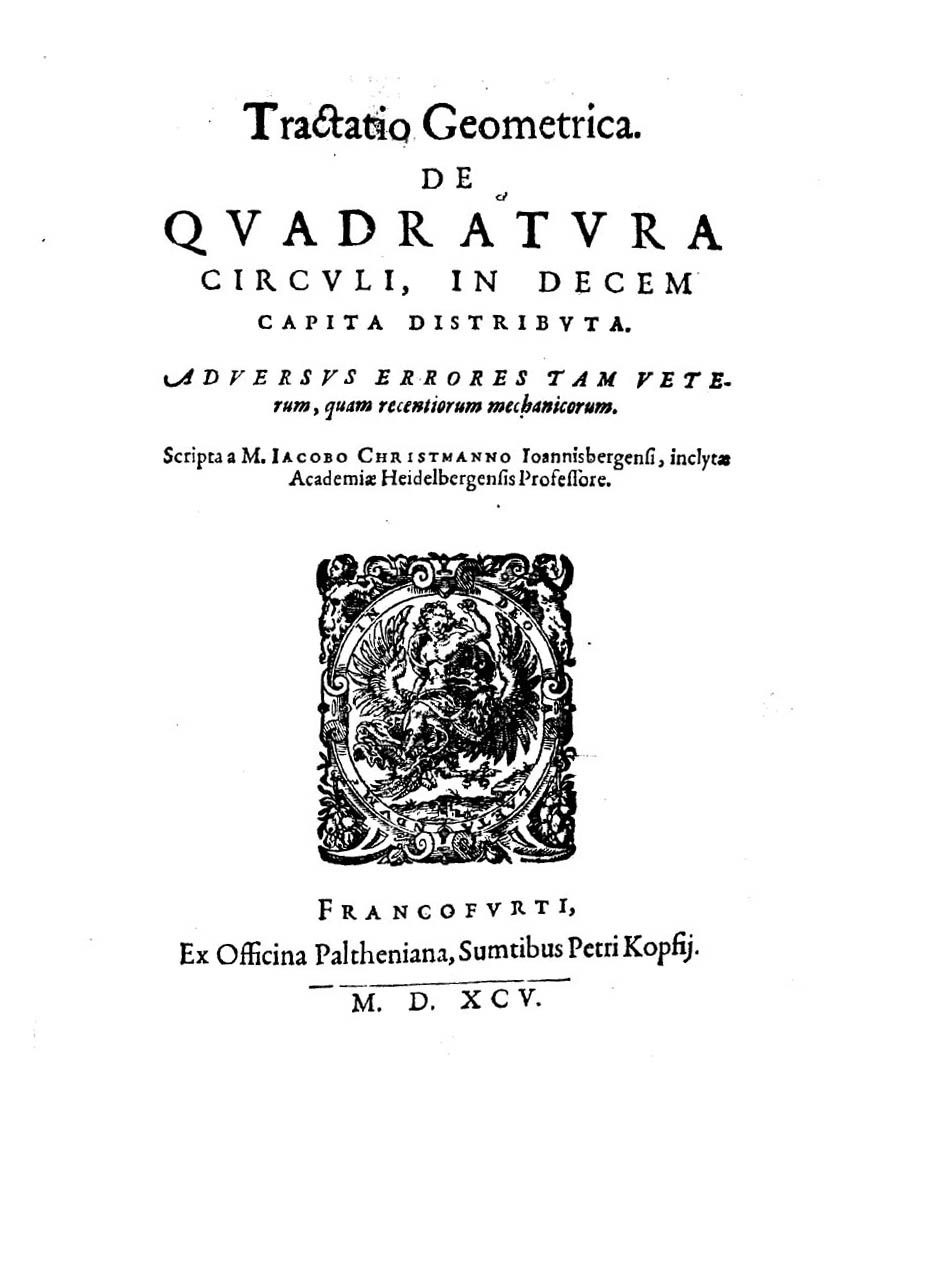
Tractatio geometrica de quadratura circuli, 1595

Christmann was born in November 1554 in Johannisberg. Christmann, a Jew who converted before 1578 to Christianity, studied Orientalistics at the University of Heidelberg's Collegium Sapientiae and became teacher at the Dionysianum. He followed humanist Thomas Erastus to Basel and continued his study tour in Breslau, Vienna and Prague.

In 1578, Pfalzgraf John Casimir founded the Reformed Casmirianum at Neustadt an der Haardt. Christmann joined the Casimirianum faculty in 1582 and dedicated his Arabic language grammar, Alphabetum arabicum, to his colleagues there.

After the return of the Reformed faith to the Electorate of the Palatinate, Christmann returned to Heidelberg to serve on the faculty of the Collegium Sapientiae in 1584. After some internal debate about the location of the chair, Christmann was appointed professor of Hebrew at the university in 1585. He compiled a catalog of the manuscripts of Guillaume Postel (1510–1581), located since 1551 at Heidelberg Castle. In 1590 he published a Latin translation of the astronomy of Al-Farghani. In 1609 at the urging of Elector Frederick IV, he was appointed Europe's second professor for the Arabic language.

He died on 16 June 1613 in Heidelberg, at the age of 58.

== Copernicus manuscript ==
A De revolutionibus manuscript of Nicolaus Copernicus passed via Rheticus to others and was marked on 19 December 1603 by Christmann with Nicolai Copernick Canonici Varmiensis in Borussia Germaniae mathematici … ("of Canon Nicolaus Copernick from Warmia in Prussia of Germany, of the mathematician …"). Since 1953 it is located in Kraków in the Jagiellonian library (Signatur: Ms. BJ. 10 000) and is accessible online.

== Work ==
- Alphabetum Arabicum cum isagoge Arabice legendi ac scribendi, Neustadt 1582
- Muhammedis Alfraganii Arabis chronologia et astronomiae elementa, Frankfurt 1590
