= Leszek Zasztowt =

Polish historian

Leszek Zasztowt (born February 25, 1953, in Olsztyn) is a Polish historian and professor at the University of Warsaw.

== Career ==
He graduated from high school in Warsaw, and subsequently studied history at the University of Warsaw. In 1978 he started to work in the L.& A. Birkenmajer Institute for the History of Science, Polish Academy of Sciences; where he held the post of director during the years 2007 through 2015. Since 1998 he has been employed by the Centre for East European Studies of the University of Warsaw. He received professorship at the University in 2006, and became a full professor in 2009. He is a chairman of the scientific council of the Polish Academy of Sciences Archives in Warsaw. Up until 1991 he was a secretary, and in 2010 he was promoted to president of the Mianowski Fund - Foundation for the Promotion of Science. He is a member of the Warsaw Scientific Society (2002), and was its general secretary (2011-2020). He was a J. William Fulbright scholar at the University of California, Berkeley (1999/2000), and received a British Academy scholarship in 1988. He has lectured as a guest at the Masaryk University in Brno, Czech Republic, Lund University in Sweden.He is also a member of scholarly commission of the Research Centre for the History of East Europe (Czech Academy of Sciences)

His research concerns the history of East Central Europe and Russia since the 19th to the 20th century, especially the issues embracing political, social, confessional, educational, academic and scholarly life.

== Works ==
- L. Zasztowt, Józef Mianowski. Biografia konserwatysty, Warszawa 2021, 234 s.
- L. Zasztowt, J. Szumski (ed.), Rok 1918. Odrodzona Polska i Sowiecka Rosja w nowej Europie, Warszawa 2019, vol. I: 489 p.; vol. II: 402 p.
- Melting Puzzle. The Nobility, Society, Education and Scholarly Life in East Central Europe (1800s-1900s), "Bibliotheca Europae Orientalis", vol. XLIX, studia 7, Warsaw 2018, 367 p.
- L. Zasztowt, J. Schiller-Walicka (ed.), Historia nauki polskiej, Vol. 10, 1944-1989, Warsaw 2015, part 1 - Warunki rozwoju nauki polskiej, 448 p.; part 2 - Instytucje, 718 p., part 3 - Idee i polityka, 446 p.
- L. Zasztowt, P. Hübner, J. Piskurewicz, J. Soszyński, A History of the Józef Mianowski Fund, translated and edited by Jacek Soszyński, Warsaw 2013, 166 p.
- Akademie nauk, uniwersytety, organizacje nauki. Polsko-rosyjskie relacje w sferze nauki XVIII-XX w., ed. L. Zasztowt, Warsaw 2013, 756 p.
- Kasa Mianowskiego 1881-2011, ed. L. Zasztowt, Warsaw 2011, 468 p.
- East and West. History and Contemporary State of Eastern Studies, ed. L. Zasztowt, J. Malicki, "Bibliotheca Europae Orientalis", Vol. XXXIV, didactica 5, Warsaw 2009, 338 p.
- Europa Środkowo-Wschodnia a Rosja XIX-XX wieku. W kręgu edukacji i polityki, "Bibliotheca Europae Orientalis", Vol. XXVII, Studia 3, Warsaw 2007, 561 p.
- Instytut Historii Nauki Polskiej Akademii Nauk w latach 1953-2003. Księga jubileuszowa z okazji pięćdziesięciolecia działalności, ed. L. Zasztowt, J. Schiller, Warsaw 2004, 508 p.
- Kresy 1832-1864. Szkolnictwo na ziemiach litewskich i ruskich dawnej Rzeczypospolitej. Warsaw 1997, 456 p.
- L. Zasztowt, P. Hübner, J. Piskurewicz, Kasa im. Józefa Mianowskiego – Fundacja Popierania Nauki 1881-1991, Warsaw 1992, 70 p.
- Popularyzacja nauki w Królestwie Polskim 1864-1905, Wrocław 1989, 278 p.
