= David Pareus =

German theologian (1548–1622)

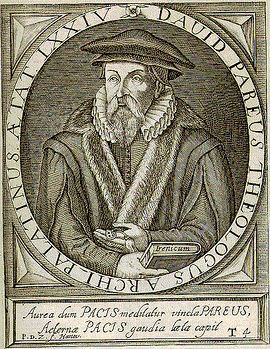

David Pareus (30 December 1548 – 15 June 1622) was a German Reformed Protestant theologian and reformer.

== Life ==
He was born at Frankenstein in Schlesien on 30 December 1548. At some point, he hellenized his original surname, Wängler (meaning "cheek"), as Parēus (from Greek παρειά or παρηή, "cheek").

He was apprenticed to an apothecary and again to a shoemaker. In 1564 he entered the school of Christoph Schilling at Hirschberg, whom he accompanied to Amberg, in 1566; but immediately entered the Collegium Sapientiae, at Heidelberg. His father disinherited him because of the opinions that David formed during his studies, under Zacharias Ursinus. On 13 May 1571 he became pastor at Niederschlettenbach and six months later a teacher in the Paedagogium at Heidelberg. On 24 August 1573 he resumed the pastorate in the previously Roman Catholic village of Hemsbach; where, with the consent of the congregation, he reconstructed the church along Reformed lines.

Dismissed from his office after the death of Frederick III, Elector Palatine, Pareus was appointed in 1577, by Count Palatine Johann Casimir, as pastor at Oggersheim. Transferred to Winzingen in 1580, he cultivated acquaintance with the teachers at the Casimirianum, in the neighboring Neustadt. After the death of Ludwig VI, Johann Casimir, acting as regent of the Palatinate, called Pareus as teacher to the Collegium Sapientiae in September 1584. Pareus became the director of the Collegium in 1591. In 1598, he entered the theological faculty as teacher of the Old Testament and from 1602 he taught the New Testament. He remained at Heidelberg until his death. He attracted many students from far and wide. From 1592, he belonged to the Palatine church council. In September 1621, as the Spanish troops approached the Palatinate, Pareus fled to Annweiler, and later to Neustadt. Then, when Frederick V, Elector Palatine returned temporarily to the Palatinate, Pareus returned to Heidelberg, in May 1622, where he died on 15 June 1622.

He was survived only by his son Philipp (1576–1648), who issued his father's writings, to which he prefixed a biography (Frankfurt, 1647).

== Works ==
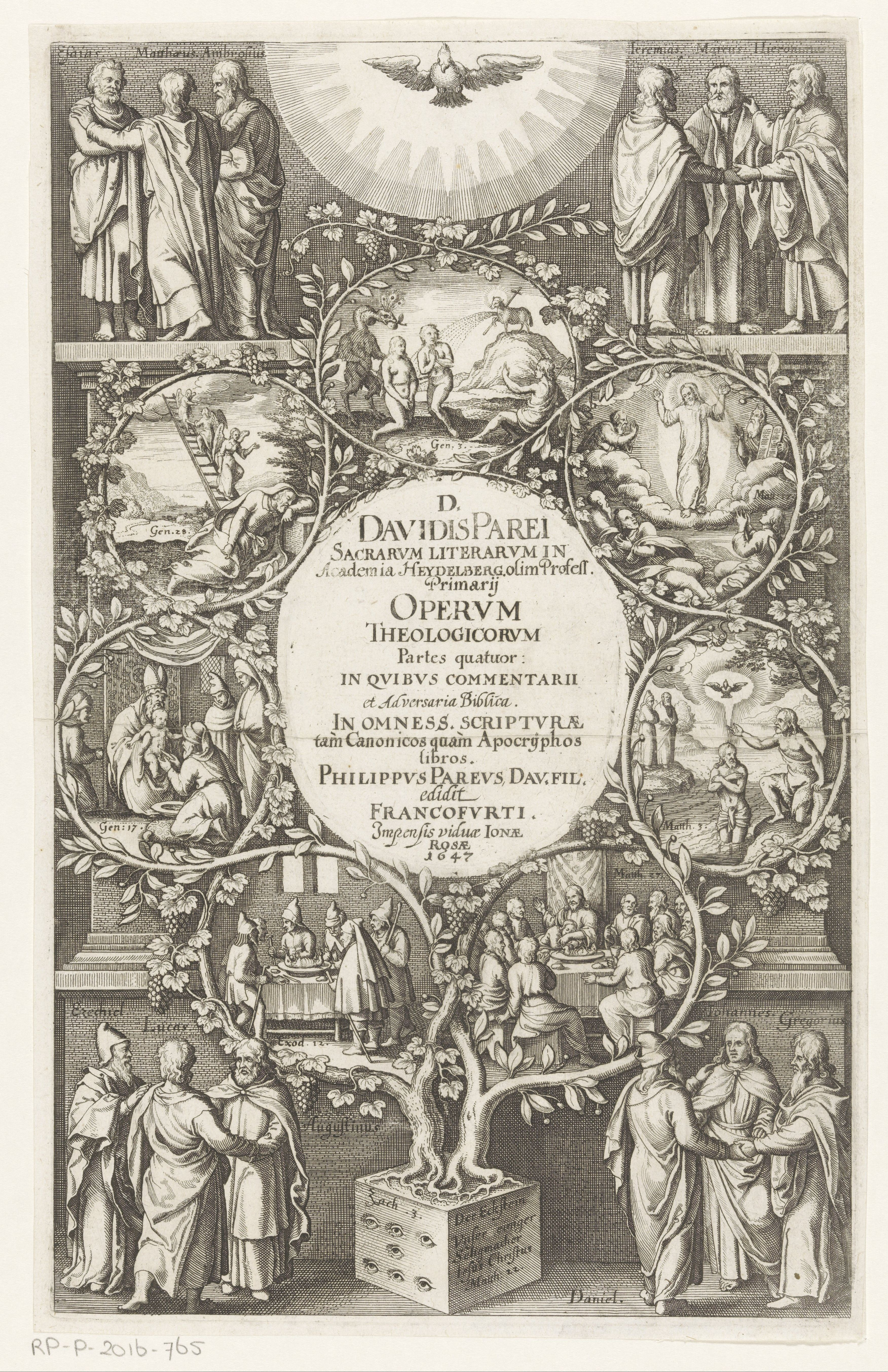
David Pareus. Operum Theologicorum Partes quatuor. Frankfurt: Rosa, Jonas, 1647.

Pareus began his literary activity with a tract against the doctrine of ubiquity, Methodus ubitquitariae controversiae (Neustadt, 1586). Polemical matter accompanied his issue of the Neustadter Bibel, 1587, an edition of Luther's translation, with appended table of contents and superscriptions. Jakob Andrea, in his Christliche Erinnerung (Tabingen, 1589), styled this publication an "arrant piece of knavery"; while Pareus, in Rettung der Neustadter Bibel (Neustadt, 1589), answered in a more moderate tone.

Pareus further contended against Johann Georg Siegwart in Sieg der Neustädtischen Bibel (Neustadt, 1591), and with Egidius Hunnius, in 1593–99, who accused him of the judaizing error of the Reformed party, with Clypeus veritatis catholicae de sacrosancta trinitate and Orthodoxus Calvinus. He also issued various tracts against the papacy (1604–17).

Despite these many literary battles, Pareus was by nature irenic. In constructive activity were the many editions, after 1593, of his Summarische Erklärung der Katholischen in der Churpfalz geübten Lehre; and his numerous commentaries on the Old and New Testament Scriptures (published 1605–1618). In the Irenicum sive de unione et synodo evangelicorum liber votivus (Heidelberg, 1614–1615), he proposed a general synod of all Evangelicals to unite the Lutherans and the Calvinists, who, he represents, were surely at one in every essential. On only one point, however, not affecting the foundation of belief, was there divergence. This appeal of Pareus brought little response from his contemporaries, and his overture for peace was rejected by the Lutheran theologians Hutter and Siegwart.

Pareus advocated calling rulers to account for their actions. These opinions were viewed with suspicion by the absolute monarchy of James I of England. In 1622, authorities in Oxford were ordered to search libraries and bookshops and to burn every copy of his work.

Other works include;

- Hoseas Propheta commentariis illustratus: cum translatione triplici
- In divinam ad Galatas s. apostoli epistolam commentaries
- Theses de providentia Dei
- Calvinus orthodoxus, h. e. Doctrina orthod. Joh. Calv. de SS. Trinitate Christi divinitate
- A commentary upon the divine Revelation of the apostle and evangelist John
- In Genesin Mosis Commentarius
- On the Grace of the First Man
