= Zacharias Ursinus =

German Protestant theologian (1534–1583)

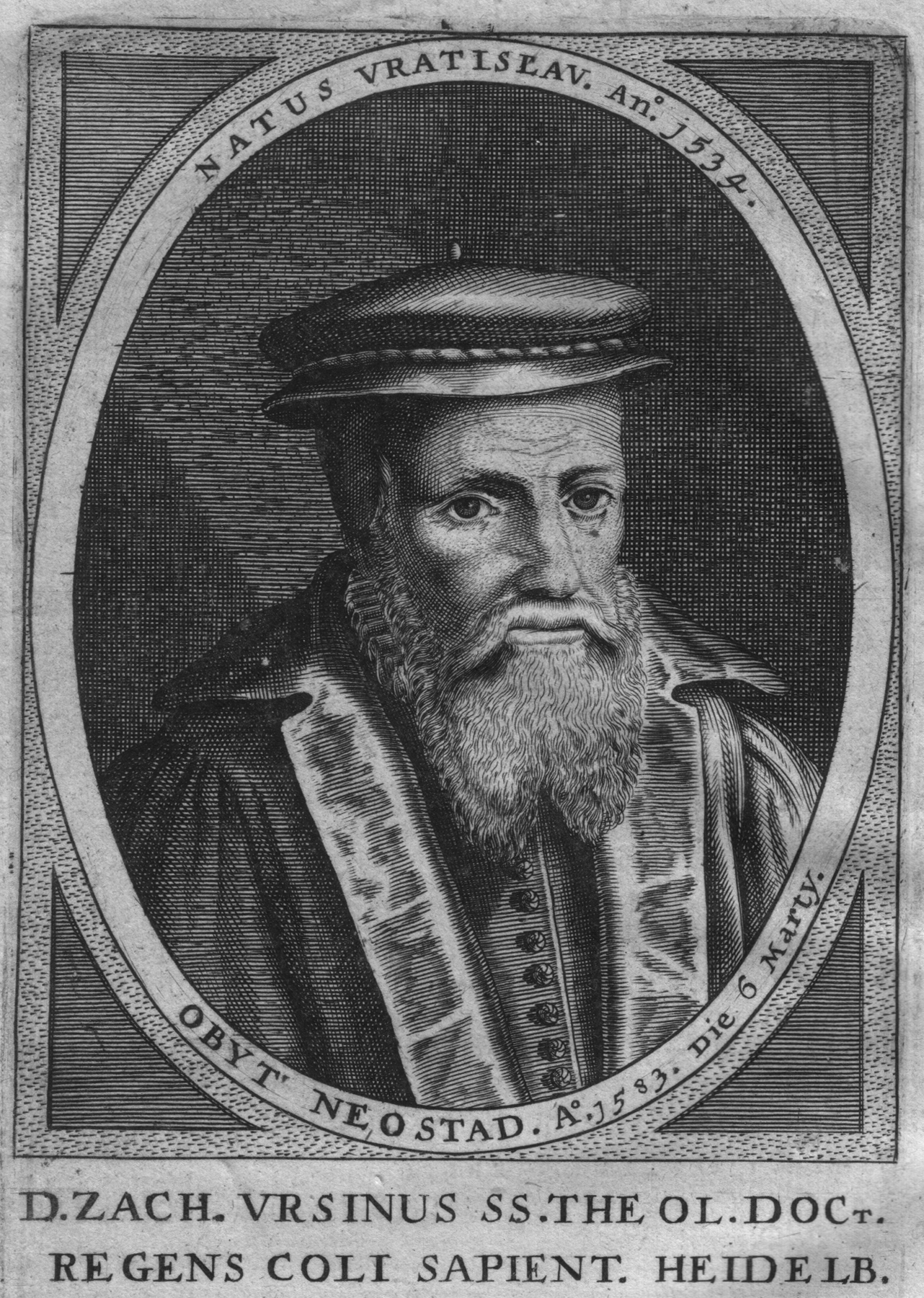
- Born: 18 July 1534; Breslau, Silesia, Bohemia, Habsburg monarchy
- Died: 6 May 1583 (aged 48); Neustadt an der Weinstraße, Electoral Palatinate, Holy Roman Empire
- Occupation: Theologian/Professor
- Notable work: Heidelberg Catechism

Zacharias Ursinus (born Zacharias Baer; 18 July 1534 – 6 May 1583) was a German Reformed theologian and Protestant reformer. He became the leading theologian of the Reformed Protestant movement of the Palatinate, serving both at the University of Heidelberg and the College of Wisdom (Collegium Sapientiae). He is best known as the principal author and interpreter of the Heidelberg Catechism.

== Origins and early education ==
Zacharias Baer was born on 18 July 1534 in Breslau in Silesia, Bohemia, Habsburg monarchy (now Wrocław, Poland). At age fifteen he enrolled at the University of Wittenberg, boarding for the next seven years with Philipp Melanchthon, the erudite successor of Martin Luther. Like many young scholars of that era he gave himself a Latin name, in his case one that was based on his German name, Baer, stemming from Latin ursus, meaning bear. Melanchthon admired young Ursinus for his intellectual gifts and his spiritual maturity, commending him to mentors throughout Europe. He was a lifelong protégé of the prominent imperial physician Johannes Crato von Krafftheim, who likewise hailed from Wrocław. Subsequently, Ursinus studied under Reformation scholars at Strasbourg, Basel, Lausanne, and Geneva. Sojourns in Lyon and Orléans gave him expertise in Hebrew, as well as studying under Jean Mercier in Paris. Returning to Wrocław he published a pamphlet on the sacraments, which aroused the ire of Lutherans who charged him with being more Reformed than Lutheran. The Wrocław opponents' vitriolic reaction succeeded in driving him out of the city to Zurich, where he became friends with Zwingli's successor Heinrich Bullinger and the Italian Reformer Pietro Martire Vermigli.

== In Heidelberg and Neustadt ==
In 1561, upon Vermigli's recommendation, Frederick III, Elector Palatine, appointed him professor in the Collegium Sapientiae at Heidelberg, where in 1562/63, having been commissioned by the Prince elector, he supplied the preliminary drafts for the Heidelberg Catechism and participated in the final revision of the document alongside other theologians and church leaders. Caspar Olevianus (1536–1587) was formerly asserted as a co-author of the document, though this theory has been largely discarded by modern scholarship. The death of the Elector Frederick and the accession of the Lutheran Ludwig IV in 1576, led to the removal of Ursinus, who occupied a professorial chair at the Casmirianum, a Reformed academy at Neustadt an der Weinstraße from 1578 until his death. He died, aged 48, in Neustadt an der Weinstraße (today in Germany).

== Impact ==
His Works were published in 1587–1589, and a more complete edition by his son and two of his pupils, David Pareus and Quirinius Reuter, in 1612. Ursinus's collected catechical lectures (Het Schatboeck der verclaringhen over de Catechismus) was one of the most prominent theological handbooks among seventeenth century Reformed Christians and was especially popular in the Netherlands. Reformed German and Dutch immigrants to North America celebrated his legacy—especially his role in the creation of the Heidelberg Catechism. Ursinus College in Collegeville, Pennsylvania, is a liberal arts college founded in 1869 in his name.
