= Ludwik Birkenmajer =

Polish science historian, physicist and astronomer

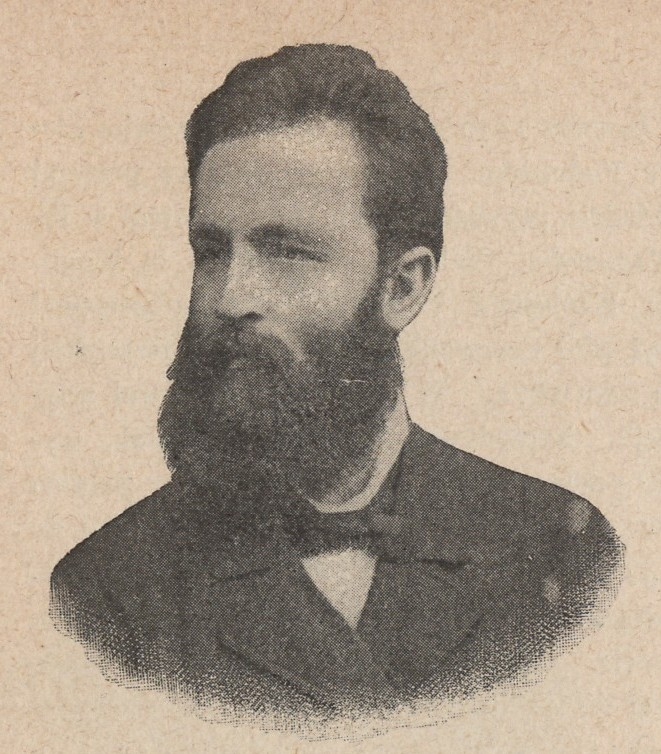
- Portrait of Birkenmajer from the collections of the National Library of Poland
- Born: Ludwik Antoni Birkenmajer; May 18, 1855; Lipsko, Kingdom of Galicia and Lodomeria, Austrian Empire
- Died: November 20, 1929 (aged 74); Kraków, Kraków Voivodeship, Poland
- Resting place: Rakowicki Cemetery
- Occupation: Historian
- Spouse: Zofia née Karlińska
- Children: Aleksander Birkenmajer
- Parent(s): Józef Herman and Petronela née Stefanowski

Academic background
- Thesis: On general methods of the integration of algebraic and transcendental functions (1879)

Academic work
- Discipline: History
- Institutions: Szkoła Praktyczna Gospodarstwa Wiejskiego; Jagiellonian University

Ludwik Antoni Birkenmajer (18 May 1855 – 20 November 1929) was a Polish historian of science, physicist and astronomer. He was professor of the Jagiellonian University.

== Biography ==
Descended from a German family settled in Galicia during the time of the Napoleonic Wars, later a part of the Austrian Habsburg Empire. He was the son of Józef Herman and Petronela née Stefanowski. Educated in the Franz Joseph High School (a so called Gymnasium at that time) in Lemberg (1865–1873), he then studied physics, chemistry and mathematics at the University of Lemberg till 1878. Supplementary studies in Vienna (1879–1880). In 1879 he defended his doctoral thesis in based on the study: On general methods of integration of the algebraic and transcendental functions (Polish: O ogólnych metodach całkowania funkcyj algebraicznych i przestępnych). From 1878, for nearly two decades was a teacher of mathematics and physics in the renowned agricultural school in Czernichów near Kraków. In 1897 he started his academic career at the Jagiellonian University, where he continued to work till the end of his life. At the beginning he was an associate professor, then, from 1919, he became an ordinary professor and lecturer of the history of mathematics, physics, astronomy and physical geography, whilst simultaneously being a Chair of the History of Exact Sciences. In 1893 he was elected the correspondent member of the Academy of Learning, and in 1927 became a regular member. Birkenmajer was one of the organizers of the Library Commission of the Academy (1901). In 1910-1913 he held the post of the secretary of its Commission for the History of Mathematical and Natural Sciences. From 1918 the Academy was renamed the Polish Academy of Arts and Sciences. Birkenmajer was also the member of Scientific Society in Toruń and of the International Astronomical Union in Oxford. In 1923 he took a significant part in the jubilee celebration of the 450th anniversary of the birth of Copernicus with a series of lectures presented in Kraków, Toruń, Poznań and Warsaw.

== Scientific output ==
He analyzed Copernicus's main work De revolutionibus orbium coelestium, and came to the conclusion that the Heliocentric Theory was created by Copernicus before he became acquainted with Ptolemy's Almagest. He also elaborated the biographical materials and records of Copernicus's life till 1500, as well discovering a previously unknown letter of the astronomer to Sigismund I the Old concerning the Teutonic Order. He also studied the scientific output of Marcin Bylica, and prepared a history of geodesy and gravimetry. Birkenmajer prepared the scientific edition of Tito Livio Burattini's Misura universale (1897), the Practical geometry of Marcin Król (1895), as well as the Commentariolum super theoreticas planetarum of Albert Brudzewski (1900). Moreover in his academic interests he studied theoretical physics, astronomy, algebraic functions and geophysics. In 1883 he won the prize of the Kraków Academy in geometry for solving what would (17 years) later be known as Hilbert's third problem, and later received Swedish Order of the Polar-Star, and Polish Commander Cross of the Republic of Poland (1924).

== Birkenmajer family ==
Birkenmajer was the founder of a renowned Polish family of scholars. He was married to Zofia, the daughter of Franciszek Karliński, a professor of astronomy at the Jagiellonian University, and inherited his library embracing mostly the books on mathematics and physics. They had three sons: Aleksander Ludwik (historian of culture and exact sciences, and bibliologist), Józef (poet, interpreter and literature historian), and Wincenty (Polish philologist, teacher and renowned Tatra Mountains-climber). His grandson was Krzysztof Birkenmajer (professor of geology, and member of the Polish Academy of Sciences). In 2011 the Institute for the History of Science of the Polish Academy of Sciences was renemed the Ludwik and Aleksander Birkenmajer Institute of the History of Science of the Polish Academy of Sciences.

== Selected works ==
- O rozszerzalności ciał (1876)
- O całkowaniu algebraicznem funkcyj algebraicznych (1879)
- O przezroczystości powietrza (1879)
- O kształcie i grawitacyi sferoidu ziemskiego (1885)
- Tables des syzygies, calculées à Cracovie pour l'an 1379 et 1380 : contribution à l'histoire de l'astronomie en Pologne du XIVe siècle (1890)
- Marcin Bylica z Olkusza oraz instrumenta astronomiczne, legowane przez niego Uniwersytetowi Jagiellońskiemu w roku 1493 (1892–1893)
- Mikołaj Kopernik. Studya nad pracami Kopernika oraz materyały biograficzne (1900)
- Marco Beneventano, Kopernik, Wapowski a najstarsza karta geograficzna Polski (1901)
- Nicolas Copernic (1902)
- Niccolò Copernico e l'Università di Padova (1922)
- Mikołaj Kopernik jako uczony, twórca i obywatel (1923)
- Stromata Copernicana (1924)
- Mikołaj Wodka z Kwidzyna, zwany Abstemius (1926)
- Nicolaus Copernicus und der Deutsche Ritterorden (1937)

== Source editions ==
- Tito Livio Burattini, Misura universale (1897)
- Giovanni Bianchini, Flores Almagesti : ein angeblich verloren gegangener Traktat Giovanni Bianchini's, Mathematikers und Astronomen von Ferrara aus dem XV. Jahrhundert (1911)
- Barthélemy Berp de Valentia, De diebus naturalibus earumque aequatione (1912)
- Marcin Biem, Martini Biem de Olkusz Poloni nova calendarii Romani reformatio: opusculum ad requisitionem V-ti Concilii Lateranensis A. D. 1516 compositum (1918)
- Mikołaj Kopernik, Wybór pism w przekładzie polskim (1920)
- Mikołaj Kopernik, O obrotach ciał niebieskich i inne pisma (2004)
