= Institute for the History of Science of the Polish Academy of Sciences =

Polish research institute

Coordinates: 52°14′16″N 21°01′06″E

L & A Birkenmajer Institute for the History of Science
- Instytut Historii Nauki PAN imienia Ludwika i Aleksandra Birkenmajerów
- Abbreviation: IHN PAN
- Formation: 1954
- Founders: Bogdan Suchodolski, Aleksander Birkenmajer
- Type: Research institute
- Legal status: Active
- Purpose: Research into the history of science, technology, education, and ideas
- Headquarters: Staszic Palace
- Location: Warsaw
- Official language: Polish
- Head of the Academic Council: Leszek Zasztowt
- Parent organization: Polish Academy of Sciences
- Formerly called: Institute for the History of Science, Education and Technology (mid-1970s–1994)

The Institute for the History of Science was established in 1954 as an institution of the Polish Academy of Sciences in Poland.

== Overview ==
The Institute is located in the Staszic Palace in the center of Warsaw, near the Copernicus monument. Among its founders were professors: Bogdan Suchodolski and Aleksander Birkenmajer. In the mid 1970s, it was renamed to the Institute for the History of Science, Education and Technology. Since 1994, the name has been shortened to the Institute for the History of Science, but with its previous research scope. The head of its present Academic Council is Leszek Zasztowt. Since 2011 the Institute has taken the official name of Ludwik Birkenmajer and Aleksander Birkenmajer: L & A Birkenmajer Institute for the History of Science (Polish: Instytut Historii Nauki PAN imienia Ludwika i Aleksandra Birkenmajerów).

== Structure ==
The Institute consists of two departments: the Department of the History of Social Sciences, History of Education and Scholarly Institutions (Sections: History of Social Sciences, History of Education, History of Scientific Organizations), and the Department of the History of Exact Sciences, Natural Sciences and Technology (Sections: History of Exact Sciences and Technology, History of Medicine, History of Chemistry and Pharmacy, History of Mathematics).

== Field of interest ==
The Institute conducts research focused on the history of science, both humanities and social sciences as well as natural and exact sciences, and the history of technology. The history of culture and history of education and pedagogical thought are also main research fields, equally with the history of ideas and its philosophical milieu.

== Notable academics ==
- Aleksander Birkenmajer
- Paweł Czartoryski
- Tadeusz Kowalik
- Jerzy Michalski
- Jerzy Osiatyński
- Bolesław Skarżyński
- Ryszard Terlecki
- Bogdan Suchodolski
- Leszek Zasztowt

== Series editions ==
- Nicolaus Copernicus, Opera omnia, Vol. I–IV, 1973–2007; editor Aleksander Birkenmajer and Paweł Czartoryski, and successors.
- History of Polish Science (Historia nauki polskiej, in Polish, Vol. I–X, 1970–2015; and continuation, editor Bogdan Suchodolski and successors.
- Studia Copernicana, Vol. I–XLI, 1970–2009; and continuation, editor Paweł Czartoryski and successors.
- Monographs on the History of Science and Technology.
- Monographs on the History of Education, editor Leszek Zasztowt.
- Fontes Rerum ad Historiam Scientiae Spectantium (Sources to the History of Science).
- History of Education Archives, Vol. I–XIII and continuation.

== Journals ==
- Analecta. Studies and Materials for the History of Science ("Analecta. Studia i Materiały z Dziejów Nauki", semi-annual journal published in Polish with English summaries).
- Quarterly Journal for the History of Science and Technology ("Kwartalnik Historii Nauki i Techniki").
- Dissertations on the History of Education ("Rozprawy z Dziejów Oświaty", annual journal publishing articles in Polish, English and Russian).
- Organon, annual journal founded in 1936 and published in English, French, German, Italian and Spanish.

== Bibliography ==
- Instytut Historii Nauki Polskiej Akademii Nauk w latach 1953–2003. Księga jubileuszowa z okazji pięćdziesięciolecia działalności, edited by Joanna Schiller and Leszek Zasztowt, Warszawa 2004.
