= Jerzy Zathey =

Polish historian

Jerzy Krzysztof Stanisław Zathey (15 April 1911 in Kraków – 27 April 1999 in Mszana Dolna) was a Polish historian of Medieval and Renaissance culture, librarian, manuscripts expert. He was a co-originator of the scientific method of elaborating medieval manuscripts. Publisher of numerous source documents (mainly in Latin and Old Polish language).

Zathey was a professor of the Jagiellonian University (since 1983), curator of the National Library of Poland (1938–1944), curator (1945–1981) and director (1957–1981) of Manuscript Department at the Jagiellonian Library, member of Medieval Academy of America (since 1981).

== Notable works ==
- Katalog rękopisów średniowiecznych Biblioteki Kórnickiej (1963)
- Introduction to facsimile edition of Dzieła wszystkie Kopernika ("Copernicus complete works") vol. 1 (1972)
- Catalogus codicum manuscriptorum medii aevi Latinorum, qui in Bibliotheca Jagellonica asservantur vol. 1-4 (collective work; 1980–1988)
