= Aleksander Birkenmajer =

Polish historian

Aleksander Ludwik Birkenmajer
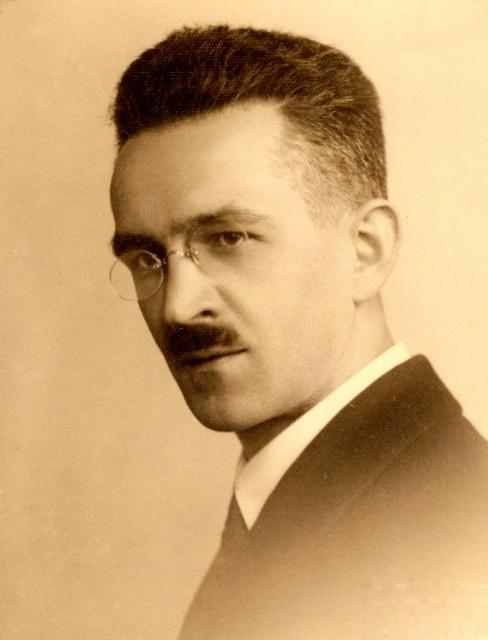
- Born: July 8, 1890; Kraków, Polish Galicia, Austria-Hungary (now Poland)
- Died: September 30, 1967 (aged 77)

Academic background
- Education: Jagiellonian University
- Thesis: Monograph on Henri Bate de Malines (1914)
- Doctoral advisor: Władysław Natanson

Academic work
- Discipline: History of Exact Sciences, History of Philosophy, Bibliology
- Sub-discipline: Medieval and Renaissance Science, Copernicus Studies, Aristotelianism
- Institutions: Jagiellonian University; Jagiellonian Library; University of Poznań Library; Warsaw University; Polish Academy of Sciences
- Notable works: Critical edition of Copernicus's De revolutionibus (1953)

Aleksander Ludwik Birkenmajer (8 July 1890 – 30 September 1967) was a Polish historian of exact sciences and philosophy, bibliologist, professor of the Jagiellonian University in Kraków and of the Warsaw University.

== Biography ==
He was the son of astronomer and historian of science Ludwik Antoni Birkenmajer. Aleksander was educated in Chernikhov and in the Jesuit high school in Chyrow. In 1908-1912 he studied classical philology, physics, mathematics and history at the Jagiellonian University in Kraków. In 1914 defended there his PhD thesis based on the monograph about Henri Bate de Malines as an astronomer and philosopher of the 13th century, and annotated to him, Critics of the King Alphons tables (Alfonsine tables). The dissertation was prepared under the supervision of Władysław Natanson. During the studies he also worked in the Jagiellonian Astronomical Observatory. Since 1919 he cooperated with the Jagiellonian Library, where in 1924 he became a curator of the Department of Manuscripts and Old Prints. After presenting and defending of the next monograph on the Renaissance of mathematical and natural sciences in the Middle Ages he became a professor and the head of the History of Exact Sciences Department of the university in Kraków. In 1938 he became a full extraordinary professor. But earlier in 1931 he resigned the post in the History of Exact Sciences Department to protest against the lack of activity of the Polish Ministry of Religious Denominations and Public Instruction and the Jagiellonian University authorities, because of their absence of endeavors to develop Polish science.

In November 1939 he was arrested and imprisoned in the KZ Sachsenhausen during the Sonderaktion Krakau. Released in the autumn of 1940 he got back to the library as a simple librarian, and struggled to save and secure the collections during the war. In the midst of 1944 he was fired from Library, because some valuable manuscripts - previously destined to be sent to Nazi Germany - had disappeared. After the war he was simultaneously the director of the Jagiellonian Library and the University of Poznan Library, till 1947. In 1951 he became an ordinary professor of Warsaw University, and the head of the Bibliology Chair. He was one of the organizers of the future Institute for the History of Science, Polish Academy of Sciences. In 1954-1966 he conducted its Section of the History of Mathematical, Physico-Chemical and Geological-Geographical Sciences in the Department of the History of Science and Technology of the Polish Academy of Sciences, as well as was the president of its Academic Counsel.

== Scientific output ==
Birkenmajer prepared the first edition of the De revolutionibus of Nicolaus Copernicus (1953). He studied also a scientific output of Witelo, revealed the authorship of the opus Philosophia Pauperum of Saint Albert the Great, he studies Aristotle. He became quickly a renowned international expert in the field of research of Copernicus and Aristotle' heritage. He was member of the Polish Academy of Sciences and Letters in Kraków (1936), International Academy of the History of Science (1935), and its vice-president in 1959–1965, and also a member of the Royal Historical Society in London, and a member of the Association of Czech Librarians in Prague.

== Main books and papers ==
- La bibliothèque de Richard de Fournival et son sort ultérieur (1920)
- Études sur Witelo (1920)
- Kleinere Thomasfragen (1921)
- Henri Bate de Malines astronome et philosophe du 13e siècle (1923)
- Zur Bibliographie Alberts des Grossen (1924)
- Die Wiegendrucke der physichen Werke Johannes Versors (1925)
- Le rôle joué par les médecins et les naturalistes dans la réception d'Aristote aux XII-e et XIII-e siècles (1930)
- Zur Lebensgeschichte und wissenschaftlichen Tätigkeit von Giovanni Fontana (1395?-1455?) (1932)
- Découverte de fragments manuscrits de David de Dinant (1933)
- Formula (1933)
- Le premier système heliocentrique imaginé par Nicolas Copernic (1933)
- Avicennas Vorrede zum "Liber sufficientiae" und Roger Bacon (1934)
- Diophante et Euclide (1935)
- Eine wiedergefundene Übersetzung Gerhards von Cremona (1935)
- Pierre de Limoges commentateur de Richard de Fournival (1949)
- Mikolaj Kopernik (1954)
- Rober Grosseteste and Richard Fournival (1948)
- L'Université de Cracovie centre international d'enseignement astronomique à la fin du moyen-âge (1957)
- Copernic comme philosophe (1965)
- Les éléments traditionneles et nouveaux dans la cosmologie de Nicolas Copernic (1965)
- Alexius Sylvius Polonus (1593-ca 1653): a little-know maker of astronomical instruments (1968)
- Birkenmajer, Aleksander (1970), Études d'histoire des sciences et de la philosophie du Moyen Age, Studia Copernicana, 1 (in French), Wrocław, Zakład Narodowy im. Ossolińskich, OCLC 593287213
- Birkenmajer, Aleksander (1972), Etudes d'histoire des sciences en Pologne, Breslau Polish Academy of Sciences, OCLC 561206058
- Copernic, Nicolas; Dobrzycki, Jerzy; Jerzy Danielewicz; Domański, Juliusz (1975), Opera omnia.... 2: Nicolai Copernici De revolutionibus libri sex, Varsoviae, OCLC 462411576

== Sources ==
- Andrzej Śródka, Uczeni polscy XIX-XX stulecia (Polish Scientists 19th-20th Century), Vol. I, Warszawa 1994, p. 153-155.
- A.L. Birkenmajer, Ètudes d'histoire des sciences et de la philosophie du moyen âge, Wroclaw 1970, p. V-CIV.
