= Locationes mansorum desertorum =

Manuscript of Nicolaus Copernicus

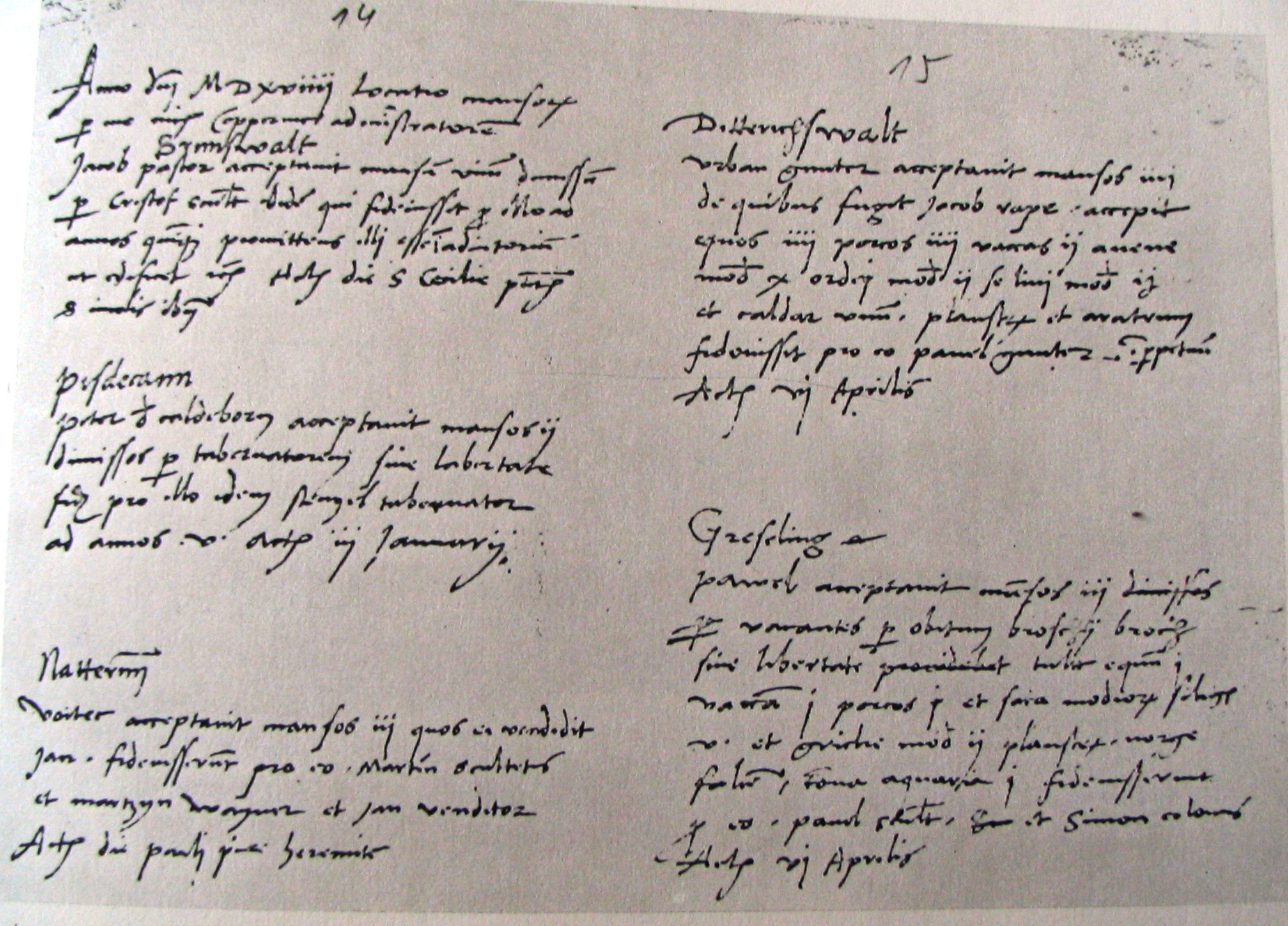
Locationes mansorum desertorum

Locationes mansorum desertorum is a manuscript of Nicolaus Copernicus, written between 1516–1521. It is from ledgers handwritten by Copernicus when he was an economic administrator in Warmia.

== Bibliography ==
- Mikołaj Kopernik, S. Grzybowski, wydanie II, Książka i wiedza, Warszawa 1973.
- Mikołaj Kopernik i jego epoka, J. Adamczewski, Interpress, Warszawa 1972.
- Kopernik, astronomia, astronautyka. Przewodnik encyklopedyczny. pod red. Włodzimierza Zonna, Warszawa, PWN, 1973.
- The Life of Copernicus (1473-1543), Pierre Gassendi, Oliver Thill
