= Collegium Sapientiae =

Academy and theological seminary in Heidelberg, Germany

The Collegium Sapientiae (also Sapience College or College of Wisdom; German: Sapienzkolleg, Sapienz or Sapienz-Collegium) was a preparatory academy and later theological seminary in Heidelberg in the late 1500s (early modern period).

== Early years ==
The Collegium Sapientiae was founded by Elector Frederick II in 1555 on the location of the former Augustinian Cloister in Heidelberg. Frederick received papal permission to redirect ecclesiastical revenues to support this preparatory academy for up to 60 poor students under the oversight of the arts faculty of the University of Heidelberg. Under Elector Otto Henry, the foundation became an explicitly Lutheran institution.

The Reformed Elector Frederick III, the Pious, transformed the school from a preparatory arts academy into a Reformed theological seminary in 1561. With this transformation, administration of the Collegium passed from the university to the church council. Under the leadership of Zacharias Ursinus, the Collegium became a leading center of Reformed theological education in the Holy Roman Empire and enrollments increased. Under Elector Ludwig VI, the institution returned to Lutheranism in 1577, and Reformed students left the school en masse. The institution took on a Reformed character again during and after the regency of Count Palatine Johann Casimir from 1584, and there was a concomitant exodus of Lutheran students. Outstanding faculty in this period included David Pareus,, as well as Heinrich Alting, and Bartholomäus Keckermann. The school closed with the Electorate of the Palatinate military occupation in the Thirty Years War in the 1620s.

== Later years ==
After the restoration of the Palatine Wittelbachs in the aftermath of the war, Elector Karl Ludwig empowered the leading Swiss Scholar Johann Heinrich Hottinger to reopen the Collegium in 1656. The institution again suffered hardship as its structures were destroyed with much of the rest of Heidelberg in the Palatine Succession War in 1693. The school reopened in 1707 and continued in a humbler fashion until its final dissolution in 1805.

== See also ==
Heidelberg Catechism
