= Jagiellonian Library =

Library of the Jagiellonian University in Kraków

- Biblioteka Jagiellońska

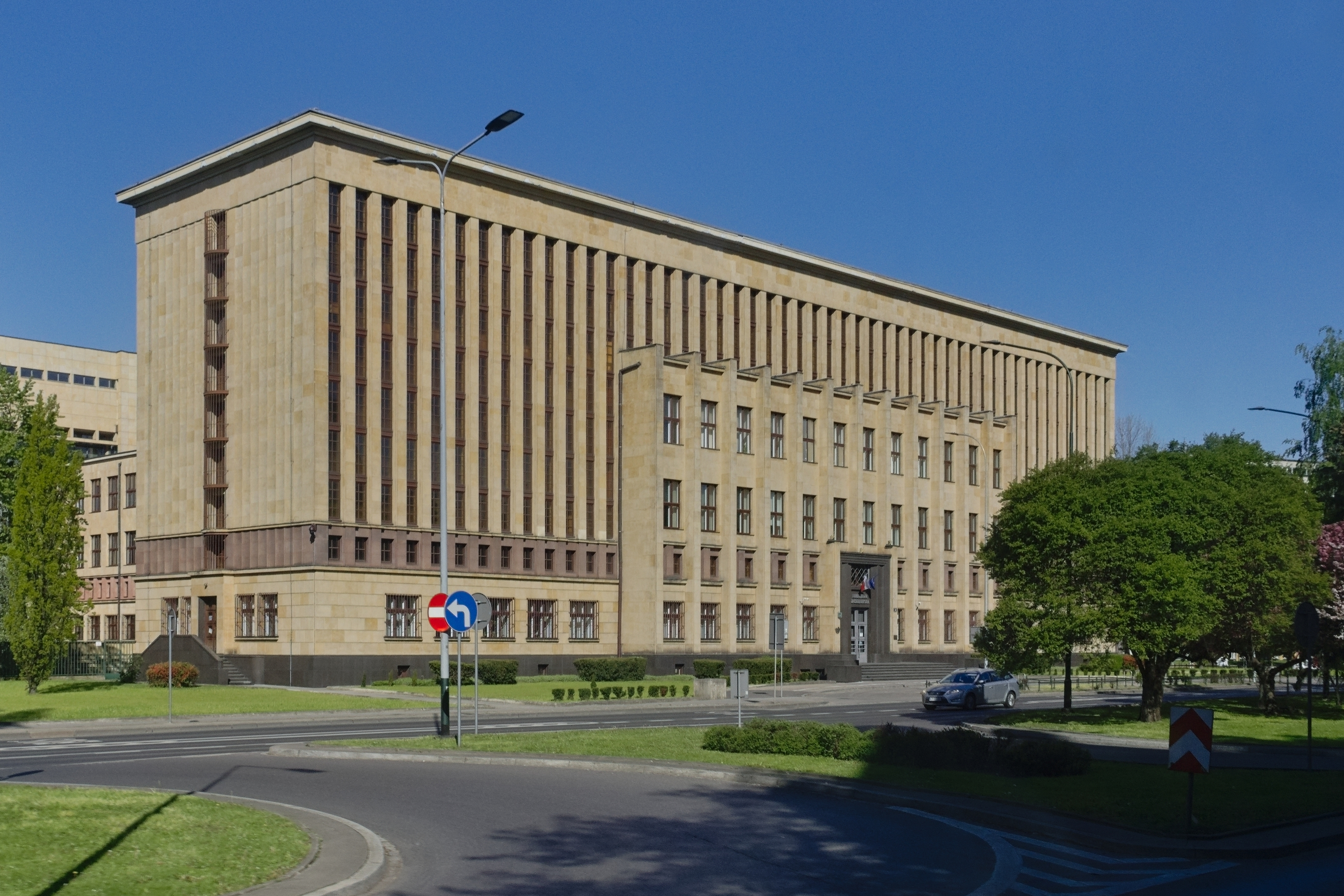
- Jagiellonian Library main building (since 1938)
- 50.0615°N 19.9236°E
- Location: Kraków, Poland
- Type: National library
- Established: 1364 (662 years ago)

Collection
- Size: 6,603,824

Access and use
- Circulation: 600,198 in reading rooms and outside

Other information
- Director: Prof. dr hab. Zdzisław Pietrzyk
- Website: www.bj.uj.edu.pl

The Jagiellonian Library (Polish: Biblioteka Jagiellońska, popular nickname Jagiellonka) is the library of the Jagiellonian University in Kraków and with almost 6.7 million volumes, one of the largest libraries in Poland, serving as a public library, university library and part of the Polish national library system. It has a large collection of medieval manuscripts, for example the autograph of Copernicus' De Revolutionibus and Jan Długosz's Banderia Prutenorum, and a large collection of underground literature (so-called drugi obieg or samizdat) from the period of communist rule in Poland (1945–1989). The Jagiellonian also houses the Berlinka art collection, whose legal status is in dispute with Germany.

== Organization ==
The deputy directors of Administration and Construction, 19th and 20th Century Materials, and Special Collections oversee a staff of 283 employees in fourteen different library departments.

== Collections ==
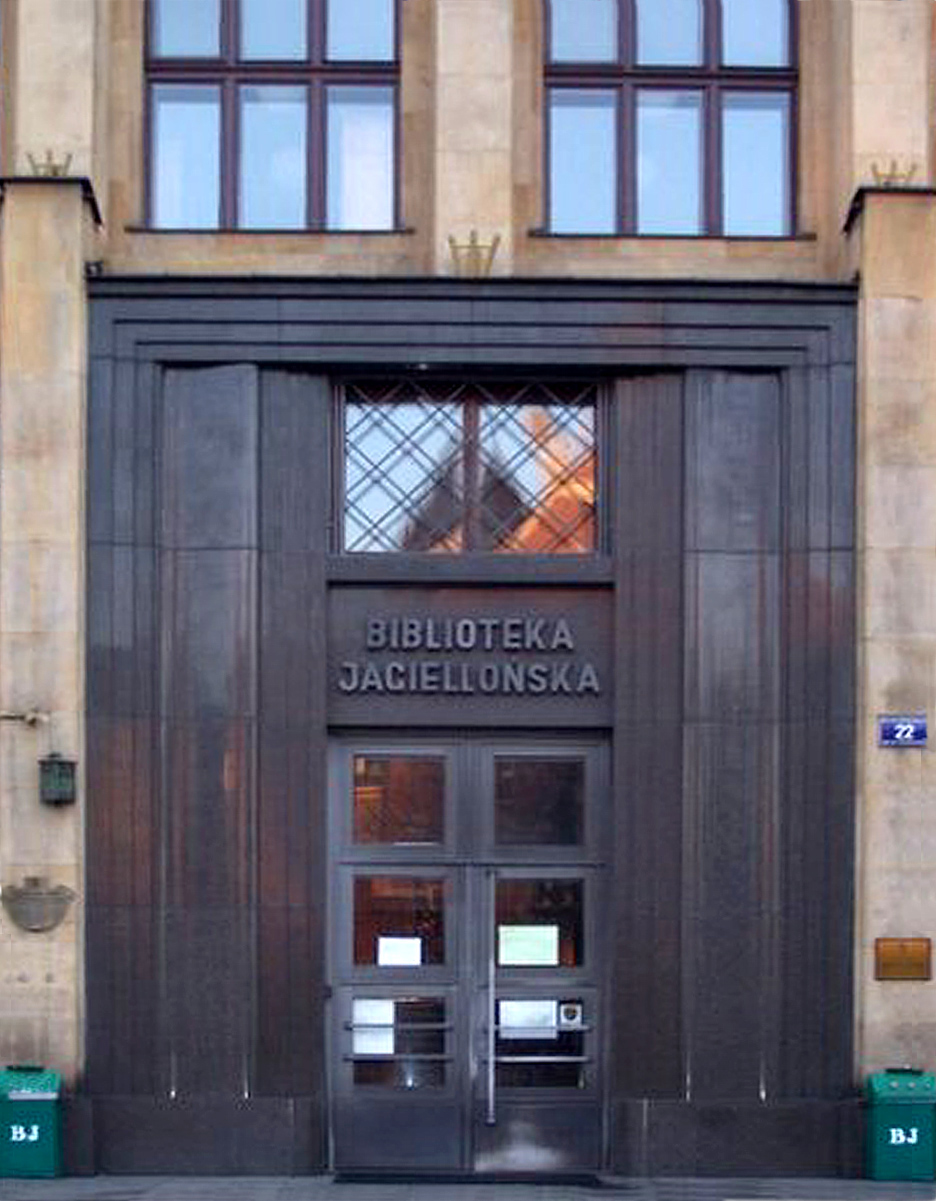
Main entrance to the library

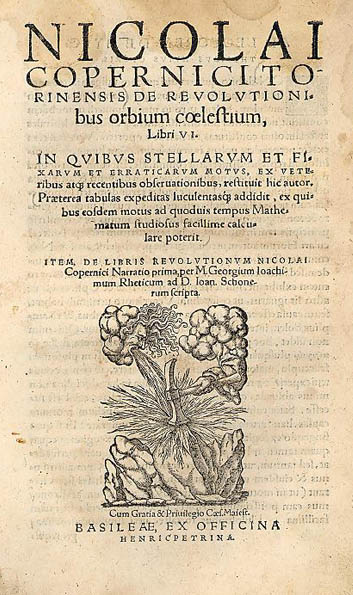
Copernicus' De Revolutionibus is one of many valuable possessions of the library

Jagiellonian Library is one of the largest and most famous libraries in Poland; over its history it has received many donations and inherited many private collections.

Its collection contains 1,503,178 volumes of monographs, 557,199 volumes of periodicals, 104,012 early printed books, 3,586 incunabula, 24,258 manuscripts, 12,819 maps, 35,105 music scores, and 77,336 microforms. Among its music scores are many of Mozart's original autographs. “It was not until 1869 when the donation of Leon Rogalski from Warsaw became the foundation of a separate section of musical notes.” (para 1)

Notable rare manuscripts and books owned by the library include:

- 15th century copy of Bogurodzica
- Jan Długosz – Banderia Prutenorum
- Balthasar Behem Codex
- Paulus Paulirini de Praga – Liber viginti artium
- Nicolaus Copernicus – manuscript of De revolutionibus, and printed editions
- Rembrandt van Rijn – Faust
- Ludwig van Beethoven – Symphony No. 7 and Piano Trio, Op. 97 (Archduke Trio)
- Frédéric Chopin – Scherzo in E major, Op. 54 and the Barcarolle, Op. 60
- Adam Mickiewicz, Pan Tadeusz, first edition, Paris 1834, Sonety, Moscow 1824.
- Stanisław Moniuszko – Trzeci śpiewnik domowy. Muzyka wokalna z towarzyszeniem fortepianu
- Juliusz Słowacki, Poezje Vol. 1–3, Paris 1833.
- Stanisław Wyspiański – Wesele. Dramat w 3 aktach
- Ignacy Jan Paderewski – Stara Suita

The library possess one of the most prominent collections of music autographs by Wolfgang Amadeus Mozart, which includes among others piano concertos K. 246, K. 271, K. 413, K. 414, K. 415, K. 449, K. 451, K. 453, Rondo for Piano and Orchestra, K 382, Concerto for 3 Pianos, K. 242, Concerto for 2 Pianos, K. 365, Concerto for Flute and Harp, K. 299, horn concertos K. 417 and 412, piano sonatas K. 279, 280, 281, 282, 283, 284 and 330, piano trios K. 254, 542, and 564, string quartets K. 80, 169, 171 and 173, String Quintet, K. 516, Flute Quartet K. 285, Divertimento K. 287, symphonies 16, 38 and 39, Exsultate, jubilate, Vesperae solennes de confessore, the Coronation Mass, Bastien und Bastienne, Die Entführung aus dem Serail (acts I and III), Le nozze di Figaro (acts III and IV), Così fan tutte (act I) and two numbers from act I of La clemenza di Tito.

== History ==
The beginning of the Jagiellonian Library is traditionally considered the same as that of the entire university (then known as Cracow Academy) - in the year 1364; however instead of having one central library it had several smaller branches at buildings of various departments (the largest collection was in Collegium Maius, where works related to theology and liberal arts were kept).

"In 1399 a generous endowment to the Academy made by Władysław II Jagiełło (Jogaila) and his consort Jadwiga made possible the reorganization of the Academy into a centralized institution of learning with a library." (p 95) Queen Jadwiga championed the library and bequeathed much of her wealth to help the university flourish in 1400.

The library was growing at a rapid pace without the funds for more space until in 1492, a major part of the Collegium Maius (the academy's library) was destroyed in a fire. This prompted a need to rebuild the library, but the academy did not want to finance it. Instead, the poor faculty members decided to fund the project themselves. A contract was struck with a building crew, but financial issues still presented an obstacle, until chests of money were excavated during construction. A total of five chests were found, one in 1494, and the other four between 1515 and 1518. This helped not only rebuild the library, but purchase more acquisitions as well.

After 1775, during the reforms of Komisja Edukacji Narodowej, which established the first Ministry of Education in the world, various small libraries of the university were formally centralized into one public collection in Collegium Maius. During the partitions of Poland, the library continued to grow thanks to the support of such people as Jerzy Samuel Bandtkie, Karol Józef Teofil Estreicher and Karol Estreicher. Its collections were made public in 1812. Since 1932, it has had the right to receive a copy of any book issued by Polish publishers within Poland. In 1940, the library finally obtained a new building of its own. During the Second World War, library workers cooperated with underground universities.

It wasn't until the 19th century that the university and therefore library was dubbed, "Jagiellonian" after the Jagiellonian dynasty. Since the 1990s, the library's collection is increasingly digital.

== Building ==
The current building of the library located at Al. Mickiewicza 22 was constructed in the years 1931-1939 and expanded twice, in the years 1961-1963 and 1995–2001.

== Thefts from the collections ==
In the 1990s, a number of priceless books were stolen from the library, presumably in order to be sold in the West. One of the worst such outbreaks in Poland was made public in April 1999. It included the theft of works by Galileo Galilei, Johannes Kepler and Bessarion. Some were recovered from an auction in the German auction house Reiss&Sohn. It remains unclear who was behind the operation.

== See also ==
- National Library of Poland
- Ossolineum
- Załuski Library
- List of libraries in Poland
