= Banderia Prutenorum =

Emblazonment of the Order of Teutonic Knights

Emblazonment of the Order's Grand Master

The Banderia Prutenorum is a manuscript of 48 parchment sheets, 18.6 by 29.3 cm (7.3 by 11.5 inches), composed by Jan Długosz and illuminated by Stanisław Durink, listing 56 vexillae, or banners, of the Order of the Teutonic Knights. The title means Blazons of the Prussians. Prutenorum is the genitive plural of Pruteni, Prussians.

In Polish the name is Chorągwie Pruskie. Chorągwie can mean banner, standard, or regiment. The heraldic term blazon in English is probably the exact meaning.

== Historical circumstances of the Banderia ==
The work describes the gonfalons, or battle flags, collected from the field after the Battle of Grunwald in 1410 AD. This battle was a major confrontation between the Teutonic Order and the allied forces of Poles and Lithuanians, whom the Order was trying to conquer. At that time, the Order had succeeded in subjecting or eliminating the western Balts, including the Prussians; however, the Teutonic Knights were decisively defeated by the joint forces of the Crown of the Kingdom of Poland and the Grand Duchy of Lithuania under the command of the Polish King Władysław II Jagiełło.

At the end of the battle, the major officers of the Order lay dead on the field beside the standards under which they had fought. Some units escaped with their standards. The Banderia does not describe all the Order's flags. The flags were collected and stored at Wawel Cathedral in Kraków. They are known to have been there in 1603, after which they disappeared. They have been recreated, starting in 1900. In October 2009, as part of the preparations for the battle's anniversary, Polish scholars and artists in Kraków have finished reconstructing all known standards.

== Composition ==
It was probably the Polish historian, Jan Długosz, who commissioned the painter, Stanisław Durink of Kraków, to illustrate the flags in 1448. Długosz then wrote the Latin descriptions. The work thus has the format of a catalog, with an illumination and Latin entry for each flag.

The flag is decorated with a heraldic blazon identifying the comturia, or district, from which the soldiers of that unit came. The blazon might appear in any circumstances, such as in a coat of arms or on a shield, or in any conspicuous place. Its function was that of identification. The rules of heraldry were undoubtedly followed.

The title raises a few questions of language and society. In it a Polish scholar and historian is calling the conquerors of the Prussians by that very name, even though at the beginning of their conquest they found the name odious to them. Old Prussian speakers still lived in substantial numbers in east Prussia. As they were not excluded from military service, some must have fought for the order, and yet they are not distinguished from the Germans in any way.

Banderium is in origin neither Latin nor Polish, but comes from the Germanic. The place names also are in their Germanic forms rather than their Polish ones. Why Długosz, a Polish historian, chose to use the Germanicized Prussian Latin is not clear.

== Location of the manuscript ==
By some miracle, the manuscript survived World War II, even though it was given to Malbork Castle by the Nazis for political purposes. After the war it showed up at a London auction house and was brought to its current location in the library of Jagiellonian University.

== Notes on the work ==
In the scholarly Latin of manuscript terminology, a recto page is "on the right side". The verso or "turned side" (the other side of the page) is therefore a left-hand page. This terminology has nothing to do with Długosz.

Durink states the width (latitudo) and length (longitudo) of each flag in units he calls ulne (classical ulnae). These must be cubits rather than ells; i.e., one ulna is 18 inches by today's standard ell. The flags are generally longer than they are wide.

Page 1 recto bears the following introduction:

Pro libraria universitatis studii Cracouiensis datum per dominum Johannem Dlugosch. Descriptio Prutenicae cladis seu crucigerorum sub Jagellone per Joannem Dlugosz canonicum Cracoviensem. Banderia Prutenorum anno domini millesimo quadringentesimo decimo in festo Divisionis Apostolorum erecta contra Polonie regem Wladislaum Jagyelno et per eundem regem prostrata et Cracouiam adducta ac in ecclesia catedrali suspensa, que, ut sequitur, in hune modum fuerunt depicta.

A translation directly from the Latin is:

Given to the library of the university of study of Cracow by the master John Długosz. Description of the Prussian ruin or (the ruin) of the cross-bearers through Jagiello by John Dlugosz, canon of Cracow. The blazons of the Prussians in the year of the Lord 1410 in the holiday of the Divisio Apostolorum (Dispersal of the Apostles), which were erected against the king of Poland, Wladislaw Jagiello, and were cast down by the same king and brought to Cracow and hung in the church cathedral, were depicted in this manner, as follows.

The description to which Długosz refers is contained in the Latin notes with the flags.

== Comturiae mentioned in the work ==
Culm, Pomesania, Graudenz, Balga, Schonsze, Stargard, Sambia, Tuchel, Stuhm, Nessau, Westphalia, Rogasen, Elbing, Engelsburg, Strasburg, Chełm, Brettchen and Neumark, Braunsberg.
