= Piano concertos by Wolfgang Amadeus Mozart =

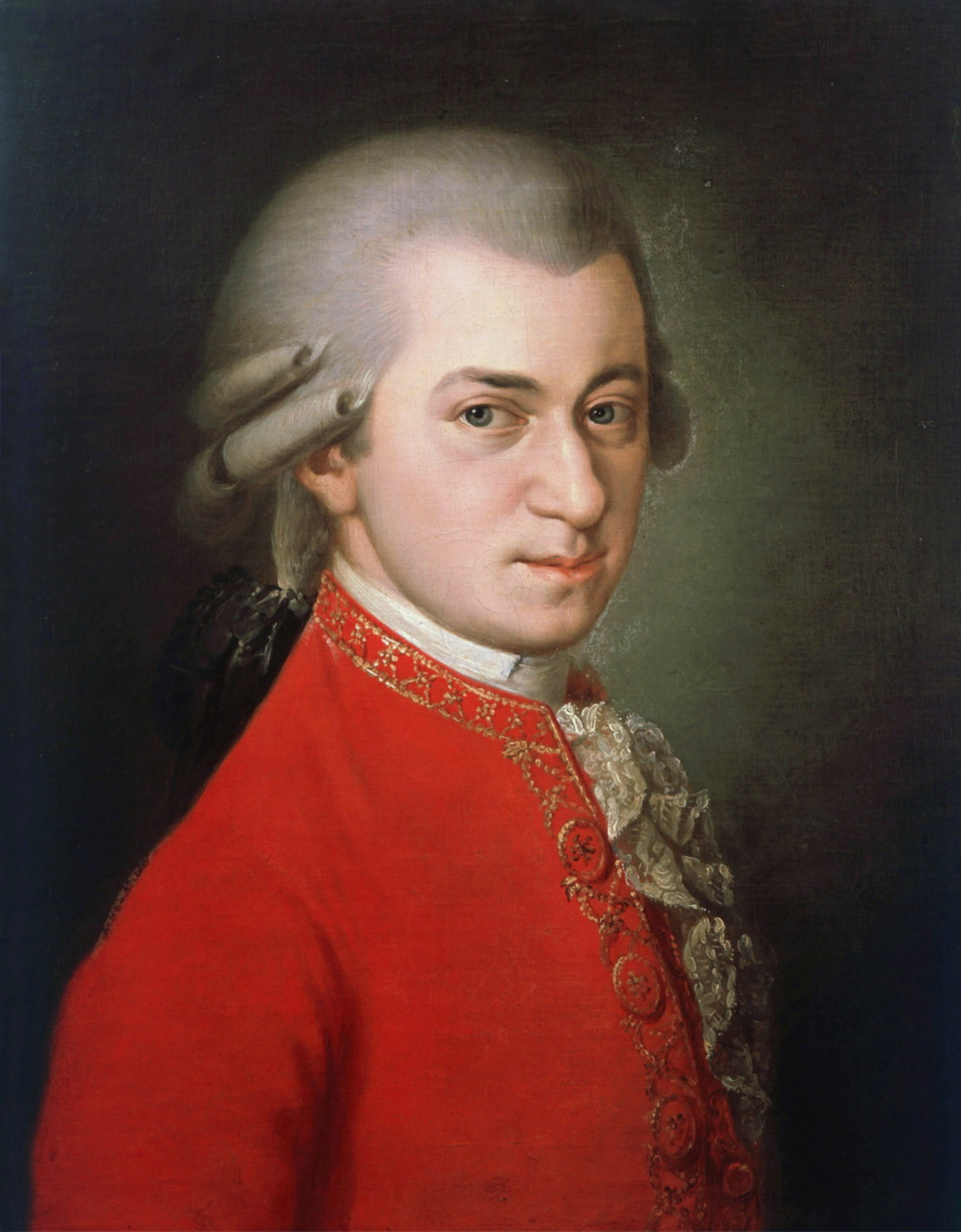
Mozart composed 23 works (plus 7 arrangements) for piano and orchestra from 1773 to 1791

Wolfgang Amadeus Mozart's concertos for piano and orchestra are numbered from 1 to 27. The first four numbered concertos and three unnumbered concertos K. 107 are early works that are arrangements of keyboard sonatas by various contemporary composers. Concertos 7 and 10 are compositions for three and two pianos respectively. The remaining twenty-one are original compositions for solo piano and orchestra. Many of these concertos were composed by Mozart for himself to play in the Vienna concert series of 1784–86.

For a long time relatively neglected, Mozart's piano concertos are recognised as among his greatest achievements. They were championed by Donald Tovey in his Essay on the Classical Concerto in 1903, and later by Cuthbert Girdlestone and Arthur Hutchings in 1940 (originally published in French) and 1948, respectively. Hans Tischler published a structural and thematic analysis of the concertos in 1966, followed by the works by Charles Rosen, and Daniel N. Leeson and Robert Levin.

The first complete edition in print was not until that of Richault from around 1850; since then the scores and autographs have become widely available.

== Piano concertos ==
=== List of concertos ===
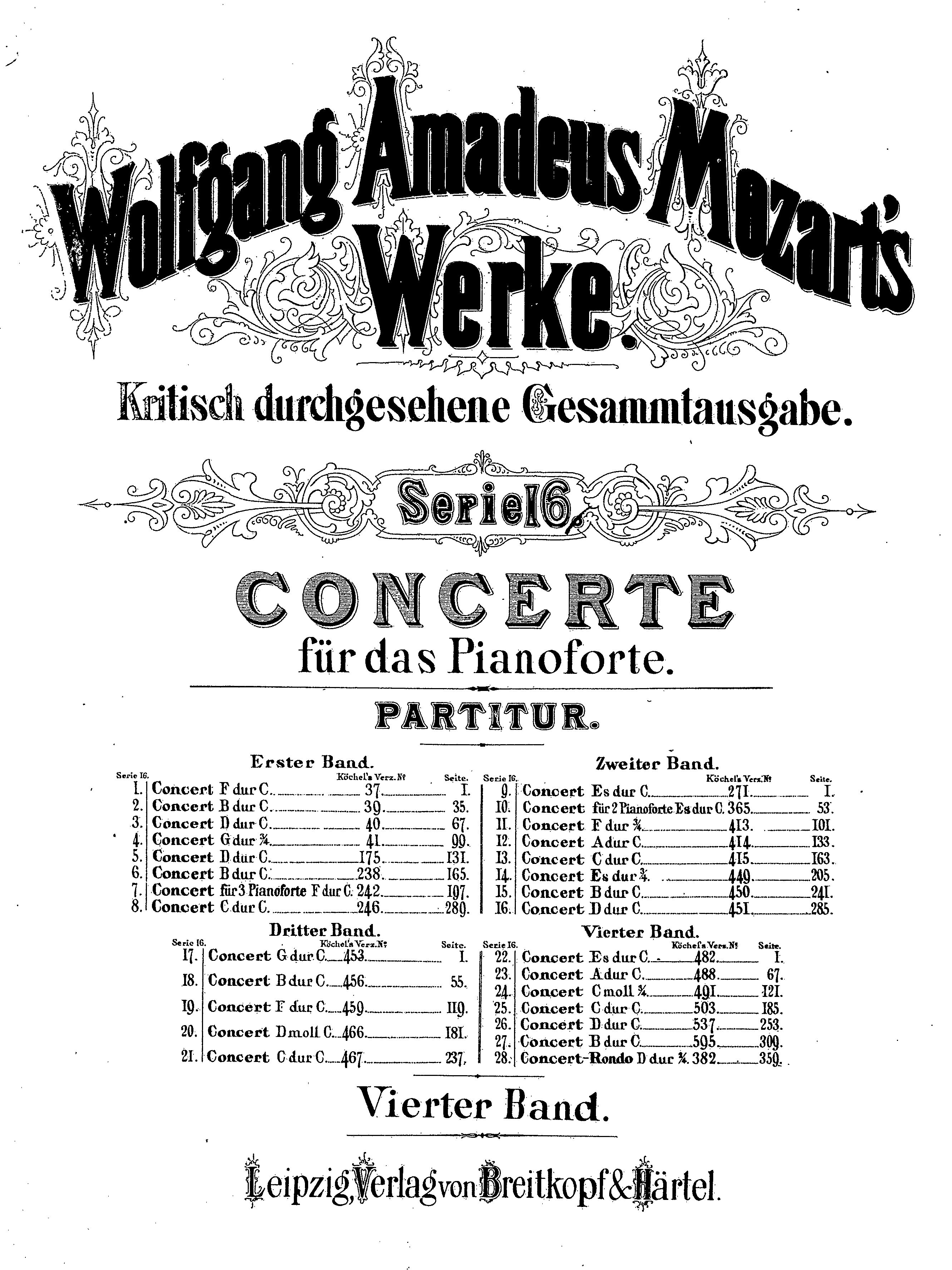
Edition of Mozart piano concertos by Breitkopf & Härtel

Concerto No. 7 is for three (or two) pianos and orchestra, and No. 10 is for two pianos and orchestra, leaving 21 original concertos for one piano and orchestra.

- No. 5 in D major, K. 175 (December 1773)
- No. 6 in B♭ major, K. 238 (January 1776)
- No. 7 in F major, K. 242 ("Lodron") for three pianos (February 1776)
- No. 8 in C major, K. 246 ("Lützow") (April 1776)
- No. 9 in E♭ major, K. 271 ("Jeunehomme" / "Jenamy", January 1777)
- No. 10 in E♭ major, K. 365/316a for two pianos (1779)
- No. 11 in F major, K. 413/387a (1782–1783)
- No. 12 in A major, K. 414/385p (1782)
- No. 13 in C major, K. 415/387b (1782–1783)
- No. 14 in E♭ major, K. 449 (9 February 1784)
- No. 15 in B♭ major, K. 450 (15 March 1784)
- No. 16 in D major, K. 451 (22 March 1784)
- No. 17 in G major, K. 453 (12 April 1784)
- No. 18 in B♭ major, K. 456 (30 September 1784)
- No. 19 in F major, K. 459 (11 December 1784)
- No. 20 in D minor, K. 466 (10 February 1785)
- No. 21 in C major, K. 467 (9 March 1785)
- No. 22 in E♭ major, K. 482 (16 December 1785)
- No. 23 in A major, K. 488 (2 March 1786)
- No. 24 in C minor, K. 491 (24 March 1786)
- No. 25 in C major, K. 503 (4 December 1786)
- No. 26 in D major, K. 537 ("Coronation", 24 February 1788)
- No. 27 in B♭ major, K. 595 (5 January 1791)

=== Origins ===
Early keyboard concertos were written by, among others, C. P. E. Bach, J. C. Bach, Soler, Wagenseil, Schobert, Johann Baptist Wanhal and Haydn. Earlier still, in the Fifth Brandenburg Concerto by J. S. Bach, the keyboard part is elevated to the most prominent position among the instruments. These works, with their alternation of orchestral tutti and passages for solo display, in turn, owe their structure to the tradition of Baroque operatic arias, from which the first movements of Mozart's piano concertos inherited their basic ritornello form.

A similar structure can also be seen in the violin concerto of, for example, Vivaldi, who established the form, along with the three-movement concerto structure, and Viotti, wherein the concerto is divided into six sections. The keyboard parts of the concertos were almost invariably based on material presented in the ritornelli, and it was probably J. C. Bach, whom Mozart admired, who introduced the structural innovation of allowing the keyboard to introduce new thematic material in its first entry.

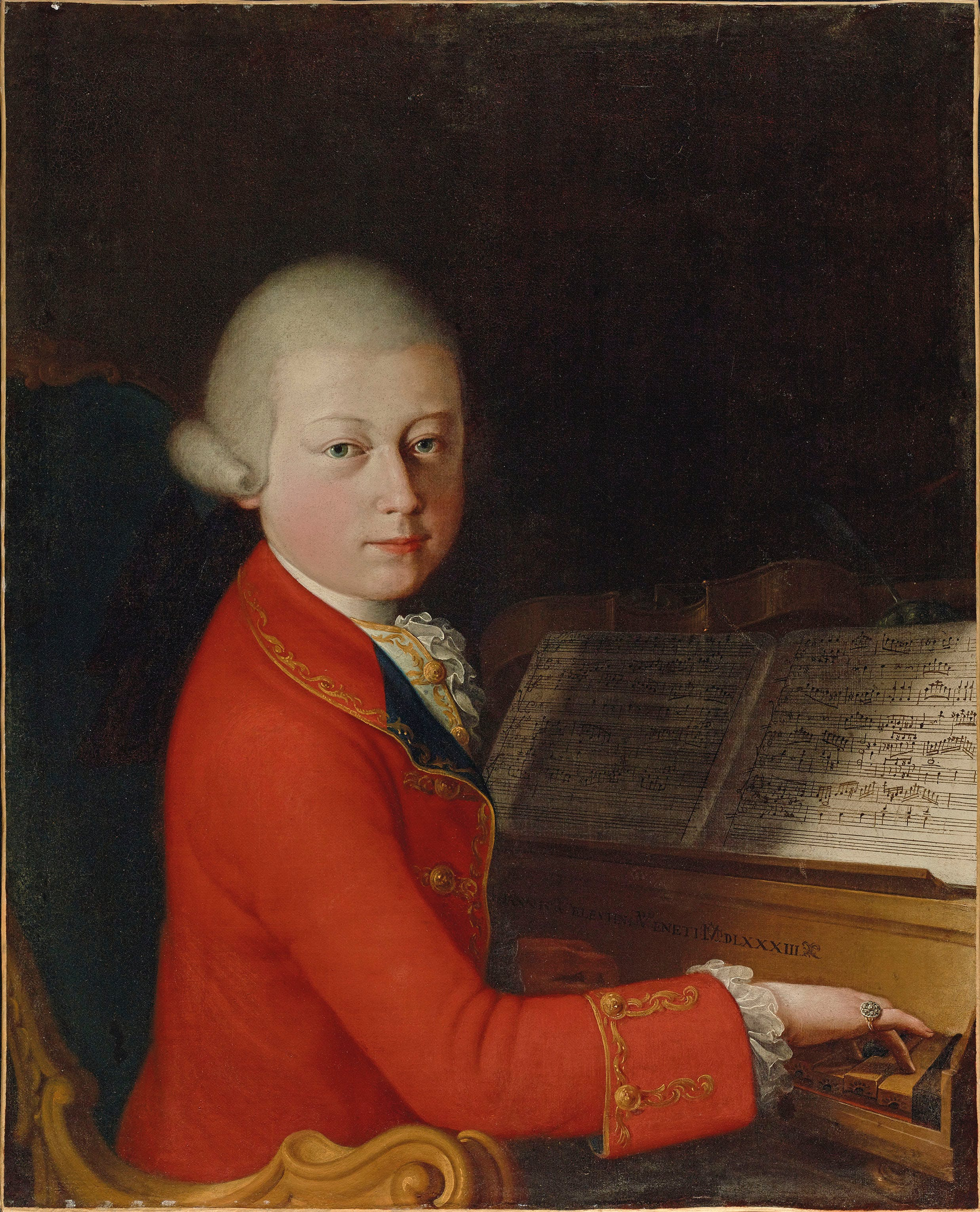
The young Mozart in 1770

=== Salzburg concertos (1767–1779) ===
Concertos Nos. 1–4 (K. 37, 39, 40 and 41) are orchestral and keyboard arrangements of sonata movements by other composers. The next three concertos (K. 107/1, 2 and 3), which are not numbered, are arrangements of piano sonatas by J. C. Bach (Op. 5, Nos. 2, 3, and 4, all composed by 1766). Based on handwriting analysis of the autographs they are believed to date from 1771 or 1772. Concerto No. 5, K. 175 from 1773 was his first real effort in the genre, and one that proved popular at the time. Concerto No. 6, K. 238 from 1776 is the first Mozart concerto proper to introduce new thematic material in the piano's first solo section. Concerto No. 7, K. 242 for three pianos and Concerto No. 8, K. 246 also date from 1776 and are generally not regarded as demonstrating much of an advance, although No. 7 is quite well known.

Nine months after No. 8, however, Mozart produced one of his early masterpieces, the "Jenamy" (formerly "Jeunehomme") concerto, No. 9, K. 271. This work shows a decisive advance in the organisation of the first movement, as well as demonstrating some irregular features, such as the dramatic interruption of the orchestral opening by the piano after only one-and-a-half bars. The final concerto Mozart wrote before the end of his Salzburg period was the well-known Concerto No. 10, K. 365 for two pianos: the presence of the second piano disturbs the "normal" structure of piano-orchestra interaction.

Finally, a fragment of a concerto for piano and violin, K. Anh. 56/315f exists that Mozart started in Mannheim in November 1778 for himself (piano) and Ignaz Fränzl (violin). The project was abandoned when the Elector, Charles Theodore moved the court and orchestra to Munich after succeeding to the Electorate of Bavaria in 1777, and Fränzl stayed behind.

=== Early Vienna concertos (1782–1783) ===
About 18 months after he arrived in Vienna, in the Autumn of 1782, Mozart wrote a series of three concertos for his own use in subscription concerts. He did, however, write, in the spring of that year, a replacement rondo finale in D major, K. 382 for No. 5, a work that proved very popular (on October 19, 1782, he completed another rondo, in A major, K. 386, possibly intended as an alternative ending for No. 12, K. 414). This group of three concertos was described by Mozart to his father in a famous letter:

These concertos [Nos. 11, 12, and 13] are a happy medium between what is too easy and too difficult; they are very brilliant, pleasing to the ear, and natural, without being vapid. There are passages here and there from which the connoisseurs alone can derive satisfaction; but these passages are written in such a way that the less learned cannot fail to be pleased, though without knowing why.... The golden mean of truth in all things is no longer either known or appreciated. In order to win applause one must write stuff which is so inane that a coachman could sing it, or so unintelligible that it pleases precisely because no sensible man can understand it.

This passage points to an important principle about Mozart's concertos, that they were designed in the main to entertain the public rather than solely to satisfy some inner artistic urge.

These three concertos are all rather different from one another and are relatively intimate works despite the mock grandeur of the last one: indeed, arrangements exist for them for piano plus string quartet that lose little. The Piano Concerto No. 12, K. 414 in A major, the second of the series, is particularly fine: it is often described as "Tyrolean", and stands some comparison with the later A major concerto, K. 488. The last of these three, No. 13, K. 415, is an ambitious, perhaps even overambitious work, that introduces the first, military theme in a canon in an impressive orchestral opening: many consider the last movement the best. Like K. 414, it is paralleled by a later concerto in the same key, No. 21, K. 467.

=== Major Vienna concertos (1784–1786) ===
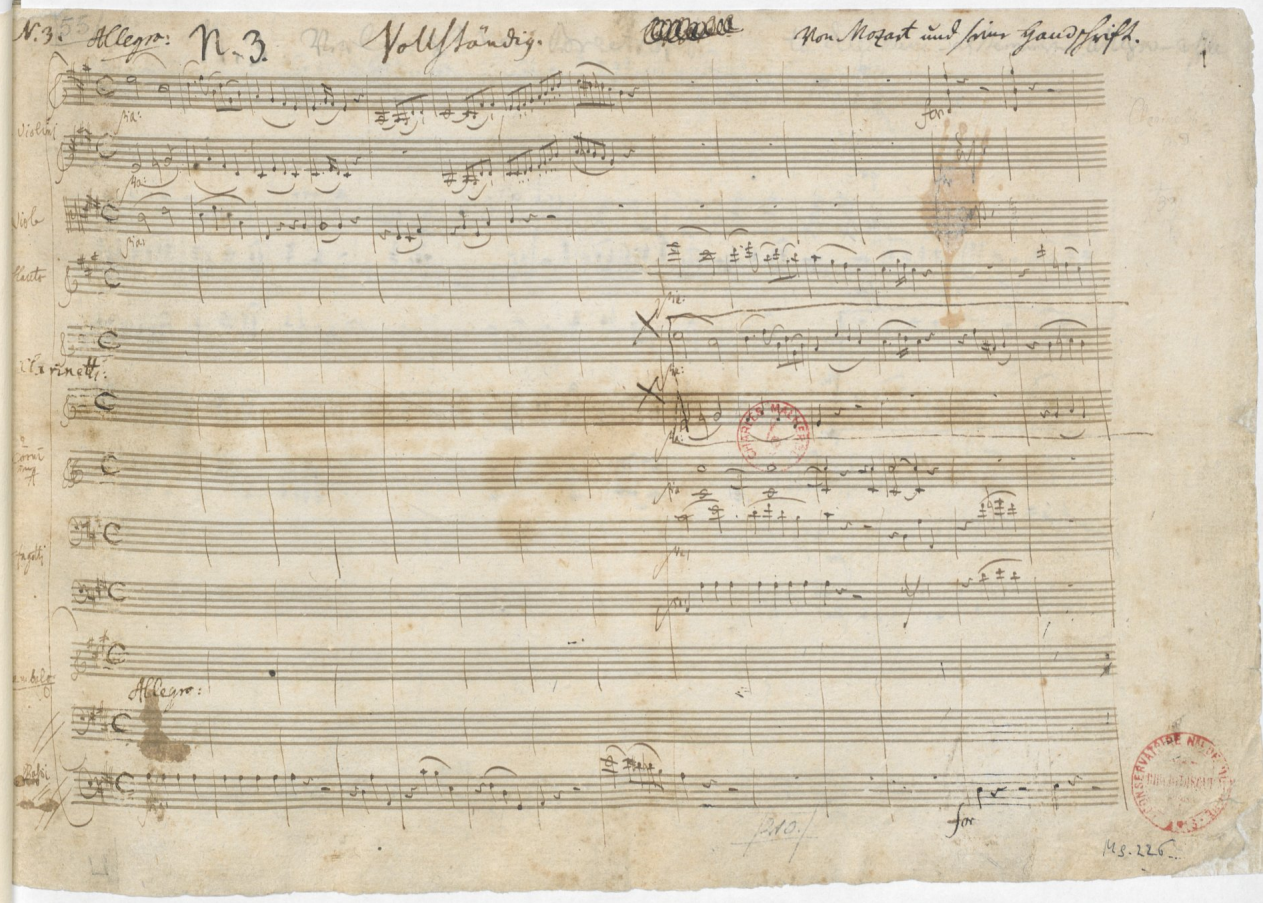
Opening page of Mozart's Piano Concerto No. 23 in A major, K. 488

The next concerto, No. 14 (K. 449) in E♭ major, ushers in a period of creativity that has certainly never been surpassed in piano concerto production. From February 1784 to March 1786, Mozart wrote no fewer than 11 masterpieces, with another (No. 25, K. 503) to follow in December 1786. The advance in technique and structure from the early Vienna examples is marked from the very first of this mature series.

Written for his pupil Barbara Ployer to play, K. 449 is the first instrumental work by Mozart that shows the strong influence of his operatic writing. The next, No. 15 (K. 450), shows a reversion to an earlier, galant style. No. 16 (K. 451) is a not very well known work (Hutchings appears not to have liked it particularly, although Girdlestone ranks it highly). The first movement is broadly "symphonic" in structure and marks a further advance in the interactions between piano and orchestra. Records show that he completed it only one week after the previous work (K. 450).

The next three concertos, No. 17 (K. 453), No. 18 (K. 456), and No. 19 (459), can be considered to form a group, as they all share certain features, such as the same rhythm in the opening (heard also in K. 415 and K. 451). K. 453 was written for Barbara Ployer and is famous in particular for its last movement. The next concerto, K. 456 in B♭, was for a long time believed to have been written for the blind pianist Maria Theresia von Paradis to play in Paris. Finally, K. 459, is sunny with an exhilarating finale.

The year 1785 is marked by the contrasting pair K. 466 (No. 20 in D minor) and K. 467 (No. 21 in C major), again written within the same month. These two works, one the first minor-key concertos Mozart wrote (both K. 271 and 456 have a minor-key second movement) and a dark and stormy work, and the other sunny, are among Mozart's most popular. The final concerto of the year, K. 482 (No. 22 in E♭ major), is slightly less popular. Mozart is not known to have written cadenzas for these concertos.

In 1786, Mozart managed to write two more masterpieces in one month, March: the first was No. 23 in A major K. 488, one of the most consistently popular of his concertos, notable particularly for its poignant slow movement in F♯ minor, the only work he wrote in the key. He followed it with No. 24 in C minor, K. 491, which Hutchings regards as his finest effort. It is a dark and passionate work, made more striking by its classical restraint, and the final movement, a set of variations, is commonly called "sublime." The final work of the year, No. 25 in C major (K. 503), was the last of the regular series of concertos Mozart wrote for his subscription concerts. It is one of the most expansive of all classical concertos, rivaling Beethoven's fifth piano concerto.

=== Later Vienna concertos (1788–1791) ===
The next work, K. 537 (the "Coronation"), completed in February 1788, has a mixed reputation and possibly is the revision of a smaller chamber concerto into a larger structure. Despite its structural problems, it remains popular. Two fragments of piano concertos, K. 537a and K. 537b, in D major and D minor respectively, were also probably begun in this month, although perhaps earlier. Finally, the last concerto, No. 27 (K. 595) was the first work from the last year of Mozart's life: it represents a return to form for Mozart in the genre. Its texture is sparse, intimate and even elegiac.

== The Mozartian concept of the piano concerto ==
In the works of his mature series, Mozart created a unique conception of the piano concerto that attempted to solve the ongoing problem of how thematic material is dealt with by the orchestra and piano. With the exception of the two exceptionally fine early concertos K. 271 (Jeunehomme) and K. 414 (the "little A major"), all of his best examples are from later works. Mozart strives to maintain an ideal balance between a symphony with occasional piano solos and a virtuoso piano fantasia with orchestral accompaniment, twin traps that later composers were not always able to avoid. His resulting solutions are varied (none of the mature series is really similar to any of the others structurally on more than a broad level) and complex.

=== First movement structure ===
The form of Mozart's piano concerto first movements has generated much discussion, of which modern instances were initiated by the highly influential analysis provided by Tovey in his Essay. In broad terms, they consist of (using the terminology of Hutchings):

- Prelude (orchestra)
- Exposition (piano, plus orchestra), ending in a trill in the dominant (for major key concertos) or the relative major (for minor key concertos)
- First Ritornello (orchestra)
- Middle Section (piano plus orchestra)
- Recapitulation (piano plus orchestra)
- Final Ritornello (orchestra, but always including a piano cadenza).

This structure is rather easy to hear when listening, particularly because the ends of the exposition and recapitulation are typically marked with trills or shakes.

It is tempting to equate this structure with sonata form, but with a double exposition; so

- Prelude = 1st exposition
- Exposition = 2nd exposition
- Middle section = development
- Recapitulation + final Ritornello = Recapitulation (piano concerto section first, sonata form section second).

However, while there are broad correspondences, this simple equation does not really do justice to the Mozartian scheme. For example, the piano concerto may well not include a well-defined second group of subjects in the prelude; and in particular, does not include a definitive modulation to the dominant in this section, as might be expected from sonata form, even though Mozart feels free to shift the sense of tonality around in this and other sections. The reason for this, as Tovey remarked, is that the purpose of the Prelude is to generate a sense of expectation leading towards the piano entry, and this must come from the music itself, not just from the title on the top of the page.

If a complete sonata form were imposed on the Prelude, then it would take on a life of its own, so that when the piano entry occurs, it would be rather incidental to the overall structure. To express it in another way, in sonata form, the first group of subjects is linked to and generates an expectation of the second group, which would tend to detract attention away from the piano entry – a point that, as Tovey points out, was only grasped by Beethoven rather belatedly. Conversely, in the Mozartian concept, the piano entry is always a moment of great importance, and he varies it considerably from concerto to concerto. The only exception to this rule is the dramatic intervention of the piano in the second bar of the Jeunehomme Concerto, which is, however, minor enough not to disturb the overall structure.

Rather than the Prelude being a "preliminary canter" (Hutchings) of the themes of the concerto, its role is to introduce and familiarise us with the material that will be used in the ritornello sections, so that we get a sense of return at each of these. Technically, therefore, the ritornello sections should only include themes that are introduced in the Prelude. In practice, however, Mozart allows himself to sometimes vary even this rule. For example, in Piano Concerto No. 19, the first ritornello introduces a new theme, which, however, plays only a minor linking role between the restatements of the first theme.

The prelude is invariably rich in thematic material, with as many as six or more well-defined themes being introduced. However, the concertos fall into two rather marked groups as to what sort of themes they possess. The most popular concertos, such as Nos. 19, 20, 21 and 23 tend to have well-marked themes. However, another group, such as Nos. 11, 16, 22, and 27, the themes are less marked, and the overall effect is of homogeneity. As Mozart's art progressed, these themes sometimes become less strophic in nature, i.e., he binds them together into a more unified whole.

In addition to the ritornello thematic material, Mozart's mature concertos nearly all introduce new thematic material in the piano exposition, the exceptions being K. 488 in A major, which, however, follows an unusual course after this, and K. 537. Hutchings recognises these by labeling ritornello themes A, B, C etc., and expositional themes x, y etc. Mostly these are first introduced by the piano; but sometimes (e.g., theme y of No. 19) the orchestra plays this role. Sometimes the exposition starts with one of these new themes (in piano concertos Nos. 9, 20, 22, 24, and 25), but the exposition can also start by restating one of the prelude themes.

In addition to the preludial and expositional themes, the exposition typically contains various free sections that show off the piano; but, contrary to the popular conception of the piano concerto, and to how it developed in the nineteenth century, these sections are not merely empty displays, but rather, short sections that fit into the overall scheme.

The middle sections, as in much of Mozart's symphonic output, are typically short and rarely contain the sort of development associated with, in particular, Beethoven. In other words, Mozart normally generates his middle sections by shuffling, condensing and modulating his thematic material, but not by taking a simple theme and genuinely developing it into new possibilities. However, as is the case with all generalisations involving his piano concertos, this can be overstated: the middle section of No. 25, for example, can be described as being a genuine development. In other concertos, such as No. 16, there is no such thing.

Mozart's themes are cunningly employed, so that they fit together in various ways. Despite the formal advances in the prelude, the themes are often later used in different orders, so that a scheme of a prelude ABCDE might later become ABADA or something else. Some of the so-called "ritornellic" material of the prelude might indeed never appear again or only appear at the end. For example, in Piano Concerto No. 19, theme C never appears again, while E and F only appear to close the entire movement. This flexibility is of particular importance in the recapitulation, which, though it invariably commences with a restatement of the first preludial theme, is no mere repetition of the preludial themes. Rather, it condenses and varies them so that the listener is not tired by simple reproduction. The genius of Mozart's mature movements, therefore, is to be able to manipulate a mass of thematic material without compromising the broader scale conception; and the listener, rather than being given the impression of "fiddling" with all the themes, instead is left with the ritornellic impression: Mozart truly uses "art to conceal art".

One further point of great importance is the interaction between piano and orchestra. In the earlier concertos, such as the not totally successful No. 13 in C major, and even more so, perforce, in the concertos for two and three pianos, the interaction between the two is limited, but the later concertos develop the subtle relations between them to a high degree; for example, in No. 16, K. 451. His later concertos are truly described as concertos for "piano and orchestra" rather than the more obviously "piano" concertos of the nineteenth century (e.g., that of Grieg etc.).

Because Mozart was developing the form of his concertos as he wrote them and not following any preconceived "rules" (apart, presumably, from his own judgement of taste), many of the concertos contravene one or other of the generalisations given above. For example, K. 488 in A major lacks new expositional material, and "merely" repeats the preludial material; further, it effectively merges the first ritornello and the middle section, as does K. 449 in E♭. Several of the later concertos do not hesitate to introduce new material in the supposedly "ritornellic" sections, such as in K. 459, 488, and 491, or, indeed, in the middle section (K. 453, 459, and 488).

=== Second movement structure ===
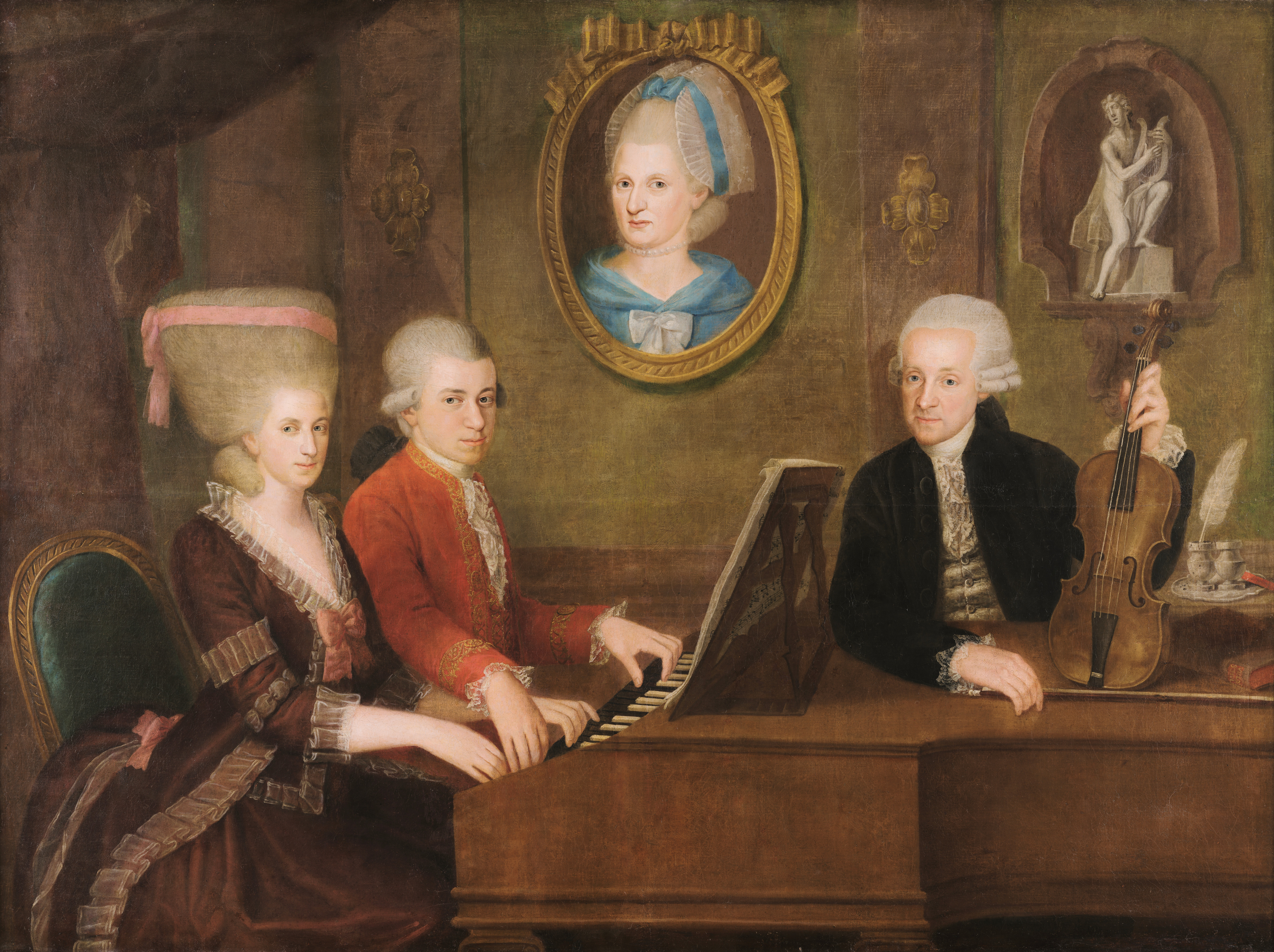
The Mozart family, c. 1780. The medallion on the wall is of Mozart's mother.

Mozart's second movements are varied, but may be broadly seen as falling into a few main categories. Most of them are marked Andante, but he himself marked at least the poignant F♯ minor (K. 488) one Adagio, presumably to stress its pathetic nature rather than to dictate a particularly slow speed. Conversely, the slow movement of the sunny No. 19 in F major is marked Allegretto, in keeping with the mood of the entire concerto. Hutchings gives the following list of movement types (slightly modified):

- K. 175: Sonata form
- K. 238: Aria-sonata
- K. 242: Sonata
- K. 246: Aria
- K. 271: Aria
- K. 365: Binary dialogue
- K. 413: strophic binary aria
- K. 414: strophic binary aria
- K. 415: Ternary with coda
- K. 449: strophic binary aria
- K. 450: Variations with coda
- K. 451: Rondo
- K. 453: Aria (Sonata)
- K. 456: Variations
- K. 459: Sonata (but without development)
- K. 466: Romanza (Rondo, marked Romance without further Tempo Indication)
- K. 467: Irregular
- K. 482: Variations
- K. 488: Ternary
- K. 491: Romanza (Rondo)
- K. 503: Sonata without development
- K. 537: Romanza
- K. 595: Romanza

Girdlestone puts the slow movements into five main groups: galant, romance, dream, meditative, and minor.

=== Third movement structure ===
Mozart's third movements are generally in the form of a rondo, the customary, rather light structure for the period. However, two of his most important finales, that to K. 453, and to K. 491, are in variation form, and they are both generally considered among his best. In addition, three more concertos, K. 450, 451 and 467 can be regarded as being in rondo-sonata form, with the second theme modulating to the dominant or relative major. However, the simple refrain-episode-refrain-episode-refrain structure of a rondo does not escape Mozart's revising attentions.

The difficulty for Mozart with the typical rondo structure is that it is naturally strophic; i.e., the structure is divided into a series of highly differentiated and distinct sections. However, such a structure does not lend itself to creating an overall unity in the movement, and Mozart thus attempts various ways (with greater or lesser success) of overcoming this problem. For example, he may have complex first themes (K. 595), contrapuntal treatment (K. 459), or rhythmic and other variation of the theme itself (K. 449). In general, Mozart's third movements are as varied as his first movements, and their relation to a "rondo" is sometimes as slender as having a first tune (refrain) that returns.

=== Similar works by other composers ===
Mozart's large output of piano concertos put his influence firmly on the genre. Joseph Haydn had written several keyboard concertos (meant for either harpsichord or piano) in the earlier galant style, but his last keyboard concerto, No. 11 in D, is much more obviously Mozartian, having been written considerably later and concurrently with Mozart's output. Joseph Wölfl contributed several piano concertos shortly after Mozart's death that also clearly showed Mozart's influence. Beethoven's first three concertos also show a Mozartian influence to a somewhat lesser extent; this is also true of Carl Maria von Weber, J.N. Hummel, John Field, and others.

== Performance considerations ==
The performance of Mozart's concertos has become a topic of considerable focus in recent years, with various issues such as the size of the orchestra and its instrumentation, the cadenzas, role of the soloist as continuo and improvisation of the written piano part all coming under scrutiny.

=== Orchestra ===
Mozart's concertos were performed in his lifetime in a variety of settings, and the orchestra available no doubt varied from place to place. The more intimate works, for example, K. 413, 414, and 415, were ideal for performance in the salon of an aristocratic music-lover: Mozart himself advertised them as possible to play "a quattro", i. e. with just a string quartet accompanying the piano.

In larger settings, such as halls or the theatre (or indeed, outdoors), larger orchestral forces were possible, and indeed a requirement for the more richly scored concertos such as K. 503. In particular, the later concertos have a wind band that is absolutely integral to the music. An extant theatre almanac from 1782, from the Burgtheater in Vienna, suggests that, for the theatre, there were 35 members of the orchestra, e.g., six first and six second violins; four violas; three cellos; three basses; pairs of flutes, clarinets, oboes, and bassoons; natural horns; and trumpets, with a timpanist.

=== Piano ===
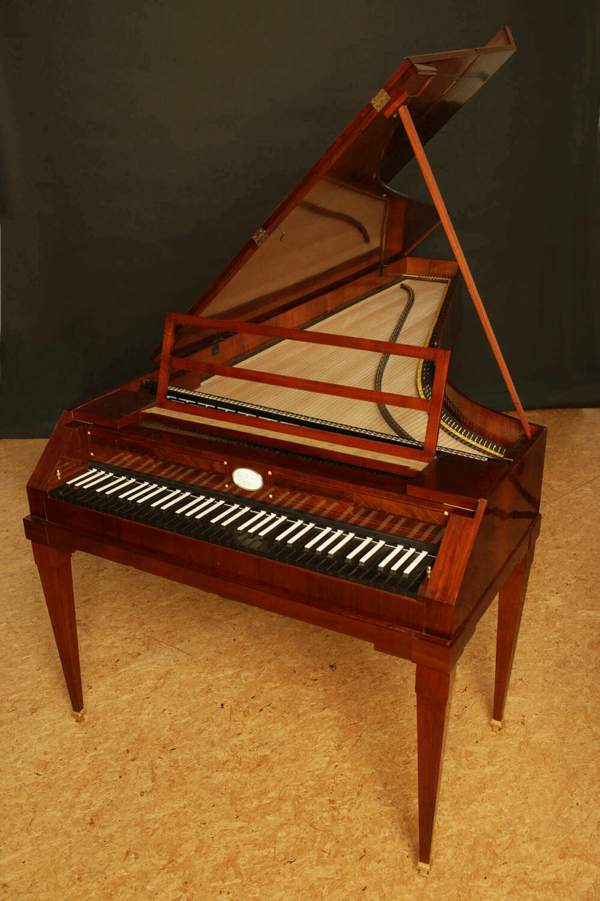
Fortepiano by Paul McNulty after Walter & Sohn, ca. 1805

All of Mozart's mature concertos were concertos for the piano and not the harpsichord. His earliest efforts from the mid-1760s were presumably for the harpsichord, but Broder showed in 1941 that Mozart himself did not use the harpsichord for any concerto from No. 12 (K. 414) onwards. In fact, Mozart's original piano was returned to Vienna in 2012 after a 200-year absence and was used in a concert shortly after its return. This is the same piano that Mozart kept at his home and brought through the streets for use at various concerts.

Although early Viennese pianos were in general rather lackluster instruments, the fortepianos made by Mozart's friend Stein and Anton Walter, instruments that Mozart much admired, were much more suitable for Mozart's purposes. The fortepianos were much quieter instruments than the modern concert grand piano, so that the balance between the orchestra and soloist may not easily be reproduced using modern instruments, especially when small orchestras are used. The rise in interest in authentic performance issues in the last few decades has, however, led to a revival of the fortepiano, and several recordings now exist with an approximate reconstruction of the sound Mozart might have himself expected.

==== Continuo role ====
It seems likely, although it is not absolutely certain, that the piano would have retained its ancient keyboard basso continuo role in the orchestral tuttis of the concertos, and possibly in other places as well. That this was Mozart's intention is implied by several lines of evidence. First, the piano part is placed in his autographs at the bottom of the score under the basses, rather than in the middle as in modern scores. Second, he wrote "CoB" (col Basso – with the basses) in the lower stave of the piano part during tuttis, implying that the left hand should reproduce the bass part. Sometimes, this bass was figured too, for example in the early edition of Nos. 11–13 by Artaria in 1785, and Mozart and his father added figuration themselves to several of the concertos, such as the third piano part of No. 7 for three pianos (K. 242), and to No. 8 (K. 246), where Mozart even realised the figuration.

On the other hand, this view is not entirely accepted. Charles Rosen, for example, has the view that the essential feature of the piano concerto is the contrast between the solo, accompanied, and tutti sections; and this psychological drama would have been ruined if the piano was effectively playing the whole time, albeit discreetly. In support of his case, Rosen argued that the published figured bass of No. 13 (K. 415) was error-strewn and thus not by Mozart; that Mozart's realisation of the figuration in No. 8 (K. 246) was for use in highly reduced orchestras (i. e. strings with no wind), and that the "CoB" instruction was for cueing purposes. Conversely, other scholars, notably Robert Levin have argued that real performance practice by Mozart and his contemporaries would have been considerably more embellished than even the chords suggested by the figuration.

A place where the addition of the piano to the orchestra is particularly common is in the last bars after the cadenza, where the orchestra in score plays to the end on its own (except in No. 24, K. 491), but in practice pianists, if only to finish playing at the end, sometimes accompany.

As far as modern practice goes, the matter is complicated by the very different instrumentation of today. The early fortepianos produced a more "orchestral" sound that blended easily into the orchestral background, so that discreet continuo playing could have the effect of strengthening the sonic output of the orchestra without (in effect) destroying the ritornello structure that is the basis for the Mozart piano concerto. Furthermore, when the soloist is directing the orchestra as well, as Mozart would have been, the addition of continuo would help keep the band together.

Finally, the vast majority of performances of Mozart piano concertos heard today are recorded rather than live, with the net effect of flattering the piano's sound (i. e. the blending of the piano and orchestra is harder to achieve in the studio than in the concert hall); hence, continuo playing by the soloist in recordings might be too intrusive and obvious for most tastes. Nevertheless, continuo playing has discreetly appeared in some modern recordings (of the fortepiano) with success, or at least, lack of intrusion (see discography, below).

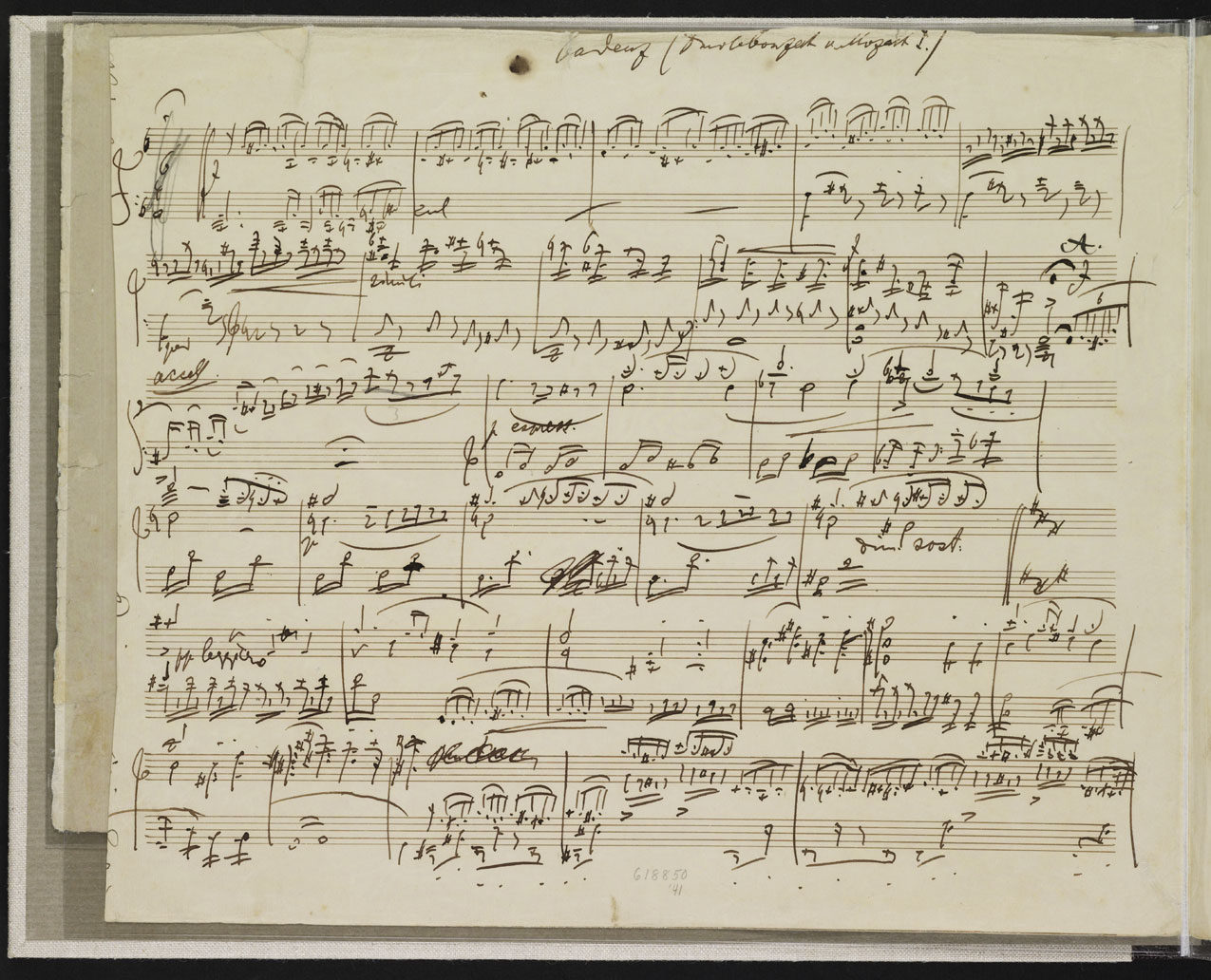
The manuscript of Brahms' cadenza to Mozart's Piano Concerto No. 20

==== Cadenzas ====
Mozart's fame as an improviser (see next section) has led many to suggest that the cadenzas and Eingänge ("lead-ins", i.e. brief cadenza-like passages leading into returns of the main theme in a rondo) were extensively improvised by him during performance. However, against this must be set the fact that Mozart's own cadenzas are preserved for the majority of the concertos, and may have existed for others (e.g., the now missing cadenzas for No. 20, K. 466 and No. 21, K. 467 are possibly mentioned by his father in letters to his sister in 1785). On the other hand, the cadenzas were not supplied as part of the concerto to the publishers, and it would no doubt have been expected that other pianists would supply their own.

Opinion is sharply divided, with some commentators (notably Hutchings) strongly urging the use of Mozart's own cadenzas when available, and when they are not available, for cadenzas to be similar to Mozart's, especially as far as length goes (i.e., short). The sorts of problems that exist are exemplified by the cadenzas written by the young Beethoven for No. 20 in D minor (which has no extant Mozart cadenzas); Hutchings complains that although they are the best option available, the genius of Beethoven shines through them and, by implication, this makes them a "piece within a piece" that tends to distract from the unity of the movements as a whole.

==== Improvisation ====
Perhaps the most controversial aspect of the concertos is the extent to which Mozart (or other contemporary performers) would have embellished the piano part as written in the score. Mozart's own ability to improvise was famous, and he often played from very sketchy piano parts. Furthermore, there are several very "bare" parts in the concerto scores that have led some to deduce that the performer is meant to improvise embellishments at these points, the most notorious being towards the end of the F♯-minor second movement of No. 23 in A major (K. 488) – the end of the first subject of the second movement of No. 24 in C minor, K. 491 is another example. Manuscript evidence exists to suggest that embellishment did occur (e.g., an embellished version of the slow movement of No. 23, apparently by his gifted pupil Barbara Ployer).

In 1840, evidence was published from two brothers, Philipp Karl and Heinrich Anton Hoffmann, who had heard Mozart perform two concertos, Nos. 19 and 26 (K. 459 and K. 537) in Frankfurt am Main in 1790. Philip Karl reported that Mozart embellished his slow movements "tenderly and tastefully once one way, once another according to the momentary inspiration of his genius", and he later (1803) published embellished Mozart slow movements to six of his later concertos (K. 467, 482, 488, 491, 503, and 595).

Mozart himself wrote to his sister in 1784 agreeing with her that something was missing in the slow movement of K. 451, and an embellished part of the passage in question is preserved in St. Peters Archabbey, Salzburg (see location of autographs below); presumably the part he sent her. Mozart also wrote embellished versions of several of his piano sonatas, including the Dürnitz Sonata, K. 284/205b; the slow movement of K. 332/300k; and the slow movement of K. 457. In all of these works, the embellishments appear in the first editions published under Mozart's guidance, with the suggestion that they represent examples of embellishments for lesser pianists than himself to follow.

However, to many admirers of the concertos, it is exactly these sparse points that are so beautiful, and the establishment of the autographs as the texts for the concertos has made many pianists reluctant to depart from them. Nevertheless, the existence of these Mozartian additions and of several other embellished versions published early in the 19th century suggests that the expectation would be that especially slow movements would be embellished according to the taste or skill of the performer, and thus that the versions most commonly-heard today would not reflect how the original listeners in general experienced these works.

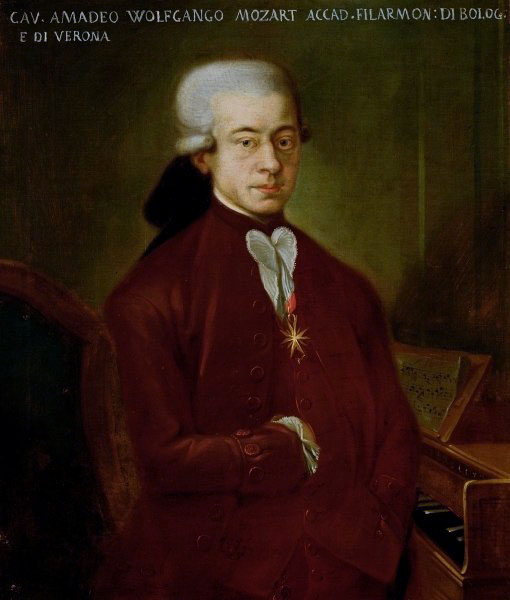
Portrait of Mozart. The painting is a 1777 copy of a work now lost.

== Assessment and reception ==
=== 19th century ===
Among all concertos, only two, No. 20 in D minor, K. 466, and No. 24 in C minor, K. 491, are in minor keys. The concertos in major keys were undervalued in the 19th century. Clara Schumann's concert repertoire contained only the D minor, the C minor, and No. 10 for two pianos in E♭ major, K. 365, which she first performed in concert in 1857, 1863, and 1883 respectively. Peter Gutmann calls the D-minor concerto "the most historically popular and influential" of all the concertos. He writes that "overtly dark, dramatic and impassioned", it was an antecedent of Beethoven and "appealed directly to the romanticized taste of the 19th century." Beethoven (WoO 58), Brahms (WoO 16), and Clara Schumann wrote cadenzas for it.

=== Fuller, post-1900 assessment ===
The D-minor concerto has remained highly appreciated, but it now shares honors with many other of the concertos. Mozart's development of the piano concerto created a complex form that was arguably never surpassed. Of the later composers (especially after Beethoven, who noted Mozartian procedure), only Brahms paid attention to his classicism as expressed in the formal structure of these works.

Their value as music and popularity does not rest upon their formal structure though but on the musical content. Mozart's piano concertos are filled with assured transition passages, modulations, dissonances, Neapolitan relationships and suspensions. This technical skill, combined with a complete command of his (admittedly rather limited) orchestral resources, in particular of the woodwinds in the later concertos, allowed him to create a variety of moods at will, from the comic operatic nature of the end of K. 453, through to the dream-like state of the famous "Elvira Madigan" Andante from K. 467, through to the majestic expansiveness of his Piano Concerto No. 25, K. 503. In particular, these major works of Mozart could hardly fail to be influenced by his own first love, i. e., opera, and the Mozart of Figaro, Don Giovanni and Die Zauberflöte is found throughout them. Mozart clearly valued the concertos, some of which he guarded carefully. For example, No. 23 was not published in his lifetime, and the score was kept within his family and close circle of friends, whom he asked not to give it away.

The qualities of the piano concertos have become more fully appreciated in the last 50 years or so. The list of notable names that have contributed cadenzas to the concertos (e.g., Beethoven, Hummel, Landowska, Britten, Brahms, Schnittke, etc.) attests to this fact. Beethoven was clearly impressed by them: even if the anecdotal story about his comments to Ferdinand Ries about No. 24 is legendary, his third concerto was clearly inspired by Mozart's No. 24, and his entire concerto production took its point of departure as the Mozartian concept.

Despite their renown, the Mozart piano concertos are not without some detractors. Even amongst his mature examples, there are examples of movements that can be argued to fall short of his normally high standards. This is particularly true for some of the last movements, which can appear too light to balance the first two movements – an example being the last movement of No. 16. Girdlestone considered that even popular movements such as the last movement to No. 23 did not really satisfactorily solve the inherent structural problems of rondo last movements, and he suggests that it was not until the last movement of the Jupiter Symphony that Mozart produced a truly great last movement. Similarly, a few of the slow movements have sometimes been considered repetitive (e.g., Hutchings' view of the Romanzas in general, and that to No. 20 in D minor in particular – an assessment later disputed by Grayson).

Today, at least three of these works (Nos. 20, 21 and 23) are among the most recorded and popular classical works in the repertoire, and with the release of several complete recordings of the concertos in recent years, notably by Philips and Naxos, some of the less-well known concertos may also increase in popularity.

The first four concertos are only orchestrations of works by other composers; Gutmann calls these "juvenilia." Gutmann also calls "simplistic" the Concerto for three (or two) pianos and orchestra. With these exceptions, Gutmann writes of Mozart that "all of his mature concertos have been acclaimed as masterpieces". For example, he says Mozart liked his first original concerto, his fifth (K. 175), written at age 17, and performed it through the rest of his life.

== Discography ==
The discography for Mozart's piano concertos is massive. In recent years, a number of (more or less) complete sets of the concertos have been released; these include:

- DGG: Camerata Salzburg, conducted and played by Géza Anda. Full set without Nos. 7 and 10 and the three arrangements of sonatas by J.C. Bach (K. 107/1, 2 and 3).
- Naxos: Concentus Hungaricus, conducted by András Ligeti, Matyas Antal and Ildiko Hegyi, played by Jenő Jandó. Nos. 7 and 10 have Dénes Várjon as the other pianist (No. 7 in the arrangement for two pianos). Lacks K. 107.
- Sony: The Vienna Festival Orchestra, conducted by Stephen Simon, played by Lili Kraus. Lacks the double/triple concertos and K. 107.
- Sony: English Chamber Orchestra, conducted and played by Murray Perahia. Nos. 7 and 10 have Radu Lupu as the other pianist (No. 7 in the arrangement for two pianos). Lacks K. 107.
- Sony: Bamberg Symphony, conducted by Frank Beermann, played by Matthias Kirschnereit. Lacks the early harpsichord concertos and the double/triple concertos.
- EMI Classics: English Chamber Orchestra, conducted and played by Daniel Barenboim. Lacks the double/triple concertos and K. 107.
- Warner Classics: Berliner Philarmoniker, conducted and played by Daniel Barenboim. Lacks the early harpsichord concertos and the double/triple concertos.
- Warner Classics: Mozarteum Orchestra Salzburg, conducted by Leopold Hager, played by Karl Engel, with Till Engel (Nos. 7 and 10) and Leopold Hager (No. 7) for the double/triple concertos. Lacks K. 107.
- Hänssler Classic: Wiener Symphoniker, conducted and played by Rudolf Buchbinder. Lacks the early harpsichord concertos and the double/triple concertos.
- Decca: Camerata Salzburg, conducted by Sándor Végh and played by András Schiff. Lacks the early harpsichord concertos and the double/triple concertos.
- Decca: Philharmonia Orchestra, conducted and played by Vladimir Ashkenazy, with Daniel Barenboim (Nos. 7 and 10), Fou Ts'ong (No. 7) and English Chamber Orchestra for the double/triple concertos. Lacks K. 107.
- Brilliant Classics: Philharmonia Orchestra, conducted by Paul Freeman, played by Derek Han. For the double/triple concertos Zoltán Kocsis (Nos. 7 and 10), Dezső Ránki (Nos. 7 and 10), András Schiff (No. 7) and Hungarian State Symphony Orchestra, conducted by János Ferencsik. There also the original J.C. Bach's three sonatas that inspired Piano Concertos K. 107.
- Philips: London Symphony Orchestra, conducted by Colin Davis (Nos. 11, 13-16, 18, 22, 24), Witold Rowicki (Nos. 6, 9, 12, 17, 19, 21, 23, 26), Alceo Galliera (Nos. 5, 7, 8, 10, 20, 25, 27), played by Ingrid Haebler, with Ludwig Hoffmann (Nos. 7 and 10) and Sas Bunge (No. 7) for the double/triple concertos. Lacks K. 107. Concertos 1–4: Vienna Capella Academica, conducted by Eduard Melkus and played on fortepiano.
- Philips (The Complete Mozart Edition): Academy of St. Martin in the Fields, conducted by Neville Marriner and played by Alfred Brendel. Imogen Cooper is the other pianist in Nos. 7 and 10 (No. 7 in the arrangement for two pianos). No. 7 also for three pianos: Berliner Philarmoniker, conducted by Semyon Bychkov, also pianist with Katia and Marielle Labèque. Concertos 1–4: Vienna Capella Academica, conducted by Eduard Melkus and played on fortepiano by Ingrid Haebler. Concertos K. 107: Amsterdam Baroque Orchestra, conducted and played by Ton Koopman.
- Philips: English Chamber Orchestra, conducted by Jeffrey Tate, played by Mitsuko Uchida. Lacks the early harpsichord concertos and the double/triple concertos.
- MD&G: Lausanne Chamber Orchestra, conducted and played by Christian Zacharias. Lacks the early harpsichord concertos and the double/triple concertos.

Notable (more or less) complete fortepiano recordings include:

- Archiv: English Baroque Soloists, conducted by John Eliot Gardiner, played by Malcolm Bilson, with Robert Levin (Nos. 7 and 10) and Melvyn Tan (No. 7) for the double/triple concertos. The early harpsichord concertos available under the brand of MusicMasters Classics with Thomas Crawford as conductor and Orchestra of the Old Fairfield Academy.
- Channel Classics: Anima Eterna, conducted and played by Jos van Immerseel. Lacks the early harpsichord concertos and the double/triple concertos.
- L'Oiseau-Lyre/AAM Records: Academy of Ancient Music, conducted by Christopher Hogwood (Nos. 1–5, 9, 11–20, 22, 23 and 26, L'Oiseau-Lyre), Richard Egarr (Nos. 21, 24, 25, 27), Bojan Čičič (Nos. 6, 8 and K. 107) and Laurence Cummings (Nos. 7 and 10), played by Robert Levin, with Ya-Fei Chuang and Laurence Cummings for the double/triple concertos. Early concertos played on harpsichord.
- EtCetera: Musicae Antiquae Collegium Varsoviense, conducted by Tadeusz Karolak, played by Viviana Sofronitsky, with Linda Nicholson (Nos. 7 and 10) and Mario Aschauer (No. 7) for the double/triple concertos. Early concertos played on harpsichord.
- BIS: Kölner Akademie, conducted by Michael Alexander Willens, played by Ronald Brautigam, with Alexei Lubimov (Nos. 7 and 10) and Manfred Huss (No. 7) and Haydn Sinfonietta Wien, conducted by Manfred Huss, for the double/triple concertos.

== Use in films ==
Mozart's piano concertos have been featured in the soundtracks to several films, with the slow movement of No. 23 (KV. 488) and the slow movement of No. 21 (KV. 467) being the most popular. The extensive use of the latter in the 1967 film Elvira Madigan about a doomed love story between a Danish tightrope walker and a Swedish officer has led to the concerto often being referred to as "Elvira Madigan" even today, when the film itself is largely forgotten. A partial list of films that feature Mozart's concertos includes:

- Funeral in Berlin (1966) – No. 23
- Incompreso (1966) – No. 23
- Elvira Madigan (1967), the Bo Widerberg version – No. 21
- The Spy Who Loved Me (1977) – No. 21
- They All Laughed (1981) – No. 27
- Amadeus (1984) the fictionalised Mozart biopic – Nos. 10, 15, 20, and 22
- Barfly (1987) – No. 25
- Pacific Heights (1990) – No. 19
- Regarding Henry (1991) – No. 21
- Boxing Helena (1993) – No. 25
- Silent Fall (1994) – No. 21
- The Associate (1996) – No. 25
- The Way of the Gun (2000) – No. 23
- Le Goût des autres (2000) – No. 21
- Vidocq (2001) – No. 23
- Spun (2002) – No. 23
- The New World (2005) – No. 23
- Superman Returns (2006) – No. 21
- The Lady (2011) – No. 23
- The Death of Stalin (2017) – No. 23
- No Other Choice (2025) – No. 23

== Location of autographs of the concertos ==
The autographs of the concertos owned by Mozart's widow were purchased by Johann Anton André in 1799, and most of these passed into the collections of the Prussian State Library in Berlin in 1873. Other autographs owned by Otto Jahn had been acquired in 1869. A few parts of André's collection remained for a long time in private hands; hence, in 1948, when Hutchings compiled the whereabouts of the autographs, two (Nos. 6 and 21) were in the hands of the Wittgenstein family in Vienna, whilst No. 5 was owned by F. A. Grassnick in Berlin and No. 26 by D. N. Heinemann in Brussels; a few others were scattered around other museums.

In the last 50 years, however, all of the extant autographs have made their way into libraries. The entire Prussian State collection of autographs was evacuated during World War II to the eastern front, where they disappeared and were feared lost until the 1970s. At this point, they resurfaced in Poland and are now held in the Biblioteka Jagiellońska (Jagiellonian Library) in Kraków. In addition, various copies used by Mozart and his family have come to light.

Opening page of the autograph manuscript of Mozart's Piano Concerto No. 26, K. 537, in Mozart's handwriting

The list of locations of the autographs given by Cliff Eisen in 1997 is:

- K: 37, 39–41: Staatsbibliothek zu Berlin.
- K. 175: Autograph lost; Mozart family copy: Archabbey of St Peter's, Salzburg.
- K. 238: Library of Congress, Washington, D.C. Mozart family copy in St Peter's, Salzburg.
- K. 242: Biblioteka Jagiellońska, Kraków. Other copies: Staatsbibliothek zu Berlin; Stanford University Library.
- K. 246: Biblioteka Jagiellońska, Kraków. Mozart family copy, St Peter's, Salzburg.
- K. 271: Biblioteka Jagiellońska, Kraków. Mozart family copy, St Peter's, Salzburg.
- K. 365: Biblioteka Jagiellońska, Kraków. Mozart family copy, St Peter's, Salzburg; performance copy in Státní Zámek a Zahrady (State Gardens and Castle), Kroměříž, Czech Republic.
- K. 413: Biblioteka Jagiellońska, Kraków. Mozart copy (incomplete), St Peter's, Salzburg.
- K. 414: Biblioteka Jagiellońska, Kraków. Mozart copy (incomplete), St Peter's, Salzburg.
- K. 415: Biblioteka Jagiellońska, Kraków. Mozart copy, St Peter's, Salzburg.
- K. 449: Biblioteka Jagiellońska, Kraków. Mozart family copy, St Peter's, Salzburg.
- K. 450: Thüringische Landesbibliothek, Weimar, Germany.
- K. 451: Biblioteka Jagiellońska, Kraków. Mozart family copy, St Peter's, Salzburg.
- K. 453: Biblioteka Jagiellońska, Kraków.
- K. 456: Staatsbibliothek zu Berlin.
- K. 459: Staatsbibliothek zu Berlin.
- K. 466: Bibliothek und Archiv, Gesellschaft der Musikfreunde, Vienna. Mozart family copy, St Peter's, Salzburg.
- K. 467: Pierpont Morgan Library, New York.
- K. 482: Staatsbibliothek zu Berlin.
- K. 488: Bibliothèque Nationale, Paris.
- K. 491: Royal College of Music, London.
- K. 503: Staatsbibliothek zu Berlin.
- K. 537: Library of Congress, Washington, D.C. A facsimile has been published by Dover Publications.
- K. 595: Biblioteka Jagiellońska, Kraków.

== Concertos where Mozart's own cadenzas (and Eingänge) are extant ==
- K. 175: Two versions for each of the first two movements.
- K. 246: Two for first movement, three for the second.
- K. 271: Two for each movement.
- K. 365: First and third movements.
- K. 413: First and second movements.
- K. 414: All movements, two for second.
- K. 415: All movements.
- K. 449: First movement.
- K. 450: First and third movements.
- K. 451: First and third movements.
- K. 453: Two for first and second movements.
- K. 456: Two for first movement, one for third.
- K. 459: First and third movements.
- K. 488: First movement (unusually, written into the autograph).
- K. 595: First and third movements.
- K. 624/626a: 36 Cadenzas

Cadenzas to at least K. 466 and 467 may have existed.

== Notes ==
=== Sources ===
- Grayson, David (1998). Mozart Piano Concertos Nos 20 and 21. Cambridge Music Handbooks. Cambridge University Press. ISBN 0-521-48475-8.
- Hutchings, Arthur (1997). A Companion to Mozart's Piano Concertos. Oxford University Press. ISBN 0-19-816708-3.
- Mozart, W. A. Piano Concertos Nos. 1–6 in full score. Dover Publications, New York.ISBN 0-486-44191-1
- Mozart, W. A. Piano Concertos Nos. 7–10 in full score. Dover Publications, New York. ISBN 0-486-41165-6
- Mozart, W. A. Piano Concertos Nos. 11–16 in full score. Dover Publications, New York. ISBN 0-486-25468-2
- Mozart, W. A. Piano Concertos Nos. 17–22 in full score. Dover Publications, New York. ISBN 0-486-23599-8
- Mozart, W. A. Piano Concertos Nos. 23–27 in full score. Dover Publications, New York. ISBN 0-486-23600-5
- Mozart, W. A. Piano Concerto No. 26 in D major ("Coronation"), K. 537 – The Autograph Score. (New York: Pierpont Morgan Library in association with Dover Publications, 1991). ISBN 0-486-26747-4.
- Rosen, C. 1997. The Classical Style, expanded edition. Norton, New York. ISBN 0-393-04020-8
- Tischler, H. 1988. A Structural Analysis of Mozart's Piano Concertos. Institute of Medieval Music, New York. ISBN 0-912024-80-1
