= Piano Concerto in D major =

Piano Concerto in D major may refer to:

- Piano Concerto No. 5 (Mozart)
- Piano Concerto No. 16 (Mozart)
- Piano Concerto No. 26 (Mozart)
- Piano Concerto in D major, Op. 61a (Beethoven), arranged from Violin Concerto, Op. 61
- Piano Concerto No. 6 (Beethoven), Hess 15
- Piano Concerto No. 5 (Ries)
- Piano Concerto No. 1 (Saint-Saëns)
- Piano Concerto for the Left Hand (Ravel)
- Piano Concerto No. 3 (Kabalevsky)
