= Piano Concerto in F =

Piano Concerto in F may refer to:

- Concerto in F (Gershwin) by George Gershwin
- Piano Concerto No. 11 (Mozart) by Wolfgang Amadeus Mozart
- Piano Concerto No. 19 (Mozart) by Wolfgang Amadeus Mozart
- Piano Concerto No. 5 (Saint-Saëns), the Egyptian, by Camille Saint-Saëns
- Piano Concerto No. 2 (Shostakovich) by Dmitri Shostakovich

== See also ==
- Piano Concerto in F major (disambiguation)
- Piano Concerto in F minor (disambiguation)
