= Piano Concerto in F major =

Piano Concerto in F major may refer to:

- Piano Concerto No. 11 (Mozart), K. 413
- Piano Concerto No. 19 (Mozart), K. 459
- Piano Concerto No. 5 (Saint-Saëns), Op. 103, the Egyptian
- Concerto in F (Gershwin)
- Piano Concerto No. 2 (Shostakovich), Op. 102
