= Ingrid Haebler =

Austrian pianist (1929–2023)

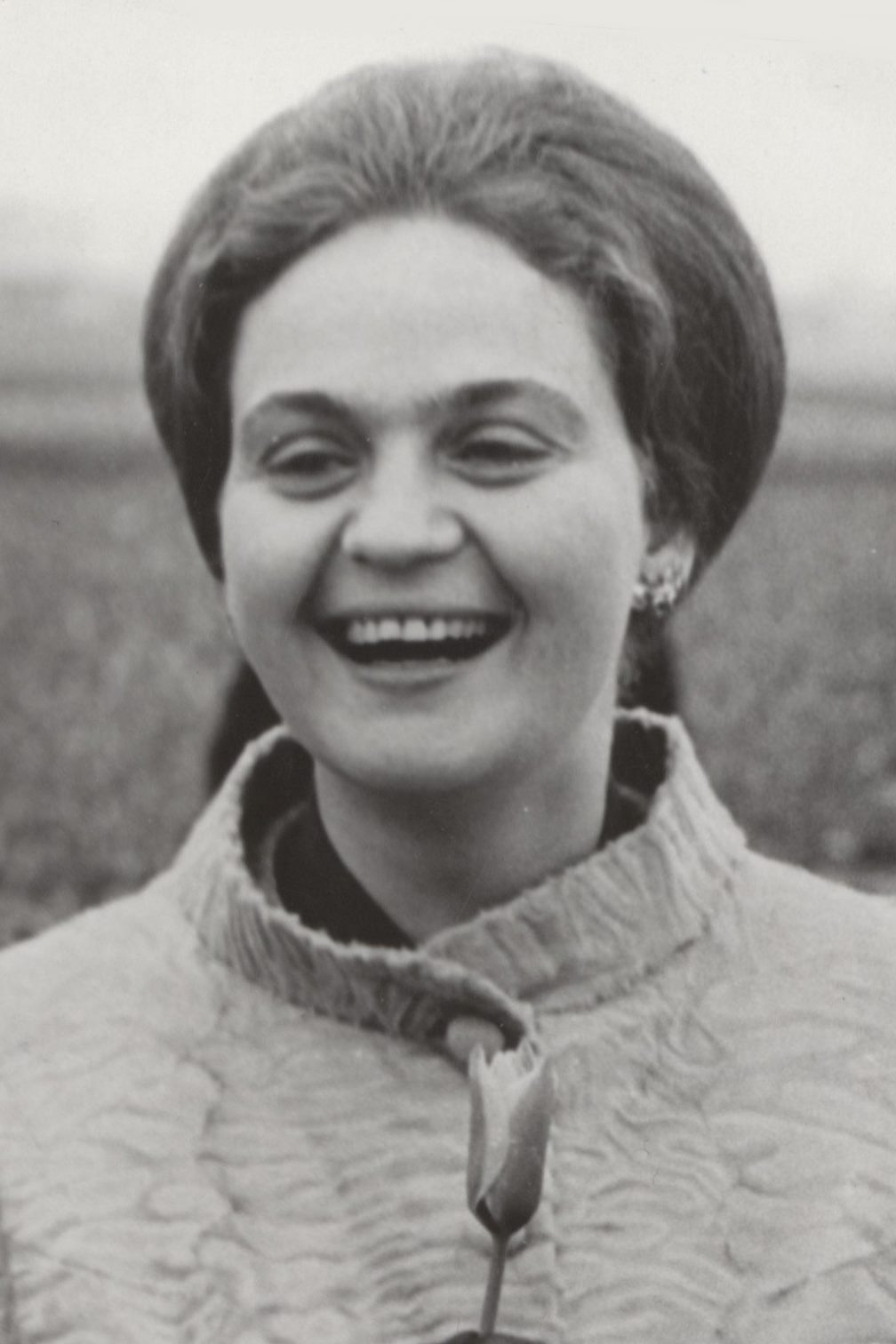
- Haebler in 1966
- Born: 20 June 1929; Vienna, Austria
- Died: 14 May 2023 (aged 93)
- Occupation: Pianist

Ingrid Haebler (20 June 1929– 14 May 2023) was an Austrian classical pianist.

== Early life ==
Haebler was born in Vienna in 1929. Her parents moved to Poland shortly after her birth, where she remained for her early childhood. Many celebrated musicians were regular visitors to the Haebler home, including Claudio Arrau, Robert Casadesus and Bronisław Huberman. It was Casadesus who recognised the child's talent as a pianist and predicted a great future for her.

On the outbreak of World War II the family moved to Salzburg where Haebler made her first public appearance at the age of eleven. She took up studies at the Mozarteum under Professor Heinz Scholz, graduating in 1949 with distinction for her playing of Mozart, and along the way developing a taste for music of the late eighteenth and early twentieth centuries. That same year Haebler won the Lilli Lehmann Medal of the International Mozarteum Foundation.

Haebler studied at the Salzburg Mozarteum, Vienna Music Academy, Conservatoire de Musique de Genève and privately in Paris with Marguerite Long.

== Career ==
Haebler toured worldwide and is best known for a series of recordings she made from the 1950s to the 1980s. Her complete set of Mozart's piano sonatas for the Denon label is still regarded as among the finest sets.

Haebler also recorded all of Mozart's piano concertos (most of them twice), often with her own cadenzas, and all of Schubert's sonatas. She was one of several Austrian musicians to experiment early with period instruments, having recorded the keyboard concertos of Johann Christian Bach on a fortepiano, with the Capella Academica Wien under Eduard Melkus, as well as Mozart's keyboard concertos nos. 1-4 with the same ensemble and director for Philips Records. Her recordings of Mozart and Beethoven with the violinist Henryk Szeryng are particularly prized.

Through the 1950s, Ingrid Haebler's repertoire ranged from Bach to Stravinsky and she toured extensively in Europe, North Africa, Australia, the United States, Canada, and Japan. She began annual appearances at the Salzburg Festival in 1954.

== Death ==
Haebler died on 14 May 2023.
