= Piano Concerto No. 14 (Mozart) =

1784 composition by W. A. Mozart

- by W. A. Mozart
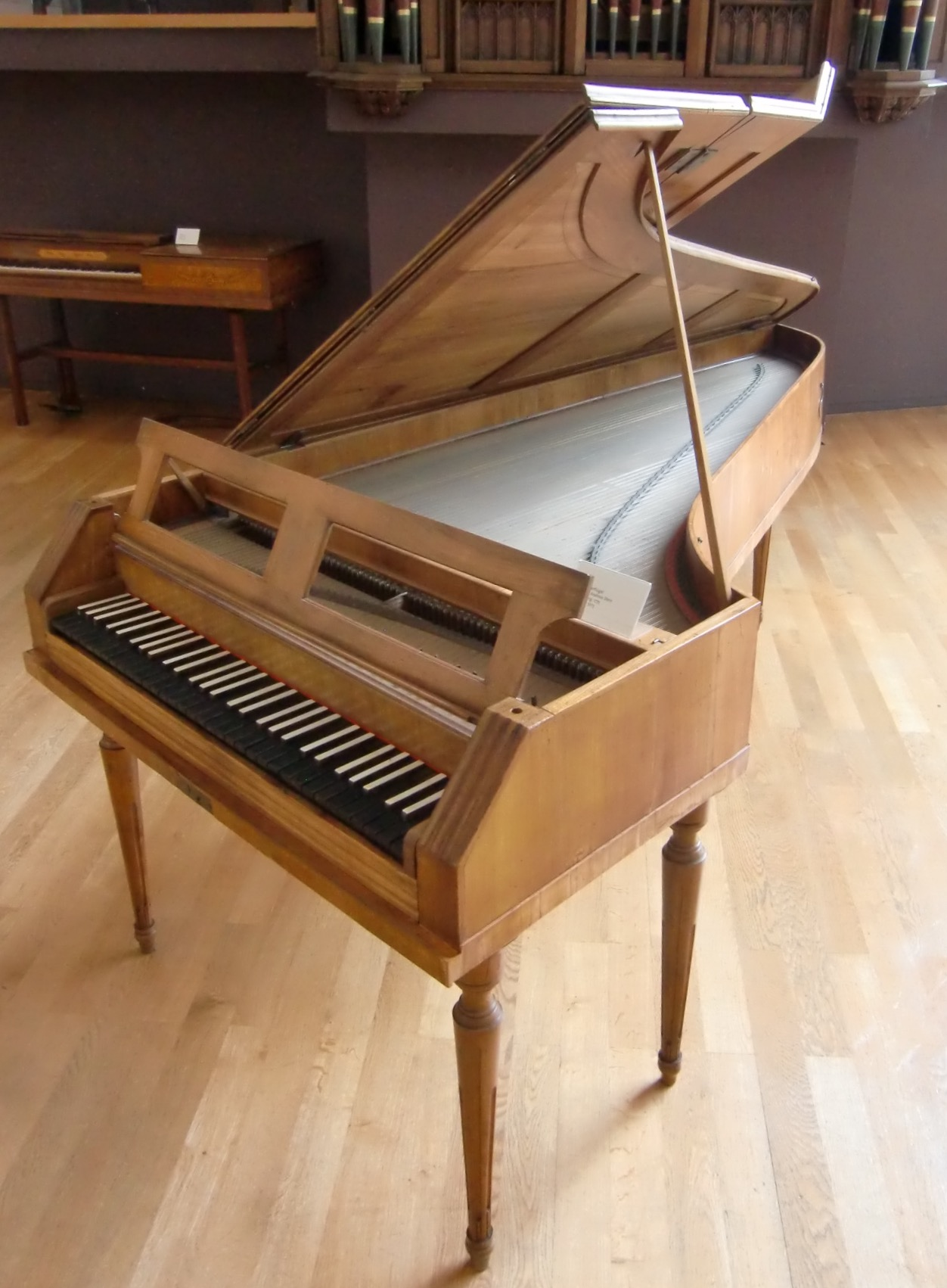
- Pianoforte by Johann Andreas Stein (1775)
- Key: E♭ major
- Catalogue: K. 449
- Composed: 1784
- Movements: 3
- Scoring: Piano; orchestra

Premiere
- Date: 17 March 1784
- Location: Trattnerhof, Vienna
- Performers: Wolfgang Amadeus Mozart

The Piano Concerto No. 14 in E♭ major, K. 449, is a composition for solo piano and orchestra by Wolfgang Amadeus Mozart, written in Vienna in 1784.

== History ==
The Piano Concerto in E-flat is the first work that Mozart entered into his personal catalog, a notebook of his music which he kept for the rest of his life, indicating the main themes and dates of completion of each work. From this primary source, it is known that he finished the concerto on 9 February 1784. Mozart had begun the concerto while writing the three previous ones for his subscription concerts of 1782–1783. However, he did not resume work on it until 1784, when he completed it alongside the 15th and 16th concertos (K. 450 and 451). In a letter to his father, having mentioned the technical difficulty of these concertos, Mozart then adds "The one in E-flat does not belong at all to the same category. It is a concerto of an entirely special manner."

The concerto was composed for his pupil Barbara Ployer.

While critics such as Charles Rosen, Cuthbert Girdlestone and Arthur Hutchings have hailed K. 450 and K. 451 as heralding a new epoch in Mozart's concerto writing, opinions on K. 449 are more qualified. Girdlestone regarded it as "something exceptional", describing the first movement as "born of an unstable, restless mood, sometimes petulant and irascible". Alfred Einstein noted its singular character, commenting that "Mozart never wrote another concerto like it, either before or afterwards."

Like his earlier concertos, Nos. 11, K. 413, 12, K. 414, and 13, K. 415, Mozart wrote the E-flat Piano Concerto for his subscription concerts, "either with a large orchestra with wind instruments or merely a quattro". Neal Zaslaw has pointed out that this most likely meant performance with a string section of four parts, rather than one instrument to each part.

== Structure ==
The concerto is scored for 2 oboes, 2 horns and strings, and it is in three movements:

1. Allegro vivace (3/4)
2. Andantino (B♭ major, 2/4)
3. Allegro ma non troppo (2/2 – 6/8)

=== I. Allegro vivace ===
The first movement begins in a 3/4 time signature, an unusual feature among Mozart's 23 original piano concertos. Among them, only this concerto, and Nos. 11 and 24 open with a movement in this time signature.

The first phrase of this concerto begins ambiguously. A unison E♭ followed by a C, then a G, is followed by the dominant chord's leading tone (A♮) trilled up to the dominant, B♭. This progression seems to suggest a dominant cadence in the dominant key of B♭. In other words, C minor to F to B♭ (ii – V – I in B♭). There is an immediate modulation, through a fiery C-minor passage, into B♭ major. Here a possible second theme is heard, played by strings, winds not coming in until its later strain (near the modulation back into E♭).

=== II. Andantino ===
The second movement, in B♭ major, combines a three-part variation and sonata rondo form. Its second theme is in F major, and the middle part modulates briefly to B minor.

=== III. Allegro ma non troppo ===
Cuthbert Girdlestone writes that the gait of this finale is "neither that of a gallop, nor of a race, nor even of a dance, but just of a swinging walk, swift and regular, and the virtue of its refrain, with its sketchy outline and its 'sillabato' diction... rests in its rhythm rather than in its melody." Further, he notes that while this rondo can be divided into contrasting sections, the appearance on the page is very different from what falls on the ear, which is almost monothematic: "When, score in hand, one notes each return of the first subject... it is possible to pick out the four expositions of the [rondo] refrain and the three couplets... but on hearing it one's impression is that the refrain never leaves the stage."
