= Piano Concertos Nos. 1–4 (Mozart) =

Compositions by Wolfgang Amadeus Mozart

- Arrangements of sonatas by other composers by W. A. Mozart
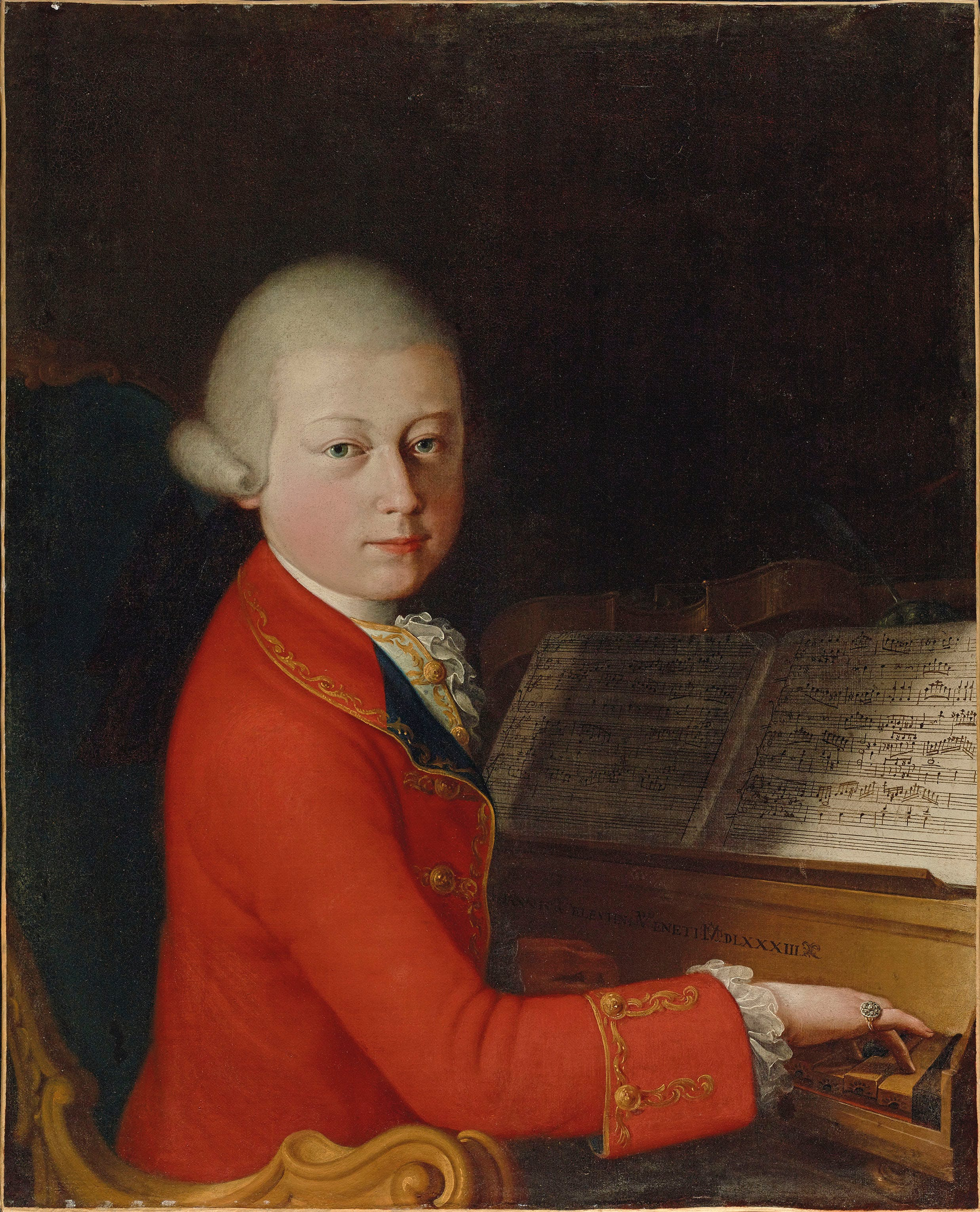
- The young composer in 1770
- Key: F major; B♭ major; D major; G major
- Catalogue: K. 37, 39–41
- Genre: Concerto
- Style: Classical period
- Composed: 1767
- Scoring: Piano; orchestra

Wolfgang Amadeus Mozart began his series of preserved piano concertos with four that he wrote in Salzburg at the age of eleven : K. 37 and 39–41. The autographs, all held by the Jagiellonian Library, Kraków, are dated by his father as having been completed in April (K. 37) and July (K. 39–41) of 1767. Although these works were long considered to be original, they are now known to be pasticcios of sonatas by various German composers. The works on which the concertos are based were largely published in Paris, and presumably Mozart and his family became acquainted with them or their composers during their visit to Paris in 1763–64.

By using movements from the sonatas of other composers, the young Mozart seems to have begun to learn how to cope with the structural problems of composing in the piano concerto form. It may be that Leopold Mozart had devised this as a compositional teaching method. If so, it seems that this may have been the first time this had been done by the composer. This is perhaps supported by two facts: First, Leopold excluded the first four concertos from his 1768 list, suggesting that he may not have considered them true compositions by his son. Second, the autographs of the four works are the joint products of both Wolfgang Amadeus and Leopold (although K. 41 is mainly in Leopold's hand alone).

== No. 1 (K. 37) in F major ==
Mozart's Piano Concerto No. 1
I. Allegro

II. Andante

III. Allegro

The concerto is scored for two oboes (silent in the second movement), two horns in F, piano (or harpsichord) and strings. The three movements are:

1. Allegro (4/4)
2. Andante (C major, 3/4)
3. Allegro (3/4)

The first movement is based on the initial allegro of the sonata for keyboard with violin accompaniment (Op. 1, No. 5) by Hermann Friedrich Raupach, from a set of six published in Paris in 1756. The provenance of the second movement is unknown, although Eric Blom, the editor of the 5th edition of Grove's Dictionary (1954), suggested that it was in fact by Mozart. The final movement is based on the first movement of the sonata, Op. 2, No. 3, by the Strasbourg-based Leontzi Honauer.

== No. 2 (K. 39) in B♭ major ==
Mozart's Piano Concerto No. 2
I. Allegro spiritoso

II. Andante

III. Molto allegro

The concerto is scored for pairs of oboes and horns (in B-flat), piano (or harpsichord), and strings. The movements are:

1. Allegro spiritoso (4/4)
2. Andante staccato (F major, 4/4)
3. Molto allegro (2/4)

The first and third of the movements are again from Raupach (Op. 1, No. 1), whilst the slow movement is based on the opening movement of Johann Schobert's Op. 17, No. 2, a composer admired by Mozart.

== No. 3 (K. 40) in D major ==
The concerto is scored for pairs of oboes, horns and trumpets (both in D), piano (or harpsichord), and strings. The movements are:

1. Allegro maestoso (4/4)
2. Andante (A major, 2/4, trumpets silent)
3. Presto (3/8)

The first movement is based on the initial movement of Honauer's Op. 2, No. 1. The second on one by Johann Gottfried Eckard (Op. 1, No. 4), the most famous keyboardist of his day. The third movement is based on C. P. E. Bach's piece La Boehmer, published in the early 1760s. Mozart's cadenzas for the concerto survive.

== No. 4 (K. 41) in G major ==
The concerto is scored for pairs of flutes and horns in G, piano (or harpsichord) and strings. The movements are:

1. Allegro (3/4)
2. Andante (G minor, 2/4)
3. Molto allegro (3/4)

As all the movements of this concerto are in either G major or G minor, the work is homotonal. In only four other piano concerti by Mozart are the slow movement in a minor key (K. 271, K. 456, K. 482, and K. 488).

This concerto also opens in triple meter, an unusual feature of Mozart's 27 piano concertos; only K. 41, K. 413, K. 491, and K. 449 open in triple meter.

The first and third movements are based on ones by Honauer (Op. 1, No. 1), and the middle one on Raupach (Op. 1, No. 1).

== Assessment ==
By comparison to Mozart's later concertos or to those of J. C. Bach, these are slight works. The preludes that Mozart added to the sonatas do not contain a wealth of themes, as is typical for his later efforts, nor does the exposition or middle section add new thematic material. The role of the keyboard as soloist or continuo is not always clearly delineated. Nevertheless, some traces of his later structures can be detected: for example, the relative sizes of the sections is approximately similar, albeit on a smaller scale.
