= Piano Concerto No. 15 (Mozart) =

Composition by Wolfgang Amadeus Mozart

- by W. A. Mozart
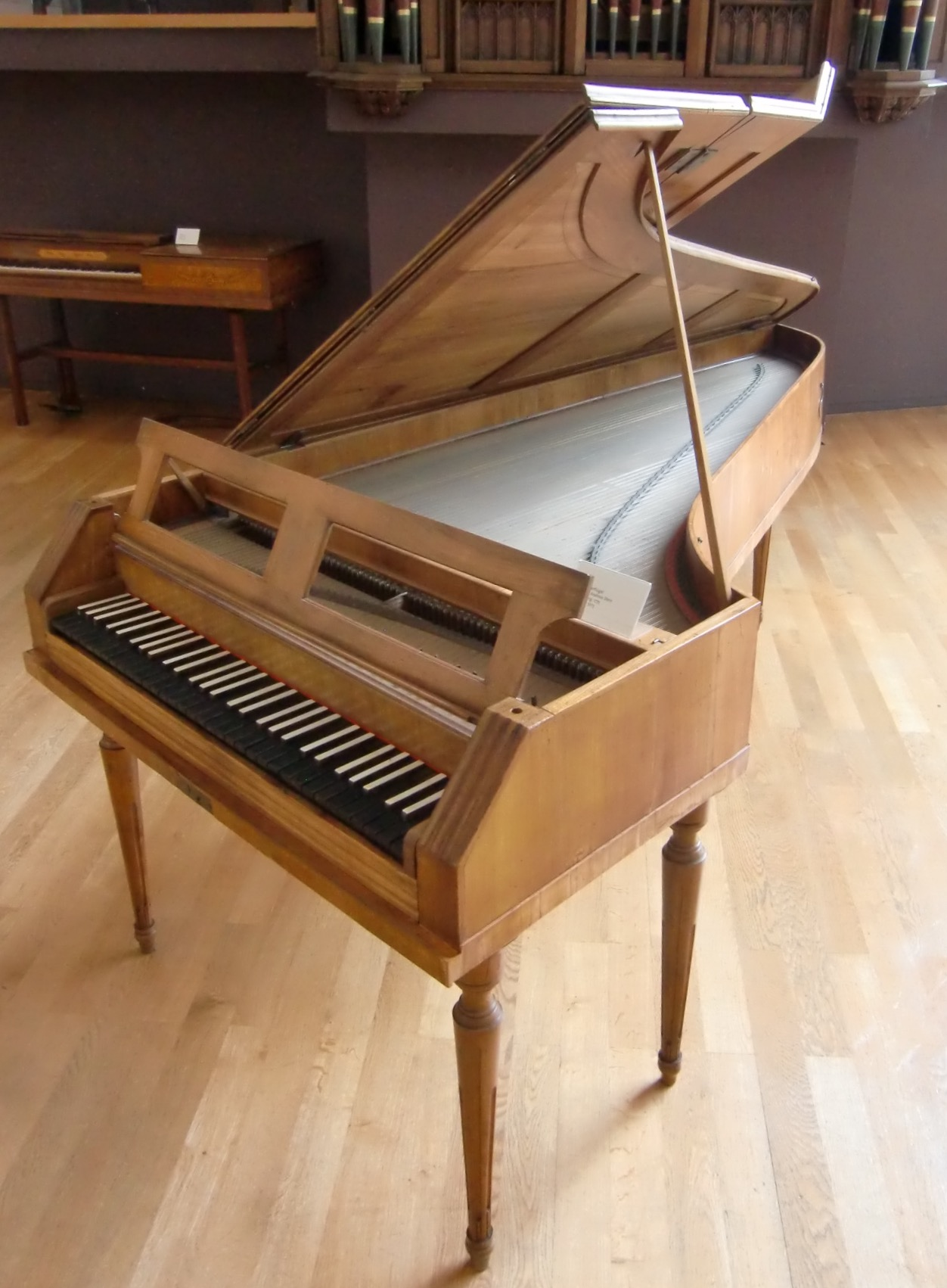
- Pianoforte by Johann Andreas Stein (Augsburg, 1775) – Berlin, Musikinstrumenten-Museum
- Key: B♭ major
- Catalogue: K. 450
- Composed: 1784
- Movements: Three
- Scoring: Piano; orchestra

I. Allegro

II. Andante

III. Allegro

The Piano Concerto No. 15 in B♭ major, K. 450 is a piano concerto by Wolfgang Amadeus Mozart. The concerto is scored for solo piano, flute (third movement only), two oboes, two bassoons, two French horns, and strings.

== History ==
Mozart composed the concerto for performance at a series of concerts at the Vienna venues of the Trattnerhof and the Burgtheater in the first quarter of 1784, where he was himself the soloist in March 1784.

In a letter to his father, Mozart compared this concerto with the 16th concerto in D: "I consider them both to be concertos which make one sweat; but the B flat one beats the one in D for difficulty."

Many pianists consider this to be one of the most difficult of Mozart's piano concertos. The concerto is primarily difficult from its many quick scale patterns which must be played perfectly and also from its many fast chord patterns moving up and down. Beginning with this concerto, Mozart began to use the term "grand" to describe his concerto such as K. 450 which feature a prominent and required wind section for the ensemble.

== Music ==
The concerto is in three movements:

1. Allegro
2. Andante in E♭ major
3. Allegro

The first movement is in typical sonata-allegro form. The middle movement consists of a theme and two variations. The finale is (as usual for Mozart) a sonata-rondo, although using a less-common ABACABA form. It is testimony to Mozart's greatness that although this movement is extremely difficult from a technical point of view, it never sounds like a 'showpiece' meant to display the performer's skills. Some of the demands made on the pianist include fast ascending-descending arpeggios, hand-crossing and voice highlighting in runs of semiquavers, wide jumps and towards the end a double-handed tremolo where the soloist 'battles against' the orchestra. This movement is among the most challenging works which Mozart has ever written for the keyboard.

Simon Keefe has noted contemporary comments from Mozart's era on how the woodwind writing in this concerto showed a "newly intricate and sophisticated" character compared to Mozart's prior keyboard concerti. Elaine Sisman has postulated that Mozart modeled the slow movement on a theme-and-variations movement from the Symphony No. 75 of Joseph Haydn.

== Sources ==
- Hutchings, Arthur, A Companion to Mozart's Piano Concertos, Oxford University Press (original publication, 1948).
- Steinberg, Michael, The Concerto: A Listener's Guide, Oxford (1998, ISBN 0-19-510330-0)
- Keefe, Simon P. (Summer 1999). "Dramatic Dialogue in Mozart's Viennese Piano Concertos: A Study of Competition and Cooperation in Three First Movements". The Musical Quarterly. 83 (2): 169–204. doi:10.1093/mq/83.2.169.
