= Barbara Ployer =

- Born: September 2, 1765; Sarmingsten, Austria
- Died: 1811; Brusane, Croatia
- Genres: Classical

Maria Anna Barbara or Babette Ployer (2 September 1765 – before April 1811) was an Austrian piano and composition pupil of Wolfgang Amadeus Mozart, for whom he wrote two piano concertos in 1784, No. 14 KV. 449 and No. 17, KV. 453, which were both premiered at her residence by her in 1784.

She was born on 2 September 1765 in Sarmingstein, Austria, and died before April 1811, in Bresane, Croatia. She was the daughter of Franz Kajetan Ployer, a timber-merchant and tax collector. After her mother died in 1779 she moved to Vienna to live with her uncle, Court Councillor Gottfried Ignaz von Ployer, the agent of the Salzburg court in Vienna, where she came in contact with Mozart. After her marriage she moved to Kreuz in Croatia, where her spouse Cornelius Bujánovics von Agg-Telek (c.1770–1844) had his estate.

Both the concertos that Mozart wrote for her are of the highest quality, and the piano parts are testing, suggesting she was highly accomplished both technically and musically. Joseph Haydn's Variations in F minor for piano were not written for her, but for Gottfried Ignaz von Ployer's wife Antonia von Ployer, née von Spaun.

Mozart could take pains with a backward pupil, but a good one caused him much pride. On June 9, 1784, he wrote to his father: "I am fetching Paisiello in my carriage, as I want him to hear both my pupil and my compositions." This pupil was Barbara Ployer, of whom he made a portrait-sketch in the margin of one of his compositions, reproduced in the sheet music for Mozart's Sonata in D Major KV. 448 for Two Hands, published in 2014 by Alfred Music.
