= Piano Concerto No. 7 (Mozart) =

1776 composition by W. A. Mozart

Concerto No. 7 for three pianos
- Lodron
- by W. A. Mozart
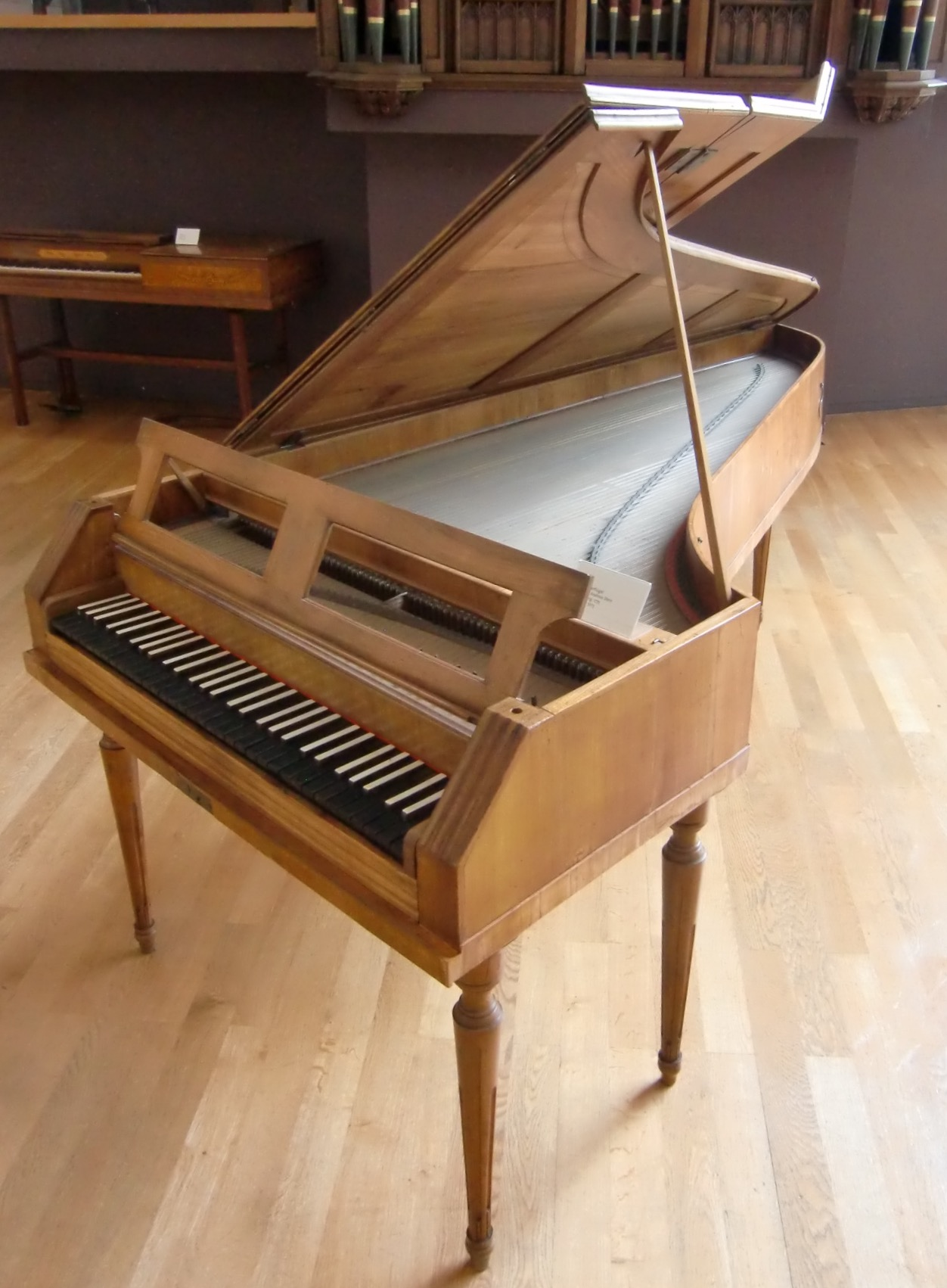
- Pianoforte once attributed to Johann Andreas Stein (Augsburg, 1775), Berlin Musical Instrument Museum
- Key: F major
- Catalogue: K. 242
- Composed: 1776, rev. 1780
- Movements: Three (Allegro, Adagio, Tempo di minuetto)
- Scoring: 3 pianos; orchestra

In 1776, Wolfgang Amadeus Mozart composed three piano concertos, one of which was the Concerto for three pianos and orchestra in F major, No. 7, K. 242. He originally finished it in February 1776 for three pianos; however, when he eventually recomposed it for himself and another pianist in 1780 in Salzburg, he rearranged it for two pianos, and that is how the piece is often performed today. The concerto is often nicknamed "Lodron" because it was commissioned by Countess Antonia Lodron to be played with her two daughters Aloysia and Giuseppa.

The concerto is scored for 2 oboes, 2 horns, 3 solo pianos and strings. It has three movements:

1. Allegro 4/4
2. Adagio in B♭ major 4/4
3. Rondo: Tempo di minuetto 3/4

Girdlestone, in his Mozart and His Piano Concertos, describes the concerto and compares one of the themes of its slow movement to similar themes that turn up in later concertos – especially No. 25, K. 503 – in more developed forms.

The first British performance was given by the New Queen's Hall Orchestra at The Proms, Queen's Hall on 12 September 1907. The soloists were Henry Wood, York Bowen and Frederick Kiddle, conducted by Henri Verbrugghen.
