= Piano Concerto in F minor =

Piano Concerto in F minor may refer to:

- Piano Concerto No. 2 (Chopin), Op. 21
- Piano Concerto No. 1 (Glazunov), Op. 92
- Piano Concerto (Reger), Op. 114
- Konzertstück in F minor (Weber), Op. 79, J. 282

== See also ==
- BWV 1056, Harpsichord Concerto No. 5 in F minor, by Johann Sebastian Bach
