= Piano Concerto No. 17 (Mozart) =

1784 concerto by W. A. Mozart

- by W. A. Mozart
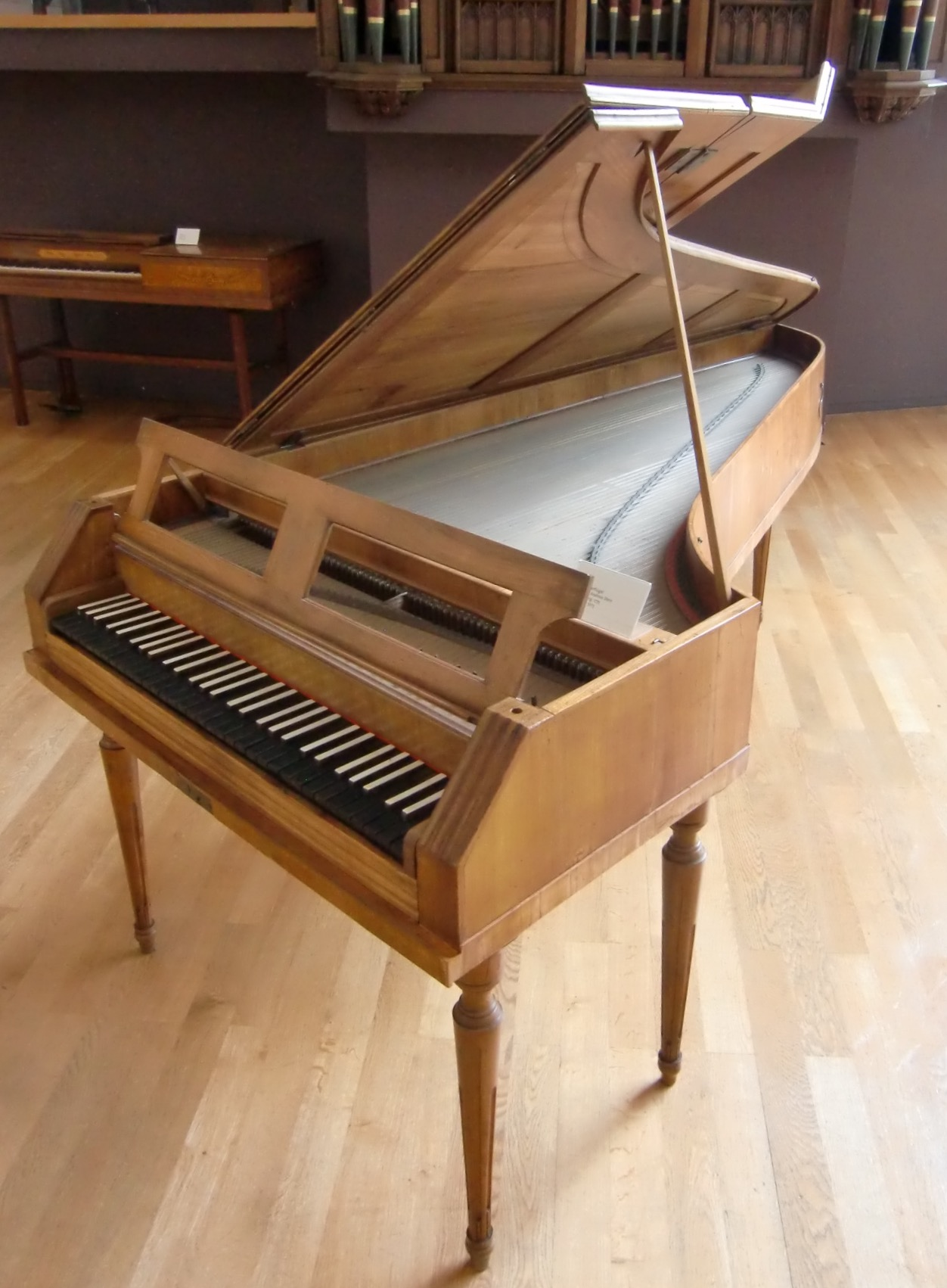
- Fortepiano by Johann Andreas Stein (Augsburg, 1775) – Berlin, Musikinstrumenten-Museum
- Key: G major
- Catalogue: K. 453
- Composed: 1784
- Dedication: Barbara Ployer
- Movements: Three (Allegro, Andante, Allegretto – Presto)
- Scoring: Piano; orchestra

Premiere
- Performers: Barbara Ployer
- I. Allegro II. Andante III. Allegretto – Presto

The Piano Concerto No. 17 in G major, K. 453, was written in 1784 by Wolfgang Amadeus Mozart.

The work is orchestrated for solo piano, flute, two oboes, two bassoons, two horns in G (and C for Andante), and strings. Like most of Mozart's concertos, it is in three movements:

1. Allegro, (includes a cadenza)
2. Andante, 3/4 in C major
3. Allegretto – Presto,

According to the date that the composer himself noted on the score, the concerto was completed on 12 April 1784.

The date of the premiere is uncertain. In one view, the work is said to have been premiered by Mozart's student Barbara Ployer on 13 June 1784 at a concert to which Mozart had invited Giovanni Paisiello to hear both her and his new compositions, including also his recently written Quintet in E flat for Piano and Winds. Afterwards, Ployer was joined by Mozart in a performance of the Sonata for Two Pianos, K. 448. Another possibility, advanced by Lorenz (2006, 314), is that Mozart did not wait over two months to premiere the work, but performed it in his concert with Regina Strinasacchi on 29 April 1784 at the Kärntnertortheater. As a general consensus for researchers, it can be said with relative certainty that the work premiered during the mid-to-late spring of 1784, following its completion.

The allegretto is a theme and variations movement which Mozart's starling sang some time after the concerto was completed. He wrote "That was wonderful!"
