= Piano Concerto No. 26 (Mozart) =

1788 composition by W. A. Mozart

- Coronation
- by W. A. Mozart
- The first page of the autograph manuscript
- Key: D major
- Catalogue: K. 537
- Genre: Concerto
- Style: Classical period
- Composed: 1788
- Movements: Three (Allegro, Larghetto, Allegretto)
- Scoring: Piano; orchestra

The Piano Concerto No. 26 in D major, K. 537, was written by Wolfgang Amadeus Mozart and completed on 24 February 1788. It is generally known as the Coronation Concerto.

The concerto is scored for solo piano, one flute, 2 oboes, 2 bassoons, 2 horns, 2 trumpets, timpani (in D, A), and strings.

The autograph manuscript of the concerto is preserved in the Morgan Library & Museum.

== Origin of the nickname "Coronation" ==
The traditional name associated with this work is not Mozart's own, nor was the work written on the occasion for which posterity has named it. Mozart remarked in a letter to his wife in April 1789 that he had just performed this concerto at court. (While this performance on 14 April has often been assumed to have been the work's premiere, H. C. Robbins Landon considers this "exceedingly unlikely".) But the nickname "Coronation" was derived from his playing of the work at the time of the coronation of Leopold II as Holy Roman Emperor in October 1790 in Frankfurt. At the same concert, Mozart also played the Piano Concerto No. 19, K. 459.

Alan Tyson in his introduction to Dover Publications' facsimile of the autograph score (which today is in the Morgan Library & Museum in New York) comments that "Although K. 459 has at times been called a 'Coronation' concerto, this title has nearly always been applied to K. 537".

== Movements ==
I. Allegro

II. Larghetto

III. Allegretto
Performed by Lili Kraus and the Amsterdam Philharmonic Society Orchestra, conducted by Gianfranco Rivoli

The concerto has the following three movements:

1. Allegro in D major,
2. (Larghetto) in A major,
3. (Allegretto) in D major, 2/4

The second and third movements have their tempos given above in parentheses because in the autograph these are not given in Mozart's own handwriting but were written in by someone else. (The Neue Mozart-Ausgabe [NMA V/15/8, ed. Wolfgang Rehm] places the note "Tempobezeichnung im Autograph von fremder Hand" ["Tempo indication in autograph by another hand"] on both movements, though the old Breitkopf & Härtel Complete Works edition does not have any indication that the tempos are not Mozart's own.)

== The unfinished keyboard part ==
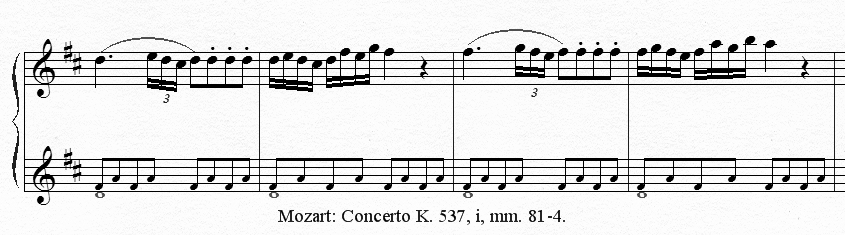
This illustration shows the beginning of the piano solo in the first movement of K. 537 (measures 81–4). The upper staff shows the notes written in Mozart's autograph score. The lower staff, presented here in smaller notes, is not given in the autograph but first appeared in the 1794 edition printed by Johann André.

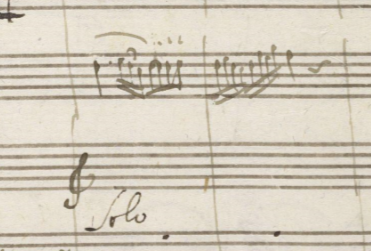
Measures 81–82 in the autograph manuscript, with no left-hand part.

There is a very unusual feature to this concerto. In addition to omitting the tempi for two of the movements, Mozart also, in Tyson's words, "did not write any notes for the piano's left hand in a great many measures throughout the work". As can be seen in the Dover Publications facsimile, large stretches of the solo part simply have nothing at all for the left hand, including the opening solo (mvmt. I, mm. 81–99) and the whole of the second movement. There is in fact no other Mozart piano concerto of which so much of the solo part was left unfinished by the composer.

The 1794 first edition had these gaps filled in, and most Mozart scholars such as Alfred Einstein and Alan Tyson have assumed that the additions were made by the publisher Johann André. Einstein is on record as finding André's completion somewhat wanting: "For the most part, this version is extremely simple and not too offensive, but at times—for example, in the accompaniment of the Larghetto theme—it is very clumsy, and the whole solo part would gain infinitely by revision and refinement in Mozart's own style."

Nearly all of the passages that necessitated filling in for the first edition lack only simple accompanimental patterns such as Alberti bass figures and chords. For example, measures 145–151 of the first movement, which involve more complicated virtuoso passagework, are fully written out in the autograph. For the less complex portions of the solo, it is clear that Mozart "knew perfectly well what he had to play" and so left them incomplete.

The old Breitkopf & Härtel Mozart Complete Works score of this concerto does not make any distinction between what Mozart himself wrote and what André (or someone commissioned by him) supplied. However, the Neue Mozart-Ausgabe volume referenced above prints André's supplements in smaller type, to clearly distinguish them from Mozart's own notes.

== Critical reception ==
While this concerto enjoyed a great popularity at the time due to its beauty and rococo (or galant) style, later judgments have been more divided. Some authorities have judged it to be of a lower quality than the twelve previous Viennese piano concertos or the final concerto in B♭. This amounts to a complete reversal of critical opinion, since K. 537 used to be one of Mozart's most celebrated keyboard concertos, especially during the 19th century. Still in 1935, Friedrich Blume, editor of the Eulenburg edition of this work, described it as "the best known and most frequently played" of Mozart's piano concertos. But writing in 1945, the musicologist Alfred Einstein commented:

...It is very Mozartean, while at the same time it does not express the whole or even the half of Mozart. It is, in fact, so 'Mozartesque' that one might say that in it Mozart imitated himself—no difficult task for him. It is both brilliant and amiable, especially in the slow movement; it is very simple, even primitive, in its relation between the solo and the tutti, and so completely easy to understand that even the nineteenth century always grasped it without difficulty....

Nonetheless, the "Coronation" concerto remains frequently performed today, and more recently prominent Mozart's interpreters, such as the pianist Mitsuko Uchida and the conductor Colin Davis, have described it as an underrated masterpiece.

== Sources ==
- Wolfgang Amadeus Mozart, Neue Mozart-Ausgabe, Serie V, Werkgruppe 15, Band 8, ed. Wolfgang Rehm. (Bärenreiter-Verlag, Kassel, 1960; BA 4524). Reprinted in Mozart: The Piano Concertos/Baerenreiter Urtext, ISMN M-006-20470-0, published in 2006. The "Coronation Concerto" can be found on pp. 3–92 (Vol. III, pp. 309–398 in the reprint edition).
- Wolfgang Amadeus Mozart, Piano Concertos Nos. 23–27 in Full Score (New York: Dover Publications, 1978). ISBN 0-486-23600-5. Reprint of the 19th century Breitkopf & Härtel Mozart Complete Works edition of these concertos; the "Coronation Concerto" is on pp. 187–242.
- Alfred Einstein, Mozart: His Character, His Work. Translated by Arthur Mendel and Nathan Broder. (London: Oxford University Press, 1945). ISBN 0-19-500732-8.
- Alan Tyson, "Introduction", in Mozart: Piano Concerto No. 26 in D major ("Coronation"), K. 537—The Autograph Score. (New York: Morgan Library & Museum in association with Dover Publications, 1991), pp. vii–xi. ISBN 0-486-26747-4.
