= Piano Concerto No. 5 (Mozart) =

1773 piano concerto by W. A. Mozart

- by W. A. Mozart
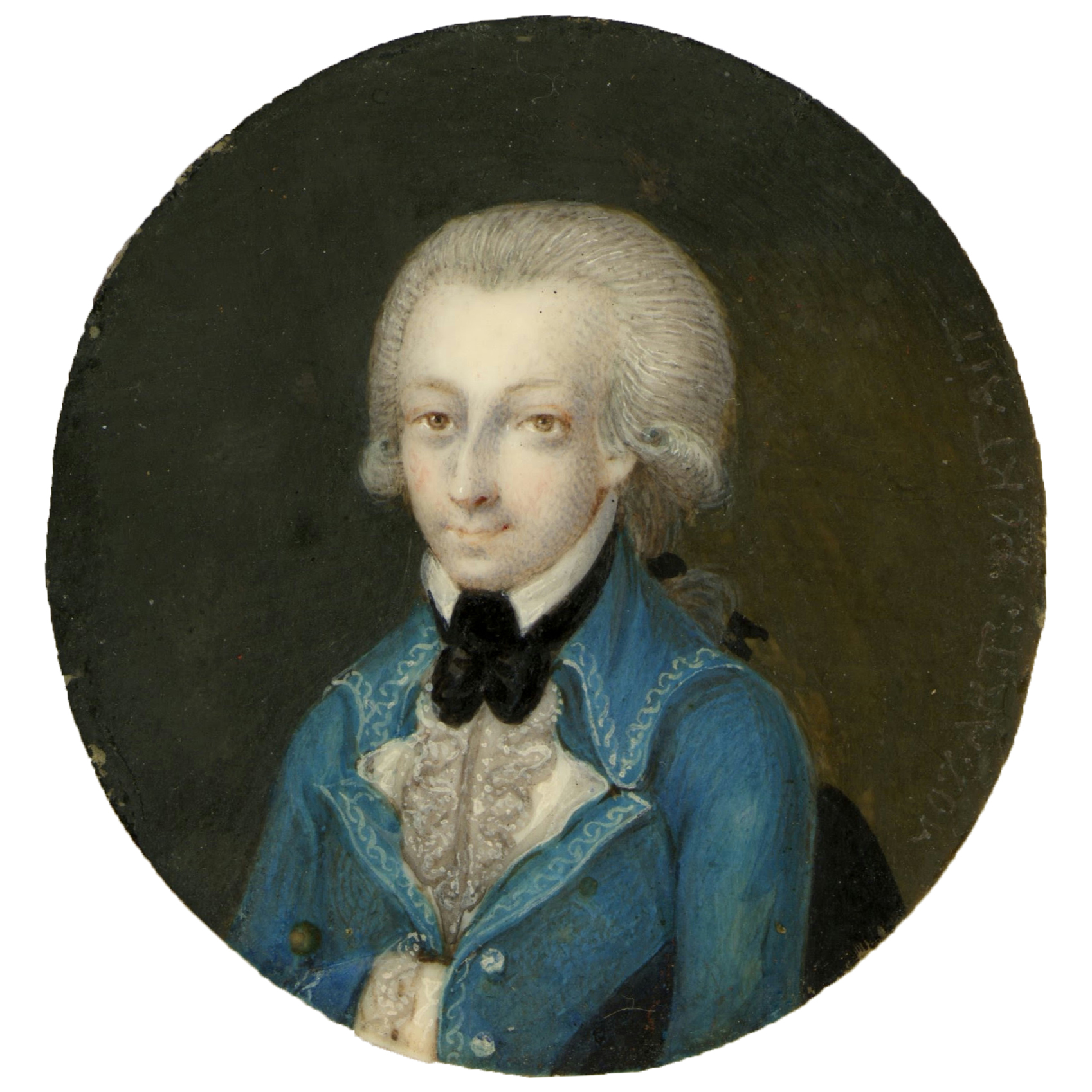
- 1773 miniature of Mozart
- Key: D major
- Catalogue: K. 175
- Composed: 1773
- Movements: 3
- Scoring: Piano; orchestra

I. Allegro

II. Andante ma un poco adagio

III. Rondo: Allegro

Piano Concerto No. 5 in D major, K. 175, was composed by the then seventeen-year-old Wolfgang Amadeus Mozart in 1773. It is Mozart's first original piano concerto; his previous efforts were based on works by other composers. In 1782, he revised the score and composed a new rondo, adding a flute to the instrumentation (K. 382).

== Instrumentation ==
The work is scored for 2 oboes, 2 horns in D, 2 trumpets in D, timpani, and strings and was the only concerto with trumpets and timpani until No. 10, K. 365. The second movement omits the trumpets and timpani.

== Movements ==
The three movements of the concerto are listed as follows:

1. Allegro
2. Andante ma un poco adagio (in G major)
3. Rondo: Allegro

This concerto was a favorite of Mozart's and is mentioned in many of his letters. The autograph manuscript, which was last reported to be in the possession of F. A. Grassnick in 1862, is now lost. Before 1860, it was in the possession of Johann August André and was bound together with K. 238. According to the Köchel catalogue, it bore the heading Concerto per il Clavicembalo del Sgr. Cavaliere Amadeo Wolfgango Mozart nel Decembre 1773, and comprised 54 folios with 107 sides used.
