= Piano Concerto No. 19 (Mozart) =

1784 composition by W. A. Mozart

- by W. A. Mozart
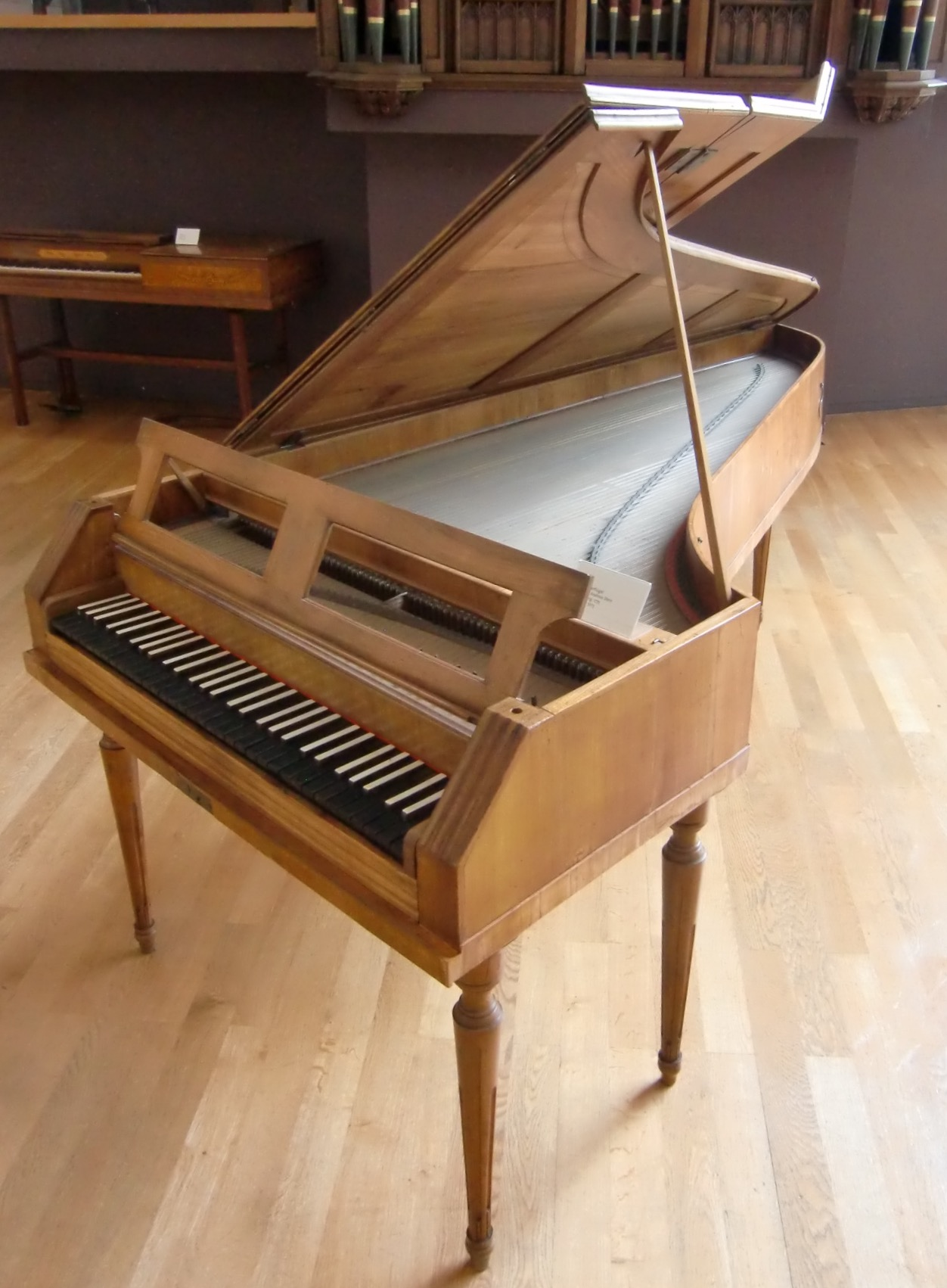
- Fortepiano by Johann Andreas Stein (Augsburg, 1775) – Berlin, Musikinstrumenten-Museum
- Key: F major
- Catalogue: K. 459
- Composed: 1784
- Movements: Three (Allegro, Allegretto, Allegro assai)
- Scoring: Piano; orchestra

The Piano Concerto No. 19 in F major, K. 459 by Wolfgang Amadeus Mozart was written at the end of 1784: Mozart's own catalogue of works records that it was completed on 11 December (works surrounding it in the Köchel catalogue are K. 458, the "Hunt" quartet and K. 464, the fifth of the Haydn set). It is part of a series of concertos composed in quick succession; of the eleven works between K. 449 and K. 459, six are piano concertos.

It is occasionally known as the "second coronation concerto" on account of Mozart playing it on the occasion of the coronation of Leopold II in Frankfurt am Main in October 1790.

The autograph is held by the Berlin State Library. The first edition was produced by Johann André of Offenbach in 1794, and Breitkopf & Härtel produced an edition in 1800. Simon P Keefe, writing in the Cambridge Mozart Encyclopedia comments that "the first and second movements of K. 459 contain particularly rich dialogue between the piano and winds, quickly establishing and maintaining an atmosphere of intimate collaboration".

== Music ==
Like most of Mozart's concertos it is in three movements:

1. Allegro
2. Allegretto 6/8 in C major
3. Allegro assai 2/4

The concerto was written for Mozart to perform himself: Hutchings calls it "athletic", combining grace with vigour. It is scored for flute, two oboes, two bassoons, two horns, and strings. Cliff Eisen notes that Mozart's own catalogue of his works lists the concerto as having trumpet and timpani parts, but these do not survive.

=== I. Allegro ===
I. Allegro

II. Allegretto

III. Allegro assai

The first movement is in cut time, and it is the only first movement of a piano concerto by Mozart to be written in cut time. The first bar of the theme (see example below) uses a rhythmic pattern that this concerto shares with the first movement themes of preceding three concertos, K. 451, K. 453 and K. 456.

The orchestra opens quietly with a prelude of 71 bars (Hutchings incorrectly states 72), wherein six orchestral themes are exposed (A–F in Hutchings' notation; see main article on Mozart piano concertos for a discussion of this notation), of which the first, rhythmical and with a military ambiance, becomes increasingly important as the movement progresses; indeed, its insistent rhythm dominates the entire movement. The piano then answers with its own exposition of 116 bars, starting with A and B, then introducing some new material (themes x and y), with free passages of arpeggios and scales: the scheme is ABxAyA Free D Free.

The orchestra then returns on its own with its short first ritornello (22 bars) that introduces another theme, G: the scheme is AGAG. In the ensuing middle section (35 bars), yet another orchestral theme is introduced, H: the scheme is HAHAHA. This is followed by a long recapitulation, also of 116 bars, where, as is typical of his concertos, Mozart rapidly departs from a simple repetition of the previous material: the scheme is ABAyADA Free. Finally, the movement is brought to a close with the final ritornello (36 bars): AGA Cadenza (Mozart's own exists) EF – hence the two closing themes of the prelude are finally heard again at the end.

==== Analysis ====
The analysis is based on, and expanded from the scheme of Hutchings, by reference to the score. Girdlestone's implied scheme differs somewhat (for example, he recognises seven themes in the prelude: the extra one is identified as the "subsidiary theme" below).

Prelude (orchestra)

Bars:
1–16 A (2 x 8 bars, first p then f)
16–24 B
24–36 C plus short passage (32–36) connecting to D (this reoccurs constantly with D and thus could be considered part of it)
37–54 D (37–42), plus subsidiary theme linking to E
54–62 E – first closing theme
62–71 F – second closing theme

Exposition

72–79 A (piano)
79–87 A (piano plus orchestra)
87–95 B (in orchestra, piano accompanies), modulates to C major at end
95–99 x (piano)
100–105 x (piano plus orchestra) then short passage connecting to A
106–111 A (orchestra), still in C
111–130 A (piano plus orchestra), in d minor then modulates through suspensions through various keys
130–138 y (orchestra) in C major
138–148 y (piano, but with strings at 142–44)
149–164 A (fragments of the rhythm in orchestra, piano accompanies), modulates through various keys
164–167 linking passage similar to 32–36 (in orchestra, piano accompanies), in C major
168–171 D (orchestra, piano accompanies), in F major again
171–177 linking passage similar to 32–36 (in orchestra, piano accompanies)
178–180 D (piano, orchestra accompanies)
181–188 Free passage, based on the triplets of D (piano with orchestral accompaniment), finishing on the shake at 178 on D, signifying the end of the exposition.

First ritornello (orchestra)

189–194 A, in C major
194–201 G
202–206 A (repeated fragments)
207–210 G

Middle section

211–212 H (piano), in a minor
213–214 A (orchestra, piano accompanies)
215–216 H (piano), in a minor
217–235 A (orchestra and piano closely tied, switching theme back and forward)
235–240 H (a free version, piano)
241–246 A (orchestra), modulating to return to F major for the recapitulation

Recapitulation

247–254 A (piano), in F major
255–262 A (orchestra)
262–273 B (orchestra, piano accompanies)
273–278 A (orchestra)
278–285 A (piano, orchestra accompanies)
286–297 A (orchestra, piano accompanies, 291–293 linking passage)
297–305 y (orchestra)
305–315 y (piano, on its own apart from 309–311)
316–330 A (orchestra, piano accompanies)
330–334 transition passage to D, like 32–36 (orchestra, piano accompanies)
335–340 D (orchestra, piano accompanies), 338–340 linking passage by piano
340–347 subsidiary theme like 42–49 (piano, orchestra accompanies)
348–352 transition passage like 32–36 (orchestra, piano accompanies) leading to D
353–359 D (piano, orchestra accompanies), 356–359 linking passage
360–366 A (orchestra, piano accompanies)
367–368 A (piano, orchestra accompanies)
369–370 A (orchestra, piano accompanies)
371–378 Free passage, piano in broken chord triplets, leading to shake on g at 378 signifying the end of the recapitulation.

Final ritornello (orchestra apart from cadenza)

379–384 A
384–390 G
390–392 A (fragment)
392 Cadenza (piano: Mozart's is 37 bars long, K. 626aI/58)
393–401 E
401–410 F

Themes

A (first appearance: bar 1)

B (first appearance: bar 16)

C (first appearance: bar 24)

D (first appearance: bar 37)

E (first appearance: bar 54)

F (first appearance: bar 64)

x (first appearance: bar 95)

y (first appearance: bar 130; below is the piano version at 138)

G (first appearance: bar 194)

H (first appearance: bar 211)

=== II. Allegretto ===
This gentle movement is in a condensed sonata form, with an ABAB structure (i.e. like a sonata form without the middle section). Each of the two major themes, the first major, the second minor, is broadly presented and varied; Mozart slightly varies the second presentation in B to avoid exact repetition. The movement is closed with highly characteristic use of the woodwind in quiet rising scales.

==== Analysis ====
Exposition

1–10 A (orchestra)
10–14 B (orchestra)
15–20 Connecting passage, modulating through various keys back to C major
21–25 A (orchestra)
26–29 A (piano)
30–35 A (passes back and forwards between piano and orchestra)
35–38 C new thematic material, passing into
39–43 free passage that modulates to G major
44–47 A (orchestra), in G major treated canonically
48–51 A (piano, orchestra accompanies), in G major treated canonically
52–57 D new thematic material (piano), closing the first group
58–61 E Opening of second group with unprepared modulation to g minor (orchestra)
62–66 E (piano, strings accompany)
67–70 F new thematic material in orchestra
71–73 same, with piano, modulating to G major at end
74–76 G (piano in G major)
76–77 G (orchestra, piano accompanies)
77–78 connecting passage (piano)
79–85 H (piano, orchestra accompanies) turning into free passage that modulates back to C major at the close for the recapitulation.

Recapitulation

86–95 A (piano first, then both), treated in a varied way
95–98 C (piano, orchestra accompanies. almost identical to 35–38), passing into
99–102 free passage that modulates into G major, then immediately back to C major
103–111 A treated canonically as in 48–51, extended (piano and orchestra together)
111–116 D (piano) in C major,
116–120 E (orchestra), this time in c minor
121–124 E (piano, orchestra accompanies), still c minor
125–129 F (orchestra), c minor
129–135 same, with piano, modulating to C major at end
135–136 G (orchestra)
136–141 connecting passage (piano, orchestra accompanies)
141–146 H (piano, orchestra accompanies) turning into free passage that leads back to A stays in C major
146–150 A (orchestra plus piano)

Coda

150–155 scales in orchestra
156–159 A – final, ornamented statement by piano, accompanied by the orchestral scales.

Themes

A (first appearance: bar 1)

=== III. Allegro assai ===
The movement, described by Girdlestone as the concerto's strongest movement, is in a broadly rondo form. In contrast to the languid second movement, the theme is sharply defined and introduced by the piano, quickly followed by the winds. The theme establishes the main motif of this piece: quaver-quaver-crotchet, quaver-quaver-crotchet. The two quavers in each group of three notes are of identical pitch. This motif is in fact used very frequently throughout the piece, a technique similar to the motif development used by Beethoven in his Symphony No. 5, first movement.

The orchestra then comes up with the second theme – a scalar passage which is then presented in a contrapuntal fashion. The piano remains silent during this time. Then the piano makes its re-entrance and starts off with runs. The orchestra provides continuous accompaniment with the main motif and different themes. At one point the opening material returns and the second theme is played again, though not in the same pitch or with the same instrumentation. The treatment is contrapuntal but somewhat looser than previously, the piano now playing along with the orchestra.

A sweeping passage by piano and then by orchestra leads into the cadenza which provides a temporary break from the relentless exhilaration of the movement. After the cadenza comes the coda where the main theme is built up bit by bit to a conclusion. The piece closes with three emphatic chords played by all instruments, including piano.
