= Arthur Hutchings =

British musicologist and composer

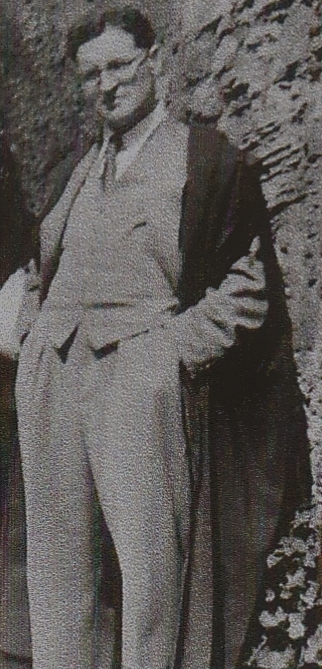

Arthur James Bramwell Hutchings (14 July 1906 – 13 November 1989) was an English musicologist, composer and professor of music.

== Life ==
Born in Sunbury-on-Thames, Hutchings had no formal musical education but played piano and violin to a high standard and sang as a chorister. He taught, performed and composed, and was appointed organist at All Saints Church, East Sheen in 1929. While training as a teacher in London he made some key musical friendships during the 1930s: with Constant Lambert, Cecil Gray, Sorabji, Cyril Rootham (who offered advice on orchestration in 1938, the last year of his life) and Edmund Rubbra (who dedicated his Third Symphony to Hutchings in 1939).

In 1938 Hutchings became music master at Southend High School for Boys, where one of his pupils was Bernard Stevens. He wrote the school song in 1939, and in 1941 married the school secretary, Marie Constance Haverson. During this period he conducted the Southend String Orchestra. When war was declared he acted as an entertainment officer in the UK, before a period serving with the Royal Air Force in India. While in India he took a keen interest in the local music.

After completing his war service in 1947 Hutchings was appointed as the first resident professor of music at Durham University where in 1953 he completed a thesis on Mozart's piano concertos for his doctorate. The musicologists Peter Evans, Donald Mitchell and Eric Roseberry were among his students at Durham. Mitchell recalled that he gained a reputation for his eccentricity and unconventional approach while at Durham. "He was exuberantly pro-music and opposed, perhaps not so much to the properly academic as to the paralytic academicism. His appointment...knocked a few holes in windows that had been overlaid by blinkered, unthinking tradition".

In 1968 he was appointed as the first professor of music at the University of Exeter, retiring three years later, where he lived at 20d Larkshayes, Dalwood, near Axminster. He became a widower in 1975, and soon afterwards his only daughter Josephine (born 1944) was killed in a traffic accident. Towards the end of his life he moved to the village of Colyton. He died in Devon, aged 83.

== Writing and composition ==
Under the mentorship of Harvey Grace, Hutchings began writing articles on musical topics for the Musical Times and other journals from 1935. He wrote extensively on topics as varied as nineteenth-century English liturgical composition, Schubert, Purcell, Edmund Rubbra, and baroque concertos. His most famous book was the Companion to Mozart's Piano Concertos, published in 1948 and often reissued since. Kingsley Amis listed it as one of the "vital book" on the single shelf in his study, and later provided a foreword to Mozart – Man and Musician (1976). Among his other books are The Invention and Composition of Music and Church Music in the Nineteenth Century. During the late 1970s his articles on music regularly appeared in the monthly magazine Records and Recording, as well as Music & Letters and The Listener.

His compositional activities largely ceased once writing and teaching became his major concerns. He mostly wrote Anglican church music, including a Magnificat & Nunc Dimittis in B minor (1934), a Communion Service on Russian Themes, and various anthems, as well as organ music (the four Seasonal Preludes of 1984, each based on a popular hymn tune), and a large scale choral work, O quanta qualia, for double chorus, brass band and orchestra. Hutchings served for many years as a director of the English Hymnal Company and three of his tunes were included in the 1986 New English Hymnal. There were also two comic operas (The Royal Arms in 1949, and Marriage à la Mode, after Dryden) in 1956, a secular cantata Heart's Desire, and a few orchestral works, including a Suite for Strings, an overture Oriana Triumphans and The Shocking Affair: variations in pastiche style for strings.

== Publications ==
- Schubert (Master Musicians series 1945)
- ‘Edmund Rubbra’, in British Music of Our Time (Pelican, 1946)
- Delius – a Critical Biography (1948)
- Companion to the Mozart Piano Concertos (1948)
- The Invention and Composition of Music (1958)
- The Baroque Concerto (1961)
- Church Music in the Nineteenth Century (1967)
- 'The Nineteenth Century', in Pelican History of Music, Vol. 3 (1968)
- Introduction to Constant Lambert's Music Ho! (3rd edition, 1968)
- 'Music in Britain: 1918–1960', in New Oxford History of Music Vol. 10 (1974), pp. 503–68
- Mozart – Man and Musician (1976, foreword by Kingsley Amis)
- Purcell (BBC Music Guides, 1982)
