= Piano Concerto No. 11 (Mozart) =

Piano concerto in three movements by W. A. Mozart

- by W. A. Mozart
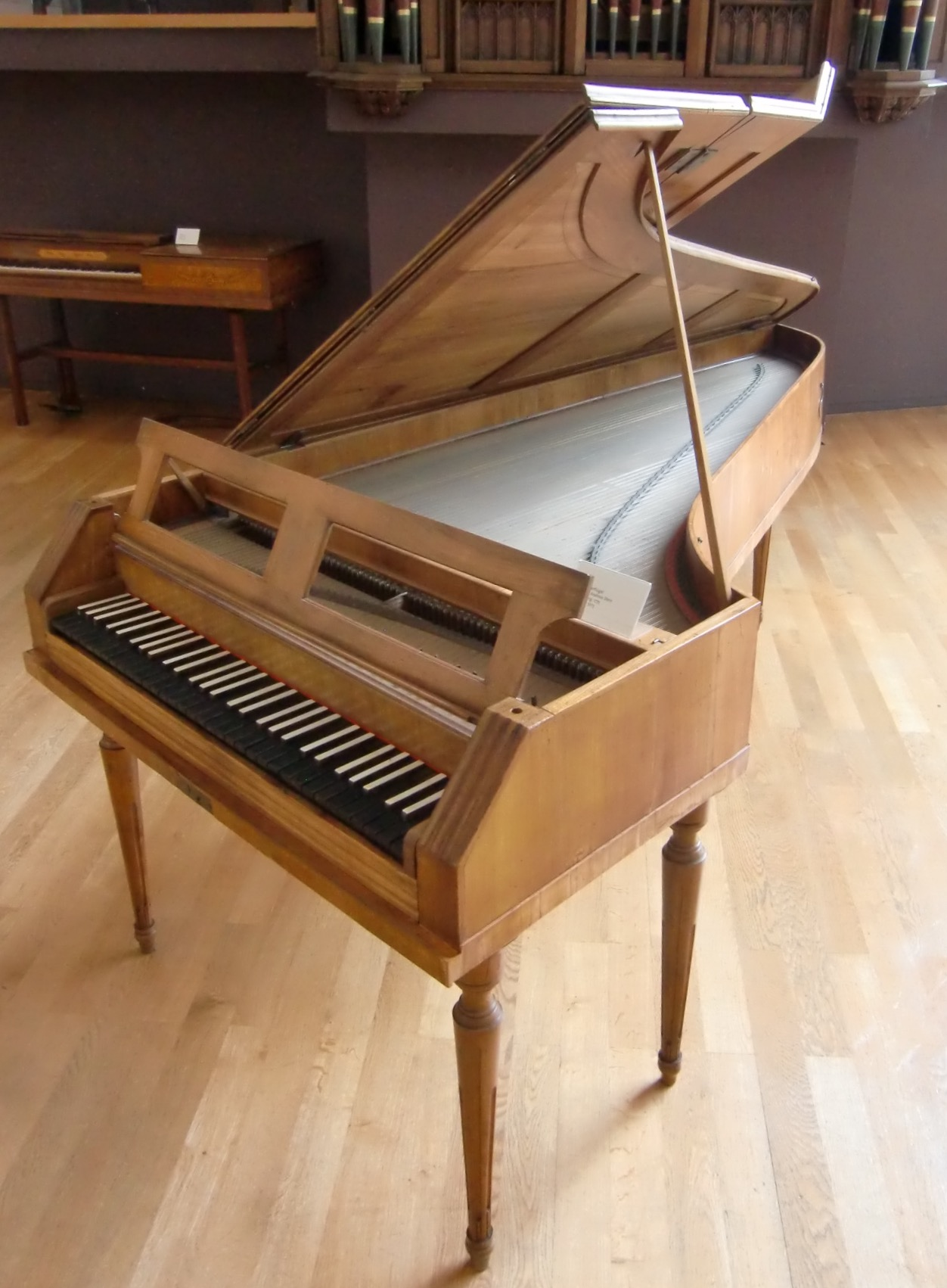
- Pianoforte de Johann Andreas Stein (Augsburg, 1775)- Berlin, Musikinstrumentenmuseum
- Key: F major
- Catalogue: K. 413
- Genre: Concerto
- Style: Classical period
- Composed: 1782
- Movements: Three (Allegro, Larghetto, Tempo di menuetto)
- Scoring: Piano; orchestra

Mozart's Piano Concerto No. 11 in F major, K. 413 (K. 387a in the sixth edition of the Köchel catalogue), was the second of the group of three early concertos he wrote when in Vienna, in the autumn of 1782 (according to the latest edition of the Köchel catalogue, K. 414 was written first). It was the first full concerto he wrote for the subscription concerts he gave in the city. The autograph is held by the Jagiellońska Library, Kraków with an additional, now incomplete, copy that Mozart brought to Salzburg in 1783, in the library of the Archabbey of St Peter's, Salzburg. The concerto is in the usual three movements:

1. Allegro in 3/4
2. Larghetto in 4/4 (in B♭ major)
3. Tempo di menuetto in 3/4

It is scored for solo keyboard (piano or harpsichord), two oboes, two bassoons (second movement only), two horns and strings. The winds and brass do not play an important role throughout the concerto, and Mozart himself advertised an "a quattro" version, which is for string quartet and keyboard only, presumably for domestic use. As per 18th century performance practice a string orchestra could also have provided as a suitable option for the "quattro" accompaniment.

The time signatures of the concerto are slightly unusual: Mozart wrote only three other keyboard concertos with first movements in 3/4 (Nos. 4, K. 41, 14, K. 449, and 24, K. 491). In the first movement, Mozart definitively modulates to the dominant, C major, when he introduces the second subject in the prelude before returning to F major 8 bars later; a scheme also followed in No. 14.

The second movement is in binary form.

The third movement, on the other hand, is unusual both in its minuet form, and in its variation of the normal rondo structure.
