= Piano Concerto No. 16 (Mozart) =

- by W. A. Mozart
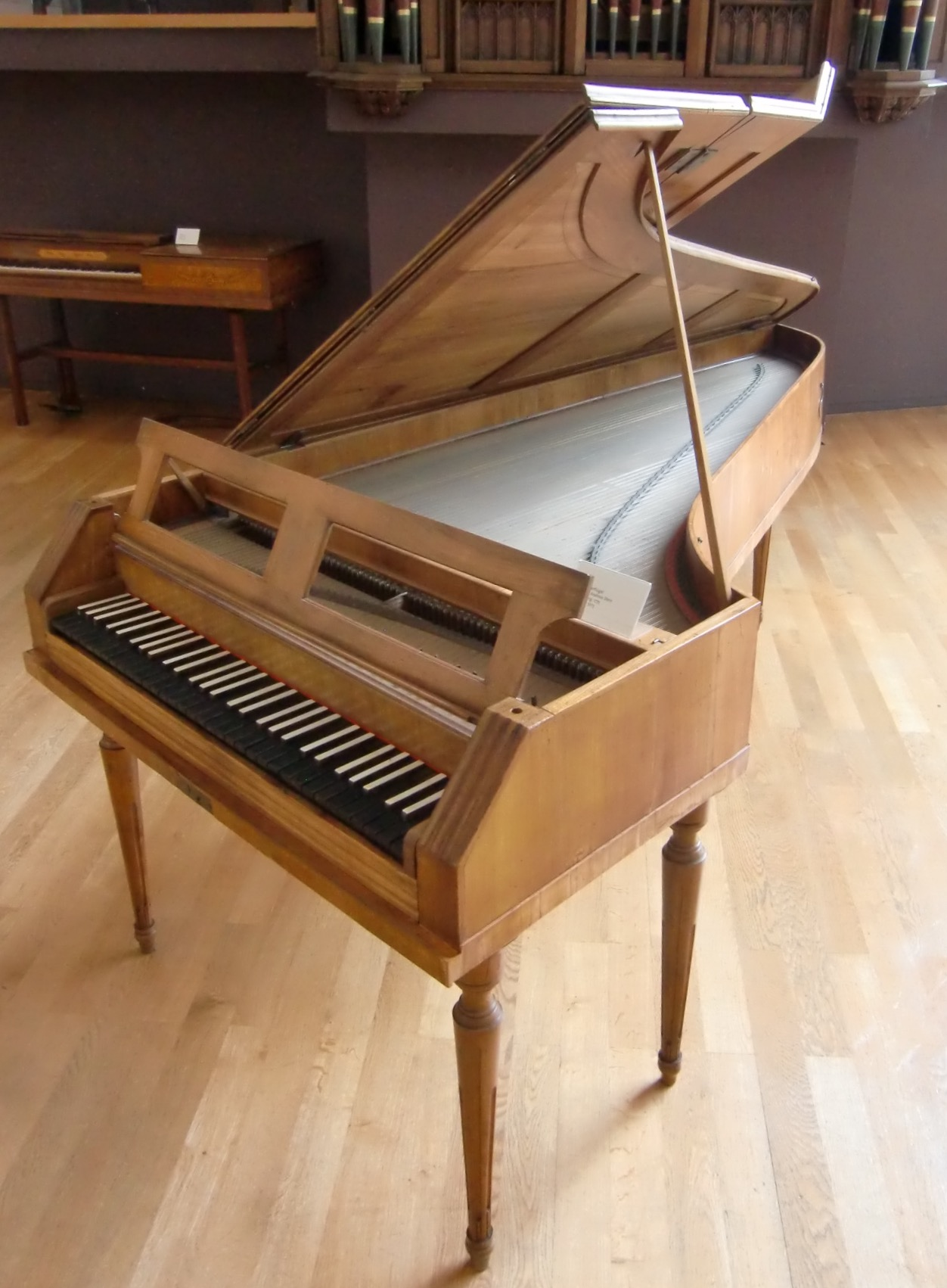
- Pianoforte by Johann Andreas Stein (Augsburg, 1775) – Berlin, Musikinstrumenten-Museum
- Key: D major
- Catalogue: K. 451
- Composed: 1784
- Movements: Three (Allegro assai, Andante, Allegro di molto)
- Scoring: Piano; orchestra
- I. Allegro assai II. Andante III. Allegro di molto

The Piano Concerto No. 16 in D major, K. 451, is a concertante work for piano, or pianoforte, and orchestra by Wolfgang Amadeus Mozart. Mozart composed the concerto for performance at a series of concerts at the Vienna venues of the Trattnerhof and the Burgtheater in the first quarter of 1784, where he was himself the soloist. Mozart noted this concerto as complete on 22 March 1784 in his catalog, and performed the work later that month. Cliff Eisen has postulated that this performance was on 31 March 1784.

== Music ==
The work is orchestrated for solo piano, flute, two oboes, two bassoons, two horns, two trumpets, timpani and strings. The concerto is in three movements:

1. Allegro assai
2. Andante in G major
3. Rondo. Allegro di molto

Simon Keefe has noted contemporary comments from Mozart's era on how the woodwind writing in this concerto showed a "newly intricate and sophisticated" character compared to Mozart's prior keyboard concerti. M. S. Cole has noted Mozart's use of meter changes in the coda of the finale, starting at measure 315, from 2/4 to 3/8, and subsequent thematic transformations. Joel Galand has noted that the finale, in rondo-ritornello form, avoids use of a new re-entry theme.
