= List of compositions by Nikolai Medtner =

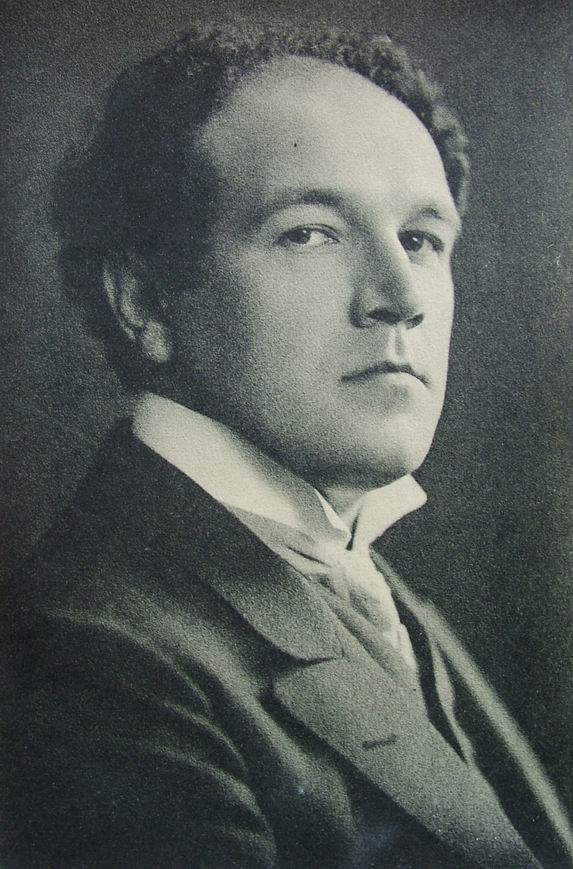
Nikolai Medtner, postcard (1910)

This is a list of compositions by Nikolai Medtner by genre.

== Concertante ==
- Piano Concerto No. 1 in C minor, Op. 33 (1914–18)
- Piano Concerto No. 2 in C minor, Op. 50 (1920–27)
- Piano Concerto No. 3 Ballade (Баллада) in E minor, Op. 60 (1940–43)

== Chamber music ==
- 3 Nocturnes (Три ноктюрна) for violin and piano, Op. 16 (1904–08)
- Sonata No. 1 in B minor for violin and piano, Op. 21 (1904–10)
- 2 Canzonas with Dances (Две канцоны с танцами; 2 Canzonen mit Tänzen) for violin and piano, Op. 43 (1922–24)
- Sonata No. 2 in G major for violin and piano, Op. 44 (1922–25)
- Sonata No. 3 Epica (Эпическая соната) in E minor for violin and piano, Op. 57 (1935–38)
- Piano Quintet in C major, Op. posth. (1950)

== Two pianos ==
- March (Марш; Marsch) in C major (1897); unpublished
- 2 Pieces, Op. 58 (1940–45)

1. Russian Round Dance (Русский хоровод) (1940)
2. Knight Errant (Странствующий рыцарь) (1940–45)

== Piano ==
- Adagio funèbre (Траурное адажио) in E minor (1894–95); unpublished
- 8 Mood Pictures (Восемь картин; 8 Stimmungsbilder), Op. 1 (c. 1895–1902)
- 3 Fantastic Improvisations (Три фантастические импровизации), Op. 2 (1896–1900)
- 3 Pieces (Три пьесы) (1895–96); unpublished

1. Pastorale (Пастораль) in C major
2. Moment musical (Музыкальный момент; Musikalischer Moment) in C minor
3. Humoresque (Юмореска) in F♯ minor

- Prelude (Прелюдия; Präludium) in B minor (1895–1896); unpublished
- 6 Preludes (Шесть прелюдий) (1896–97); unpublished
- Prelude (Прелюдия) in E♭ major (1897); unpublished
- Impromptu alla mazurka (Экспромт в духе мазурки) in B♭ minor (1897); unpublished
- Piece (Пьеса) (1897); unpublished
- Sonata in B minor (1897); unpublished
- 4 Pieces (Четыре пьесы; 4 Morceaux), Op. 4 (1897–1902)
- Impromptu (Экспромт) in F minor (1898); unpublished
- Sonatina (Сонатина) in G minor (1898); published posthumously in 1981
- Sonata in F minor, Op. 5 (1901–1903)
- Album Leaf (Листок из альбома) (1900); unpublished
- 3 Arabesques (Три арабески), Op. 7 (1901–04)
- 2 Fairy Tales (Skazki) (Две сказки; 2 Märchen), Op. 8 (1904–05)
- 3 Fairy Tales (Skazki) (Три сказки; 3 Märchen), Op. 9 (1904–05)
- 3 Dithyrambs (Три дифирамба), Op. 10 (1898–1906)
- Sonaten-Triade (Сонатная Триада), Op. 11 (1904–07)

1. Sonata in A♭ major
2. Sonata-Elegy (Соната-элегия) in D minor
3. Sonata in C major

- 2 Fairy Tales (Skazki) (Две сказки; 2 Märchen), Op. 14 (1905–07)
- 3 Novellas (Три новеллы), Op. 17 (1908–09)
- 2 Fairy Tales (Skazki) (Две сказки; 2 Märchen), Op. 20 (1909)
- Sonata in G minor, Op. 22 (1901–10)
- 4 Lyrical Fragments (Четыре лирических фрагмента), Op. 23 (1896–1911)
- 2 Cadenzas for Beethoven's Piano Concerto No. 4 (Две каденции к Четвёртому фортепианному концерту Бетховена) (1910)
- 2 Sonatas, Op. 25 (1910–11)

1. Sonata-Skazka (Sonata-Fairy Tale; Соната-сказка) in C minor
2. Sonata Night Wind (Ночной ветер) in E minor

- 4 Fairy Tales (Skazki) (Четыре сказки), Op. 26 (1910–12)
- Etude (Этюд) in C minor (1912)
- Etude (Этюд) in E minor (1912?); unpublished
- Sonata-Ballada (Соната-баллада) in F♯ major, Op. 27 (1912–14)
- Sonata in A minor, Op. 30 (1914)
- 3 Pieces (Три пьесы), Op. 31 (1914)
- Fairy Tale (Skazka) (Сказка) in D minor (1915)
- Andante con moto in B♭ (1916); unpublished
- 4 Fairy Tales (Skazki) (Четыре сказки), Op. 34 (1916–17)
- 4 Fairy Tales (Skazki) (Четыре сказки), Op. 35 (1916–17)
- Forgotten Melodies, Cycle I (Забытые мотивы; Vergessene Weisen), Op. 38 (1919–22)
- Forgotten Melodies, Cycle II (Забытые мотивы; Vergessene Weisen), Op. 39 (1919–20)
- Forgotten Melodies, Cycle III (Забытые мотивы; Vergessene Weisen), Op. 40 (1919–20)
- 3 Fairy Tales (Skazki) (Три сказки), Op. 42 (1921–24)
- Improvisation No. 2 "In the Form of Variations" (Вторая импровизация во форме вариаций), Op. 47 (1925–26)
- 2 Fairy Tales (Skazki) (Две сказки; 2 Märchen), Op. 48 (1925)
- 3 Hymns of Toil (Три гимна труду; 3 Hymnen an die Arbeit), Op. 49 (1926–28)
- 6 Fairy Tales (Skazki) (Шесть сказок), Op. 51 (1928)
- 2 Sonatas, Op. 53 (1929–31)

1. Sonata romantica (Романтическая соната) in B♭ minor (1929–30)
2. Sonata minacciosa (Грозовая соната; Tempest Sonata) in F minor (1929–31)

- 2 Easy Piano Pieces (Две лёгких фортепианных пьесы) in B♭ major and A minor (1931?); unpublished
- Romantic Sketches for the Young (Романтические эскизы для юношества; Romantische Skizzen für die Jugend), Op. 54 (1931–32)
- Theme and Variations (Тема с вариациями; Tema con variazioni), Op. 55 (1932–33)
- Sonata-Idyll (Соната-идиллия) in G major, Op. 56 (1935–37)
- 2 Elegies (Две элегии), Op. 59 (1940–44)

== Vocal ==
- Prayer (Молитва) for voice and piano (1896); words by Mikhail Lermontov; unpublished
- The Angel (Ангел) for voice and piano, Op. 1bis (1901–08); words by Mikhail Lermontov; reworking of the Mood Picture, Op. 1 No. 1
- 3 Romances (Три романса) for voice and piano, Op. 3 (1903); words by Mikhail Lermontov, Alexander Pushkin and Afanasy Fet after Goethe
- 9 Songs after Goethe (Девять песен Гёте; Goethe-Lieder) for voice and piano, Op. 6 (c. 1901–05); words by Johann Wolfgang von Goethe
- 3 Poems after Heine (Три стихотворения Гейне) for voice and piano, Op. 12 (1907); words by Heinrich Heine
- 2 Songs (Две песни) for voice and piano, Op. 13 (1901–07); words by Alexander Pushkin and Andrei Bely
- 12 Songs after Goethe (Двенадцать песен Гёте) for voice and piano, Op. 15 (1905–07); words by Johann Wolfgang von Goethe
- 6 Poems after Goethe (Шесть стихотворений Гёте) for voice and piano, Op. 18 (1905–09); words by Johann Wolfgang von Goethe
- 3 Poems after Nietzsche (Три стихотворения Ницше) for voice and piano, Op. 19 (1907–09); words by Friedrich Nietzsche
- 2 Poems after Nietzsche (Два стихотворения Ницше) for voice and piano, Op. 19a (1910–11); words by Friedrich Nietzsche
- 8 Poems after Tyutchev and Fet (Восемь стихотворений Тютчева и Фета) for voice and piano, Op. 24 (1911); words by Fyodor Tyutchev and Afanasy Fet
- 7 Poems after Fet, Bryusov and Tyutchev (Семь стихотворений Фета, Брюсова, Тютчева) for voice and piano, Op. 28 (1913); words by Afanasy Fet, Valery Bryusov and Fyodor Tyutchev
- 7 Poems after Pushkin (Семь стихотворений Пушкина) for voice and piano, Op. 29 (1913); words by Alexander Pushkin
- 6 Poems after Pushkin (Шесть стихотворений Пушкина) for voice and piano, Op. 32 (1915); words by Alexander Pushkin
- 6 Poems after Pushkin (Шесть стихотворений Пушкина) for voice and piano, Op. 36 (1918–19); words by Alexander Pushkin
- 5 Poems after Tyutchev and Fet (Пять стихотворений Тютчева и Фета) for voice and piano, Op. 37 (1918–20); words by Fyodor Tyutchev and Afanasy Fet
- Sonata-Vocalise (Соната-вокализ) for voice (without words) and piano, Op. 41 No. 1 (1922)
- Suite-Vocalise (Сюита-вокализ) for voice (without words) and piano, Op. 41 No. 2 (1927)
- 4 Poems (Четыре стихотворения) for voice and piano, Op. 45 (1922–24); words by Alexander Pushkin and Fyodor Tyutchev
- 7 Poems (Семь стихотворений) for voice and piano, Op. 46 (1922–24); words by Johann Wolfgang von Goethe, Joseph Freiherr von Eichendorff and Adelbert von Chamisso
- 7 Songs on Poems of Pushkin (Семь песен на стихотворения А. С. Пушкина) for voice and piano, Op. 52 (1928–29); words by Alexander Pushkin
- 8 Songs on Russian and German Poems (Восемь песен на стихи русских и немецких поэтов; 7 hinterlassene Lieder) for voice and piano, Op. 61 (1927–51); words by Joseph Freiherr von Eichendorff, Alexander Pushkin, Mikhail Lermontov and Fyodor Tyutchev

No. 6 Midday (Полдень; Polden) (1936); words by Fyodor Tyutchev; initially published separately as Op. 59 No. 1

- Wie kommt es? for voice and piano (1946–49); words by Hermann Hesse; unpublished
