= Six Poems after Goethe (Medtner) =

Twelve Songs after Goethe
- Song cycle by Nikolai Medtner
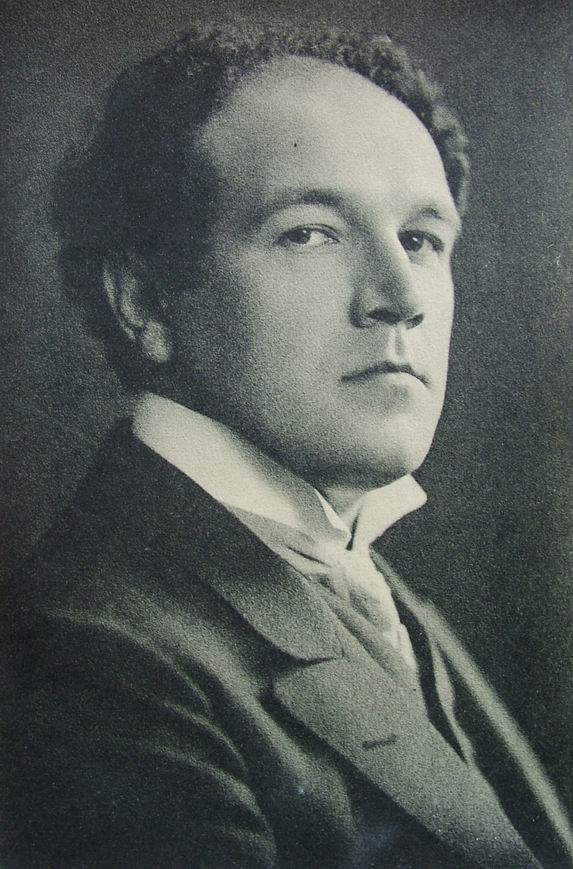
- The composer
- Native name: Шесть стихотворений В. Гёте
- Opus: 18
- Year: 1909
- Text: Johann Wolfgang von Goethe
- Published: 1910 - Moscow
- Publisher: Editions Russes de Musique
- Duration: 13 minutes approximately
- Movements: 6
- Scoring: Voice and piano

Six Poems after Goethe, Op. 18 (Russian: Шесть стихотворений В. Гёте, translit. Shest’ stikhotvoreniy V. Gyote) is a song cycle composed by Russian composer Nikolai Medtner after original poems by Johann Wolfgang von Goethe. Finished in 1909, it is Medtner's third song cycle completely devoted to Goethe.

== Background ==
The origin of the Six Poems is very intertwined with his previous song cycle of based on poems by Goethe, Twelve Songs after Goethe, Op. 15 (1909). They were written between 1908 and 1909, at a time when the composer became professionally involved with the singer Maria Olenina-d'Alheim. Medtner’s association with the singer began during the period when she had recently founded the House of Song (Dom pesni) in 1908. Established together with her husband, Pierre d'Alheim, the institution aimed to promote a serious and intellectually elevated approach to the performance of vocal music. Olenina-d'Alheim felt a particular sympathy for Medtner, whose works she admired for their “spiritual attitude to song.” Medtner became involved with the project as a programming adviser and also performed there as a pianist. On January 21, 1909, both Twelve Songs after Goethe, Op. 15, and Six Poems after Goethe, Op. 18 were premiered at a House of Song concert in the Small Hall of the Moscow Conservatory.

The composition was published by Éditions Russes de Musique in 1910. It has since been republished by Classical Vocal Reprints. An urtext edition of the collected works was also published in 1961 by Muzgiz in Moscow. Both the original and the reissued editions included the original German text alongside Russian translations made by a little-known translator by the name of O. Karatygina. For some songs she was assisted by Anatoly Mashistov (Nos. II and III) and Sergei Zayaitsky (No. V). The work was never formally translated into English; however, Henry S. Drinker produced an English translation in 1946 that was never published with the score.

The poems on which the songs are based bear the same titles as the songs themselves. “Die Bekehrte” (No. II) was written in 1796 and first published the following year. “Mignon” (No. IV) is an extract from Wilhelm Meister's Apprenticeship (1795), although the fragment was originally written in 1785. “Das Veilchen” comes from Erwin und Elmire (1775). Finally, “Jägers Abendlied” was written around 1775–1776 and first published in 1776.

== Structure ==
The cycle consists of six songs for voice and piano with a total duration of around 13 minutes. The list of songs is as follows:

Structure of Six Poems after Goethe, Op. 18
Piece No.	German title	Russian title	Title in English (Note: Translation into English provided by Henry S. Drinker in 1946.)	Tempo marking
I	Die Spröde	Недоступная Nedostupnaya	The Flirt	Allegro non troppo, giocosamente
II	Die Bekehrte	Обращенная Obrashchennaya	Conquered	Andante con moto
III	Einsamkeit	Одиночество Odinochestvo	Solitude	Moderato
IV	Mignon	Песня Миньоны Pesnya Min'ony	Mignon	Allegretto con moto
V	Das Veilchen (Ballade)	Фиалка (Баллада) Fialka (Ballada)	The Violet	Andante
VI	Jägers Abendlied	Вечерняя песнь охотника Vechernyaya pesn’ okhotnika	Hunter's Even-Song	Allegro

== Recordings ==
The composer never recorded the work in its entirety; however, like many performers both in his time and today, he recorded an excerpt. He recorded “Einsamkeit” (No. III) with the soprano Elisabeth Schwarzkopf. The recording was made at Abbey Road Studio No. 3 on October 16, 1950 and was released by Columbia, with later reissues by EMI Classics, ArkivMusic, Historic Recordings, and St-Laurent.

The following is a list of complete recordings of the work:

Recordings of Six Poems after Goethe, Op. 18
Soprano	Piano	Date of recording	Place of recording	Label
Ekaterina Levental	Frank Peters	April 2022	Westvest90, Schiedam, The Netherlands	Brilliant Classics
