= Eight Poems (Medtner) =

Eight Poems after Tyutchev and Fet
- by Nikolai Medtner
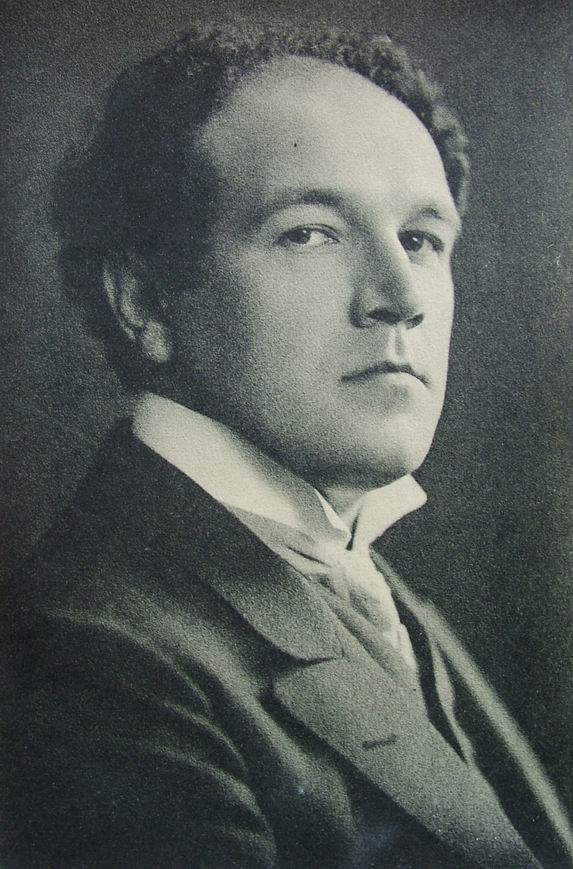
- Medtner, at the time of the composition
- Native name: Восемь стихотворений Тютчева и Фета
- Opus: 24
- Year: 1911
- Text: Poems by Fyodor Tyutchev and Afanasy Fet
- Language: Russian
- Dedication: Anna M. Ian-Ruban
- Published: 1912 - Paris
- Publisher: Éditions Russes de Musique
- Duration: 17 minutes approximately
- Movements: 8
- Scoring: Voice and piano

Eight Poems or Eight Poems after Tyutchev and Fet, Op. 24 (Russian: Восемь стихотворений Тютчева и Фета, translit. Vosem stikhotvorenii Tiutcheva i Feta), is a song cycle based on poems by Fyodor Tyutchev and Afanasy Fet by Russian composer Nikolai Medtner. It is scored for voice with piano accompaniment and was written in 1911.

== Background ==
This collection of setting to Russian poems was the first of eight groups of songs dedicated exclusively to Russian poets, an endeavor which started in the 1910s after completing his compositional exploration of Goethe's poetry. The work was composed prior to his departure for England, during his final years in Russia, shortly after he decided to dedicate himself fully to composition. The first four pieces in the set of Eight Poems are settings of poems by the Russian poet Fyodor Tyutchev, while the remaining four set poems by Afanasy Fet. The collection was finished in 1911.

The Eight Poems were dedicated to Anna Mikhailovna Ian-Ruban, a famous Russian chamber soprano. They were published in 1912 by Éditions Russes de Musique, in Paris. The pieces were initially published separately, in both Russian and German, with a German translation by Berthold Feiwel. A Russian-French edition was published in 1917, with a French translation by Michel Dimitri Calvocoressi, and additional editions in Russian-English and Russian-French were published in 1922. A collected works edition by Muzgiz was also released in 1961, with translations into German by various translators: E. Bach (No. I), Feiwel (Nos. II & III), W. Wischniak (Nos IV & V), and Friedrich Fiedler (Nos. VI, VII, & VIII). The set has been reprinted many times since then by other publishers.

== Structure ==
Eight Poems is made up for eight short settings to poems written for voice and piano accompaniment. They are typically performed by a high voice, as it was dedicated to a soprano and the vocal line lies in the soprano range. Its duration is approximately 17 minutes. The following is an overview of the structure of the poem cycle. In the table below, the English titles from Edward Agate's first English edition of 1922 are given in regular type, followed by the titles from Henry S. Drinker’s 1946 translation in smaller type.

Structure of Eight Poems after Tyutchev and Fet, Op. 24
| No. | Title | English title | Tempo marking |
|---|---|---|---|
| I | День и ночь (Den i noch) | Day and Night | Largamente, sereno |
| II | Что ты клонишь над водами (Chto ty klonish nad vodami) | Willow, Why Forever Bending? (The Willow) | Moderato, in modo rustico |
| III | Дума за думой, волна за волной (Duma za dumoy, volna za volnoy) | Sea-swell and Memories (Waves and Thoughts) | Largo dolente |
| IV | Сумерки (Sumerki) | Twilight | Quietissimo, pleghevole |
| V | Я потрясён, когда кругом (Ya potryason, kogda krugom) | O'er Thee I Bend (Humble Yet Valiant) | Sfrenatamente, con entusiasmo |
| VI | Только встречу улыбку твою (Tolko vstrechu ulybku tvoyu) | When My Glances Thy Smile Chance to Meet (Beauty) | Commodamente |
| VII | Шёпот, робкое дыханье (Shyopot, robkoye dykhanye) | Whisp'ring, Nature Faintly Stirring (Dawn in the Garden) | Andantino gracile |
| VIII | Я пришёл к тебе с приветом (Ya prishyol k tebe s privetom) | Greeting | Allegretto con moto animato e disinvolto |

== Recordings ==
Complete recordings of the entire set are quite rare, although individual songs are often recorded separately by various musicians and labels. Medtner himself recorded the second and seventh songs on September 6, 1947, at Abbey Road Studio No. 3 in London, with soprano Oda Slobodskaya. The following is a list of known complete recordings of the song cycle.

Recordings of Eight Poems after Tyutchev and Fet, Op. 24
| Soprano | Piano | Date of recording | Place of recording | Label |
|---|---|---|---|---|
| Ludmilla Andrew | Geoffrey Tozer | 1994 | The School of St Helen and St Katharine, Abingdon, Oxfordshire, UK | Chandos |
| Ekaterina Levental | Frank Peters | 2020 | Westvest90, Schiedam, The Netherlands | Brilliant Classics |
