= Two Fairy Tales, Op. 20 (Medtner) =

Two Fairy Tales
- by Nikolai Medtner
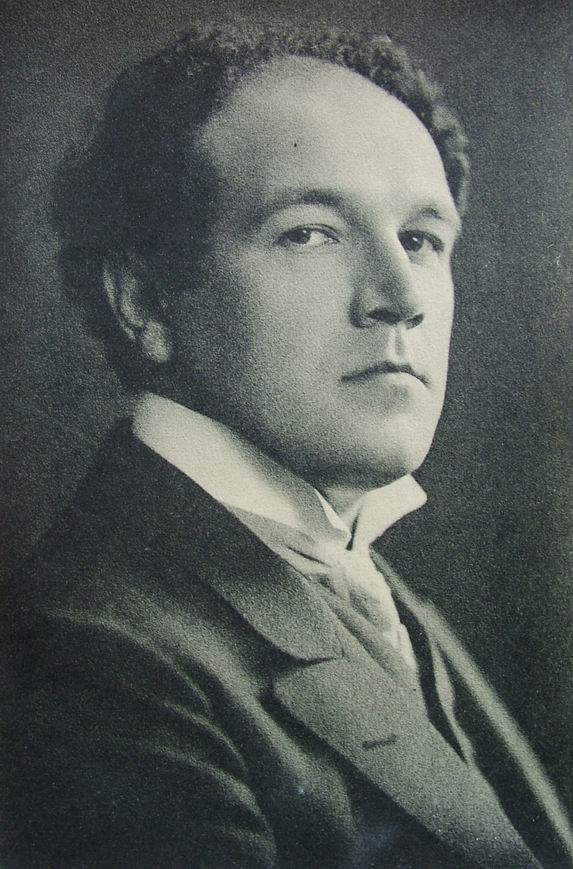
- Nikolai Medtner
- Native name: Двѣ сказки (or Двe сказки)
- Opus: 20
- Published: 1910
- Publisher: Berlin
- Duration: 6 minutes approximately
- Movements: 2
- Scoring: Piano

Two Fairy Tales or Two Tales, Op. 20 (Russian: Двѣ сказки or Двe сказки, translit. Dve skazki), is a composition for solo piano by Russian pianist and composer Nikolai Medtner. The fourth installment in the series of fairy tales for piano, it was written in 1909.

== Background ==
Between 1905 and 1928, Medtner wrote more than 30 pieces entitled "skazki" and wrongfully generally translated as "fairy tales", as Richard Holt and Eric Blom have noted that the term should have been translated as "tales", "legends", or "folk tales". This set of tales was completed in 1909 and published in 1910 in Berlin by Éditions Russes de Musique. Additional releases appeared in 1921, following Koussevitzky’s reconstitution of Éditions Russes de Musique; a Soviet edition was issued in 1923, and a further urtext edition appeared in 1959 in Moscow, published by Muzgiz as part of a collected works edition. It is nowadays republished by Dover (2001), St. Petersburg Music Publishing House (2006), Boosey & Hawkes (No. 1), and International Music Co. (No. 1).

Violinist Jascha Heifetz, known for his arrangements for violin and piano of famous contemporary works, created an arrangement of the first piece in this set, which was published in 1949 in New York by Carl Fischer and dedicated to Vladimir Horowitz.

== Structure ==
The two pieces that make up this work have a combined approximate duration of six minutes. They are written for solo piano. The movement list is as follows:

1. Allegro con espressione
2. Campanella – Song or Fairy Tale of a Bell, but Not about a Bell. Pesante. Minaccioso

The first piece is a tragic and dramatic work in B‑flat minor, featuring constant clashes between eighth notes and eighth‑note triplets. The second piece is somewhat more rhythmically defined, aiming to evoke the sound of large bells. It is in B minor and maintains a steady 3/8 meter throughout. Although the second piece’s title was omitted in the first published editions of the work, it was published in the 1959 collected edition, along with a footnote that read: "Observance of the instruction 'Sempre al rigore di tempo' is mandatory throughout the entire piece," which he emphasized in a handwritten copy reproduced by Natascha Konsistorum by writing: "Whoever finds it boring to play this al rigore di tempo had better leave this piece alone":

== Recordings ==
One of the most popular sets for solo piano, Two Fairy Tales has been recorded in full over 30 times by a variety of pianists, while the first piece has also been recorded separately more than 25 additional times. The following is an incomplete list of complete recordings of the work.

Piano	Date of recording	Place of recording	Label
Nikolai Medtner	March / April 1930	Central Hall, Westminster, London, UK	Appian / St‑Laurent / Hyperion
Nikolai Medtner	April 1936	Abbey Road Studio No. 3, London, UK	HMV / Victor / Melodiya / Aprelevka / EMI (and others)
Egon Petri	1958	Basel, Switzerland	Dell'Arte
Geoffrey Tozer	2000	Snape Maltings Concert Hall, Suffolk, UK	Chandos
Hamish Milne	October 2006	Henry Wood Hall, London, UK	Hyperion
Di Wu	2009	Van Cliburn Concert Hall, Fort Worth, Texas, USA	Cliburn Classics
Steven Osborne	December 2012	Henry Wood Hall, London, UK	Hyperion

== Reception ==
Although Nikolai Medtner did not achieve widespread public recognition during his lifetime, his Two Tales were highly regarded by fellow musicians and intellectuals. The Russian philosopher Ivan Ilyin described the first piece as “an outpouring of world sorrow, an outburst of suffering, as it were, imploring salvation.”
