= Seven Poems after Pushkin, Op. 29 (Medtner) =

Seven Poems after Pushkin
- by Nikolai Medtner
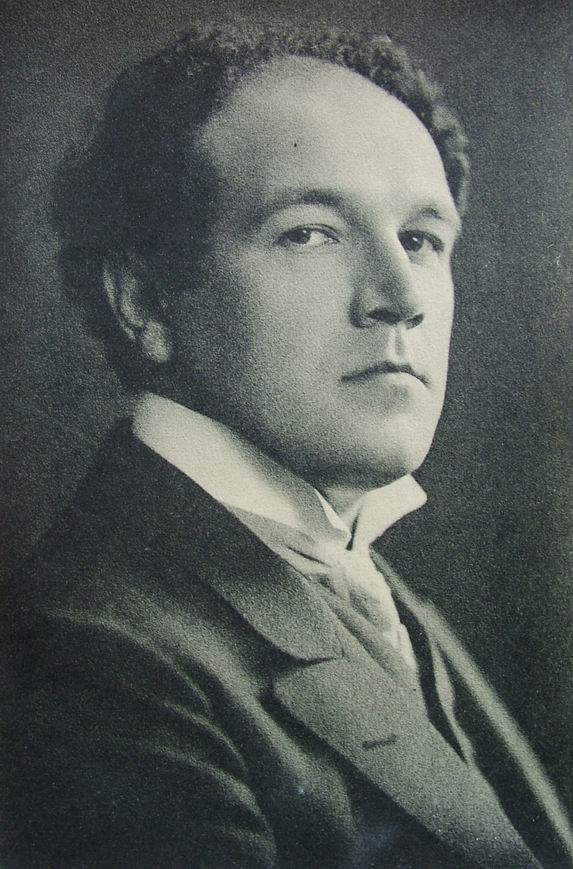
- Nikolai Medtner
- Native name: Семь стихотворений А. Пушкина
- Opus: 29
- Year: 1913
- Published: 1914 - Berlin
- Publisher: Éditions Russes de Musique
- Duration: 19 minutes approximately
- Movements: 7
- Scoring: Voice and piano

Seven Poems after Pushkin, Op. 29 (Russian: Семь стихотворений А. Пушкина, translit. Sem’ stikhotvoreniy A. Pushkina), is a song cycle based on poems by Alexander Pushkin composed by Nikolai Medtner.

== Background ==
The first song of the set, which appears to have been the earliest to be completed, was written in 1904. The remaining songs were composed later, and the complete cycle, Seven Poems, Op. 29, was finished in 1913. It was subsequently published in 1914 in Berlin by Éditions Russes de Musique. The texts were translated into French and English by Michel-Dimitri Calvocoressi. An urtext edition of the collected works appeared in 1961, published in Moscow by Muzgiz. For this edition, the poems were translated into German by Johannes von Guenther (Nos. I, II, III, and V), W. Wischniak (No. IV), and Friedrich Martin von Bodenstedt (Nos. VI and VII). Two different unpublished piano transcriptions of No. I have been released on recording by Alan Weiss (2018) and Vittorio Forte (2022).

With the exception of the first song, none of the songs in the set carries a dedication. The Muse (No. 1) is dedicated to the Russian writer Marietta Shaginyan. Notably, both Nikolai Medtner and Sergei Rachmaninoff set the same Pushkin poem and dedicated their respective settings to her. Medtner also reused several motifs from this song in both his Sonate-Ballade, Op. 27, and his Piano Quintet, which he worked on over a period of 44 years. It remains unclear whether these themes were composed first for the song cycle or for the quintet.

== Structure ==
This song cycle consists of seven songs based on poems. The total duration is approximately 19 minutes. It is scored for voice and piano, without specifying a particular voice type, although it is most commonly performed by a soprano or mezzo-soprano.

Structure of Seven Poems after Pushkin, Op. 29
| No. | Title | English title | Tempo marking | Text sources |
|---|---|---|---|---|
| I | Муза (Muza) | The Muse | Andante al rigore di tempo | Written and published in 1821 |
| II | Пѣвецъ (or Певец) (Pevets) | The Singer | Allegretto | "Певец", first published in 1816 |
| III | Стихи, сочинённые ночью во время бессонницы (Stikhi, sochinenniye noch'yu vo vremya bessonnitsy) | Lines Written During a Sleepless Night | Allegretto tenebroso | Untitled, published in 1830 |
| IV | Конь (Kon’) | The Horse | Allegro, sempre afrenatamente | Appears in Песни западных славян (Songs of the Western Slavs), published in 1834 |
| V | Элегия (Elegiya) | Gone Are My Heart's Desires | Allegro abbandonamente | Written in 1821, published in 1823 |
| VI | Роза (Roza) | The Rose | Andante | "Роза", originally published in 1815, revised in 1826 |
| VII | Заклинание (Zaklinaniye) | The Call | Andante tenebroso | "Заклинание", first published in 1830 |

== Recordings ==
Nikolai Medtner never recorded the complete set, and performers rarely record it in full, preferring instead to select individual pieces. Medtner recorded The Singer (No. 2) with soprano Oda Slobodskaya in 1947 for Melodiya. He returned to the set on November 16, 1950, recording The Muse (No. 1) and The Rose (No. 6) with soprano Elisabeth Schwarzkopf. The recording, originally released by Columbia Records and later reissued by EMI, Historic Recordings, and St-Laurent Studio, was made at Abbey Road Studio No. 3 in London. The following is a list of known complete recordings of the song cycle.

Recordings of Seven Poems after Pushkin, Op. 29
| Soprano | Piano | Date of recording | Place of recording | Label |
|---|---|---|---|---|
| Ekaterina Levental | Frank Peters | 2020 | Westvest90, Schiedam, The Netherlands | Brilliant Classics |

== Reception ==
Although the cycle is rarely performed in its entirety, several individual songs have achieved lasting popularity and were admired both by Nikolai Medtner's contemporaries and by later performers. An autograph manuscript of the first song, The Muse, was sold at auction by Sotheby's in New York on 6 December 1996. It included a handwritten inscription made by Medtner's widow, Anna Medtner, which read: "To dear Marietta—true friend of the Medtner family, with love Anna Medtner. 12 VIII 1956." The manuscript was estimated at £1,200–£1,500. It belonged to William Nicoll Cresswell's private art collection, and the purchaser, as well as the final hammer price, were not publicly disclosed.
