= Six Fairy Tales (Medtner) =

- by Nikolai Medtner
- Native name: Шесть сказок
- Opus: 51
- Year: 1928
- Published: 1929 - Leipzig
- Publisher: Wilhelm Zimmermann
- Duration: 18 minutes approximately
- Movements: 6
- Scoring: Piano

Six Fairy Tales, Op. 51 (Russian: Шесть сказок, translit. Shestʹ skazok) is a 1928 collection of pieces for solo piano by Russian composer Nikolai Medtner. It is one of the composer's last compositions for solo piano and his last collection of skazki.

== Background ==
The English translation of skazki is sometimes questioned, with some suggesting that terms such as “legends” or “folk tales” might be more accurate. However, “fairy tales” may well be suitable in this instance, particularly in light of the dedication to “Zolushka and Ivan the Fool,” both figures associated with the world of folklore and fairy tale.

The composition was completed in 1928 and published in 1929 in Leipzig by Wilhelm Zimmermann. It has been reprinted by Dover (1959 and 2001), Muzgiz (1960), and Zimmermann (2002). As the vast majority of Medtner's compositions, it was never formally premiered, but was primarily known and appreciated by other musicians and composers. Two different arrangements of No. 3 were published by Zimmermann in 1956: one for violin and piano, arranged by Trevor Williams, and another for viola and piano, arranged by Watson Forbes. Williams’s arrangement is currently out of print.

== Structure ==
This composition is divided into six pieces scored for solo piano. The pieces are written in the following keys: No. I in D minor, No. II in A minor (Dorian mode), No. III in A major, No. IV in F♯ minor, No. V in F♯ minor, and No. VI in G major. Each piece has its own character and mood, but together they form a unified collection typical of Medtner’s lyrical and expressive style. Even though the composer adhered a meaning to some of the pieces, it is not a programmatic work. It has an approximate duration of 18 minutes. The movement list is as follows:

1. Allegro molto vivace al rigore di tempo e sempre leggierissimo
2. Cantabile, tranquillo
3. Allegretto tranquillo e grazioso - Allegro (non troppo) al rigore di tempo - Tempo I
4. Allegretto con moto flessibile
5. Presto
6. Allegro vivace sempre a rigore di tempo

Unlike other skazka collections, these are meant to represent magical and fairy tale characters. In the program notes at a Medtner recital at Bryn Mawr College, in Pennsylvania, in 1930, the composer described some of the pieces as follows: "In the first tale the characters are introduced, the second is a song of Cinderella, the last a dance of the Fool."

== Recordings ==
The composer returned to this work several times over the years, although he never recorded the complete set. The earliest recordings made by Medtner were Nos. III and V, recorded in 1930 and later issued by Appian and St-Laurent. In 1931, he recorded No. II and made a new recording of No. III for Appian, also subsequently released by St-Laurent. Medtner’s third commercial recording again included Nos. II and III. Both were recorded at Abbey Road Studio No. 3 in London: No. II on April 22 and No. III on May 8, 1936. The recordings were first issued by HMV and were later reissued by Victor, Melodiya, Aprelevka, Riga, Appian, EMI Classics, ArkivMusic, St-Laurent, and Naxos, among others, on both vinyl and CD.

Medtner’s final return to the set came with the recording of No. I at Abbey Road Studio No. 3 on March 31, 1947. This recording was also first released by HMV and subsequently reissued as a historic recording by Melodiya, Aprelevka, Riga, Akkord, Appian, EMI Classics, ArkivMusic, St-Laurent, and Dante. The composer also made additional recordings that were later withdrawn or never published. He recorded No. IV for HMV in 1936 and No. V for Columbia in 1931 and again for HMV in 1947. No recording of No. IV by Medtner has ever been made publicly available, and consequently, there is no public authoritative version of it.

The following is a list of complete recordings of this composition:

Structure of Six Fairy Tales, Op. 51
Piano	Date of recording	Place of recording	Label
Geoffrey Tozer	1991/1992	St Jude on the Hill, Hampstead, London, UK	Chandos
Irina Mejoueva	October 1995	Akigawa Kirara Hall, Tokyo, Japan	Denon
Irina Mejoueva	May 2003	Shinkawa Bunka Hall, Uozu, Toyama, Japan	Wakabayashi Koubou
Hamish Milne	October 2006	Henry Wood Hall, London, UK	Hyperion
Frank Huang	December 2016	Souers Recital Hall, Miami University, Oxford, Ohio, USA	Centaur Records
Dina Parakhina	April 2022	Spencer Cozens Studios, Fulbeck, UK	Piano Classics
Vittorio Forte	September 2022	Studio Odradek "The Spheres", Montesilvano, Italy	Odradek Records

== Reception ==
Since Medtner was better known among musicians than among the general public, this set was generally well received by his peers. The Russian composer and close friend Sergei Rachmaninoff heard the pieces at a private performance and praised them, exclaiming that “no one tells such tales as Kolya [Medtner].”
