= Six Poems after Pushkin, Op. 36 (Medtner) =

Six Poems after Pushkin
- Song cycle by Nikolai Medtner
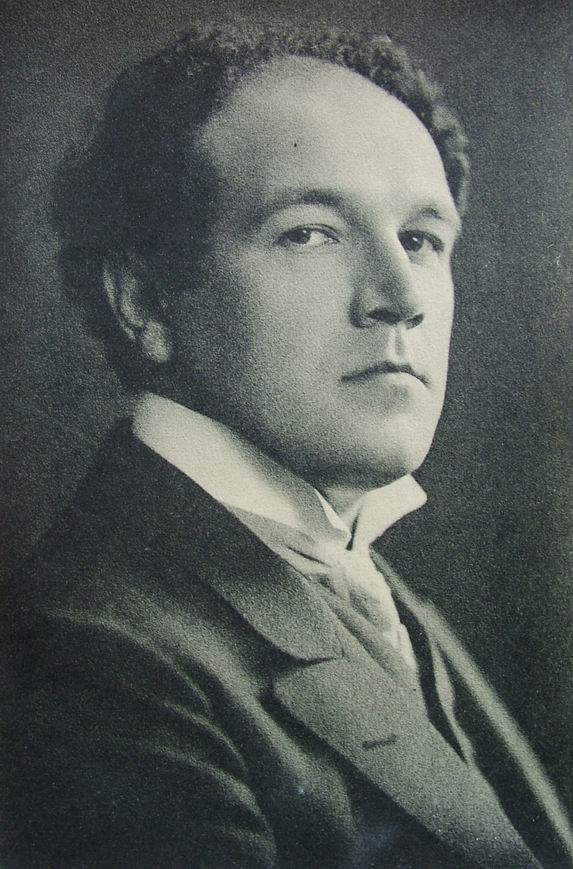
- Nikolai Medtner
- Native name: Шесть стихотворений A. Пушкина
- Opus: 36
- Text: Poems by Alexander Pushkin and Anton Delvig
- Published: 1919 - Moscow (or Petrograd)
- Publisher: Gosizdat
- Duration: 22 minutes approximately
- Movements: 6
- Scoring: High voice and piano

Six Poems after Pushkin, Op. 36 (Russian: Шесть стихотворений A. Пушкина, translit. Shest’ stikhotvoreniy A. Pushkina), is a 1919 song collection based on poems by Alexander Pushkin written by Russian composer Nikolai Medtner.

== Background ==
Medtner's Six Poems were composed around 1918 and 1919 and were published by Gosizdat, the Soviet government publishing body established after the 1917 revolution, in Moscow or Petrograd. An additional edition for markets outside Russia was published by Musikverlag Zimmermann in 1923. A collected works edition published by Muzgiz in Moscow in 1961 also included the set. The edition presented the texts in Russian with German translations. The translations were prepared by Friedrich Bodenstedt (Nos. I, II, and VI), W. Wischniak (No. III), Johannes von Guenther (No. IV), and Friedrich Fiedler (No. V).

When Roses Fade (No. III) was also arranged for solo piano by Boris Shatskes and posthumously published by Kompozitor in 1988.

== Structure ==
The set consists of six songs for high voice and piano. It has an approximate duration of 22 minutes. The list of pieces is as follows:

Structure of Six Poems after Pushkin, Op. 36
No.	Title	English title	Tempo marking	Text sources
I	Ангел (Angel)	The Angel	Con moto disinvolto ed espressivo	"Ангел", first published in 1827
II	Цветок (Tsvetok)	The Flower	Andante espressivo	First published in 1832
III	„Лишь розы увядают...“ ("Lish' rozy uvyadayut...")	When Roses Fade	Largo	"Лишь розы увядают", first published in 1825
IV	Испанский романс (Ispanskiy romans)	Spanish Romance	Allegro vivace e leggieramente	"Испанский романс", written in 1824, first published in 1827
V	Ночь (Noch’)	Night	Con moto	"Ночь", first published in 1823
VI	Арион (Arion)	Arion	Andante largamente	"Арион", written in 1827, first published in 1830

== Recordings ==
Nikolai Medtner never recorded the complete set, and performers rarely record it in full, preferring instead to select individual pieces. In 1947, Medtner made an unreleased recording of The Flower (No. II) with soprano Oda Slobodskaya for HMV. He returned to the cycle on November 16, 1950, recording When Roses Fade (No. III) with soprano Elisabeth Schwarzkopf. This recording was originally released on 78 rpm by Columbia Records and has since been reissued on CD by EMI, Archiv, Historic Recordings, and St-Laurent Studio. The following is a list of complete recordings of the cycle:

Recordings of Six Poems after Pushkin, Op. 36
Soprano	Piano	Date of recording	Place of recording	Label
Sofia Fomina	Alexander Karpeyev	March 2018	Wyastone Hall, Wyastone Leys, Monmouth, UK	Chandos
Ekaterina Levental	Frank Peters	2020	Westvest90, Schiedam, The Netherlands	Brilliant Classics
