= Two Poems after Pushkin and Bely (Medtner) =

1907 composition by Nikolai Medtner

- by Nikolai Medtner
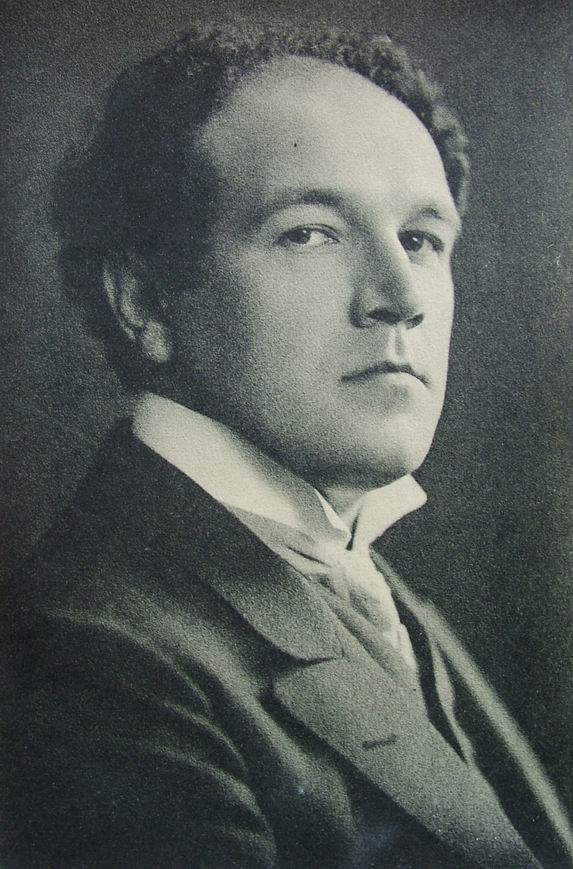
- Nikolai Medtner
- Native name: Два стихотворения
- Opus: 13
- Year: 1907
- Text: Alexander Pushkin (No. I); Andrei Bely (No. II)
- Language: Russian
- Dedication: Margarita Morozova (No. II)
- Published: 1908 (No. I); 1909 (No. II)
- Publisher: P. Jurgenson
- Duration: 6 minutes approximately
- Movements: 2
- Scoring: Voice and piano

Two Poems after Pushkin and Bely, Op. 13 (Russian: Два стихотворения, translit. Dva stikhotvoreniia), sometimes also shortened as Two Poems or Two Songs, is a short song cycle written by Russian composer Nikolai Medtner.

== Background ==
The Two Poems were composed in 1907 and, as many other small compositions by Medtner, never received a formal premiere, but were performed in private. The poems were initially published separately by P. Jurgenson in 1908 (No. I) and 1909 (No. II). Even though the first song bears no dedication, the second one is dedicated to "M. K. Morozova", a well-known Russian philanthropist and patron of the arts.

The first song, Winter Evening, sets music to the homonymous poem by Alexander Pushkin, first published in 1825. On the other hand, the second song, Epitaph, is a setting of a poem by Andrei Bely. The set was later republished by Classical Vocal Reprints beginning in 1959, and by Muzgiz in Moscow in 1961 as part of an urtext edition of the collected works. The adaptations were never translated into English, but they were translated into German by Johannes von Guenther (No. I) and an anonymous translator (No. II).

== Structure ==
The cycle consists of two pieces for medium or high voice with piano accompaniment. It has an approximate duration of 6 minutes. The movement list is as follows:

1. Зимний вечер (Winter Evening). = 84–100 – Più vivo e leggiero – Tempo I
2. Эпитафия (Epitaph). Andante con moto

Winter Evening is a piece in F minor and a stable. The melody soars above the accompanying piano, which plays very rapid arpeggios and scales. Epitaph, the final piece, is a much more calm chorale-like piece, in C major and 9/8.

== Recordings ==
Winter Evening is the better known of the two songs and has been recorded more than twenty times. Among these recordings is a notable performance by the soprano Tatiana Makushina, accompanied by Nikolai Medtner at the piano. This recording was made on September 4, 1947 at Abbey Road Studios (Studio No. 3). It was later released by EMI and subsequently reissued by ArkivMusic. Below is a list of complete recordings of the work:

Recordings of Two Poems after Pushkin and Bely, Op. 13
Soprano	Piano	Date of recording	Place of recording	Label
Lydia Chernykh	Lubov Orfenova	1990	—	Melodiya
Ekaterina Levental	Frank Peters	March 2019	Westvest90, Schiedam, The Netherlands	Brilliant Classics
