= Two Pieces, Op. 58 (Medtner) =

Two Pieces
- by Nikolai Medtner
- Opus: 58
- Year: 1940-1945
- Dedication: Edna Iles (Russian Round-Dance); Vitya Vronsky and Victor Babin (Knight Errant)
- Published: 1946
- Publisher: Augener
- Duration: 16 minutes approx.
- Movements: 2
- Scoring: Two pianos

Two Pieces or Two Pieces for Two Pianos, Op. 58 (Russian: Две пьесы для двух фортепиано), is a composition for two pianos by Russian pianist and composer Nikolai Medtner. Written between 1940 and 1945, it is one of Medtner's last compositions.

== Background ==
The composition was written at a time Medtner had decided to leave his native Russia towards the UK. The composer was writing his third piano concerto simultaneously, while living on the outskirts of Stratford-upon-Avon, in a small village called Wootton Wawen, in a period of time when World War II raids over the UK were taking place. A planned first public hearing of the first piece, Russian Round Dance, was scheduled to be performed on October 12, 1943, by the composer and Edna Iles. However, the piece had to be cancelled because two pianos were required and only one was available at the National Gallery recital. On that occasion, Medtner was accompanying Oda Slobodskaya in several of his songs.

The first public hearing of the set was broadcast on March 3, 1946, with pianist Arthur Alexander. and were published by Augener in London in 1946. The first piece, Russian Round-Dance (A Tale), was dedicated to Edna Iles (in an inscription on a printed copy of January 30, 1946, Medtner said of Iles she was "the bravest and ablest besieger of my musical fortresses"). The second piece, Knight Errant, was dedicated to the Russian-born duo Vitya Vronsky and Victor Babin. Despite the fact that the two pieces are in the same opus, it is common for performers and record companies to treat them separately.

Two Pieces was performed in the last public concert performed by the composer, in a recital given on June 2, 1946, at the Cambridge Theatre in London, with pianist Benno Moiseiwitsch. The order on this occasion was reversed, as Knight Errant was performed first, and Russian Round-Dance was played later. The two movements concluded the recital, effectively making the set the last piece ever performed in a concert by Medtner.

== Structure ==
Two Pieces is scored for two pianos and takes around seventeen minutes to perform. The movement list is as follows:

1. Русский хоровод (Сказка) (Russian Round-Dance [A Tale]). Allegro vivace (sempre al rigore di tempo) - L'istesso tempo, ma cantabile - Cantabile
2. Странствующий рыцарь (Knight Errant). Andante - Allegro risoluto (sempre al rigore di tempo) - Allegro risoluto

The first piece is in the key of E major. It is a ternary khorovod in 3/2. The second piece is in C minor, but presents many key changes throughout the piece. It is a large-scale piece, similar in depth to a sonata. Alexander Yau stated that Two Pieces is "deeply rooted in the traditions of Beethoven and Brahms," and his mature style is highly introspective, emotionally restrained and "highly individual [...] marked by dense counterpoint, long-spanning melodies, and philosophical seriousness."

== Recordings ==
The composer, together with Benno Moiseiwitsch, recorded the first movement of the set, Russian Round-Dance, in Abbey Road Studio No. 3, in London, UK. The recording took place on October 24, 1946, and was initially released by HMV, even though it has been re-released by many other record companies, such as EMI Classics, Naxos and Hyperion.

== Reception ==
Dedicatee Edna Iles was a fervent champion of the Round Dance, stating that Medtner played it with her while he was removed in Wootton Wawen: "Whenever he had visitors he wished me to play for them. The Round-Dance was invariably included, and no one could resist the charm of this work."
