= Seven Poems, Op. 46 (Medtner) =

Seven Poems
- Song cycle by Nikolai Medtner
- Native name: Семь стихотворений
- Opus: 46
- Year: 1924
- Text: Poems by Johann Wolfgang von Goethe, Joseph von Eichendorff and Adelbert von Chamisso
- Published: 1927
- Publisher: Zimmermann
- Duration: 17 minutes approximately
- Movements: 7
- Scoring: Voice and piano

Seven Poems, Op. 46 (Russian: Семь стихотворений, translit. Sem' stikhotvoreniy), is a song cycle composed by Russian composer Nikolai Medtner. It was written in 1924.

== Background ==
The Seven Songs were composed between 1922 and 1924, around the same time that Medtner was writing his Four Poems, Op. 45. It used texts by Johann Wolfgang von Goethe (Nos. I and II), Joseph von Eichendorff (Nos. III, IV, and V), and Adelbert von Chamisso (Nos. VI and VII). The composition was first published by Wilhelm Zimmermann in 1927, even though it is currently out of print. A collected works edition published by Muzgiz in Moscow in 1961 also included the set. The different editions presented the texts in German with Russian translations. The translations were prepared by Dmitri Nedovich (No. I), N. Vesnina (Nos. II, III, VI, and VII), L. Chudova (No. IV), and S. Severtsev (No. V). The work was never formally translated into English; however, Henry S. Drinker produced an English translation in 1946 that was never published with the score.

== Structure ==
The seven poems are scored for voice and piano accompaniment and have a total duration of 17 minutes approximately. The list of poems is as follows:

Structure of Seven Poems, Op. 46
| Piece No. | German title | Russian title | Title in English (Note: Translation into English provided by Henry S. Drinker in 1946.) | Tempo marking |
|---|---|---|---|---|
| I | Praeludium | Прелюдия Prelyudiya | Praeludium | Largamente |
| II | Geweihter Platz | Священное место Svyashchennoye mesto | The Hallowed Place | Allegretto |
| III | Serenade („Aussicht”) | Серенада („Надежда”) Serenada ("Nadezhda") | Serenade | Allegretto con dolcezza |
| IV | Im Walde | В лесу V lesu | In the Forest | Allegro risoluto |
| V | Winternacht | Зимняя ночь Zimnyaya noch' | Winter Night | Lento |
| VI | Die Quelle | Ручей Ruchey | The Spring | Allegretto (andantino) commodo |
| VII | Frisch gesungen | Песня Pesnya | Singing | Allegretto con moto, ma poco risoluto |

== Recordings ==
Nikolai Medtner never recorded the complete set, and performers rarely record it in full. Medtner recorded the cycle partially on October 16, 1950, where he performed "Praeludium" (No. I), "Winter Night" (No. V), and "The Spring" (No. 6) with soprano Elisabeth Schwarzkopf. This recording was originally released on 78 rpm by Columbia Records and has since been reissued on CD by EMI, Archiv, Historic Recordings, and St-Laurent Studio. The following is a list of complete recordings of the cycle:

Recordings of Seven Poems, Op. 46
| Soprano | Piano | Date of recording | Place of recording | Label |
|---|---|---|---|---|
| Sofia Fomina | Alexander Karpeyev | March 2018 | Wyastone Hall, Wyastone Leys, Monmouth, Gwent, UK | Chandos |
| Ekaterina Levental | Frank Peters | 2020 | Westvest90, Schiedam, The Netherlands | Brilliant Classics |
