= Twelve Songs after Goethe (Medtner) =

- Song cycle by Nikolai Medtner
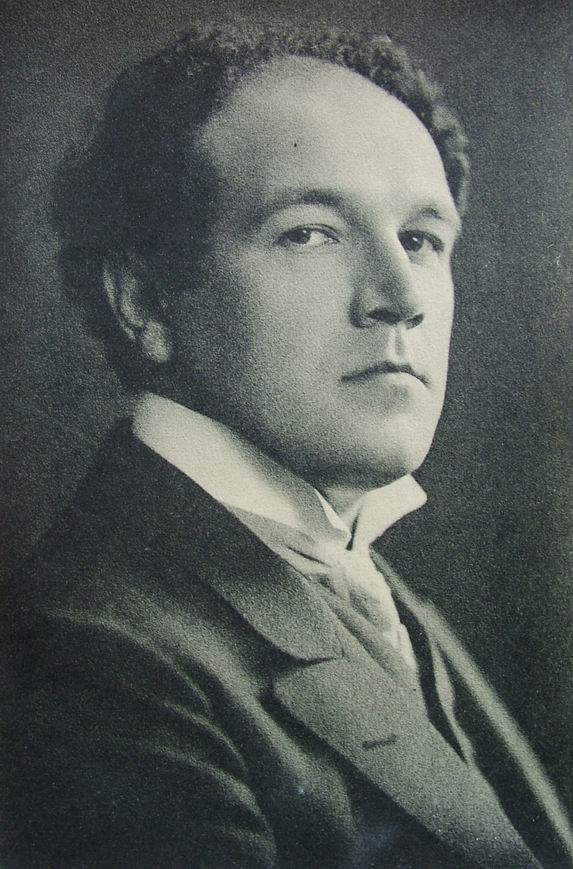
- Nikolai Medtner
- Native name: Двенадцать песен В. Гёте
- Opus: 15
- Text: Johann Wolfgang von Goethe
- Dedication: House of Song
- Published: 1909 - Moscow
- Publisher: P. Jurgenson
- Duration: 25 minutes approximately
- Movements: 12
- Scoring: Voice and piano

Twelve Songs after Goethe, Op. 15 (Russian: Двенадцать песен В. Гёте, translit. Dvenadtsat' pesen V. Gyote), is a song cycle composed by Russian composer Nikolai Medtner.

== Background ==
The Twelve Songs were composed after the publication of the previous set, Nine Songs after Goethe (1906). They were written between 1907 and 1909. At the time, Medtner was involved with the singer Maria Olenina-d'Alheim, who established the House of Song (Дом песни) in 1908. She and her husband, Pierre d'Alheim, envisioned the center as a means of promoting high-quality vocal art. Despite her general avoidance of contemporary Russian music, she felt an affinity with Medtner’s “spiritual attitude to song.” Medtner served as a programming adviser and also performed there as a soloist. This relationship culminated in the premiere of both Twelve Songs after Goethe, Op. 15 and Six Poems after Goethe, Op. 18, on January 21, 1909, at a House of Song concert in the Small Hall of the Moscow Conservatory. As a gesture of gratitude, this set was dedicated to the House of Song itself.

The composition was published by P. Jurgenson in 1909. It has since been republished by Classical Vocal Reprints. An urtext edition of the collected works was also published in 1961 by Muzgiz in Moscow. Both the original and reissued versions featured the original German text with Russian translations provided by Vladimir Vishnyak (Nos. I and II), Afanasy Fet (No. III), Anatoly Mashistov (Nos. IV, X, and XII), Mikhail Slonov (Nos. V, IX, and XI), and Yuri Aleksandrov (Nos. VI, VII, and VIII).

=== Text sources ===
“Wandrers Nachtlied I” (No. I) sets Goethe’s poem “Wandrers Nachtlied,” written in 1776 and first published in 1780 in the third volume of Johann Konrad Pfenninger’s journal Christliches Magazin. The poem had previously been set to music by Philipp Christoph Kayser. “An die Türen will ich schleichen…” (No. II) is based on the poem “Harfenspieler,” written in 1785 and first published in the third volume of Wilhelm Meisters Lehrjahre (1795). “Selbstbetrug” (No. III) sets a poem of the same name written in 1803 and published posthumously in Goethe’s Poetische und prosaische Werke (1836). “Sie liebt mich!…” (No. IV) draws on an untitled excerpt from the Singspiel Erwin und Elmire (1775), while the text of “So tanzet…” (No. V) also appears in Goethe’s Singspiel Lila (1778). “Vor Gericht” (No. VI) was first published in 1776.

"Meeresstille” (No. VII) sets Goethe’s poem of the same title, first published in 1795 in Friedrich Schiller’s Musenalmanach für das Jahr 1796, a literary yearbook; in the second edition of 1800 the title appeared as “Meeres Stille.” The following song, “Glückliche Fahrt” (No. VIII), is based on the poem of the same title, conceived together with the previous one and likewise published in Schiller’s almanac. “Nähe des Geliebten” (No. IX) sets a poem of the same name written and first published in 1795. “Der ungetreue Knabe” (No. X) draws on a text from the Singspiel Claudine von Villa Bella (1775). “Gleich und Gleich” (No. XI) likewise takes its title from the original poem, written around 1814. Finally, “Geistergruß” (No. XII) is based on the poem “Geistes-Gruß,” written in 1774 and first published in 1789.

== Structure ==
Twelve Songs after Goethe consists of seven pieces scored for a medium-high voice with piano accompaniment. With a total duration of 18 minutes approximately, each song lasts for around two minutes. The list of songs is as follows:

Structure of Twelve Songs after Goethe, Op. 15
No.	German title	Russian title	Title in English (Note: Translation into English provided by Henry S. Drinker in 1946.)	Tempo marking	Key
I	Wandrers Nachlied I	Ночная песнь странника I Nochnaya pesn' strannika I	Wanderer's Night-Song	Largo	F major
II	Aus „Wilhelm Meister“ („An die Türen will ich schleichen...“)	Из „Вильгельма Мейстера“ („Тихо постою у входа...“); Iz „Vil'gel'ma Meystera“ („Tikho postoyu u vkhoda...“)	The Beggar	Andantino con moto	F minor
III	Selbstbetrug	Самообольщение; Samoobol'shcheniye	Self-Deceit	Allegretto con moto	D minor
IV	Aus „Erwin und Elmire“ („Sie liebt mich!..“)	Из „Эрвина и Эльмиры“ („Любим я!..“); Iz „Ervina i El'miry“ („Lyubim ya!..“)	She Loves Me!	Con moto appassionato. Leidenschaftlich bewegt	A♭ major
V	Aus „Lila“ („So tanzet...“)	Из „Лили“ („Ах, игры и танцы...“); Iz „Lili“ („Akh, igry i tantsy...“)	So Dance Ye	Allegretto giocoso	C major
VI	Vor Gericht (Ballade)	Перед судом (Баллада); Pered sudom (Ballada)	Before the Court	Moderato. Severo	C minor
VII	Meeresstille	Тишь на море Tish' na more	Sea Calm	Andante lugubre	F♯ minor
VIII	Glückliche Fahrt	Счастливое плаванье Schastlivoye plavan'ye	Happy Voyage	Andante, stentato	♯ major
IX	Nähe des Geliebten	Близость милого Blizost' milogo	Near the Beloved	Largamente, con passione	E♭ major
X	Der untreue Knabe (Ballade)	Неверный юноша (Баллада); Nevernyy yunosha (Ballada)	The Faithless Lad	Allegro	F minor
XI	Gleich und Gleich	Друг для друга Drug dlya druga	Like to Like	Allegro abbandonamente	D♭ major
XII	Geistergruß	Приветствие духа Privetstviye dukha	The Spirit's Greeting	Allegro molto sostenuto	B♭ minor

== Recordings ==
The composer never recorded the work in its entirety; however, like many performers both in his time and today, he recorded excerpts from it. He recorded “Selbstbetrug” (No. 3), “Aus Lila (“So tanzet…”)” (No. 5), “Meeresstille” (No. 7), and “Glückliche Fahrt” (No. 8) with the soprano Elisabeth Schwarzkopf. The recordings were made at Abbey Road Studio No. 3 on November 22, 1950 (except for No. 5, which was recorded on October 19 that year) and were released by Columbia, with later reissues by EMI Classics, ArkivMusic, Historic Recordings, and St-Laurent.

The following is a list of complete recordings of the work:

Recordings of Twelve Songs after Goethe, Op. 15
Soprano	Piano	Date of recording	Place of recording	Label
Rachel Joselson	Sasha Burdin	2017	Concert Hall, Voxman Music Building, University of Iowa School of Music, USA	Albany Records
Ekaterina Levental	Frank Peters	April 2022	Westvest90, Schiedam, The Netherlands	Brilliant Classics
