= Six Poems after Pushkin, Op. 32 (Medtner) =

Six Poems after Pushkin
- Song collection by Nikolai Medtner
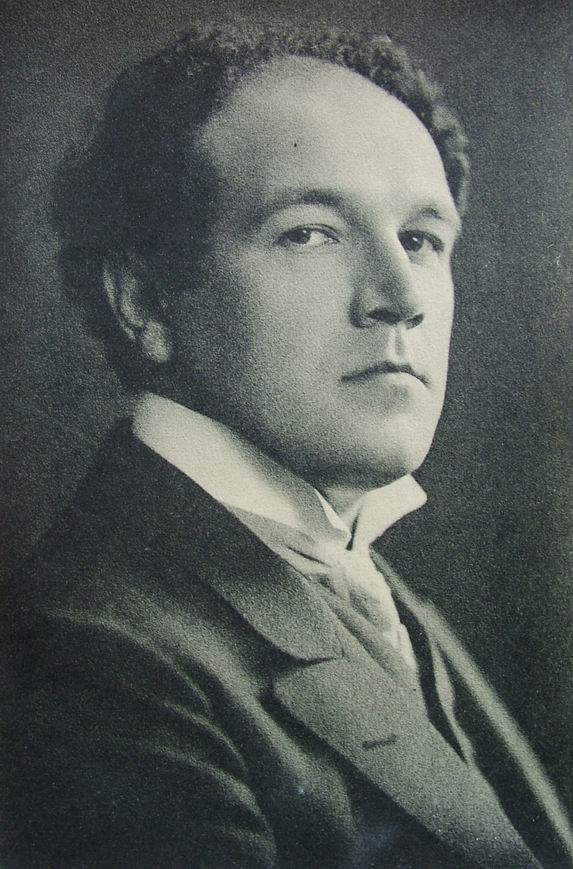
- Nikolai Medtner
- Native name: Шесть стихотворений A. Пушкина
- Opus: 32
- Text: Poems by Alexander Pushkin and Anton Delvig
- Language: Russian
- Published: 1916 - Moscow
- Publisher: Russian Music Publishing
- Duration: 23 minutes approximately
- Movements: 6
- Scoring: Voice and piano

Six Poems after Pushkin, Op. 32 (Russian: Шесть стихотворений A. Пушкина, translit. Shest’ stikhotvoreniy A. Pushkina), is a 1915 song collection based on poems by Alexander Pushkin written by Russian composer Nikolai Medtner.

== Background ==
Six Poems was composed in 1915 and first published in 1916 in Moscow by Russian Music Publishing. The cycle sets texts primarily by Alexander Pushkin (Nos. I–IV and VI), while No. V is based on a poem by Anton Delvig.

== Structure ==
The set consists of six songs for voice and piano. It has an approximate duration of 22 minutes. The list of pieces is as follows:

Structure of Six Poems after Pushkin, Op. 32
| No. | Title | English title | Tempo marking | Text sources |
|---|---|---|---|---|
| I | Эхо (Ekho) | Echo | Largamente (ma con moto) | — |
| II | Воспоминание (Vospominaniye) | Remembrance | = 52-72 | "Воспоминание", written in 1828 |
| III | Похоронная песня (Pokhoronnaya pesnya) | Funeral Song | Mesto - Poco più mosso e risoluto | — |
| IV | Я вас любил (Ya vas lyubil) | I Loved Thee Well | Languido | Untitled, written in 1829, published in 1830 |
| V | "Могу ль забыть то сладкое мгновенье..." (Вальс) (“Mogu l’ zabyt’ to sladkoye mgnoven’ye…” [Val’s]) | The Waltz | Presto - Meno mosso - Presto. Tempo I | — |
| VI | Мечтателю (Mechtatelyu) | To a Dreamer | Largamente | — |

== Recordings ==
Nikolai Medtner never recorded the complete song cycle, and performers rarely present it in full. It is common for recording companies to record individual pieces. Medtner recorded To a Dreamer (No. VI) with soprano Oda Slobodskaya on September 6, 1947, at Abbey Road Studio No. 3, London, for HMV, later issued on LP by Melodiya and subsequently reissued on CD by EMI, ArkivMusic, St‑Laurent, and Dante.

He returned to the set on November 16, 1950 to record The Waltz (No. 5) with soprano Elisabeth Schwarzkopf for Columbia Records (78 rpm). These recordings, originally taken at Abbey Road Studio No. 3, London, were later reissued by EMI, ArkivMusic, Historic Recordings, and St‑Laurent.

The following is a list of known complete recordings of the song cycle:

Recordings of Six Poems after Pushkin, Op. 32
| Soprano | Piano | Date of recording | Place of recording | Label |
|---|---|---|---|---|
| Ekaterina Levental | Frank Peters | March 2020 | Westvest90, Schiedam, The Netherlands | Brilliant Classics |
