= Seven Poems, Op. 28 (Medtner) =

Seven Poems after Fet, Bryusov, and Tyutchev
- by Nikolai Medtner
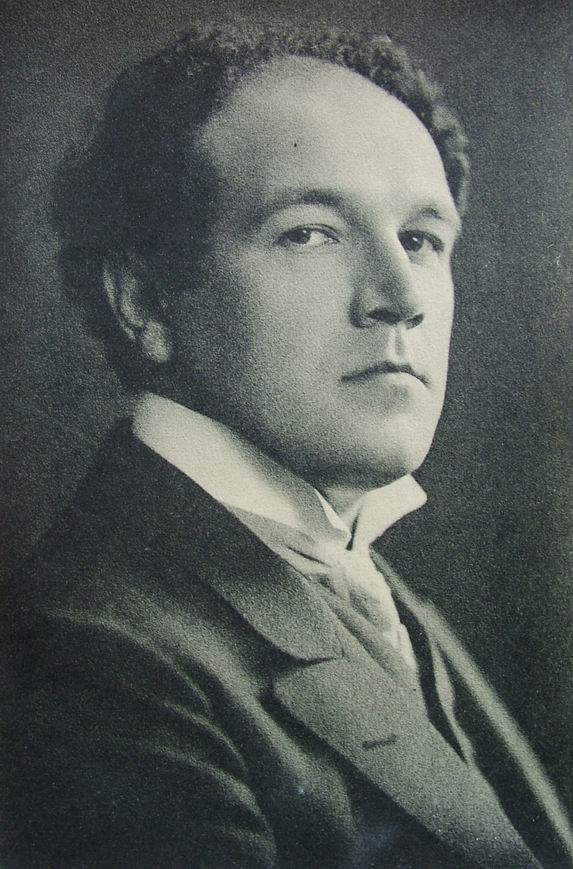
- Medtner, at the time of the composition
- Native name: Семь стихотворений Фета, Брюсова, Тютчева
- Opus: 28
- Language: Russian (also translated to German for publication)
- Composed: 1913
- Published: 1915 - Paris
- Publisher: Édition Russe de Musique
- Duration: 20 minutes approximately
- Movements: 7
- Scoring: Voice and piano

Seven Poems or Seven Poems after Fet, Bryusov, and Tyutchev, Op. 28 (Russian: Семь стихотворений Фета, Брюсова, Тютчева, translit. Sem’ stikhotvoreniy Feta, Bryusova, Tyutcheva), is a collection of songs by Russian composer Nikolai Medtner. It was finished in 1913

== Background ==
The seven poems included in this cycle set poems by Afanasy Fet (Nos. I, II, and III), Valery Bryusov (No. IV), Ludwig Uhland (No. V), and Fyodor Tyutchev (Nos. VI, and VII). The original poem by Uhland was translated into Russian by Tyutchev, also adapting its meter. They were composed in 1913 and published in 1915 in Paris by Édition Russe de Musique. It is nowadays sold by Classical Vocal Reprints, who has continuously reprinted the set since 1959. The final printed edition published in 1915 included texts in Russian with German translations provided by Friedrich Fiedler (No. II) and W. Wischniak (all the other numbers). A collected vocal works edition published by Muzgiz in Moscow in 1961 also shows these translations. Apart from Henry S. Drinker’s complete English translations of Medtner’s songs (issued separately without the musical scores), the songs have never been published in English in a score edition.

== Structure ==
Seven Poems has an approximate duration of 20 minutes. It is scored for solo voice, especially a soprano or a mezzo-soprano, with piano accompaniment. The following is an overview of the structure of the poem cycle. In the table below, the English titles are approximate translations provided by various sources in regular type, followed by the titles from Drinker’s 1946 translation in smaller type.

Structure of Seven Poems after Fet, Bryusov, and Tyutchev, Op. 28
No.	Title	English title	Tempo marking	Text source
I	Нежданный дождь (Nezhdannyy dozhdʹ)	Unexpected Rain (Prayer for Rain)	Allegretto abbandonamente	—
II	Не могу я слышать этой птички (Ne mogu ya slyshat’ etoy ptichki)	Serenade / I Can't Listen to this Birdsong	Sempre abbandonamente, quasi serenata	"Не могу я слышать этой птички", first published in 1892
III	Бабочка (Babochka)	The Butterfly	Allegro leggierissimo	"Бабочка", first published in 1884
IV	Тяжела, бесцветна и пуста (Tyazhela, bestsvetna i pusta)	Heavy Is the Gravestone / Heavy, Dark, and Faded (In the Church-Yard)	Andante con pianto	"Тяжела, бесцветна и пуста", first published in 1911
V	Весеннее успокоение (Vesennee uspokoenie)	Spring Solace / Peace in Springtime (Elegy)	Andante frescamente	"Frühlingsberuhigung", written in 1913 and published in Uhland's Lieder ("Frühlingslieder", No. 3), then translated by Tyutchev and published in 1832 under the title "Весеннее успокоение"
VI	Сижу задумчив и один (Sizhu zadumchiv i odin)	Absorbed and Alone / I Sit Deep in Thought and Alone (Dejection)	Andante, meditativo	"Сижу задумчив и один", first published in 1836
VII	Пошли, господь, свою отраду (Poshli, Gospodʹ, svoyu otradu)	Send Thy Comfort / Lord, Send Thy Comfort (The Pauper)	Pesante	"Пошли, господь, свою отраду", first published in 1850

== Recordings ==
Seven Poems has rarely received complete recordings, and the composer did not even record his own complete work. The earliest of these recordings is No. III (The Butterfly), recorded in 1931 with the soprano Tatiana Makushina for St-Laurent Studio. Medtner returned to this repertoire in 1947, again recording No. 3 with Makushina, initially released by HMV, and in the same year set down two more songs with the soprano Oda Slobodskaya: No. 2 (Serenade), released by HMV, and No. 5 (Spring Solace), released by Melodiya. These later recordings were originally issued on HMV 78 rpm discs and subsequently reissued on LP and CD, notably by EMI and specialist historical labels.
