= Nine Songs after Goethe (Medtner) =

1906 song cycle by Nikolai Medtner

- Song cycle by Nikolai Medtner
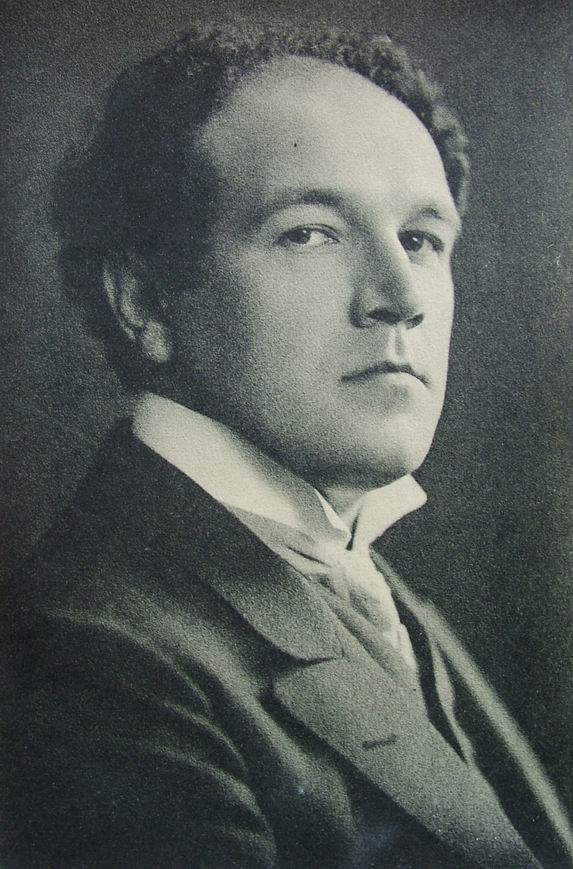
- The composer
- Native name: Девять пѣсенъ Гёте для голоса и фортепіано
- Opus: 6
- Year: 1906
- Text: Johann Wolfgang von Goethe
- Language: German
- Dedication: To Emil and Anna Medtner
- Published: 1906, Moscow
- Publisher: P. Jurgenson
- Duration: 18 minutes approximately
- Movements: 9
- Scoring: Voice and piano

Nine Songs after Goethe, Op. 6 (Russian: Девять пѣсенъ Гёте для голоса и фортепіано, translit. Devyat' pesen Goethe dlya golosa i fortepiano), is a song cycle that set poems by Goethe written by Russian composer Nikolai Medtner. Completed in 1906, it is the earliest song cycle to feature texts exclusively by Goethe.

== Background ==
The composition was probably composed around the autumn of 1905, while visiting Nizhny with his family. It was approved by the censoring board of Imperial Russia on March 3, 1906 (N. S.). It was published the same year in Moscow by P. Jurgenson, in an edition in the original German that included Russian translations by various authors: Yuri Aleksandrov (Nos. I, IV, VI, VII, and IX), Vladimir Vishnyak (Nos. I, II, III, and VIII), and Lev Conus (No. V). An urtext collected edition appeared in 1961, published by Muzgiz in Moscow. This edition introduced numerous changes and alterations to the piano accompaniment and vocal parts of several songs in the set.

The composition was premiered on November 7, 1906, even though information on the premiere is scarce. The set was dedicated in its entirety to Emil and Anna Medtner. Emil, Nikolai's eldest brother, was a philosopher and music critic who was then married to Anna Medtner, a talented violinist. Nikolai, who was in love with Anna at the time of the composition and had confessed the situation to Emil, married her thirteen years later, in 1919; the marriage lasted until his death in 1951.

=== Text sources ===
All the poems featured in this composition were written by Johann Wolfgang von Goethe, and the texts were not laid out in any particular order within the composition. "Wandrers Nachtlied" (No. I) sets Goethe's "Ein Gleiches", a poem written in 1780 and first published in 1815. "Mailied" (No. II) was presumably written around 1812. "Elfenliedchen" (No. III) is based on an untitled poem found in Briefe an Charlotte von Stein ("Letters to Charlotte von Stein"), a collection of correspondence between Goethe and Charlotte von Stein that was published many years after the writer's death. "Im Vorübergehn" (No. IV) is based on a poem of the same name published in Goethe's Werke, Band III (1828). The text of "Aus Claudine von Villa Bella" (No. V) was taken from an untitled passage commonly known as "Lied des Rugantino" from Goethe's play Claudine von Villa Bella (1776). "Aus Erwin und Elmire I (Inneres Wühlen)" (No. VI) and "Aus Erwin und Elmire II (Sieh mich, Heil'ger)" (No. VII) are untitled fragments taken from Erwin und Elmire (1776), an opera for which Goethe wrote the libretto. The two poems were first published outside of the opera in Goethe's Werke nach den vorzüglichsten Quellen revidirte Ausgabe (1868), a scholarly edition of Goethe's works published many years after the author's death. "Erster Verlust" (No. VIII) is adapted from a poem of the same name first published in 1789, and "Gefunden" (No. IX) was written in 1813.

== Structure ==
Nine Songs after Goethe consists of seven pieces scored for a medium-high voice with piano accompaniment. With a total duration of 18 minutes approximately, each song lasts for around two minutes. The list of songs is as follows:

Structure of Nine Songs after Goethe, Op. 6
No.	German title	Russian title	Title in English (Note: Translation into English provided by Henry S. Drinker in 1946.)	Tempo marking
I	Wandrers Nachtlied	Ночная пѣснь странника Nochnaya pesn' strannika	Wanderer's Night-Song	Lento
II	Mailied	Майская пѣснь Mayskaya pesn'	Spring Song	Allegretto frescamento
III	Elfenliedchen	Пѣсенка Эльфовъ; Pesenka El'fov	Song of the Elves	Allegretto
IV	Im Vorübergehn	Мимоходомъ; Mimokhodom	I Roamed the Meadows	Tempo di passo leggiero
V	Aus Claudine von Villa Bella	Пѣсня изъ Клаудины; Pesnya iz Klaudiny	Loveliest Lass	Andantino
VI	Aus Erwin und Elmire I (Inneres Wühlen)	Изъ Эрвина и Эльмиры I Iz Ervina i El'miry I	Conscience	Andantino con moto interioro
VII	Aus Erwin und Elmire II (Sieh mich, Heil'ger)	Изъ Эрвина и Эльмиры II; Iz Ervina i El'miry II	Hear Me, Lord	Andantino con pianto
VIII	Erster Verlust	Первая утрата Pervaya utrata	First Love	Allegretto sognaremento (or sognando)
IX	Gefunden (Epithalamion)	Эпиталама; Epitalama	Rooted Firm (Epithalamion)	Tempo di passo tranquillo

== Recordings ==
The composer never recorded a complete performance of the entire work, but, like most performers both then and now, he recorded excerpts from it throughout his life. The first time he recorded music from this work was in 1931, when Tatiana Makushina, with the composer himself at the piano, recorded "Elfenliedchen" (No. III) for St-Laurent. Medtner returned to the work on November 22, 1950, when he recorded "Elfenliedchen" (No. III) again, as well as "Im Vorübergehn" (No. IV), with soprano Elisabeth Schwarzkopf. The recording, which took place at Abbey Road Studio No. 3 in London, was released by Columbia and later reissued by EMI Classics, ArkivMusic, Historic Recordings, and St-Laurent.

The following is a list of complete recordings of the work:

Recordings of Nine Songs after Goethe, Op. 6
Soprano	Piano	Date of recording	Place of recording	Label
Susan Gritton	Geoffrey Tozer	2003	Potton Hall, Dunwich, Suffolk, UK	Chandos
Ekaterina Levental	Frank Peters	April 2022	Westvest90, Schiedam, The Netherlands	Brilliant Classics

== Notes and references ==
=== Sources ===
- Medtner, Nikolai (1906). Nine Songs after Goethe, Op. 6: Scores at the International Music Score Library Project. 1st ed. Mosow: P. Jurgenson (in German and Russian)
