= Four Poems, Op. 45 (Medtner) =

Four Poems
- by Nikolai Medtner
- Native name: Четыре стихотворения
- Opus: 45
- Year: 1924
- Text: Alexander Pushkin (Nos. I & II); Fyodor Tyutchev (Nos. III & IV)
- Language: Russian
- Published: 1926
- Publisher: Zimmermann
- Duration: 14 minutes approximately
- Movements: 4
- Scoring: Voice and piano

Four Poems, Op. 45 (Russian: Четыре стихотворения, translit. Chetyre stikhotvoreniya), is a short song cycle by Russian composer Nikolai Medtner. It was finished in 1924.

== Background ==
Medtner's Four Poems was composed in 1924 for high voice and piano. They were setting to music of poems by two famous Russian poets and writers: Alexander Pushkin and Fyodor Tyutchev. The first piece, entitled Elegy, is an adaptation of an untitled poem by Pushkin first published in 1822. The second piece is an adaptation of a poem of the same title, Телега жизни ("The Coach of Life" or "The Wagon of Life"), also by Pushkin, written in 1823. The remaining two pieces are setting of poems by Tyutchev.

The work was first published in 1926 by Wilhelm Zimmermann, and this edition was later reissued in 1993. No. IV from the set was also published separately by Kompozitor in 2004 as part of a collection entitled Forgotten Pages of Russian Romance. An urtext collected works edition was prepared by Aleksandr Goldenweiser and published in Moscow by Muzgiz in 1961. Although the songs were originally adapted from the original Russian poems, they were translated into German by Oskar von Riesemann and published in the 1961 urtext edition. A translation into English by Henry S. Drinker was published separately without the score in 1946.

== Structure ==
The composition is a song cycle made up of four songs. It is scored for voice and piano accompaniment, with a total duration of around 14 minutes. The list of poems is as follows:

Structure of Four Poems, Op. 45
Piece No.	Russian title	Title in English (Note: Translation into English provided by Henry S. Drinker in 1946.)	Tempo marking
I	Элегия („Люблю ваш сумрак неизвестный...") Elegya ("Lyublyu vash sumrak neizvestnyy...")	Elegy	Largamente
II	Телега жизни Telega zhizni	The Coach of Life	Allegro risoluto
III	Песнь ночи („Как океан объемлет шар земной...") Pesn' nochi ("Kak okean ob"yemlet shar zemnoy...")	Song of Night	Largamente
IV	Наш век Nash vek	Our Time	Sostenuto

== Recordings ==
During his life, Medtner only made two recordings of piece No. II. The first time was in 1931 when he performed with soprano Tatiana Makushina. This version was later put out on a vinyl record by the St-Laurent label. The composer recorded the piece again many years later, on September 19, 1947. This second session took place at Abbey Road Studio No. 3 in London with soprano Oda Slobodskaya. This 1947 performance was eventually released by EMI, ArkivMusic, and St-Laurent. The following is a list of complete recordings of the work:

Recordings of Four Poems, Op. 45
Soprano	Piano	Date of recording	Place of recording	Label
Lydia Chernykh	Lubov Orfenova	1990	—	Melodiya
Sofia Fomina	Alexander Karpeyev	March 2018	Wyastone Hall, Wyastone Leys, Monmouth, UK	Chandos
Ekaterina Levental	Frank Peters	March 2019	Westvest90, Schiedam, The Netherlands	Brilliant Classics
