= Piano Concerto No. 3 (Medtner) =

1944 piano concerto by Nikolai Medtner

- Ballade
- Piano concerto by Nikolai Medtner
- Key: E minor
- Opus: 60
- Period: Modernist-contemporary
- Composed: 1940–1943
- Dedication: Jayachamaraja Wadiyar, the Maharaja of Mysore
- Duration: about 36 minutes
- Movements: One (divided into three sub-movements)

Premiere
- Date: 19 February 1944
- Location: Royal Albert Hall, London
- Conductor: Adrian Boult

The Piano Concerto No. 3 in E minor, "Ballade", Op. 60, is one of Nikolai Medtner's last major compositions, completed in 1943, when he was 63. It was commissioned by the pianist Benno Moiseiwitsch, who had been an early champion of Medtner.

== History ==
=== Composition ===
Medtner and his wife Anna were living in London when The Blitz began in earnest in September 1940. His devoted champion, the English pianist Edna Iles, had moved to her parents' home in the Birmingham suburb of Moseley, and the Medtners came to stay there too. After the house was bombed, they moved with the Ileses to the Worcestershire village of Wythall. Later they moved to a secluded house near Wootton Wawen, not far from Stratford-upon-Avon in Warwickshire. It was in this succession of rural surroundings that the Third Concerto was finished.

One day, Medtner gave Edna Iles the manuscript of the first movement, telling her he had never before revealed a part of a work before it was complete. The two practised the work on two pianos, and when it was complete, he presented her with the entire score.

Medtner said in private that the concerto's first movement was inspired by Mikhail Lermontov's ballad Rusalka, about a water-nymph whose seductive advances fail to arouse a sleeping knight. He extended Lermontov's poem for the remaining movements: the knight (personifying the human spirit) awakens and sings a song that turns into a hymn, symbolizing his triumph over temptation and his achievement of redemption and eternal life.

The Medtners returned to London in April 1943.

=== Premiere ===
The premiere of the Third Concerto took place in the Royal Albert Hall on 19 February 1944, with Adrian Boult conducting, and Medtner himself at the piano. Medtner dedicated the Third Concerto to Jayachamaraja Wadiyar, the Maharaja of Mysore, who had supported him and founded the Medtner Society at Philharmonia Concert Society. The dedication was inscribed, "with deep gratitude for the appreciation and furtherance of my work". He devoted the recording of all his major works to the maharaja while himself playing the piano parts.

He continued to make recordings until his health failed two years before his 1951 death, but 1944 was the last year in which he performed in public, and this occasion was one of his last appearances.

After his death, in 1951, Anne offered the Ukrainian pianist Dmitry Paperno, who was aged only 22, an opportunity to give the Russian premiere of the Third Concerto, but turned it down. The Third Concerto was later played in a tribute concert conducted by Anatole Fistoulari, at Anna's request; Colin Horsley, the New Zealand-born pianist, who also posthumously premiered the Piano Quintet, was the soloist.

== Form ==
The work is sub-titled "Ballade", and is constructed as one movement divided into three sub-movements, although the central interludium is very short, lasting less than two minutes. The whole work lasts about 36 minutes, and the movements are all connected.

1. Con moto largamento – Allegretto con moto (16 minutes)
2. Interludium. Allegro, molto sostenuto, misterioso (al rigore di tempo) (2 minutes)
3. Finale. Allegro molto. Svegliando, eroico – Andante con moto tranquillo – Allegro molto – Coda: Maestoso, ma appassionato (19 minutes)

According to an analysis of the piece published by the University of Iowa, the first movement is in variation form and has 4 themes and a "horn motif" that acts as a ritornello. However, other analyses, including one written in 1948 for the Medtner Society, have concluded that it actually has 3 themes; the 3rd and 4th themes are very similar. Throughout the first movement, Medtner introduces the 4 themes and creates variations on the themes, in a seemingly haphazard order. The second movement, according to the analysis, is mostly in binary form, but it does not repeat the B section. In the second movement, the piano part is in 2/4 while the orchestra part is in 3/4. The second movement uses 3 themes from the first movement and introduces a new theme. The third movement may either be in sonata-allegro or ABA form, and the author of the study published by the University of Iowa believes that it is in sonata form. The 3rd movement uses the first theme of the 2nd movement and introduces 1 new theme in the exposition. The development section introduces 4 new themes, 3 of which are derived from earlier themes not in the 3rd movement.

Medtner was never happy writing for the orchestra; he found it difficult and tedious, and his three concertos are the only three of his over 60 published works that involved the orchestra at all. The scoring of the Third Concerto is for solo piano, 2 flutes, 2 oboes, 2 clarinets, 2 bassoons, 4 horns, 2 trumpets, 3 trombones, tuba, timpani, and strings.

== Recordings ==
There have been nine recordings of the work to date, starting with the composer's own in 1947:

- Medtner, with the Philharmonia Orchestra under Issay Dobrowen (1947 HMV DB6718/22 Melodiya D 06501/2, M10-41173 Testament SBT1027, St-Laurent YSL 78-006, Dante HPC126 – nla)
- Tatiana Nikolayeva, with the Moscow Radio Symphony Orchestra under Yevgeny Svetlanov (c.1961 Melodiya C 0229/30, D 09321/2)
- Michael Ponti, with the Orchestra of Radio Luxembourg under Pierre Cao (RO 1973 Vox/Candide CE31092 Vox CDX5068, Brilliant Classics 9021 20cds, Vox Turnabout 115714-2 – nla)
- Geoffrey Douglas Madge, with the Artur Rubinstein State Philharmonic Orchestra under Stupel (1991 BIS BISCD1258, Danacord DACOCD403 – nla)
- Geoffrey Tozer, with the London Philharmonic Orchestra under Neeme Järvi (1991 Chandos CHAN9038, CHAN9040 2cds)
- Nikolai Demidenko, with the BBC Scottish Symphony Orchestra under Jerzy Maksymiuk (1991 Hyperion CDA6658021)
- Konstantin Scherbakov, with the Moscow Symphony Orchestra under Ziva (1996 Naxos 8553359)
- Yevgeny Sudbin with the Bergen Philharmonic Orchestra under Andrew Litton (2014, BIS-2088 SACD)
- Severin von Eckardstein with the Poznań Philharmonic Orchestra under Łukasz Borowicz (2026, CC 720073)
