= Violin Sonata No. 3 (Medtner) =

Composition for violin and piano by Nikolai Medtner

The Violin Sonata No. 3 in E minor, Op. 57, given the name Epica, is a four-movement work for violin and piano, written by Nikolai Medtner from 1935 to 1938. The piece was dedicated to his late brother Emil Medtner.

When in Paris in 1935, Medtner started work on writing a violin sonata, but failed to make significant progress. It was only over two years later, after having completed his Sonata-Idyll, that he returned to work on it: throughout 1938 he worked on the piece, completing it in October of that year.

== Structure ==
The sonata is written in four movements, beginning and ending in the key of E minor. It employs cyclic form. The entire work takes approximately 45 minutes to perform. The movements are:

1. Introduzione: Andante meditamente – Allegro (E minor)
2. Scherzo: Allegro molto vivace e leggiero (A minor)
3. Andante con moto (F minor)
4. Finale: Allegro molto (E minor)

The first movement begins with a slow 6/8 introduction which leads into a long sonata form in 6/4 time.

The second movement, in common time, opens with a vigorous main theme, which prominently features rhythmic dance-like features. This is followed by a graceful and melodic second theme, which greatly contrasts the first, before, after a short transition section, both themes are repeated, and the movement ends in an energetic coda.

The work's slow movement, in 3/4 time, opens with a series of longing chords in the piano, which give way to a melodic section in the Aeolian mode. This is followed by a second theme, in B major, before the two themes come together in the movement's lyrical finish.

The sonata's last movement, fast in tempo and in 3/4 time, continues on from the end of the third movement without a pause. It begins with an assertive first theme in G major, which is contrasted by a more melodic second theme in D major. At the end of the exposition of the two main themes, there appears, for a short moment, a fragment of the church chant Christ is risen, which undergoes 11 variations in place of a conventional sonata development, before the movement ends with a recapitulation of the first theme and a coda.
