= Hamish Milne =

English pianist (1939–2020)

- Born: 27 April 1939; Salisbury, England
- Died: 12 February 2020 (aged 80)
- Occupations: Professor, pianist
- Instrument: Piano

Hamish Milne (27 April 1939 – 12 February 2020) was an English pianist known for his advocacy of Nikolai Medtner.

Milne studied at Bishop Wordsworth's School in Salisbury and then with Harold Craxton at the Royal Academy of Music in London, where he taught, and later in Rome, Italy under Guido Agosti.

He made his London recital debut in 1963, and gave his first performance at the BBC Proms in 1978. In the 1970s, Milne was the first pianist to offer a comprehensive survey of the piano music of Medtner since the composer made his own records.

He died on 12 February 2020, at the age of 80.
