= Edna Iles =

English pianist (1905–2003)

Edna Amy Iles (18 May 1905 – 29 January 2003) was an English classical pianist.

Edna Iles was born in Kings Heath, Birmingham in 1905. She began her studies in Birmingham with Appleby Matthews, making her debut as soloist with the City of Birmingham Orchestra at age 15 in the Liszt E-flat Concerto. She made her Wigmore Hall recital debut soon afterwards and established a prominent presence throughout Britain and continental Europe during the 1920s and 1930s, giving recitals in many of the leading artistic centres including Berlin, Vienna, Oslo, Stockholm, and Budapest. Iles broadcast frequently for the BBC, and appeared as concerto soloist with distinguished conductors including Sir Thomas Beecham, Sir Adrian Boult, and Willem Mengelberg.

From 1930 Iles became a close friend, protegee and pupil of the Russian composer and pianist Nikolai Medtner, who branded her "the bravest and ablest besieger of my musical fortresses" and dedicated to her his Russian Round Dance for two pianos. Edna Iles performed the cycle of three Medtner piano concertos at the Royal Albert Hall in 1946 and, following Medtner's death in 1951, continued to champion his piano music in many recitals and broadcasts in Britain and abroad. She also championed works by Ernest Bloch, Alan Bush, and Malcolm Arnold, and won praise from leading composers for the technical refinement and structural integrity of her interpretations. Edna Iles recorded her last recital for BBC Radio 3 in 1977 and in 1980 took part in a concert marking the centenary of Medtner's birth.

In 2001 she donated her entire library of Medtner material to the British Museum. It includes detailed notes on all her piano lessons with Medtner, which provide unique information on how the composer taught and wished his music to be interpreted. The archive is the subject of a doctoral thesis.

She died in Solihull, West Midlands in 2003, aged 97.
