= Johannes von Guenther =

German writer (1886–1973)

- Born: 26 March 1886; Mitau, Courland Governorate, Russian Empire
- Died: 28 May 1973 (aged 87); Munich, Bavaria, West Germany
- Other name: Johannes von Günther
- Occupations: Playwright; novelist

Johannes von Guenther or Johannes von Günther (1886–1973) was a German writer.

The 1929 silent film Cagliostro was adapted from one of his novels.

== Bibliography ==
- Ulrich Weisstein. Expressionism As an International Literary Phenomenon. John Benjamins Publishing, 1973.
