= Geoffrey Tozer =

Australian pianist, composer (1954–2009)

Background information
- Born: Geoffrey Peter Bede Hawkshaw Tozer; 5 November 1954; Mussoorie, India
- Origin: Australia
- Died: 21 August 2009 (aged 54) Melbourne, Australia
- Genre: Classical
- Occupation: Pianist
- Instrument: Piano
- Years active: 1962–2009
- Label: Chandos Records
- Website: geoffreytozerlegacy.com

Geoffrey Peter Bede Hawkshaw Tozer (5 November 1954 – 21 August 2009) was an Australian classical pianist and composer. A child prodigy, he composed an opera at the age of eight and became the youngest recipient of a Churchill Fellowship award at 13. His career included tours of Europe, America, Australia and China, where he performed the Yellow River Concerto to an estimated audience of 80 million people. Tozer had more than 100 concertos in his repertoire, including those of Mozart, Beethoven, Liszt, Brahms, Tchaikovsky, Medtner, Rachmaninoff, Bartók, Stravinsky, Prokofiev and Gerhard.

Tozer recorded for Chandos Records, beginning with the works of Medtner. He was regarded as a "superb recitalist" and had the ability to improvise, transpose "instantly" and reduce an orchestral score to a piano score at sight. Tozer won numerous awards and much recognition worldwide, but suffered comparative neglect in Australia, during the last years of his life.

== Early life ==
Conceived in Tasmania, Tozer was born in 1954 at Mussoorie, a hill station in the Indian Himalayas. His mother was Tassie Verna Fay Tozer (born Hawkshaw), a gifted musician and pianist who had become a music teacher to support herself and her two sons after her separation and subsequent divorce from Colonel (later Major-General) Donald Tozer.

In early 1954 she visited Tasmania to recover from a serious medical condition. There she met Geoffrey Conan-Davies, who was the son of an Anglican priest and who had studied theology himself during his years at Oxford University. He was a retired colonial administrator, formerly of East Africa, who was married to Ermyntrude (born Malet), with whom he had four children.

Veronica then returned to India, where Tozer was born. He lived his first four years in India, thanks to the generosity of Princess Usha. At the age of three, he picked out the notes of Beethoven's Appassionata Sonata, which his mother had been teaching a pupil.

He moved with his mother and older brother Peter to Melbourne, where Veronica taught him Beethoven, Bach and Bartók. He attended St Joseph's Parish School, Malvern, where, according to the historian Edward Duyker, he was subjected to "two years of violence and toxic stress by Brother Anselm [Hallam]", a notorious paedophile. He then attended De La Salle College, Malvern.

In 1962, at the age of eight, Tozer performed Bach's Concerto No. 5 in F minor with the Victorian Symphony Orchestra under Clive Douglas, in a concert that was televised nationally on ABC TV. In April 1964, at Melbourne's Nicholas Hall, he performed the same concerto with the Astra Orchestra under George Logie-Smith. In February 1965 he performed the Haydn Piano Concerto in D before a live audience at the Sidney Myer Music Bowl, a performance which can be heard on the disc issued to coincide with his Celebration Forty tour in 2004. Within four years he had played all five Beethoven concertos.

== Studies ==
Tozer studied with Eileen Ralf and Keith Humble in Australia, Maria Curcio (the last and favourite pupil of Artur Schnabel) in England and Theodore Lettvin in the United States. Eileen Ralf lived in Hobart, and the airline TAA flew Tozer there and back every week for lessons, free of charge. He later described Ralf's teaching as "the greatest musical gift given me". Aged 14, he became the youngest semi-finalist ever at the Leeds International Piano Competition and soon afterwards made his European debut at a BBC Promenade Concert in the Royal Albert Hall, with the BBC Symphony Orchestra conducted by Sir Colin Davis. He was the youngest person to be awarded a Churchill Fellowship.

In 1971, aged 16, he stayed with Benjamin Britten for several weeks. Britten invited him to perform at the Aldeburgh Festival, where he accompanied the cellist Mstislav Rostropovich.

Tozer performed at the inaugural concert of the Melbourne Concert Hall in 1982. In the early 1980s he taught at the University of Michigan. From 1983 he based himself in Canberra and briefly taught at the ANU School of Music, Australian National University before his touring and recording schedules made this impractical. His early recordings were not commercially released; his first commercial recording, in 1986, was of John Ireland's Piano Concerto in E-flat major with the Melbourne Symphony Orchestra conducted by David Measham, still considered by many the best recording of the work. In 1989 he worked with Peter Sculthorpe to record a disc of Sculthorpe's works for piano and strings.

== Later career ==
When Tatiana Nikolayeva visited Australia in the 1990s, she asked to be introduced to "the one who plays like a Russian" (meaning Tozer). In 1993, Tozer made his first tour of China, appearing in Beijing, Shanghai, Nanjing and other cities. In 1994, he made the first complete recording of the four piano concertos of Ottorino Respighi, with the BBC Philharmonic conducted by Sir Edward Downes.

In May 2001, Tozer was the first Western artist to perform the Yellow River Piano Concerto in China, at the invitation of the Chinese Ministry of Culture. His performance, which received a standing ovation, was broadcast live on Chinese national television and was watched by an estimated audience of 80 million people.

In May 2003, Tozer gave a recital in New York City with Colin McPhillamy in which they gave the first performance in the United States of Nikolai Medtner's The Treehouse. This followed an appearance in Birmingham to play in a tribute to Medtner's foremost pupil, the late Edna Iles.

Tozer championed the music of many under-recorded composers, such as Respighi, Alan Rawsthorne, John Blackwood McEwen, Erich Wolfgang Korngold, Roberto Gerhard, Percy Grainger, John Ireland (the Piano Concerto in E-flat major) and Nikolai Tcherepnin. At one Berlin Festival, Tozer gave an all-Artur Schnabel concert in the presence of the entire Schnabel family; he also recorded Schnabel's music.

Tozer also championed another Melbourne prodigy, pianist Noel Mewton-Wood, who died in 1953. Tozer said of him: "He was the most stimulating and intellectually powerful pianist Australia has ever produced. He had been completely forgotten before his work reappeared on CD and everyone realised how revolutionary his playing was." Tozer first heard of him when he prepared to play Bach and Beethoven as a seven-year-old for Mewton-Wood's former Melbourne teacher, Waldemar Seidel. "I played a few bars and he jumped up shouting, 'Noel's come back'. I had never heard of him, of course. But, after listening to his records, I realised it was the greatest musical compliment I've ever received." Tozer arranged for solo piano some of the music written by Mewton-Wood for the 1944 film Tawny Pipit.

He also created the piano reduction of the vocal score for Minoru Miki's opera An Actor's Revenge.

Tozer was a noted improviser. He sometimes ended formal recitals by improvisations using themes and styles suggested by the audience: Donizetti, Bellini, Rossini, Verdi, Wagner, Bartók, Piazzolla, Cage, Satie, Gershwin and Brahms simultaneously, and many others.

In January 2003, to celebrate Miriam Hyde's 90th birthday, the ABC broadcast Tozer performing her music live from the Eugene Goossens Hall, Sydney. This included her Piano Sonata in G minor. He played one of her two piano concertos at the Australian Institute of Music in 2005, to an audience of only 15 people. Hyde said that the concerto needed someone of Tozer's power to play it.

In an obituary after Tozer's death, former Australian prime minister Paul Keating lashed the "indifference" and "malevolence" toward Tozer from the arts establishment in Australia. He had last played with the Melbourne Symphony Orchestra in 1994 and with the Sydney Symphony Orchestra in 1995.

== Honours and awards ==
Tozer received several major awards twice in his lifetime. He won his first Churchill Fellowship at 14 and won a second at 17; this was possible only because the Churchill committee decided to lower the minimum age by five years in recognition of Tozer's talents. He was also twice awarded Israel's Rubinstein Medal, in 1977 and 1980; on the first occasion, he was handed the prize personally by Arthur Rubinstein who described him as "an extraordinary pianist".

He was awarded two consecutive Australian Artists Creative Fellowships, worth more than A$500,000 in total, in the 1990s. The grants were inaugurated after Paul Keating met Tozer while he was teaching at St Edmund's College, the Canberra school where Keating's son Patrick was a student. Keating, who cites Tozer as Australia's greatest pianist, said he felt "ashamed" that a pianist of Tozer's talents was earning only A$9,000 a year, so he introduced the fellowships (they are sometimes referred to as "the Keatings") and the first five-year award in 1989 (A$329,000) went to Tozer. He was the subject of at least one political cartoon.

The fellowships allowed Tozer to travel to London to commence his recording career. He recorded most of the solo piano works of Nikolai Medtner. His recording for Chandos of the three Medtner piano concertos with the London Philharmonic Orchestra conducted by Neeme Järvi won a Diapason d'Or prize in 1992 and was also nominated for a Grammy award. Although a few recordings of the concertos had been made before the advent of CDs, Tozer's recordings are regarded as an important early addition to the recorded repertoire of the Medtner concertos using modern recording techniques. His Medtner recordings were described by the French critic Alain Cochard as "a landmark in recorded history". He wrote "All that Medtner demands, Tozer possesses. This is the playing of a grand master; there is no doubt about it". In 2001, on the anniversary of Nikolai Medtner's death, he gave a recital of Medtner's works to a capacity audience in Melbourne; however, this concert received no reviews in any media.

His other international awards included Hungary's Liszt Centenary Medallion, Belgium's Prix Alex de Vries and Britain's Royal Overseas League Medallion, although he received no similar honours in Australia.

In 1996 his recording of piano works by Ferruccio Busoni won the Soundscapes (Australia) prize for "Record of the Year".

Among Tozer's unpublished recordings are some of historical interest, such as his recording with the tenor Gerald English of Sir Michael Tippett's song cycle Boyhood's End.

== Death ==
While Tozer was undoubtedly affected by the death of his mother in 1996, and that of his long-time manager Reuben Fineberg in 1997, it is debatable whether, as some obituaries claimed, he "became unwell but carried on". According to his medical records, his illness did not become apparent until at least seven years after the death of his mother.

On 21 August 2009, he died from liver disease at the East Malvern house in Melbourne in which he lived as a child, having been released from the Alfred Hospital the previous week. He was survived by four of five siblings.

A public memorial service was held on 1 October 2009 at St Patrick's Cathedral, Melbourne. In a stinging address that lasted 45 minutes, the former prime minister, Paul Keating, said that Tozer

deserved to be remembered alongside the Australian triumvirate of Nellie Melba, Percy Grainger and Joan Sutherland, he was treated with indifference, contempt and malevolence by the Melbourne and Sydney symphony orchestras. The people who chose repertoire for those two orchestras and who had charge of the selection of artists during this period should hang their heads in shame at their neglect of him. ... If anyone needs a case example of the bitchiness and preference within the arts in Australia, here you have it.

Keating described the death of Tozer as "like Canada having lost Glenn Gould, or France, Ginette Neveu. It is a massive cultural loss, the kind of loss people felt when Germany lost Dresden." He compared Tozer to the pianists Emil Gilels, Arthur Rubinstein, Sviatoslav Richter, Ferruccio Busoni, Artur Schnabel, and the soprano Maria Callas, who died alone in Paris in 1977. Keating said, "In the end, his liver failed. But I think I have to say we all let him down. ... We should have cared more and done more."

Janine Hosking's 2018 documentary about Tozer, The Eulogy, featuring Richard Gill, was triggered by Keating's speech.

== Legacy ==
Tozer's legacy is preserved at the official Geoffrey Tozer Legacy website, which is administered by his estate and includes "more than 12,000 documents, 750 recordings of his performances, and a number of interviews from around the world, 3000 photographs, four portraits, film and video, prizes and awards from around the world, personal effects including performance apparel, 29 archival boxes of Tozer's annotated performance scores, 1500 books on music from his personal library, and his own drawings, caricatures and paintings, and more than 200 original Tozer compositions".
