= Éditions Russes de Musique =

Éditions Russes de Musique was a music publishing company operating in Germany, Russia, France, the UK and the US.

It was founded in 1909 by Serge Koussevitzky and his second wife Natalia and focused on new Russian music.

In 1914 Koussevitzky purchased the Moscow-based publishing firm Gutheil from Carl Gutheil, merging it into Éditions Russes. This gave the firm the rights to music composed by Aleksander Gurilyov, Aleksandr Varlamov, Mily Balakirev, Alexander Dargomyzhsky, Mikhail Glinka, Sergei Rachmaninoff, and Alexander Serov.

The headquarters moved to Paris in 1920, after the Russian Revolution. The firm was sold to Boosey & Hawkes on March 1, 1947.

== Names of imprints ==
- Russischer Musikverlag
- Editions Russes de Musique
- Édition russe de musique
- Rossiyskoe muzykalnoye izdatelstvo (Российское музыкальное издательство)
- A. Gutheil (1914–1947)

== Plates ==
IMSLP catalogues printing plates from dates ranging from 1909 to 1938, covering composers both well-known and less well-known.
