= ArkivMusic =

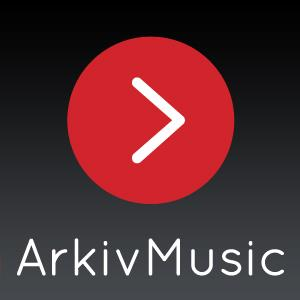
Logo of ArkivMusic

ArkivMusic, Inc. is an American, Tennessee-based online classical music retailer, specializing in the distribution of CDs and DVDs.

ArkivMusic opened its online store in February 2002.

In addition to their inventory of readily available CDs, the ArkivCD reissue program carried a selection of "on-demand" titles for items no longer in the catalogue. These titles, produced on CD-Rs, included licensed recordings that were previously unissued, or no longer in press, on CD.

In 2008, ArkivMusic was acquired by Steinway Musical Instruments. In 2010, ArkivMusic started a record label focused, albeit not exclusively, on recordings by pianists in the Steinway Artist program; the label is named for Steinway & Sons. In 2015, ArkivMusic was purchased by Naxos. The company is now "ArkivMusic, Inc.".

In December 2021, the website closed for maintenance until further notice. ArkivMusic launched a "New Release Shop" in 2022, along with a new site design.
