= Oda Slobodskaya =

Russian opera singer

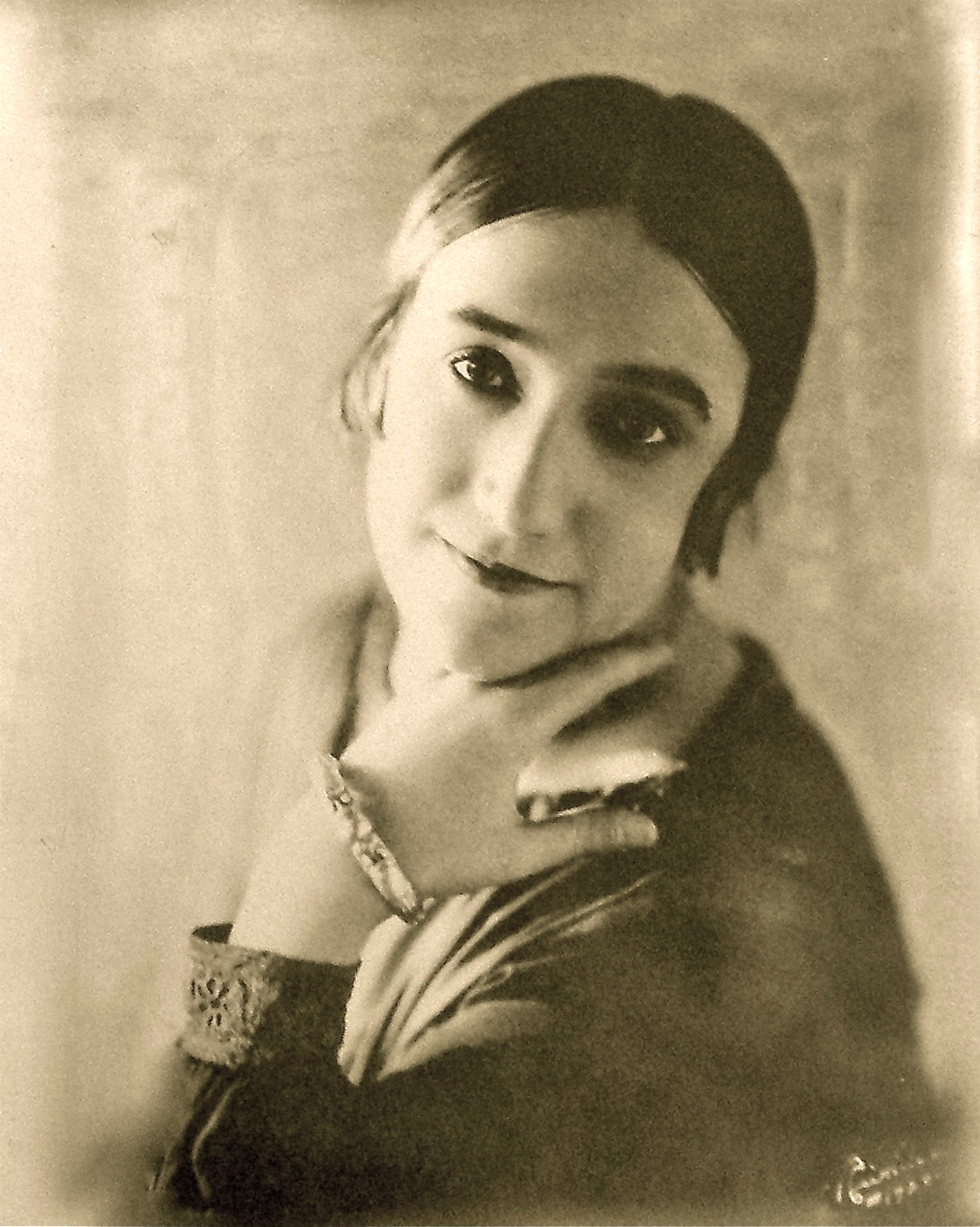

Background information
- Also known as: Odali Careno
- Born: 28 November 1888 (10 December NS); Vilno, Russian Empire (now Vilnius, Lithuania)
- Died: 30 July 1970 (aged 81) London, England Liberal Jewish Cemetery Willesden, London Borough of Brent, Greater London, England
- Occupation: Opera singer

Oda Abramovna Slobodskaya (Russian: Ода Абрамовна Слободская, 28 November OS/10 December 1888 NS – 30 July 1970) was a Russian operatic soprano who became a British citizen.

== Early life ==
Slobodskaya was born on 28 November 1888 in Vilno (now Vilnius, Lithuania). She was one of seven children. She won a scholarship for secondary education but, having completed her schooling, to her displeasure, found herself working with her parents in a second-hand clothes shop.

Knowing she had a good voice, in 1907 she applied for an audition at the Saint Petersburg Conservatory. Having no classical repertoire she sang the simple songs she had learned as a child. Despite this lack of sophistication, her vocal potential was immediately apparent. The Director, Glazunov, and Natalya Iretskaya (the most important Russian singing tutor and herself a pupil of Pauline Viardot) accepted her and awarded her a scholarship for nine years' study. As a student, she performed Beethoven's 9th Symphony under Sergei Koussevitzky.

== The Mariinsky Theatre ==
In 1916 Slobodskaya made her debut, as Lisa in Tchaikovsky's The Queen of Spades the Mariinsky Theatre. She sang with the company for the next five years and performed many of the principal soprano parts of the Russian repertory as well as Sieglinde, Marguerite in Faust, Elisabeth de Valois, and Aida. The revolution having broken out, she was obliged to join other singers on obligatory tours to factories and farms to entertain the workers and to be fed. She sang with the bass Fyodor Chaliapin.

== To Berlin ==
In 1921 Slobodskaya fled from Russia to Berlin where she was soon invited to sing. Success there brought a call from Sergei Diaghilev to join him in Paris, France, to star in the premiere of Stravinsky's opera Mavra in 1922. Chaliapin then invited her to be principal soprano in the company he was forming to tour Western Europe and she sang with him in Paris.

== To America ==
The impresario Rabinoff organised for Slobodskaya to tour in North and South America as a soloist with The Ukrainian Chorus, and while in America she made a solo debut at Carnegie Hall in New York City, led by Alexander Koshetz. As a displaced Russian living abroad when appreciation of the Russian repertoire was minimal, Slobodskaya had difficulty finding a manager. To augment her classical career, she created a parallel identity in vaudeville, singing operatic arias and ballads under the pseudonym "Odali Careno". She applied for American citizenship in 1922 and remained in the US for nearly seven years.

== To England ==
In 1930 she was booked, as Odali Careno, for two weeks at the London Palladium. She had a great success, was immediately re-engaged, and was later twice invited to star in Royal Command Performances before King George V and Queen Mary. She also re-established her classical career, appearing at the Lyceum with Chaliapin as Natasha in Alexander Dargomïzhsky's Rusalka. In 1932, following her marriage to Captain Raymond Pelly, England became her permanent home.

== Covent Garden debut ==
The same year (1932) she made her Covent Garden debut as Fevronia in a concert performance of Rimsky-Korsakov's Legend of the Invisible City of Kitezh, and as Venus in Tannhauser with Sir Thomas Beecham. She again sang Fevroniya, in Italian, at La Scala, Milan in 1933, and sang Palmyra in Thomas Beecham's production of Frederick Delius's Koanga at Covent Garden in 1935. In 1936 she took part in a Russian season at the Teatro Colón, Buenos Aires and sang Khivrya in Modest Moussorgsky's Fair at Sorochintsï at the Savoy and on an English tour in 1941 and subsequent years.

== Work for the BBC ==
Throughout the 1930s she was much in demand by the BBC for concert performances of opera (notably as the heroine of Dmitry Shostakovich's Lady Macbeth of the Mtsensk District) and for recitals of Russian song. A regular performer in the Promenade concerts, she also recorded Russian art songs including many by pianist/composer Nicolas Medtner. There followed wartime entertainment work and participation in the National Gallery Concerts of Myra Hess.

== Records ==
After the war, during which her husband had died, Slobodskaya's career was much reduced, though she made her only movie appearance as a Prima Donna in the 1951 film The Magic Box. She rekindled her concert career with some highly acclaimed recitals in the Wigmore Hall. Saga records "rediscovered" her in the late 1950s and released two LP records. These records prompted Decca to recall that they had several unissued Slobodskaya recordings from 1939–1945 which included the definitive performance of "Tatiana's letter Scene" from Eugene Onegin. These were released in 1961 together with some newly recorded items. The Shostakovitch Six Spanish Songs, Kabalevsky Seven Nursery Rhymes, a fine set of Polish songs and an LP of classical Russian art and folk songs also followed. In 1974 SAGA released a record (numbered SAGA 5357) on which Slobodskaya sings songs by Mussorgsky, accompanied on piano by Ivor Newton.

== Tributes ==
Slobodskaya had a rich, strongly accented speaking voice and a characterful turn of phrase, and liked to give spoken introductions to her songs. This led to one of her last, great successes, in the speaking role of Narrator in "Peter and the Wolf", recording date unknown and released on Fidelio records in 1964 with the Colonne Concerts Orchestra under Isaie Disenhaus.

She was a much admired Professor of Singing at the Royal College of Music and the Guildhall School of Music, where her pupils included sopranos Patricia Reakes and Yvonne Fuller and contraltos Anne Collins and Annette Thompson, and, until her very last year, continued to give recitals of Russian song. She died in London, aged 81, on 30 July 1970.

== Filmography ==
- Whom the Gods Love (1936)
- The Magic Box (1951)

== Sources ==
- Leonard, Maurice (1979), Slobodskaya: a biography of Oda Slobodskaya, Gollancz, ISBN 978-0-575-02622-3
- Oda Slobodskaya (Spring 1956), "An Approach to the Russian Art-Song", Tempo (39), Cambridge Journals: 6–8, JSTOR 943415
