= P. Jurgenson =

Russian classical sheet music publisher

- Native name: П. Юргенсон
- Industry: Music publishing
- Founded: 1861
- Founder: Pyotr Jurgenson
- Defunct: 1918 (original company)
- Fate: Nationalized in 1918
- Successor: Muzgiz (later Muzika)
- Headquarters: Moscow, Russia
- Key people: Boris Jurgenson; Grigory Jurgenson
- Products: Sheet music

P. Jurgenson was a Russian music publishing house founded in 1861 in Moscow by Pyotr Jurgenson. It became one of the leading publishers of classical music in Russia and is particularly known for publishing the works of Pyotr Ilyich Tchaikovsky.

== History ==
Founded in 1861, by Pyotr Jurgenson, the firm — in its original form, or as it was amalgamated in 1918 with other Russian music publishing firms into the state-owned music publishing monopoly. He established the firm with encouragement from Nikolai Rubinstein, founder of the Moscow Conservatory. The company operated as a private publisher until its nationalization in 1918.

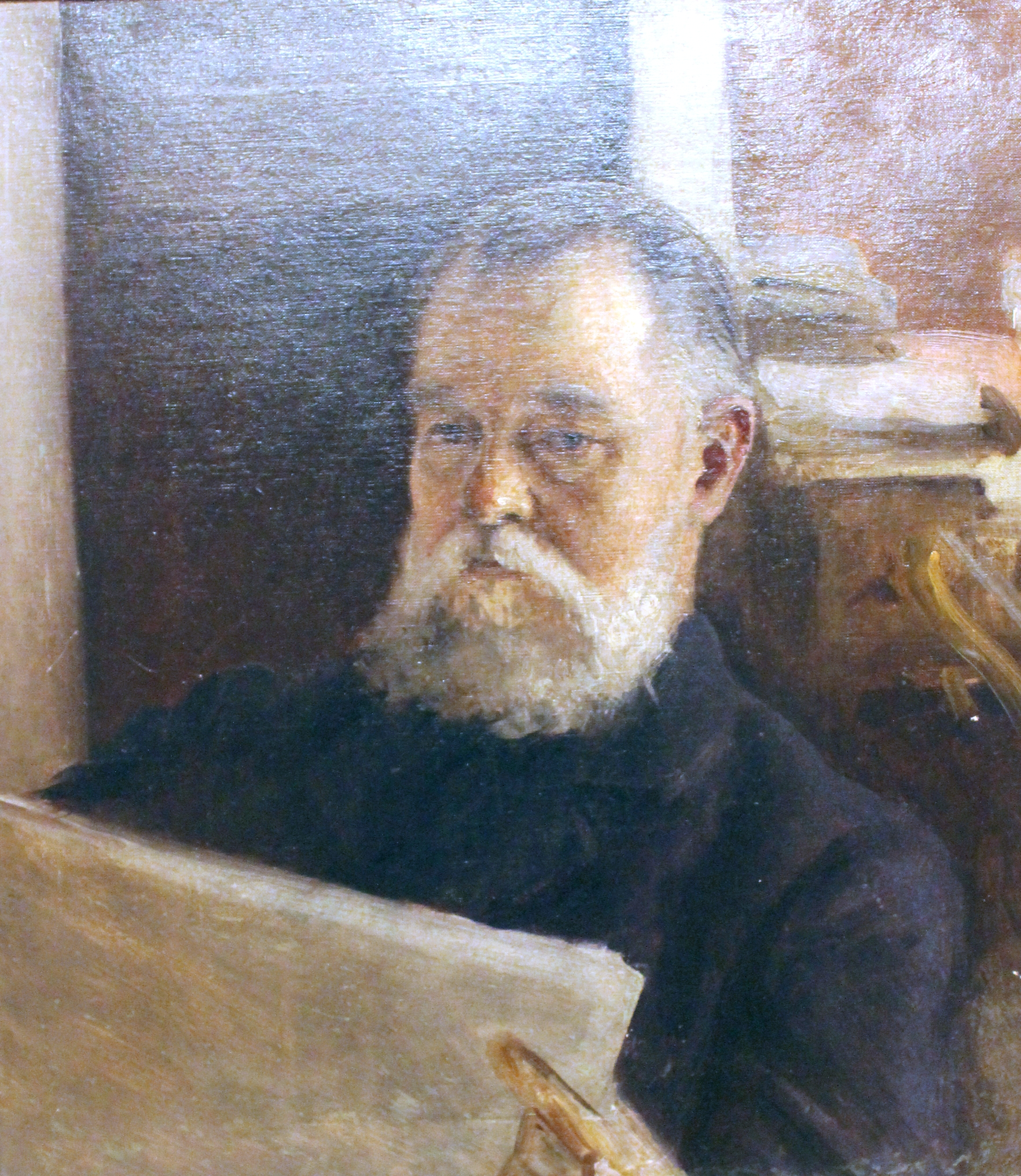
Pyotr Ivanovich Jurgenson's portrait by his daughter Aleksandra

In 1868, Jurgenson published Tchaikovsky's first composition, and henceforth, nearly all of his other works. In Tchaikovsky's early career, Jurgenson gave him supportive commissions, including some for piano transcriptions, orchestrations, and translations of works by others. Jurgenson published many of Tchaikovsky’s works and played a significant role in disseminating his compositions.

Russian composer Sergei Rachmaninoff also wrote to music ethnographer Aleksandr Zatayevich about publishing folk Polish mazurkas in Jurgenson's house.

=== 1918 nationalization ===
In 1918, the company was nationalized following the Russian Revolution and was incorporated into the State Publishing House. It later became known as Muzgiz and then Muzika.

=== Dissolution of the Soviet Union ===
Following the dissolution of the Soviet Union (1990 to 1991), state-owned enterprises, including Muzyka, suffered from newly imposed austere budgets. Muzyka lost its actual monopoly and its leading positions in several areas. As of 2006, Muzyka was owned by the Russian Federation, but the government was planning to privatize it that year. The strategic plan to resuscitate Muzyka was to focus on educational literature.

=== The new P. Jurgenson music publishing house ===
In 2004, Muzyka's acting director, Dr. Mark A. Zilberquit (with the support of the publisher's great-grandson and President of the P. Jurgenson Charitable Fund, Boris Jurgenson), led an effort to register a newly formed P. Jurgenson music publishing company as a Russian company. The new P. Jurgenson company does not possess Muzyka's assets that were once held by the original P. Jurgenson.
