= Nikolai Medtner =

Russian composer and pianist (1880–1951)

- Николай Метнер
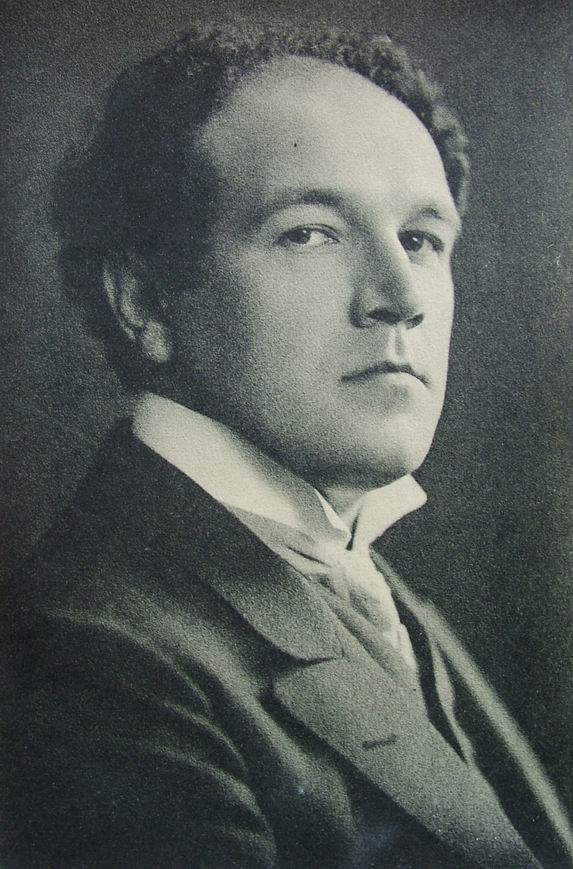
- Medtner on a 1910 postcard
- Born: 5 January 1880 [O.S. 24 December 1879] Moscow, Russia
- Died: 13 November 1951 (aged 71); Golders Green, England
- Works: List of compositions

Nikolai Karlovich Medtner (Russian: Николай Карлович Метнер, romanized: Nikolay Karlovich Metner; 5 January 1880 [O.S. 24 December 1879] – 13 November 1951) was a Russian composer and pianist.

A younger contemporary of Sergei Rachmaninoff and Alexander Scriabin, he wrote a substantial number of compositions, all of which include the piano. His works include 14 piano sonatas, three violin sonatas, three piano concerti, a piano quintet, two works for two pianos, many shorter piano pieces, a few shorter works for violin and piano, and 108 songs including two substantial works for vocalise. His 38 Skazki (generally known as "Fairy Tales" in English but more correctly translated as "Tales") for piano solo contain some of his most original music.

== Biography ==
Nikolai Medtner was born in Moscow on 24 December 1879, according to the Julian calendar, or 5 January 1880 by the Gregorian calendar. He was the son of Karl Petrovich Medtner (1846–1921) and Alexandra Karlovna Goedicke (1843–1918), and the fifth of their six children. Both of them were of German origin.

Medtner took piano lessons from his mother until the age of ten. He also had lessons from his mother's brother, Fyodor Goedicke (the father of his more famous cousin Alexander Goedicke). He entered the Moscow Conservatory in 1891, and graduated nine years later in 1900, at the age of 20, receiving the Anton Rubinstein prize, having studied under Pavel Pabst, Wassily Sapellnikoff, Vasily Safonov and Sergei Taneyev among others. Despite his conservative musical tastes, Medtner's compositions and his pianism were highly regarded by his contemporaries.

With the support of Taneyev, Medtner rejected a career as a performer and turned to composition, partly inspired by Ludwig van Beethoven's late piano sonatas and string quartets. His composing career began professionally in 1903, when he started publishing his music, and it began to be performed. With the publication of his First Piano Sonata in F minor, he was noticed by Sergei Rachmaninoff, who would remain a friend of Medtner's throughout his life, as well as a supporter of his composing. Among his students in that period were Alexander Vasilyevich Alexandrov and Xenia Prochorowa.

During the years leading up to the 1917 Russian Revolution, Medtner lived at home with his parents. During that time, he fell in love with Anna Mikhaylovna Bratenskaya (1877–1965), a respected violinist and the young wife of his older brother Emil. Later, when World War I broke out, Emil was interned in Germany where he had been studying. It was during a holiday in Crimea with his friend and fellow composer-pianist Aleksandr Goldenweiser that Medtner composed the first of his three piano concerti. Emil generously gave Anna the freedom to marry his brother, and Medtner and Anna were married in 1918.

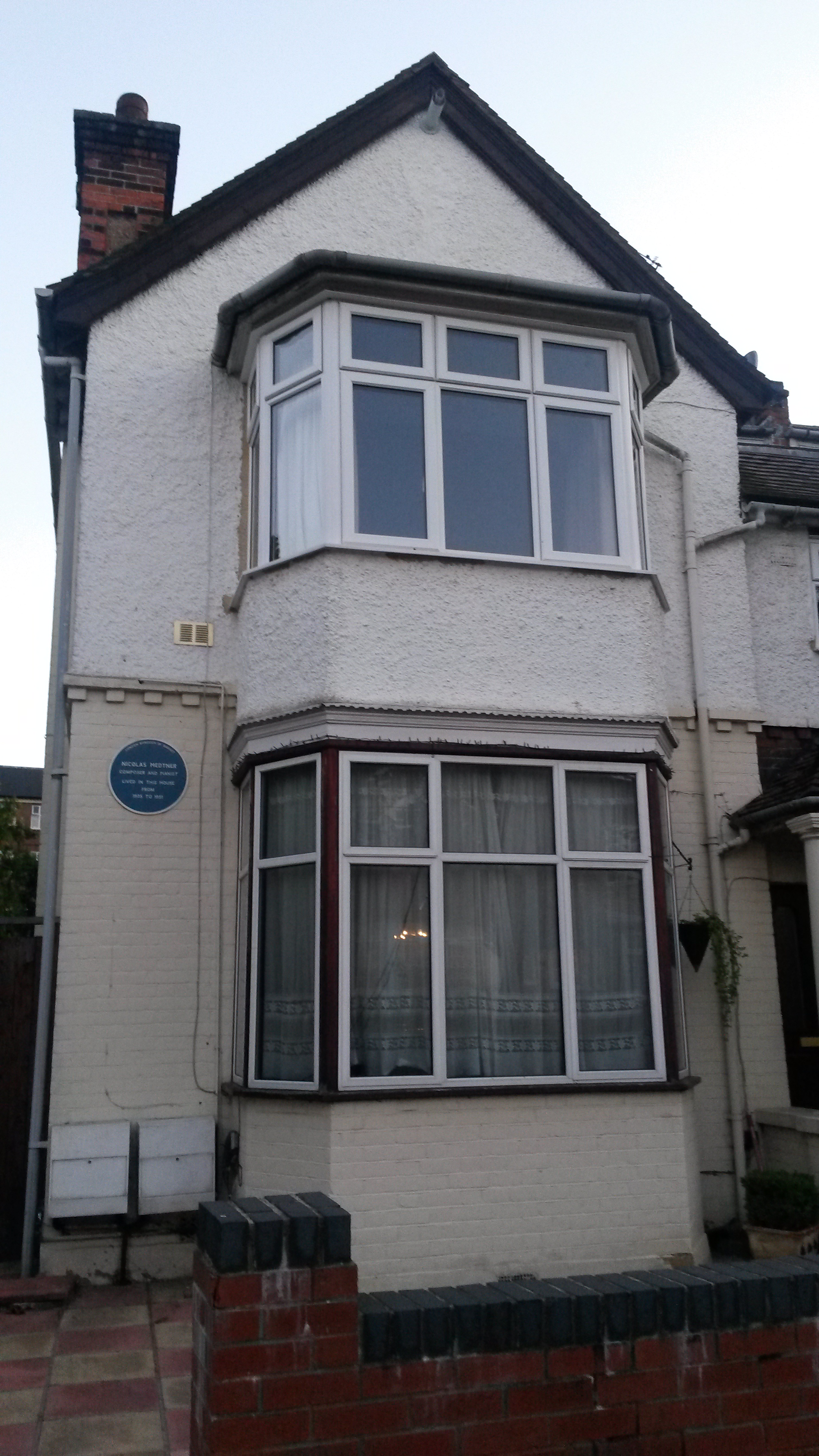
Medtner's home at Golders Green, London, where he lived from 1935 to 1951

Unlike Rachmaninoff, Medtner did not leave Russia until well after the Revolution. Rachmaninoff secured him a tour of the United States and Canada in 1924, and his recitals were often all-Medtner evenings, consisting of sonatas interspersed with songs and shorter pieces. He never adapted himself to the commercial aspects of touring and his concerts became infrequent. Esteemed in England, he and Anna settled in London in 1936, modestly teaching, playing and composing, to a strict daily routine.

At the outbreak of World War II, Medtner's income from German publishers disappeared and, during that hardship, ill-health became an increasing problem. His devoted pupil, Edna Iles, gave him shelter in Warwickshire, where he completed his Third Piano Concerto, first performed in 1944. In 1949, a Medtner Society was founded in London by Jayachamarajendra Wadiyar Bahadur, the Maharajah of Mysore (the princely state in Karnataka, southern India). In 1945, the Maharajah became an honorary Fellow of Trinity College of Music, London, and was the first president of the London Philharmonia Concert Society. He founded the Medtner Society to record all of Medtner's works. Medtner, already in declining health, recorded his three piano concertos and some sonatas, chamber music, numerous songs and shorter works, before his death in London in 1951. In one of those recordings he partnered Benno Moiseiwitsch in his two-piano work entitled "Russian Round-Dance", Op 58 No. 1. In another he accompanied Elisabeth Schwarzkopf in several of his lieder, including The Muse, a Pushkin setting from 1913. In gratitude to his patron, Medtner dedicated his Third Piano Concerto to the Maharajah of Mysore.

Medtner died at his home at Golders Green, London on 13 November 1951, and is buried alongside his brother Emil in Hendon Cemetery.

== Music ==
=== Piano sonatas ===
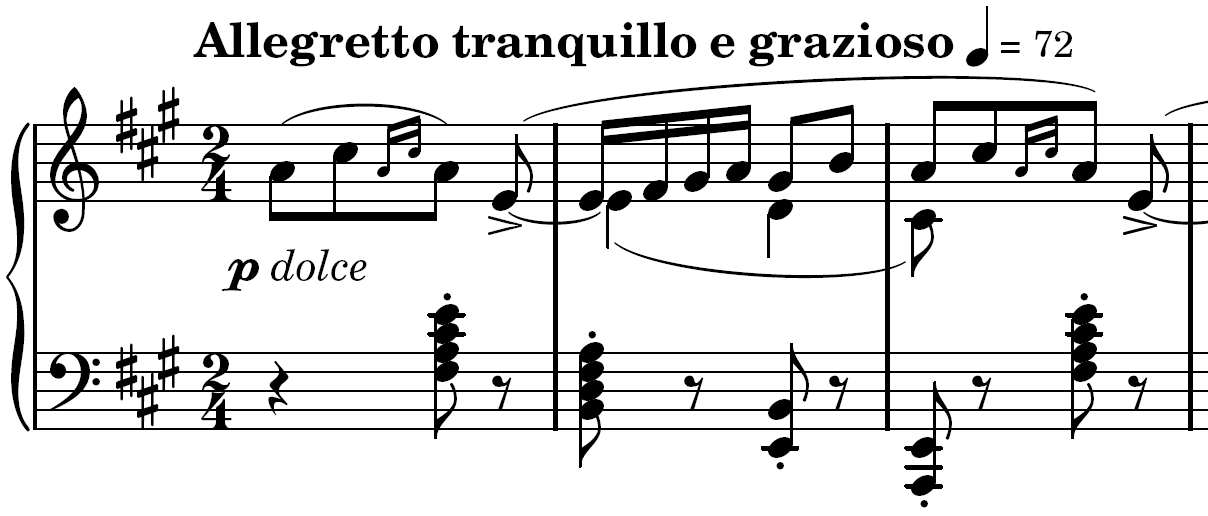
Tale from Op. 51, No. 3

Medtner composed 14 piano sonatas.

The First Piano Sonata in F minor, Op. 5, is a four-movement work written between 1901–3 (completed August 1903); though it suggests the style of Scriabin or Rachmaninoff, it is nonetheless original. Medtner's craft gained subtlety and complexity in later years, but this work is already evidence of his mastery of musical structure. An opening Allegro, dramatic and imbued like much Russian music with a bell-like sonority, is separated by an Intermezzo from a Largo divoto that reaches a Maestoso climax before plunging into the headlong Allegro risoluto finale.

The Second, Third and Fourth piano sonatas are unrelated one-movement works. They were written during the period 1904–07 and published as the "Sonata-Triad", Op. 11. The first of the trio, in A♭, is an ecstatic work with attractive, lyrical themes, prefaced by a poem by Goethe. The second, in D minor, is entitled "Sonate-Elegie". It opens slowly with one of Medtner's best-known themes and closes with an animated coda (Allegro molto doppio movimento, in D major) based on the second subject. The third, in C, returns to the lyricism of the first.

The Fifth and formerly the most popular of his sonatas is the G minor, Op. 22, written in 1909–1910. The piece alternates a slow introduction with a three-theme, propulsive sonata movement, one of whose themes was heard in the Introduction. The emotional center of this compact work (sixteen minutes in duration) is the Interludium: Andante lugubre: this comprises most of the development section and contains some of Medtner's loveliest harmonies. There are historic recordings by Moiseiwitch and Gilels.

The Sixth Sonata followed soon after, the first of two that comprise his Op. 25. It bears the title "Sonata-Skazka", usually translated as "Fairy Tale Sonata". This short work in C minor, written in 1910–11, is in three movements; the second and third are connected. The first movement is a compact sonata-form, the slow movement rondo-like (the similarity to one melody by Rachmaninoff is coincidental, as the latter was not written until some thirty years later). A minatory final march with variations ends with a Coda that revisits earlier material. This was the only Medtner sonata that Rachmaninoff performed.

Its companion in Op. 25 is entirely different. The Seventh Sonata in E minor, Night Wind, after Fyodor Tyutchev's 1832 poem "Of what do you howl, night wind...?" (Russian: О чем ты воешь, ветр ночной...?, romanized: O chem ty voesh', vetr nochnoy...?), an excerpt of which provides an epigraph, was completed in 1911 and dedicated to Sergei Rachmaninoff, who immediately recognised its greatness. It is a vast one-movement work, lasting almost 35 minutes, in two major parts: an Introduction and Allegro sonata-form, followed by a Fantasy capped by a shadowy but active Coda, the latter entirely and ingeniously based on material presented in the Introduction. Under the title "Sonata" Medtner added a note: "The whole piece is in an epic spirit" (Вся пьеса в эпическом духе). Geoffrey Tozer said: "it has the reputation of being a fearsomely difficult work of extraordinary length, exhausting to play and to hear, but of magnificent quality and marvelous invention."

The Eighth "Sonata-Ballade" in F♯, Op. 27, began as a one-movement work, and was expanded into its present form over the period 1912–14. It comprises a Ballade, Introduction and Finale. The tonality and some of the material make passing reference to Chopin's Barcarolle. The first movement opens with one of Medtner's lovely pastoral melodies. The finale, like the Piano Quintet, has a thematic connection with his Pushkin setting The Muse. Medtner himself recorded this work.

The one-movement Ninth Sonata in A minor, Op. 30, was published without a title but was known as the "War Sonata" among Medtner's friends; a footnote "during the war 1914–1917" appeared in the 1959 Collected Edition.

The Tenth "Sonata-reminiscenza" in A minor, Op. 38, No. 1, commences a set of eight pieces entitled "Forgotten Melodies (First Cycle)". Two further cycles followed, published as Op. 39 and 40. Both this and the following sonata were completed in 1920, the year before Medtner emigrated. This single movement is one of Medtner's most poetic creations; as the title indicates, its character is nostalgic and wistful. Other pieces in opus 38 contain variants of the Sonata's opening theme, such as the concluding "Alla Reminiscenza". This sonata is nowadays the most often performed.

The Eleventh, "Sonata Tragica" in C minor, Op. 39, No. 5, concludes "Forgotten Melodies (Second Cycle)". There is some repetition of themes in this set as well—the piece which precedes the Sonata, "Canzona Matinata", contains a theme which recurs in the Sonata, and according to Medtner's wishes both pieces are to be played attacca—without pause. This is also a single movement sonata-allegro form, but Allegro, dramatic and ferocious, with three themes of which one (the reminiscence from "Canzona Matinata") does not return. A violent coda concludes. This sonata is well served by recordings, including one by Medtner in 1947.

The Twelfth Sonata, entitled "Romantica" in B♭ minor, Op. 53, No. 1, was completed at the end of 1930, along with its twin. It was premièred in Glasgow in 1931. Returning to a four-movement form, it consists of a Romance (B♭ minor), Scherzo (E♭ minor), Meditazione (B minor), and Finale (B♭ minor). The ending quotes his Sonata-Skazka, Op. 25, No. 1.

The Thirteenth Sonata, the "Minacciosa" ("menacing") in F minor, Op. 53, No. 2, is another one-movement work. It is highly chromatic, and contains a fugue. Medtner described it as "my most contemporary composition, for it reflects the threatening atmosphere of contemporary events". Marc-André Hamelin described it as "the most concentrated 15 minutes of music one could ever hope to play or listen to". It was dedicated to the Canadian pianist and pupil of Scriabin, Alfred La Liberté, one of Medtner's most loyal supporters.

The last of the sonatas, "Sonata-Idyll" in G major, Op. 56, was completed in 1937. It consists of two movements: a short Allegretto cantabile Pastorale and a sonata allegro Allegro moderato e cantabile (sempre al rigore di tempo).

=== Piano concertos ===
Medtner composed three piano concertos:

- Piano Concerto No. 1 in C minor, Op. 33 (1914–18). Dedicated to the composer's mother, this one-movement work opens with an exposition section setting out the material for the work, the opening pages of which erupt with fireworks from the piano against a surging orchestral statement of the subject. A set of variations make up the central development before the opening returns two thirds of the way through the piece. Eventually the coda sets out the romantic "big tune" before the final pages lead to an unexpectedly bittersweet ending.
- Piano Concerto No. 2 in C minor, Op. 50 (1920–27). Dedicated to Rachmaninoff, who dedicated his own Fourth Concerto to Medtner. In three movements: Toccata, and a Romanza from which follows a Divertimento. The first movement is propulsive with kinetic energy, and there is much dialogue between piano and orchestra (a subsidiary theme resembles the Fairy Tale from the Op. 14 (1906–07) pair, the March of the Paladin). The Romanza and Divertimento are each in their own way varied in character, the Divertimento particularly rich in inspiration.
- Piano Concerto No. 3 in E minor "Ballade", Op. 60, 1940–43. The factors which led to the creation of this work are closely connected to the circumstances of his final years. It is dedicated to his generous patron, the Maharajah of Mysore. Three connected movements: the first, Con moto largamente, sustained and profound, slowly developing motion and energy; the second an Interludium, Allegro, molto sostenuto, misterioso quotes the first movement and prefigures the finale; a lengthy Allegro molto. Svegliando, eroico vigorously concludes the work. Medtner recorded all three Concertos with the Philharmonia Orchestra in 1947.

=== Chamber music ===
Medtner's chamber music includes three violin sonatas and a piano quintet:

- Violin Sonata No. 3 in E minor, Op. 57 (1938). Recorded by David Oistrakh, among others. A vast work in four movements, a counterpart to his Night Wind Piano Sonata, No. 7. Introduzione – Andante meditamente, Scherzo – Allegro molto vivace, leggiero, Andante con moto, Finale – Allegro molto. A motto theme in the Introduction juxtaposes chords quietly but insistently, joined by a melody on the violin. The melody becomes the first theme of the – lengthy – sonata-form movement that follows, juxtaposed with other themes including a march in imitation. The folksy and syncopated Scherzo in A minor, thematically related to the opening movement's faster sections, is in Rondo-form. After a reminiscence of the motto, the Andante is a lament in F minor, extremely Russian in sentiment. The virtuoso Finale has thematic elements related to Russian Orthodox liturgical music (Medtner was born Lutheran but late in life converted to Orthodox).
- Piano Quintet in C major, Op. posth. It was published after the composer's death. He worked on sketches of the work from 1903 until its completion in 1949. Medtner considered it the ultimate summary of his musical life. Due to Medtner's illness, the piano part in the work's premiere was taken by Colin Horsley. Medtner's recording of the work with the Aeolian Quartet, unpublished at the time, has been released on the St Laurent label.

=== Songs ===
Medtner published over 100 songs for voice and piano, with words from texts by Pushkin, Goethe, Mikhail Lermontov, Fyodor Tyutchev, and Afanasy Fet, among others.

== Legacy ==
"I repeat what I said to you back in Russia: you are, in my opinion, the greatest composer of our time."
— Sergei Rachmaninoff (1921)

Medtner became an admirer of singer Maria Olenina-d'Alheim, and she premiered many of his chamber music pieces in the years following 1896. Edward Mitchell was an early champion of Medtner, and gave the first complete performance of Medtner's Sonata-Triad in the UK at the Aeolian Hall on 3 February 1922. His student Abram Shatskes helped popularize his piano compositions during the Khrushchev thaw, and Geoffrey Tozer recorded almost all of Medtner's works for the piano including all the concertos and sonatas. Hamish Milne has recorded most of the solo piano works, while Geoffrey Douglas Madge, Konstantin Scherbakov and Yevgeny Sudbin have recorded the three piano concertos.

Other pianists who championed Medtner's work and left behind recordings include Benno Moiseiwitsch, Sviatoslav Richter, Edna Iles, Emil Gilels, Yevgeny Svetlanov, Earl Wild, Grigory Ginzburg and Aleksandr Goldenweiser. In modern times, pianists noted for their advocacy include Ekaterina Derzhavina, Marc-André Hamelin, Malcolm Binns, Irina Mejoueva (ja), Nikolai Demidenko, Anna Zassimova, Boris Berezovsky, Paul Stewart, Dmitri Alexeev, Evgeny Kissin, Andrey Ponochevny, Konstantin Lifschitz, Daniil Trifonov, Gintaras Januševičius, Dina Parakhina, Alessandro Taverna and Paulius Andersson.

Far fewer singers have tackled the songs. Medtner himself recorded a selection with the sopranos Oda Slobodskaya, Tatiana Makushina, Margaret Ritchie and Elisabeth Schwarzkopf. In recent times Susan Gritton and Ludmilla Andrew have recorded complete CDs with Geoffrey Tozer, as has Caroline Vitale with Peter Baur. The bass-baritone Vassily Savenko has recorded a considerable number of Medtner songs with Boris Berezovsky, Alexander Blok and Victor Yampolsky. A handful of other singers have included Medtner songs in compilations; particularly notable are historic recordings by Zara Dolukhanova and Irina Arkhipova. However, many songs are not available on CD, and some await their first recording. A substantial two-CD set, presenting fifty-four Medtner songs, accompanied by Iain Burnside, has appeared in 2018.

Medtner recorded piano rolls of some of his works for Welte-Mignon in 1923 and Duo-Art in 1925, before his later studio recordings for Capitol Records and other labels.

In 2017 the Ukrainian pianist Darya Dadykina and the Russian pianist Vasily Gvozdetsky founded the International Nikolai Medtner Society in Berlin to popularize his work and to advance cultural exchange in and around Europe. In October/November 2018 the society organized the 1st International Nikolai Medtner Music Festival in Berlin, which brings together artists and musicologists to perform and discuss his work (see the festival programme ).

An asteroid called 9329 Nikolaimedtner is named after the composer.

== Publications ==
Medtner's one book, The Muse and the Fashion, being a defence of the foundations of the Art of Music (1935, reprinted 1957 and 1978) was a statement of his artistic credo and reaction to some of the trends of the time. He believed strongly that there were immutable laws to music, whose essence was in song. An English translation of the book was published in 1951 by Alfred Swan.

Medtner also wrote a memoir titled "With S.V. Rachmaninoff" in 1933, in which he writes admiringly about his friend as a composer and as a pianist.

== Print sources ==
After Medtner's death, the Mysore Foundation sponsored the publication of Medtner: A Memorial Volume, also titled Nicolas Medtner (1879–1951): A Tribute to his Art and Personality. It contains photographs and essays from his widow, friends, critics, musicians, composers, and admirers. A few of the contributors were: Alfred Swan, translator of Medtner's The Muse and the Fashion into English, Ivan Ilyin, Ernest Newman, Kaikhosru Shapurji Sorabji, Marcel Dupré, Russian music critic Leonid Sabeneev, Canadian pianist and close friend of the composer Alfred La Liberté, singers Margaret Ritchie, Tatania Makushina and Oda Slobodskaya, and Medtner himself via extracts from Muse and the Fashion. The editor of the volume was Richard Holt.

In 2004, Natalia Konsistorum published, in Russian, Nikolai Karlovich Medtner: Portrait of a Composer (ISBN 3-89487-500-3). The book is available in a German translation by Christoph Flamm and is notable for the two CDs it contains with original recordings of a variety of Medtner's works.

There have been numerous dissertations on Medtner's music. One of the most influential is Der russische Komponist Nikolaj Metner : Studien und Materialien by Christoph Flamm. Originally presented as the author's Ph.D thesis (Heidelberg, 1995), it was published by Kuhn (ISBN 3-928864-24-6, 1995, out of print). It includes letters, reviews and other documents in German, Russian, English and French, a bibliography and partial discography. Wendelin Bitzan's dissertation "The Sonata as an Ageless Principle" (Vienna, 2019, available in open access) was written under guidance from Flamm and presents in-depth analyses of Medtner's sonatas and their historical and aesthetic contexts.

In 2003, David J. Skvorak wrote a doctoral thesis Thematic unity in Nicolas Medtner's works for piano : Skazki, sonatas, and piano quintet at the University of Cincinnati, published by UMI. It contains theoretical analyses of several of Medtner's works.

== Adaptations and citations ==
Bart Berman composed Variations and Fugue based on the theme in Medtner's Theme with Variations, Op. 55 in 2009. The author Philip Pullman declared Medtner as his favourite composer during a short interview available on the BBC website in September 2011.
