= 1962 Birthday Honours =

British government recognitions

The Queen's Birthday Honours 1962 were appointments in many of the Commonwealth realms of Queen Elizabeth II to various orders and honours to reward and highlight good works by citizens of those countries. The appointments were made "on the occasion of the Celebration of Her Majesty's Birthday", and were published in supplements to the London Gazette of 25 May 1962.

At this time, honours for Australians were awarded both in the United Kingdom honours, on the advice of the premiers of Australian states, and also in a separate Australia honours list.

The recipients of honours are displayed here as they were styled before their new honour, and arranged by honour, with classes (Knight, Knight Grand Cross, etc.) and then divisions (Military, Civil, etc.) as appropriate.

== United Kingdom and Commonwealth ==
=== Viscount ===
- The Right Honourable Cyril John, Baron Radcliffe, GBE, Lord of Appeal in Ordinary since 1949. Chairman, Committee of Inquiry into the Monetary and Credit System, 1957–1959; Chairman, Committee of Inquiry into Security Procedures and Practices, 1961.

=== Baron ===
- The Right Honourable Sir William Mabane, KBE, Chairman, British Travel and Holidays Association.

=== Privy Counsellor ===
- Major Sir William John St. Clair Anstruther-Gray, Bt., MC, DL, MP, Member of Parliament for North Lanarkshire, 1931–1945, and for Berwick and East Lothian since 1951. Assistant Postmaster-General, May–July 1945. Deputy Chairman of Ways and Means, 1959–1962; Chairman of Ways and Means since January 1962.
- Brigadier Sir John George Smyth, Bt., VC, MC, MP, Member of Parliament for Norwood since 1950. Parliamentary Secretary, Ministry of Pensions, 1951–1953. Joint Parliamentary Secretary, Ministry of Pensions and National Insurance, 1953–1955.

=== Baronet ===
- Sir Frederic Collins Hooper, Managing Director, Schweppes Group of Companies. Adviser on Recruiting to Minister of Defence.
- The Right Honourable Sir Gordon Cosmo Touche, MP, Member of Parliament for Reigate, 1931–1950, and for Dorking since 1950. Deputy Chairman of Ways and Means, 1956–1959; Chairman of Ways and Means, 1959–January 1962. For political and public services.

=== Knight Bachelor ===
- Frederick William Mallandaine Ashton, CBE, Principal Choreographer and Associate Director, Royal Ballet, Covent Garden.
- Alderman George Frederick Chaplin, CBE. For political and public services in Essex.
- Edward Foyle Collingwood, CBE, Chairman, Newcastle Regional Hospital Board.
- Frederick William Delve, CBE, Chief Officer, London Fire Brigade.
- Arthur John Driver, President of The Law Society, 1961–1962.
- Theodore Fortescue Fox, MD, Editor, The Lancet.
- Alderman James Mantle Greenwood, CBE, JP. For political and public services in London.
- Charles Stuart Hallinan, CBE. For political and public services in Wales and Monmouthshire.
- George Ernest Haynes, CBE, Director, National Council of Social Service.
- John Francis Hedges, CBE. For political and public services in Wessex.
- Bernard Kenyon, Clerk of the Peace and Clerk of the County Council, West Riding of Yorkshire.
- William Errington Keville, CBE. For services to the shipping industry. Deputy Chairman, Furness, Withy & Co. Ltd.
- Anthony Highmore King, CBE, Senior Master, Queen's Bench Division and Queen's Remembrancer, Supreme Count of Judicature.
- William Halford Lawson, CBE, Senior Partner in Binder, Hamlyn & Co., Chartered Accountants.
- Edwin Hartley Cameron Leather, MP, Member of Parliament for North Somerset since 1950. For political and public services.
- John Francis Lockwood, Master of Birkbeck College, University of London. For services to higher education in the Colonies.
- David Alexander Cecil Low, Cartoonist.
- David Lowe, CBE, Deputy Chairman, Agricultural Research Council. Chairman, Scottish Horticultural Advisory Committee.
- Stephen James McAdden, CBE, MP, Member of Parliament for Southend East since 1950. For political and public services.
- Alexander Maitland, QC, DL, Trustee, National Galleries of Scotland.
- Eric Mensforth, CBE, Chairman, Westland Aircraft Ltd.
- John Turton Randall, Professor of Biophysics, University of London.
- Isaac Shoenberg. For services in the development of television and sound recording.
- Lieutenant-Colonel Thomas Eustace Smith, CBE, TD, DL, Chairman and Managing Director, Smiths Dock Company Ltd.
- Richard Felix Summers, Chairman, John Summers & Sons Ltd. Part-time Member of the Iron and Steel Board.
- William Watson, Treasurer, Bank of Scotland.

State of Victoria

- William Ian Potter, of Melbourne, State of Victoria. For public services.
- The Honourable Reginald Richard Sholl, a Judge of the Supreme Court in the State of Victoria.

State of Queensland

- Professor Fred Joyce Schonell, Vice-Chancellor of the University of the State of Queensland.

State of South Australia

- Henry Graham Alderman, a member of the legal profession in the State of South Australia. For public services.

Commonwealth Relations

- James Douglas Hardy, CBE, formerly Secretary to the Government of Pakistan, President's Secretariat at Establishment Division.
- Nicol Stenhouse, formerly President of the Bengal Chamber of Commerce and Industry and of the Associated Chambers of Commerce of India.

Overseas Territories

- Clyde Vernon Harcourt Archer, formerly Federal Justice, The West Indies.
- Bernard De Bunsen, CMG, Principal of Makerere College, The University College of East Africa.
- Charles Godfrey Gasyonga II, Omugabe (hereditary ruler) of Ankole, Uganda.
- Gerald MacMahon Mahon, Chief Justice, Zanzibar.
- Ramparsad Neerunjun, OBE, Chief Justice, Mauritius.
- George David Kamuriasi Rukidi II, Omukama (hereditary ruler) of the Toro Kingdom, Uganda.
- Arthur Frederick Thelwell, CBE, Chairman, Christiana Area Land Authority, Jamaica.

=== Order of the Bath ===
==== Knight Grand Cross of the Order of the Bath (GCB) ====
Military Division

- Admiral Sir Alexander Noel Campbell Bingley, KCB, OBE.
- General Sir Gerald Lathbury, KCB, DSO, MBE, ADC (Gen.), (34834), late Infantry; Colonel, The West India Regiment; Colonel Commandant, 1st Greenjackets, 43rd & 52nd; Colonel Commandant, The Parachute Regiment.

Civil Division

- Sir Henry Drummond Hancock, KCB, KBE, CMG, Chairman, Local Government Commission (England).

==== Knight Commander of the Order of the Bath (KCB) ====
Military Division

- Vice-Admiral Nigel Stuart Henderson, CB, OBE.
- Vice-Admiral John Michael Villiers, CB, OBE.
- Lieutenant-General John Winthrop Hackett, CB, CBE, DSO, MC, (52752), late Royal Armoured Corps; Colonel Commandant, Corps of Royal Electrical and Mechanical Engineers.
- Lieutenant-General Reginald Hackett Hewetson, CB, CBE, DSO, (40386), late Royal Regiment of Artillery.
- Acting Air Marshal Leslie William Clement Bower, CB, DSO, DFC, Royal Air Force.

Civil Division

- George Edward Godber, CB, DM, FRCP, Chief Medical Officer, Ministry of Health, Ministry of Education and Home Office.
- Burke St. John Trend, CB, CVO, Second Secretary, HM Treasury.
- Brigadier The Right Honourable Charles George Vivian, Baron Tryon, KCVO, DSO, Keeper of the Privy Purse and Treasurer to The Queen.

==== Companion of the Order of the Bath (CB) ====
Military Division

Royal Navy

- Rear-Admiral Ian Gerald Aylen, OBE, DSC.
- Rear-Admiral Joseph Charles Cameron Henley.
- Rear-Admiral John Augustine Ievers, OBE.
- Rear-Admiral Edmund George Irving, OBE.
- Rear-Admiral William James Munn, DSO, OBE.
- Rear-Admiral Simon Edward Post, OBE.
- Surgeon Rear-Admiral John Mansel Reese, OBE, QHP, MRCS, LRCP.
- Rear-Admiral Maurice James Ross, DSC.
- Rear-Admiral Godfrey Benjamin Teale, CBE.

Army

- Major-General Ian Herbert Fitzgerald Boyd, CBE, (38385), late Corps of Royal Engineers.
- Major-General John Hamilton Cubbon, CBE, (52600), late Infantry.
- Major-General Thomas Herbert Fischer Foulkes, OBE, (39248), late Corps of Royal Engineers.
- Major-General Charles Harold McVittie, CBE, (40716), Royal Army Ordnance Corps.
- Major-General William James Officer, CBE, QHS, MB, (21400), late Royal Army Medical Corps.
- Major-General Joseph Kenneth Shepheard, DSO, OBE, (40410), late Corps of Royal Engineers.
- Major-General Patrick George Turpin, OBE, (63806), late Royal Army Service Corps.
- Major-General Gerald Patrick Linton Weston, CBE, DSO, (49963), late Infantry.

Royal Air Force

- Air Vice-Marshal Kenneth Vernon Garside, DFC.
- Air Vice-Marshal Thomas Conchar Macdonald, AFC, QHP, MD, ChB.
- Acting Air Vice-Marshal Colin Murray Stewart, CBE.
- Acting Air Vice-Marshal George Holford White, CBE.
- Air Commodore Charles Beresford Eaton Burt-Andrews, CBE.
- Air Commodore Arthur Hubert McMath Hely, OBE.
- Air Commodore John Kevitt Rotherham, CBE.

Civil Division

- Philip Stuart Milner-Barry, OBE, Under-Secretary, HM Treasury.
- Gordon Bowen, CMG, Under-Secretary, Board of Trade.
- Reginald Geoffrey Elkington, Director of Establishment and Finance, Department of Scientific and Industrial Research.
- Arthur Acheson Farrell, Comptroller and Auditor General, Northern Ireland.
- William Geraghty, Deputy Under-Secretary of State, War Office.
- Ronald Ernest Charles Johnson, Under-Secretary, Scottish Home and Health Department.
- Kenneth Roy Johnstone, CMG, Deputy Director-General, British Council.
- Brigadier Charles Ardagh Langley, CBE, MC, Chief Inspecting Officer of Railways, Ministry of Transport.
- Wynne Llewelyn Lloyd, HM Inspector of Schools (Chief Inspector, Wales), Ministry of Education.
- Thomas Warburton McCullough, OBE, HM Chief Inspector of Factories, Ministry of Labour.
- Edward Somerville McNairn, Commissioner and Secretary, Board of Inland Revenue.
- Colin Hope Spens, Chief Engineer, Ministry of Housing and Local Government.
- Arthur Wallace Stableforth, Director, Veterinary Laboratories, Weybridge, Ministry of Agriculture, Fisheries and Food.
- Robert William Button, OBE, Superintendent, Services Electronic Research Laboratory, Admiralty.
- Frederick Thomas Tarry, CBE, MM, HM Inspector of Constabulary, Home Office.

=== Order of Saint Michael and Saint George ===
==== Knight Commander of the Order of St Michael and St George (KCMG) ====
- Lieutenant-General Sir Edric Montague Bastyan, KBE, CB, Governor of the State of South Australia.
- Lieutenant-General Sir William Pasfield Oliver, KCB, OBE, British High Commissioner in the Commonwealth of Australia.
- John Warburton Paul, OBE, MC, Governor and Commander-in-Chief, Gambia.
- David Clive Crosbie Trench, CMG, MC, High Commissioner, Western Pacific.
- The Honourable Con Douglas Walter O'Neill, CMG, Her Majesty's Ambassador Extra-ordinary and Plenipotentiary in Helsinki.
- Sir Horace Anthony Claude Rumbold, Bt., CB, CMG, Minister, Her Majesty's Embassy, Paris.
- Francis Aimé Vallat, CMG, QC, Legal Adviser, Foreign Office.

==== Companion of the Order of St Michael and St George (CMG) ====
- Geoffrey Howard Herridge, Managing Director, Iraq Petroleum Company Ltd.
- John Collier Frederick Hopkins, Director, Commonwealth Mycological Institute.
- Donald Rhind, OBE, Adviser on Agricultural Research, Department of Technical Co-operation.
- Leslie Thomas Douglas Williams, Director General, Defence Research Staff, British Defence Staffs, (Washington). Now Director General of Atomic Weapons, Ministry of Aviation.
- James Percival Ainslie, MD, FRCS, a prominent surgeon in the State of Western Australia.
- Leonard Brian Walsh Atkins, CVO, an Assistant Secretary in the Commonwealth Relations Office.
- Robert William Doughty Fowler, Deputy British High Commissioner in Canada.
- Donald Bernard Waters Good, Judge of Appeal, Court of Appeal, Supreme Court, Federation of Malaya.
- Vivian Edgar Hancock, of Indooroopilly, Brisbane, State of Queensland. For philanthropic services.
- Louis King, Under-Secretary, Secretary, Minister of Health, and Clerk of Executive Council, State of South Australia.
- Robert Casley Normand, MM, Director of Statutory Consolidation, State of Victoria.
- Edward Taylor Williams, formerly Railway Adviser, Malayan Railway Administration, Kuala Lumpur.
- Thomas Davidson Thomson, OBE, Commissioner for Social Development, Nyasaland.
- Peter William Youens, OBE, Deputy Chief Secretary, Nyasaland.
- Allan Rose Abrahams, Permanent Secretary, Ministry of Communications and Works, Jamaica.
- Jack Jesson Adie, Permanent Secretary, Kenya.
- Caleb William Davies, MRCS, LRCP, Permanent Secretary and Chief Medical Officer, Ministry of Health, Uganda.
- Denis Whitfield Hall, Provincial Commissioner, Kenya.
- Allan Inglis, Director of Public Works, Hong Kong.
- Michael Somervillle Porcher, OBE, Chief Secretary, British Honduras.
- Philip Robert Stephenson, OBE, lately Director, Desert Locust Survey, East African Common Services Organisation.
- Joseph Walter Sykes, CVO, Colonial Secretary, Bermuda.
- Ian Graham Turbott, Administrator, Antigua.
- Geoffrey Hunter Baker, Counsellor, United Kingdom Delegation to the European Free Trade Association and to the General Agreement on Tariffs and Trade, Geneva.
- Lieutenant-Colonel Charles Neil Molesworth Blair, OBE, Foreign Office.
- John Fenwick Brewis, CVO, Foreign Office.
- Willis Ide Combs, Counsellor (Commercial), Her Majesty's Embassy, Baghdad.
- John Mortimer Fisher, Foreign Office.
- George Francois Hiller, DSO, Foreign Office.
- Leonard James Hooper, CBE, Deputy Director, Government Communications Headquarters.
- Gordon Noel Jackson, MBE, Counsellor and Consul-General, Her Majesty's Embassy in Libya, Benghazi.
- Richard Thomas Davenport Ledward, Counsellor, Her Majesty's Embassy, Washington.
- Richard Mercer Keene Slater, lately Counsellor, Her Majesty's Embassy, Rangoon.
- John Richard Wraight, Counsellor (Commercial), Her Majesty's Embassy, Cairo.

=== Royal Victorian Order ===
==== Dame Commander of the Royal Victorian Order (DCVO) ====
- Dorothy May Vaisey, OBE.

==== Knight Commander of the Royal Victorian Order (KCVO) ====
- Major-General Walter Arthur George Burns, CB, DSO, OBE, MC.
- Lieutenant-Colonel the Honourable Martin Michael Charles Charteris, CB, MVO, OBE.
- Air Vice-Marshal Sir John Walter Cordingley, KCB, CBE.
- Major-General Ivor Thomas Percival Hughes, CB, CBE, DSO, MC.
- Patrick Graham Toler Kingsley, CVO.
- Captain Humphrey Clifford Lloyd, CVO, MC.

==== Commander of the Royal Victorian Order (CVO) ====
- Francis Peter Beck.
- Arthur George Linfield, CBE, JP.
- Frank Sykes.
- Colonel Arthur Edwin Young, CMG.

==== Member of the Royal Victorian Order (MVO) ====
At this time the two lowest classes of the Royal Victorian Order were "Member (fourth class)" and "Member (fifth class)", both with post-nominal letters MVO. "Member (fourth class)" was renamed "Lieutenant" (LVO) from the 1985 New Year Honours onwards.

Fourth Class

- Lieutenant-Colonel Percy Lester Binns.
- Commander Robert Anthony Clarkson, Royal Navy.
- John Gilbert Cook, CBE.
- Surgeon Commander David Geoffrey Dalgliesh, OBE, MRCS, LRCP, Royal Navy.
- Basil Montagu Phillips, MRCS, LRCP.
- Philip Louis Karl Schwabé.
- Emanuel Snowman, OBE.
- Charles Love Strong, MCSP.
- Thomas Weir, MBE, JP.
- Captain Andrew Vavasour Scott Yates, Royal Navy.

Fifth Class

- Herbert Charles Thomas Battcock.
- Margaret Geraldine Cousland.
- George Edward Hill.
- Norah Dillon Mulholland.
- Adrian Vincent Pelly.
- David Stevenson.

=== Order of the British Empire ===
==== Knight Grand Cross of the Order of the British Empire (GBE) ====
Civil Division

- Sir Oscar Charles Morland, KCMG, Her Majesty's Ambassador Extraordinary and Plenipotentiary in Tokyo.

==== Dame Commander of the Order of the British Empire (DBE) ====
Civil Division

- Beatrice Anne Godwin, OBE, Chairman, General Council of the Trades Union Congress. General Secretary, Clerical and Administrative Workers' Union.
- Jean Roberts, JP, Lord Provost of Glasgow.
- Eva Turner, Singer.

==== Knight Commander of the Order of the British Empire (KBE) ====
Military Division

Royal Navy

- Vice-Admiral Hector Charles Donald Maclean, CB, DSC.
- Surgeon Vice-Admiral William Robert Silvester Panckridge, CB, QHP, MRCS, LRCP.

Army

- Lieutenant-General William Francis Robert Turner, CB, DSO, (39501), late Infantry; Colonel, The King's Own Scottish Borderers.

Royal Air Force

- Acting Air Marshal John Darcy Baker-Carr, CB, CBE, AFC.
- Acting Air Marshal Maurice Lionel Heath, CB, OBE.

Civil Division

- Kenneth Anderson, CB, CBE, Deputy Director General and Comptroller and Accountant General, General Post Office.
- Sir Charles Robert Harington, Director, National Institute for Medical Research.
- Sir Frank Lord, OBE, JP. For political and public services in the North-West of England.
- David Philip Walsh, CB, Deputy Secretary, Ministry of Housing and Local Government.
- Michael Cavenagh Gillett, CMG, Her Majesty's Ambassador Extraordinary and Plenipotentiary in Kabul.
- The Honourable Baden Pattinson, Minister of Education, State of South Australia.
- The Honourable Sir Arthur George Warner, Minister of Transport, State of Victoria.
- Eric Newton Griffith-Jones, CMG, QC, Deputy Governor, Kenya.

==== Commander of the Order of the British Empire (CBE) ====
Military Division

Royal Navy

- Captain Leslie Bomford.
- Captain Thomas William Erskine Dommett, ADC.
- Captain Archibald George Forman, DSC, (Retired) (formerly serving with the Ghana Navy).
- Surgeon Captain William John Forbes Guild, QHS, MD, FRCS.
- Captain David Walter Kirke, OBE, (formerly on loan to the Indian Navy).
- Commodore Richard Lovatt Haslam Marsh, DSO.
- Captain Adrian Paul Wilbraham Northey, DSC, (formerly on loan to the Pakistan Navy).
- Captain Herbert Geraint Trewby Padfield.
- Captain Edmund Nicholas Poland.
- Captain Alfred Lionel Tapper, (Retired).

Army

- Colonel Donal Maurice Ahern, DSO, MB, (56530), late Royal Army Medical Corps.
- Brigadier William Allan Campbell Anderson, DSO, (52560), late Royal Armoured Corps (now R.A.R.O.).
- Brigadier Michael Worthington Biggs, OBE, (52556), late Corps of Royal Engineers.
- Brigadier William Douglas Elmes Brown, DSO, OBE, (62507), late Royal Regiment of Artillery.
- Colonel Donald Charles Cameron (50834), late Corps of Royal Engineers.
- Brigadier Basil Oscar Paul Eugster, DSO, OBE, MC, (65413), late Foot Guards.
- Brigadier (temporary) Alfred Lockwood Gadd, OBE, (175770), Royal Army Educational Corps.
- Brigadier Michael William Henry Head, OBE, (58030), late Royal Regiment of Artillery.
- Colonel Philip Charles Skene Heidenstam, OBE, (63591), late Infantry.
- Brigadier Henry Anthony Lascelles, DSO, OBE, (52026), late Royal Armoured Corps.
- The Reverend Norman MacLean, OBE, QHC, Chaplain to the Forces, First Class (62401), Royal Army Chaplains' Department.
- Brigadier Michael Whitworth Prynne, OBE, (50836), late Corps of Royal Engineers.
- Brigadier John Alexander Samuel (175322), Corps of Royal Electrical and Mechanical Engineers (now R.A.R.O.).
- Colonel George Henry Thomas Shrimpton, TD, (62356), Army Emergency Reserve.

Royal Air Force

- Air Commodore Jeaffreson Herbert Greswell, DSO, OBE, DFC.
- Air Commodore Graham Reese Magill, OBE, DFC.
- Acting Air Commodore James Douglas Ronald, AFC.
- Acting Air Commodore Leonard Howard Snelling, AFC.
- Group Captain John Owen Barnard, OBE.
- Group Captain Alan Donald Frank, DSO, DFC.
- Group Captain Herbert Sullivan, Royal Air Force Regiment.
- Group Captain James Douglas Warne, DSO, DFC.
- Group Captain Gerald Bernard Warner, DFC, AFC.
- Group Captain Kenneth Burnett Shelton Willder, OBE.
- Group Captain Antony Sinclair Woodgate.

Civil Division

- Kenneth Adam, Director, Television Broadcasting, British Broadcasting Corporation.
- Wilfrid Greenhouse Allt, Principal, Trinity College of Music.
- John Mark Archer, Chairman, Scottish Savings Committee.
- May Deans, Lady Baird, MB, ChB, Chairman, North-Eastern Regional Hospital Board, Scotland.
- William Macdonald Ballantine, MVO, Director, Scottish Information Office.
- Frederick Donal Barry, Assistant Director, Department of the Director of Public Prosecutions.
- Frederick William Beney, QC. For services to the Bar.
- Alfred Charles Best, OBE, Chief Scientific Officer, Meteorological Office, Air Ministry.
- Frederick Cyrus Braby, MC, DL, Chairman, Industrial Coal Consumers Council.
- Leonard George Burleigh, Chairman, Transport Users' Consultative Committee for the London Association.
- Alexander Lynn Bushnell, County Clerk and Treasurer of Perth and of the Joint County of Perth and Kinross.
- Dennis Hilliar Chaddock, Principal Superintendent, Royal Armament Research and Development Establishment, War Office.
- Ronald Pestell Challacombe, JP, Headmaster, Taunton's School, Southampton.
- Major Geoffrey Henry Barrington Chance. For political and public services in Wiltshire.
- Ernest Meredyth Hyde-Clarke, MBE, Director, Overseas Employers' Federation.
- William Lewis Clarke, Member, Employers' Panel of the Industrial Court; Member, Council of British Employers' Confederation.
- Edward Reginald Geoffrey Corn, Chairman and Managing Director, Richards Tiles Ltd., Stoke-on-Trent.
- Hilda Marie Travers Crabbe, JP, Principal, I.M. Marsh College of Physical Education, Liverpool.
- Macdonald Critchley, MD, FRCP, Senior Physician, National Hospital for Nervous Diseases.
- John Musgrove Curry, Assistant Chief Architect, Ministry of Works.
- Violet Anne Ruth Dance. For political and public services in the West Midlands.
- Le Roy Leveson Laurent Joseph de Maistre, Painter.
- James Drake, County Surveyor, and Bridgemaster of Lancashire.
- The Right Honourable Charles Arthur Uryan, Baron Dynevor, MC, JP, DL. For political services in London.
- Edwin Herbert Edlin, OBE, Deputy Director of Finance, Ministry of Transport.
- Frederick David Edwards, Managing Director, Edwards High Vacuum Ltd., Crawley, Sussex.
- Francis Charles Fraser, Keeper of Zoology, British Museum (Natural History).
- Alastair Campbell Frazer, MD, Professor of Medical Biochemistry and Pharmacology, University of Birmingham.
- George Frederick Gibberd, FRCS, FRCOG, Gynaecologist and Obstetrician, Guy's and Queen Charlotte's Hospitals.
- Alfred Ronald Dashwood Gilbey. For political and public services in London.
- Joseph Forsyth Gimson. For political services in Worcester.
- The Right Honourable Herbert Stuart, Baron Hampton, DSO. For political and public services.
- George Francis Burton Harvey, Chairman and Joint Managing Director, British Ropeway Engineering Co., Ltd.
- William Hayhurst, City Treasurer of Westminster.
- Bernard Ashley Hill, OBE, attached War Office.
- Dudley Alfred Hole, Deputy Director, Agricultural Land Service, Ministry of Agriculture, Fisheries and Food.
- Alderman Oliver Spencer Holmes, JP. For political and public services in Sheffield.
- Alan Barr Howie, Chairman, Northumberland County Agricultural Executive Committee.
- Alderman Joseph Hoy, MBE, BEM, JP, DL. For public services, including services to the Police.
- Elspeth Josceline Huxley, JP, Writer.
- Captain Cecil Davis Jackman, MBE, Chief Commandant, Metropolitan Special Constabulary.
- Robert White Johnson, Chairman and Managing Director, Cammell Laird & Co. (Shipbuilders & Engineers) Ltd., Birkenhead.
- Eric Kyffin Jones, MBE, Chairman, Welsh Board of Health.
- Geoffrey Edward Logsdon, TD. For services to the administration of Charities.
- Ernest Long, Member of the Central Electricity Generating Board and of the Electricity Council.
- Alderman Harry Lord, MBE, JP. For political and public services in Lancashire.
- William John Luxton, Secretary, London Chamber of Commerce.
- Kenneth Gordon McNeil, JP, Representative on the Claims Commission, War Office, of the Committee of Lloyd's.
- James Ernest Makin, Assistant Secretary, Admiralty.
- Clare Helen, Lady Mann, OBE. For political services in Norfolk.
- Thaddeus Robert Rudolph Mann, MD, Director, Agricultural Research Council Unit of Reproductive Physiology and Biochemistry, Cambridge.
- John Leslie May, Assistant Secretary, Board of Trade.
- John Mayer, Chairman and Joint Managing Director, International Combustion (Holdings) Ltd.
- Norman Joseph Lane Megson, Director of Materials, Research and Development, Ministry of Aviation.
- William John Miller, General Manager, Scottish Factories, Rolls-Royce Ltd.
- Edward Victor Mills, JP, Alderman, Kent County Council.
- Douglas Henry Mizen, Senior Superintendent, Royal Ordnance Factory, Woolwich.
- Roy Moore. For services to the Air Training Corps and the Royal Air Force.
- Herbert Edward Morgan, Principal Executive Officer, Ministry of Pensions and National Insurance.
- Edward George Neate, OBE. For services to the Boy Scouts Association.
- Sidney Thomas Mayow Newman, Reid Professor of Music, University of Edinburgh.
- John Dudley North, Chairman and Managing Director, Boulton Paul Aircraft Ltd., Wolverhampton.
- Muriel Betty Powell, Matron, St. George's Hospital, London.
- Robert Press, Deputy Chief Scientific Officer, Ministry of Defence.
- Hugo Ernest Gildart Read, JP, Past President, Chartered Land Agents' Society.
- Paul Lennox Rex, OBE, Chief Passport Officer, Foreign Office.
- Robert Alun Roberts, Member, Welsh Agricultural Land Sub-Commission.
- John Monteath Robertson, Gardiner Professor of Chemistry, University of Glasgow.
- Hume Boggis-Rolfe, Assistant Solicitor, Lord Chancellor's Office.
- Percy William Rowe, Director of Audit, Exchequer and Audit Department.
- Theodore Burton Fox Ruoff, Senior Registrar, HM Land Registry.
- William Patterson Russell, MBE. For political and public services in the West of Scotland.
- Margaret Alice Shepherd. For political services.
- Frank Augustus Small, JP, Alderman, Nottinghamshire County Council.
- Stephen Harold Spender, Poet and Critic.
- Captain Thomas Wilson Stevens, RD, Commodore master, MV Aragon, Royal Mail Lines Ltd., London.
- Andrew Stewart, Director and General Manager, Huddersfield Building Society.
- Leslie John Taylor, lately Director, South Western Region, Bristol, General Post Office.
- Robert Adolphus George Tilney, DSO, TD, DL. For political services in Leicestershire and Nottinghamshire.
- Colonel Gerald Joseph Underwood, TD. DL, Chairman, Territorial and Auxiliary Forces Association, Derbyshire.
- Thomas Leslie Viney, Director (Works & Buildings), Engineering Group, United Kingdom Atomic Energy Authority.
- James Hunter Walker, Senior Principal Inspector, Board of Inland Revenue.
- Colonel Rowland Ward, MC, TD, MRCS, LRCP. For political and public services in Devon.
- John Leask Warrander, Assistant Secretary, Ministry of Power.
- George Emlyn Williams, Playwright and Actor.
- John Douglas Woodruff, Chairman, the Tablet Publishing Company.
- Lieutenant-Colonel Clifford Stanley Woodward, OBE, JP, DL, Chairman, Bridgend Disablement Advisory Committee.
- Joseph Houston Wright, MD, FRCP(Ed.), JP, Consultant Physician and Cardiologist, Glasgow.
- Francis Reginald Stevens Yorke, Architect.
- Thomas Tucker Edwardes Cadett, OBE, British Broadcasting Corporation Correspondent in Paris.
- Ronald Dudley Farrington, OBE, British subject resident in Iran.
- Alexander Herbert Faulkner, The Daily Telegraph Correspondent in New York.
- Colonel Alfred Hastings St. George Hamersley, MC, Lately Commandant of Police, Bahrain.
- Ian Clayton Mackenzie, Counsellor (Commercial), Her Majesty's Embassy, Caracas.
- Robert Morton Saner, OBE, Counsellor, Her Majesty's Embassy, Buenos Aires.
- James Collett Wardrop, Her Majesty's Consul-General, Luanda.
- Ronald George Henry Watts, Her Majesty's Consul-General, Osaka.
- Cyril Whitworth, MBE, Counsellor (Administration), Her Majesty's Embassy, Bonn.
- Edward William Adams, Town Clerk of the City of Sydney, State of New South Wales.
- Willis Henry Connolly, Chairman of the Electricity Commission, State of Victoria.
- Arthur Denning, Commissioner in New York for the State of New South Wales.
- The Honourable William McCulloch Gollan, Member of the Legislative Assembly, 1941–1962, and of the Executive Council, 1954–1959, in the State of New South Wales.
- Mabel Louise, Lady Grimwade. For philanthropic services in the State of Victoria.
- Brigadier William Henry Hall, DSO, ED, Comptroller of Stores, Electricity Commission, State of Victoria; Chief Marshal, Anzac Day Commemoration March and Ceremony since 1955.
- Malcolm Stewart Joyner, ED, a member of the dental profession in the State of South Australia.
- Leslie John Jarvis Nye, MB, ChM, of Brisbane, State of Queensland; in recognition of his medical and humanitarian activities.
- Frank Marshall Smith, formerly Acting Secretary, Ministry of Internal Security, Federation of Malaya.
- Francis Eric Taylor, OBE, formerly Principal Secretary, Development Secretariat, Ghana.
- James White Young, formerly Director of Works, Public Works Department, State of Western Australia.
- William George Bawden, OBE, Head of Shipping Department, Crown Agents for Oversea Governments and Administrations.
- Clifford Spencer-Cooke, Commissioner for Labour and Welfare, Aden.
- Alfred John Ernest Davis, OBE, Representative in North America of the Crown Agents for Oversea Governments and Administrations.
- James Alexander Donald, JP. For public services in Singapore.
- Douglas Valmore Fletcher. For public services in Jamaica.
- Herbert Edward Owen Hughes, OBE, Establishment Secretary, Uganda.
- James McFarlane Kesson, Chief Engineer, East African Railways & Harbours.
- Kwok Chan, OBE. For public services in Hong Kong.
- Daniel Richard Lascelles, lately Puisne Judge, Sarawak.
- Yekoniya Kaira Lubogo. For public services in Uganda.
- Lionel Alfred Luckhoo, QC. For public services in British Guiana.
- James Wlson Macmillan, OBE, JP, Minister of Education, Health and Housing, British Honduras.
- Louis Anselm Halsey McShine, MB, FRCS(Ed.), Specialist Medical Officer, Trinidad.
- Ernest Deighton Mottley. For public services in Barbados.
- Robert Munro. For public services in Fiji.
- Leonard Francis Taylor, Assistant Postmaster-General (Engineering), East African Posts and Telecommunications Administration.
- Gavin Brown Thomson, MBE, General Manager, Transport & Harbours Department, British Guiana.
- Harold Travis. For public services in Kenya.

Southern Rhodesia

- Cecil Leander Honey, CBE, Secretary for Labour, Social Welfare and Housing.

==== Officer of the Order of the British Empire (OBE) ====
Military Division

Royal Navy

- Commander Frederick William George Bartlett.
- Commander William Frederick James Brading.
- Commander Robert Bruce Chandler, (Retired).
- Commander (Sp.) Frank Henry Humphris, VRD, Royal Naval Reserve.
- Surgeon Commander (D) John Hunter, LDS.
- Commander John Edward Ironmonger, (Retired).
- Senior Master James Jolly, Royal Fleet Auxiliary Service.
- Commander Robert Law Kirby.
- Chief Officer Ethel Gwendoline Lucas, Women's Royal Naval Service.
- Commander Douglas Edmund Payne.
- Commander Walter Scott, DSC.
- Commander Keith Ivan Short, DSC.
- Commander Anthony Vyvyan Thomas, (Retired).
- Instructor Commander Henry George Tidy.
- Lieutenant-Commander Jeremy Charles Ellenthorpe White.
- The Reverend Alwyn Lumley Wragg, Chaplain.

Army

- Lieutenant-Colonel Thomas Douglas Bailey, TD, (302660), Corps of Royal Engineers, Territorial Army (now T.A.R.O.).
- Lieutenant-Colonel (acting) William Montgomery Bigham (374869), Combined Cadet Force.
- Lieutenant-Colonel Norman Harold Bryan, TD, (130852), The Prince of Wales's Own Regiment of Yorkshire, Territorial Army.
- Lieutenant-Colonel (temporary) Ronald Wallace Challenor (229234), Royal Army Service Corps.
- Lieutenant-Colonel Peter Thurlow Champness, TD, (129102), Royal Regiment of Artillery, Territorial Army (now T.A.R.O.).
- Lieutenant-Colonel Richard Norman Collins, TD, (130515), The Royal Inniskilling Fusiliers, Territorial Army (now T.A.R.O.).
- Lieutenant-Colonel Francis Henderson Coutts, MBE, (193742), The King's Own Scottish Borderers.
- Lieutenant-Colonel James Wright Anderton Crabtree, MB, (246294), Royal Army Medical Corps, Territorial Army.
- Lieutenant-Colonel Raymond Frederick Discombe, MBE, (105922), Royal Army Service Corps.
- Lieutenant-Colonel Donald Douglas Fairman (174647), Royal Corps of Signals.
- Lieutenant-Colonel Anthony Denys Firth, MBE, MC, (85646). The Duke of Wellington's Regiment (West Riding).
- Lieutenant-Colonel (acting) Arthur Strickland Griffiths, TD, (178185), Combined Cadet Force.
- Lieutenant-Colonel Kenneth Hall, MBE, (158244), Royal Army Educational Corps.
- Lieutenant-Colonel (now Colonel (temporary)) Peter Alexander Tollemache Halliday (73143), Intelligence Corps.
- Lieutenant-Colonel Jack Wentworth Harman, MC, (123536), 1st The Queen's Dragoon Guards, Royal Armoured Corps.
- Lieutenant-Colonel Douglas Edgar Harris (129890), The Devonshire and Dorset Regiment.
- Lieutenant-Colonel John Vivian Hawkins (63624), The York and Lancaster Regiment (now R.A.R.O.).
- Lieutenant-Colonel William Henry Johns, MBE, (265762), Corps of Royal Engineers.
- Lieutenant-Colonel Richard Benjamin Kenney, (380619), 7th Duke of Edinburgh's Own Gurkha Rifles.
- Lieutenant-Colonel (District Officer) Benjamin George Marsh (225659), Royal Regiment of Artillery.
- Lieutenant-Colonel (now Colonel (temporary)) John Seymour Mennell, MBE, TD, (73379), Royal Tank Regiment, Royal Armoured Corps (Employed List 1).
- Lieutenant-Colonel Eric William Milner, TD, (182124), Royal Corps of Signals, Territorial Army.
- Lieutenant-Colonel (now Colonel (temporary)) Jack Roynon Piddington, MC, (200034), Royal Corps of Signals.
- Lieutenant-Colonel (Director of Music) Douglas Alexander Pope (329654), Coldstream Guards.
- Lieutenant-Colonel John Disney Sale (73165), The King's Shropshire Light Infantry.
- Lieutenant-Colonel William Edwin Samuel Sturgeon (108210), The Royal Ulster Rifles.
- Lieutenant-Colonel Godfrey Zammit Tabona, (67298), Royal Malta Artillery.
- Lieutenant-Colonel Dennis Walton, MC, TD, (179964), Royal Regiment of Artillery, Territorial Army.
- Lieutenant-Colonel Peter Drake-Wilkes (113869), Corps of Royal Engineers.
- Lieutenant-Colonel Michael McClure Williams (66030), Royal Regiment of Artillery.
- Lieutenant-Colonel Allan Elton Younger, DSO, (85568), Corps of Royal Engineers.
- Lieutenant-Colonel Desmond Anthony Edward Carter (77545), Royal Regiment of Artillery; formerly on loan to the Government of Pakistan.
- Lieutenant-Colonel Richard Owen Girdlestone (72782), Corps of Royal Electrical and Mechanical Engineers; on loan to the Government of the Federation of Malaya.
- Lieutenant-Colonel Robert de Lisle King (67150), The Royal Sussex Regiment (Employed List 1); formerly on loan to the Government of the Federation of Malaya.
- Lieutenant-Colonel Henry Miller Boulton, MC, ED, (5183), Commanding Officer, 2nd Battalion, Fiji Infantry Regiment.
- Lieutenant-Colonel Thomas John Jackson, DSO, (68091), Commanding Officer, 1st Battalion, Singapore Infantry Regiment.

Royal Air Force

- Wing Commander Victor Ernest George Alton (102203), RAF Regiment.
- Wing Commander Denis Glanville Beal (50638).
- Wing Officer Elizabeth Mary Benson (5777), Women's Royal Air Force.
- Wing Commander Ernest John Booker, MM, (51689).
- Wing Commander Norman Sheldon Charlton Chapman (43829).
- Wing Commander Phillip Douglass Cherry, DFC, DFM, (48053).
- Wing Commander Roy Hartley Crompton (181248).
- Wing Commander Norman Frank Curtis (53115).
- Wing Commander Edwin Hall King (41933).
- Wing Commander Kenneth Robert Manns (170979).
- Wing Commander Charles William McNab Newman, DFC, (33347).
- Wing Commander Henry Alfred James Steedman (51578).
- Wing Commander William Allan Thynne, DFC, MM, BEM, (129528).
- Wing Commander George William Wray Waddington, DFC, (53427).
- Wing Commander Patrick Percival Walker (56567).
- Wing Commander Ivan Whittaker, DFC, (51704).
- Acting Wing Commander Edward Athol Haighton (100303), Royal Air Force Volunteer Reserve (Training Branch).
- Acting Wing Commander Bernard Llewellyn Middleton, MBE, (66938), Royal Air Force Volunteer Reserve (Training Branch).
- Squadron Leader Peter Frederick Reed (150178).
- Squadron Leader Leonard Arthur Walker (59057).

Civil Division

- Estelle Inez Ommanney Adamson, Matron, Western General Hospital, Edinburgh.
- Kenneth Richard Allen, lately British Trade Commissioner in Queensland, Australia.
- Alderman Walter Ralph Amphlett, Chairman, Worcester City and County Fire Brigade Committee.
- Wilfrid Robert Amys, Chief Executive Officer, Foreign Office.
- Alan Mackay Anderson. For political and public services in Renfrewshire.
- Alfred Thomas Anderson, Technical Class, Grade A, Admiralty.
- Noel Atherton, Chief Civil Hydrographic Officer and Assistant Superintendent of Charts, Admiralty.
- George Anthony Atkinson, Superintending Architect, Building Research Station, Department of Scientific and Industrial Research.
- Frank Axon, DCM, lately Chief Engineer, External Services, British Broadcasting Corporation.
- Frederick Walter Bailey, Senior Inspector of Taxes, Board of Inland Revenue.
- John Ralph Baker, MB, ChB, General Practitioner, Winterton, Scunthorpe, Lincolnshire.
- Thomas Gustave Barman, Diplomatic Correspondent, British Broadcasting Corporation.
- Cyril William Beaumont. For services to Dancing.
- Stanley Herbert Bennett, Clerk, Surrey Executive Council.
- The Reverend Canon Edward Monier Bickersteth, Vice-Chairman of Council, The Missions to Seamen.
- Cecil Patrick Black, Principal Officer, Ministry of Labour and National Insurance for Northern Ireland.
- Harry Blech. For services to Music.
- Ernest Henry Bolton, MBE, Principal, Ministry of Housing and Local Government.
- Herbert Brabin, JP. For political services.
- Alderman Charles Raymond Broster, DCM, MM, Chairman, Cheshire Agricultural Society.
- Alexander Brown, MB, ChB, General Practitioner, Linton, Cambridgeshire.
- Alderman Harry Reuben Buck, JP, Vice-Chairman, West Suffolk County Council.
- Robert Rupert Gibson Cameron, Director and Naval Architect, Harland & Wolff Ltd., Belfast.
- Robert Edward Issott Carlyle, JP, Managing Director, Robert Carlyle & Co. Ltd., Manchester.
- George Carmichael, MBE, Chief Executive Officer, Ministry of Agriculture, Fisheries and Food.
- Alfred John Charge, MBE, Assistant Keeper, Grade I, Imperial War Museum.
- Maurice Arthur Cheshire, HM Principal Inspector of Quarries, Ministry of Power.
- Ernest Philip Clacey, Higher Collector, London Central, Board of Customs and Excise.
- Joseph William Clark, Alderman, Burton-upon-Trent County Borough Council.
- William Henry Grossman, MBE, BEM, JP, Member, Air Cadet Council.
- Richard James Seymour Curtis, Honorary Secretary, Public Relations Committee, Incorporated Association of Preparatory Schools.
- Alexander Whyte Davidson, MC, ERD, MB, FRCS(Ed.), Senior Medical Officer, Ministry of Health.
- Norman Eilian Davies, Senior Chief Executive Officer, Air Ministry.
- Henry Gordon Dean, Telephone Manager, Exeter, General Post Office.
- William Richard Dean, Chief Executive Officer, Ministry of Pensions and National Insurance.
- Morris Dodderidge, Director, Recruitment Department, British Council.
- Eric Arthur Gerald Duffey, East Anglian Regional Officer, Nature Conservancy.
- Bewsey Bennett Dyke, JP, Chairman, Weymouth, Dorset, Disablement Advisory Committee.
- Alderman Thomas Christopher Eaton, TD, Chairman, Norwich War Pensions Committee.
- Joseph Stanley Ellis, Chief Information Officer (B), Commonwealth Relations Office.
- Captain William Swann Eustance, Master, MV Tactician, Thos. & Jas. Harrison, Ltd., Liverpool.
- William Henry Fairley, JP. For political and public services in County Armagh.
- Eric William Fenby. For services to Music.
- William John Charles Fenton, MRCS, LRCP, JP, General Practitioner, Barking, Essex.
- William Ferris, JP, Member of the Scottish Tourist Board.
- Captain Walter Wortley Flatt, MC, Chairman, East Suffolk and Norfolk River Board.
- David Forbes, Senior Engineer, Ministry of Works.
- Commander Frederick Middleton Fox, AFC, VRD, DL, (Royal Naval Volunteer Reserve, Retired), Chairman, Civil Defence Committee, Cumberland County Council.
- Ruby Georgina Nancy Freeman. For political and public services in Willesden and Middlesex.
- William Arthur Geenty, County Planning Officer, Durham.
- Sam Calvert Gibb, Principal, Melton Mowbray College of Further Education.
- Arthur James Gidley, Principal Inspector, Board of Customs and Excise.
- James Morris Gillies, JP. For political and public services in Dundee.
- John Stanley Gittins, Principal, Aycliffe Classifying School, Darlington, County Durham.
- Eileen Mary Glendinning, JP. For political and public services in Belfast.
- Captain Francis George Glossop, JP, Royal Navy (Retired), lately Chairman, Devon and Cornwall Hospital Services Committee.
- Basil Robertson Goodfellow. For services to Mountaineering.
- Alderman Emil Grant, Chairman, Finchley Savings Committee.
- William Edrington Gray, DFC, Principal Scientific Officer, Royal Aircraft Establishment, Ministry of Aviation.
- Eric Stanley Greenaway, Headmaster, Yorkshire Residential School for the Deaf, Doncaster.
- Henry John Grimsey, MBE, Grade 2 Officer, Ministry of Labour.
- Major Brian Joseph Halliday, MC, MM, President, National Federation of Anglers.
- David John Davenport-Handley, JP, DL. For political and public services in Rutland.
- Charles James Hardwicke, Member and Vice-Chairman, Board of Governors, United Cardiff Hospitals.
- Dean Harrison, MC, Area General Manager, Number 8 Area, North Eastern Division, National Coal Board.
- John Frederick Harrison, Chief Mechanical Engineer, British Railways Central Staff.
- Cyril Geoffrey Havers, Senior Engineer, Ministry of Transport.
- William Hay, Chairman, Employment and Training Advisory Committee, Londonderry.
- Thomas Charles Stanley Haywood, JP, DL, Deputy Chairman, Rutland County Agricultural Executive Committee.
- Alderman Wyndham Finch Hender. For political and public services in Cornwall.
- Charles George Hillier, Grade 2 Officer, Ministry of Labour.
- Norman Himsworth, attached War Office.
- Lieutenant-Colonel Victor Christian Holland, County Honorary Secretary, Derbyshire Branch, Soldiers', Sailors' and Airmen's Families Association.
- Robert Frank Howe, Chief Bankruptcy Clerk, Board of Trade.
- Major Charles Westley Hume, MC, Secretary-General, Universities Federation for Animal Welfare.
- William Herbert Hurden, Assistant Director of Stores, Admiralty.
- Alexander Hutchison, MD, FRFPS, Medical Officer of Health, City and County of Kingston upon Hull.
- Edward Clarendon Hyde, Senior Mechanical and Electrical Engineer, Air Ministry.
- Cedric Euan Iliffe, ERD, Head of Central Technical Services, United Kingdom Atomic Energy Authority.
- Kathleen Irving, MBE, Chairman, Street Savings Groups Sub-Committee, York.
- Kenneth Trelawny Jago, MBE, Vice-Chairman, Council of the Royal Air Forces Association.
- John William Jeffery, Engineer Grade I, Royal Ordnance Factory, Blackburn.
- John Ratray Johnstone, Chief Constable, Inverness-shire Constabulary. (Died 27 May 1962.)
- David Tydfilyn Jones, HM Inspector of Schools, Ministry of Education.
- Arthur William Kay, Chairman, People's Theatre Arts Group, Newcastle-upon-Tyne.
- David McKie Kerslake, MB, BS, Senior Principal Scientific Officer, Royal Air Force Institute of Aviation Medicine, Farnborough.
- Alderman Ernald de Mosley Kippax, MBE, Chairman, Wells Savings Committee.
- James Ritchie Langmuir, MB, ChB, JP, General Practitioner, Glasgow.
- Alexander Law, HM Inspector of Schools (Higher Grade), Scottish Education Department.
- Joseph George Leggett, MBE, Grade 2 Officer, Ministry of Labour.
- Ernest Henry Lindgren, Curator, National Film Archive.
- Bernard Lindlaw, Principal, Ministry of Pensions and National Insurance.
- John Litchfield, Senior Surveyor, Ministry of Works.
- Samuel Wilfrid Lloyd, Principal Inspector of Taxes, Board of Inland Revenue.
- Donald Lockett, Chief Constable, Bournemouth Borough Police.
- Edmund Harvey Lodge, MB, ChB, Commissioner, West Riding of Yorkshire, St. John Ambulance Brigade.
- William Alfred Reginald Long, Employer Chairman, South London District Advisory Committee, London and South-East Regional Board for Industry.
- Kenneth MacIver, MC, Managing Director, Duncan MacIver Ltd., Fish Curers, Stornoway, Isle of Lewis.
- Norman Eric McKinna, Higher Waterguard Superintendent, Liverpool, Board of Customs and Excise.
- James Brown McKinney, MB, BCh, Medical Officer of Health, County Down.
- John McArthur McNicol, Headmaster, Copeland Road Junior Secondary School, Glasgow.
- Finlay John Macrae, DFC, Principal Probation Inspector, Home Office.
- Helen Isabel McSwiney. For services to the Girl Guides Association.
- John Coulthard McVittie, MB, ChB, Senior Medical Officer, Ministry of Pensions and National Insurance.
- Kathleen Davey Maddever, Regional Milk Advisory Officer, Grade I, Ministry of Agriculture, Fisheries and Food.
- Stanley Percy Martin, Grade 2 Officer, Branch B, Foreign Office.
- Norman William Reginald Mawle, DFC, JP, Chairman, West Bromwich Savings Committee.
- Alderman Sidney Luddington Meggeson, Chairman, National Executive Committee, Royal Society for the Prevention of Accidents.
- James Patterson Michael, MB, BCh For public services in Helston, Cornwall.
- John Harold Middleton, MBE, General Secretary, Civil Service Sports Council.
- Henry Robert Mills, Representative of the British Council in Malaya.
- Constance Mary Monks, JP. For political and public services in the North-West of England.
- Kenneth Arthur Sonntag Headlam-Morley, Secretary of the Iron and Steel Institute.
- Catherine Scott Morton, JP. Member of Aidrie Town Council and former Provost of Airdrie.
- Frank Morton. For political and public services on the West Riding of Yorkshire.
- William Mowbray, General Secretary, Scottish Union of Bakers and Allied Workers.
- Albert George Moyle, JP, Alderman, Flintshire County Council.
- Dorothy Jean Neale, Headteacher, Hartsholme County Primary Infants' School, Lincoln.
- Captain John Charles Nettleship, Commodore Master, SS Serenia, Shell Tankers Ltd., London.
- Cyril Newell, Chief Executive Officer, Ministry of Transport.
- William Norris, Deputy Regional Controller, East and West Ridings Region, National Assistance Board.
- Harry Norton, General Secretary, Electrical Power Engineers' Association.
- Group Captain James MacConnell Orr, Member, Scottish Air Cadet Council.
- Major Eric Robert Oxlade, JP, Secretary, Territorial and Auxiliary Forces Association for the County of Oxford.
- Francis Tyldesley Pagett, JP. For political and public services in Lancashire.
- Eric Thomas Parker, Deputy Chairman, Hampshire Agricultural Executive Committee.
- Guy Devereux Pearsons. For political services in Ipswich.
- Arthur Gordon Peddie, Chairman, Central Milk Distributive Committee.
- George James Peebles, Engineer I, Rocket Propulsion Establishment, Westcott, Ministry of Aviation.
- Howard Latimer Penman, Head of Physics Department, Rothamsted Experimental Station.
- Norman Stuart Perkins, Farmer, Pembrokeshire.
- Frederick William Perks, Chairman of Radio Industry Exhibitions Ltd.
- Henry Laurence Pettitt, Chief Administrative Officer, Public Trustee Office.
- The Honourable Gwenllian Philipps, JP. For political and public services in Breconshire and Radnorshire.
- Jim Phillips. For political services in Woking.
- Hugh Golding Pinner, JP. For political and public services in Smethwick.
- Kenneth George Turnell Pomeroy, Vice-Principal, Stranmillis College, Belfast.
- Lieutenant-Colonel Edward Roger Pratt, MC, DL, Chairman, Downham District Committee, Norfolk Agricultural Executive Committee.
- Percy Ernest Pritchard, Head Postmaster, Peterborough.
- John Robert Quayle. For public services in the Isle of Man.
- Henry Gordon Rae, Assistant Secretary, Local Authorities' Conditions of Service Advisory Board.
- Alderman Daphne Mildred Raynsford, Chairman, St. Crispin Hospital Management Committee, Northampton.
- The Reverend Ronald Davis Rees, Overseas Secretary, Institute of Christian Education.
- Harold Rogan, General Manager, Springfields Works, United Kingdom Atomic Energy Authority.
- John Hubert Saunders, Manager, Port of London under National Dock Labour Board.
- Hugh Brougham Sedgfield, MBE, Director of Research and Development, Sperry Gyroscope Co., Ltd., Bracknell, Berkshire.
- David McHardy Semple, Chairman, The Mirrlees Watson Co., Ltd., Engineers and Founders, Glasgow.
- Norman Francis Sephton, Telecommunications Controller, North Eastern Region, General Post Office.
- William Methuen Shortt, Principal Scientific Officer, Ministry of Agriculture, Fisheries and Food.
- Mary Kathleen Sibson. For political and public services in Carlisle.
- John William Sidford, Principal Collector, Board of Inland Revenue.
- Alexander Martin Smith, Head of Chemistry Department, Edinburgh and East of Scotland School of Agriculture.
- Brian Charles Pye-Smith, JP, Vice-President, Yorkshire Association of Boys' Clubs.
- The Honourable Honor Mildred Vivian Smith, MD, MRCP, Honorary Consultant Neurologist, Military Hospital, Wheatley, Oxfordshire.
- Walter Vernon Smyth, Superintending Engineer, Ministry of Finance for Northern Ireland.
- Clarence Stott, MC, Chief Engineer, South-Eastern Gas Board.
- Colonel Maxwell Hamilton Summers, DSO, TD, MRCS, LRCP, DL, General Practitioner, Burnham, Buckinghamshire.
- Horace Robert Swatman, Chief Experimental Officer, Fighting Vehicles Research and Development Establishment, War Office.
- Donald Syme. For services as Secretary and Financial Adviser to United Kingdom Defence, Research and Supply Staff, Melbourne.
- Frank William Symmonds, MBE, lately Chief Executive Officer, War Office.
- Sidney Cyril Tarry, MBE, Chairman, Wandsworth and Battersea War Pensions Committee.
- Thomas Woodfine Taylor. For services to the Order of the British Empire.
- Captain Norman Thomas Thurston, MC, Secretary, Coventry Cathedral Reconstruction Committee.
- Harold William Tombs, MBE, Manager, Pipelines and Terminal Division, Engineering Department, British Petroleum Co., Ltd.
- Alderman John Wilfred Trickett, JP. For public services in the West Riding of Yorkshire.
- John Tusa, Managing Director, British Bata Shoe Co., Ltd.
- Margaret Anne Vickers, JP. For public services in Cumberland.
- Edward Waite, Headmaster, Shaftoe Trust School, Haydon Bridge, Northumberland.
- Alexander John Webb, Assistant Operating Manager (Railways), London Transport Executive.
- Richard Willsher Weekes, Managing Director, Harland Engineering Co. Ltd.
- Adelaide Elfrida Welser, Chief Executive Officer, Foreign Office.
- Frank Ernest Whipp, Managing Director, Whipp & Bourne Ltd., Rochdale, Lancashire.
- Roger Ernest Cecil Whipp, lately Principal, Scottish Home Department.
- Commander Walter Edward Whitehead, (Royal Naval Volunteer Reserve, Retired), President of Schweppes (U.S.A.) Ltd.
- Richard William George Macgregor Wilson. For political services in Henley-on-Thames.
- William Newrick Wilson, MBE, Chief Constable, Portsmouth City Police.
- William Douglas Wolseley, County Inspector, Royal Ulster Constabulary.
- Arthur Townsend Wood, Divisional Manager, Far East, Cable & Wireless, Hong Kong.
- Frank Wood, Mechanical Engineer, Metropolitan Water Board.
- James Bonar Wood, Chairman, Wigan Local National Insurance Tribunal.
- Maurice Geoffrey Woods, Chairman and Managing Director, Woods of Colchester Ltd., Essex.
- John Norman Wright, (Senior Principal Clerk, Board of Inland Revenue.
- The Venerable Frederick James Bailey, MVO, Archdeacon of Malta.
- George Blackburn, President, British Chamber of Commerce, Belgium.
- Ignace Gerard Henri de Brugada, British subject resident in the Malagasy Republic.
- Reginald Morphett Cobb, British subject resident in Portugal.
- Denzil Inglis Dunnett, lately Her Majesty's Consul, Elisabethville.
- Eric Charles Field, British subject resident in Guatemala.
- Alexis Forter, First Secretary, Her Majesty's Embassy, Tehran.
- Sidney Arthur Foster, British subject resident in France.
- Stephen John Henry, Chief Legal Officer, British Military Government, Berlin.
- Reginald Frederick Lambert, British subject resident in Morocco.
- Kenneth Charles Liddell, British subject resident in Switzerland.
- Lancelot Joseph Milburn, British subject resident in Brazil.
- John Kenneth Reuterdahl, MBE, lately Her Majesty's Consul, Bergen.
- Olive Saywell, MBE, Headmistress, British Council Kindergarten, Baghdad.
- Thomas Wareing Shaw, lately Director of Public Works, Cyrenaica.
- Albert Ernest Wernly, Secretary, British-Swedish Chamber of Commerce, Stockholm.
- Norman Williams, British subject resident in the United States of America.
- Alan Walter Campbell, of Brisbane, State of Queensland. For services to the primary industries.
- Gustavus Ernest Chittick, Mayor of the Municipality of Kiama, State of New South of Wales.
- Colonel Edward George Herris Clarke, MC, formerly Development Secretary of the Victoria League.
- John Clemenger. For public services in the State of Victoria.
- Eric Alexander Dickson, formerly Director, Technical Education Teaching Service, State of New South Wales.
- Alan Parkhurst Dodd, MBE, Director, Biological Section, Department of Public Lands, State of Queensland.
- The Reverend Mother Mary Damian Duncombe, All Hallows Convent, Brisbane, State of Queensland.
- Maurice John Edwards. For services to the British community in South India.
- Frank Alan Fielding, Acting Senior Assistant Commissioner, Royal Federation of Malaya Police.
- Jean Harris, Headmistress, Methodist Ladies' College, Adelaide, State of South Australia.
- Reginald Arthur Haryott. For services to the British community in India.
- Robert Joseph Hoare, Under Secretary, Department of Labour and Industry, State of Queensland.
- Harry Cary Hockley, Chairman, United Africa Company of Ghana Ltd.
- Frank Hutchens. For services to Music in the State of New South Wales.
- David Bryan Kimble, formerly Head of the Institute of Extra Mural Studies, University of Ghana, Legon.
- Norman Ellvard Langdale, Director of Engineering Training and Placement, College of Engineering, New Delhi, India.
- Jean Littlejohn, MB, BS. For services to the Deaf in the State of Victoria.
- Edward John McCann, of Hobart, State of Tasmania. For services to charitable movements.
- Everett Randall Magnus, a member of the dental profession on the State of New South Wales.
- Gordon Carey Morrissey, MD, a private medical practitioner, of Ingham, State of Queensland.
- Ross Thomas Shelmerdine, Chairman of the National Heart Campaign in the State of Victoria.
- Vera Ada Summers, formerly Principal, Presbyterian Ladies' College, Peppermint Grove, State of Western Australia.
- Eric Stephen Thomas, Comptroller of Inland Revenue, Federation of Malaya.
- Reginald John Croasdell Wait, Acting Controller of Supply, The Treasury, Federation of Malaya.
- The Venerable Leslie Clyde Smith Walker, formerly Principal of the Brotherhood of the Good Shepherd at Dubbo, and Administrator of the Diocese of Bathurst, State of New South Wales.
- Mary Vera Walker, Honorary Secretary, Country Women's Association, State of South Australia.
- John Percival Webb. For public services in the State of Victoria.
- Datu Abang Haji Openg bin Abang Sapifee. For public services in Sarawak.
- John Alleyne Adamson. For public services in British Guiana.
- Yekoniya Kaira Lubogo, Research Officer (Soil Scientist), Department of Agriculture, North Borneo.
- Ian Fowler Baillie, Protectorate Financial Secretary, Aden.
- Geoffrey Leader Bellhouse. For public services in Kenya.
- Hugh Roland Budd Bentley, Chief Engineer to the Georgetown Sewerage and Water Commissioners, British Guiana.
- Roland Alexander Bewsher, Extension Training Officer, Department of Agriculture, Sarawak.
- Jean Frederic Edouard Brunel, Medical Superintendent, Brown Sequard Hospital, Mauritius.
- James Alexander Burgess, Permanent Secretary, Uganda.
- Sidney John George Burt, Senior Principal, Education Department, Hong Kong.
- Anthony Camilleri, Comptroller of Customs, Malta.
- George Thomas Whitmore Carr, Deputy Commissioner of Police, Trinidad.
- John Alexander Danford, MBE, British Council's representative in Trinidad.
- Lewis Mervyn Davies, Senior Assistant Secretary (Finance), Western Pacific High Commission.
- Colin De Groot, Secretary for Student Affairs, The Commission for The West Indies, British Guiana and British Honduras.
- Arthur John Alexander Douglas, MBE, Administration Secretary, Bechuanaland Protectorate.
- Kenneth Evans, Town Clerk, Kampala Municipal Council, Uganda.
- Joseph Wiltshire Fletcher, MBE. For public services in Grenada.
- Rafael Aloysius Fonseca, Principal Assistant Secretary, British Honduras.
- David Thom McWhinnie Girvan, JP, Chairman of the Social Welfare Commission, Jamaica.
- Charles James Gomez, MBE, Financial Secretary, Gibraltar.
- Geoffrey Colin Guy, MBE, Administrator, Turks and Caicos Islands.
- Arthur Abraham Haller, Chairman and General Manager, Maize Marketing Board, Kenya.
- Oscar Ethelbert Henry, formerly Permanent Secretary, Ministry of Labour and Social Affairs, The West Indies.
- Gerald Hudson. For services to music in Barbados.
- Eric John Linsell, lately Deputy Commissioner, Singapore Police Force.
- Walter Edward Miller Logan, Chief Conservator of Forests, Uganda.
- The Reverend Canon Gordon William McAvan. For services to education in Mauritius.
- Vincent Constantine McCormack, JP. For public services and for services to sport in Jamaica.
- Wing Commander Alfred Hardwicke Marsack, MBE, Royal Air Force (Retired), lately Director of Civil Aviation, Aden.
- Joseph Pascal Nabwana. For public services in Kenya.
- James Louis Pembroke, Deputy Commissioner of Income Tax, East African Common Services Organisation.
- Ian Gordon Robson, Head of Pay Department, Crown Agents for Oversea Governments and Administrations.
- Jean Macdonald Robertson, Head of Department of Social Studies, University of Singapore.
- Gordon Armstrong Skipper, Senior District Commissioner, Kenya.
- Gordon Brian Slade, QC, Solicitor-General, Uganda.
- Charles Alexander Stinson. For public services in Fiji.
- Albert Charles Thackeray, Deputy Regional Director, East African Posits and Telecommunications Administration.
- Ebenezer Walter Davidson Thomas, Senior Accountant, Gambia.
- Alan George Tilbury, Assistant Attorney-General, Bechuanaland Protectorate.
- The Very Reverend Father Joseph Vrignaud, Vicar General, St. Lucia.
- Peter James Freeman Wheeler, Administrator, Tristan da Cunha.

Southern Rhodesia

- Barnett Kaplan. For services to the community in the Mtoko District of Southern Rhodesia.
- Reginald Joseph King, of Salisbury, Southern Rhodesia. For services to social welfare organisations.
- Edward Stanley White, MBE, Town Clerk, Bulawayo, Southern Rhodesia.

Northern Rhodesia

- Percy William May Allin, Surveyor-General, Northern Rhodesia.
- Ronald Golding Gabbitas, JP. For public services in Northern Rhodesia.
- Eric Leighton, Assistant Commissioner of Police, Northern Rhodesia.
- Leonard Frank Smale, City Treasurer of Lusaka, Northern Rhodesia.

Nyasaland

- Bryn Jones-Walters, Chief Information Officer, Nyasaland.
- Robert Kay Walker. For public services in Nyasaland.

==== Member of the Order of the British Empire (MBE) ====
Military Division

Royal Navy

- Recruiting Officer Leo Edward Brown, (Retired).
- Lieutenant-Commander Norman Jack Dominy, (Retired) (for service with the Ghana Navy).
- Engineer Lieutenant-Commander Gordon Frederick Fayers.
- Lieutenant-Commander (SD) John Henry Ford.
- Lieutenant-Commander Robert George Glenn.
- Captain (SD) Edward Graham, Royal Marines.
- Lieutenant-Commander Michael James Arbuthnot Keyworth.
- Shipwright Lieutenant-Commander Ernest Edward Kingdon, (Retired).
- Lieutenant-Commander Thomas John Kinna.
- Wardmaster Lieutenant-Commander John Alfred Ernest Lihou.
- Lieutenant-Commander Douglas David MacFarlan.
- Lieutenant-Commander Francis Everard Meynell, (Retired).
- Lieutenant-Commander Gilbert William James Pugh.
- Lieutenant-Commander Rex Turpin.

Army

- Major Douglas Kenneth Allen (219863), Royal Army Ordnance Corps.
- Major Evelyn Ballesty, ARRC, (206052), Queen Alexandra's Royal Army Nursing Corps.
- Major Robert John Barlow (86640), Royal Corps of Signals (now R.A.R.O.).
- Captain (Quartermaster) Alfred John Bennett, MM, (432232), 9th/12th Royal Lancers (Prince of Wales's), Royal Armoured Corps.
- Major Alexander Crawford Simpson Boswell (397816), Argyll and Sutherland Highlanders (Princess Louise's).
- 22220719 Warrant Officer Class I Charles Henry Brooks, The Royal Warwickshire Regiment, Territorial Army.
- Major (acting) George William Brown (361161), Army Cadet Force.
- Major William Brown (348579), Royal Pioneer Corps (now retired).
- 46900 Warrant Officer Class I (Armament Sergeant-Major) John Frederick Bryan, Corps of Royal Electrical and Mechanical Engineers, Territorial Army.
- Major (acting) Frederick George Carew (351966), Army Cadet Force.
- Major Claude Edward Case (112826), Royal Army Service Corps.
- Major William Scott Caskey (352265), Royal Army Pay Corps.
- 10687016 Warrant Officer Class II John Victor Clarke, Royal Regiment of Artillery, Territorial Army.
- Lieutenant (Quartermaster) Frederick John Clutton, MM, (470918), Grenadier Guards.
- 22512497 Warrant Officer Class II Jack Cornish, Royal Army Medical Corps, Territorial Army.
- Major John Bertie Harris Daniel, MC, (85511), Royal Regiment of Artillery.
- Major John Davie, MC, (303875), Queen's Own Highlanders (Seaforth and Camerons).
- Captain (Quartermaster) George Otto Davies (426617), Royal Army Service Corps.
- Major (acting) Stanley William Doggett, TD, (87387), Combined Cadet Force.
- Lieutenant (Quartermaster) Louis Charles Drouet (459157), Grenadier Guards.
- Major (Quartermaster) William Elliott (429374), Royal Army Service Corps.
- Captain (Quartermaster) Brian Patrick Feehily (440867), The Parachute Regiment.
- 865484 Warrant Officer Class I Frank Wilfred Flood, The Staffordshire Regiment (The Prince of Wales's).
- Major (Quartermaster) Cyril Nathaniel Harry Flower (211120), Corps of Royal Engineers, Territorial Army.
- LS/6138850 Warrant Officer Class I (local) John Robert William French, Corps of Royal Electrical and Mechanical Engineers.
- Major Harold Robert Gatehouse (375283), The Queen's Own Buffs, The Royal Kent Regiment.
- Major Peter Echlin Gerahty (207799), 1st Green jackets, 43rd and 52nd.
- Major Samuel George Greenaway (175794), The Royal Irish Fusiliers (Princess Victoria's) (Retired).
- Lieutenant-Colonel (local) Charles Joseph Montgomery Hamilton (95105), Royal Regiment of Artillery.
- Major (Quartermaster) Leonard Arthur James Hart, TD, (279161), Royal Army Medical Corps, Territorial Army.
- Major (Director of Music) Sidney Victor Hays (384887), Royal Regiment of Artillery.
- 75176 Warrant Officer Class II George Croy Henderson, Corps of Royal Electrical and Mechanical Engineers, Territorial Army.
- 865749 Warrant Officer Class II Leonard William Hitchcock, Royal Regiment of Artillery, Territorial Army.
- Captain Hartley Crabb Honeyman (370022), Corps of Royal Engineers.
- Major William Frederick George Hoskings (360241), Royal Corps of Signals.
- Major Shelagh Mary Howe (252201), Women's Royal Army Corps.
- 859404 Warrant Officer Class II Leslie Joel, Corps of Royal Electrical and Mechanical Engineers, Territorial Army.
- Second-Lieutenant Peter Harold Kennett (470537), Corps of Royal Electrical and Mechanical Engineers.
- LS/797037 Warrant Officer Class I Geoffrey Kingsford, Royal Regiment of Artillery.
- Captain Hugh Raymond Leach (440072), Royal Tank Regiment, Royal Armoured Corps.
- LS/4686430 Warrant Officer Class I (acting) John Leach, Royal Regiment of Artillery.
- Major Peter John Hall Leng, MC, (307865), Scots Guards.
- Major Andrew Donald Macintyre (326923), The Royal Ulster Rifles.
- Major Mary Oswell Mackenzie, TD, (196325), Women's Royal Army Corps, Territorial Army.
- Major (acting) Kenneth Newton Marshall (265942), Combined Cadet Force.
- Major Sydney Gordon Barrington Matthews (345102), The Royal Hampshire Regiment.
- 3189012 Warrant Officer Class I James Murdoch, DCM, The King's Own Scottish Borderers.
- T/2572343 Warrant Officer Class II Arthur John Owen, Royal Army Service Corps.
- Major James Christopher Parkinson, TD, (269375), The Parachute Regiment, Territorial Army.
- Captain Richard Hubert Llewellyn Philpin (243744), Corps of Royal Engineers, Territorial Army.
- Major (Q.G.O.) Pirthilal Pun, MC, (388500), 2nd King Edward VII's Own Gurkha Rifles (The Sirmoor Rifles).
- 22267860 Warrant Officer Class I Harry Randall, The Duke of Wellington's Regiment (West Riding).
- Major (Staff Quartermaster) John Frederick Robinson (297167), Corps of Royal Engineers (Employed List 2).
- Major William Alexander Shannon (446554), Corps of Royal Engineers, Territorial Army.
- Captain (Quartermaster) John William Miles Stevens (451175), Corps of Royal Engineers.
- 19005828 Warrant Officer Class II Wray Stuart, Army Physical Training Corps.
- 2328387 Warrant Officer Class I Leslie John Taylor, Royal Corps of Signals.
- 3050431 Warrant Officer Class I Peter Burnside Taylor, Royal Army Educational Corps.
- Lieutenant Robin Nigel Tillard (449069), The Royal Hampshire Regiment.
- MYA/18015647 Warrant Officer Class I Wan Jalil bin Ahmad, The Singapore Guard Regiment.
- S/204474 Warrant Officer Class I (acting) Leonard George Warr, BEM, Royal Army Service Corps.
- 22510541 Warrant Officer Class II Eric Sydney Lapthorne Webb, The Parachute Regiment, Territorial Army.
- Major William John Whatley, TD, (306289), Royal Army Medical Corps.
- Captain Herbert Sidney White (357930), Corps of Royal Engineers.
- 200439 Warrant Officer Class II Lloyd William John Williams, Royal Army Service Corps.
- Major George Harry Willis (307158), Corps of Royal Electrical and Mechanical Engineers (now retired).
- Major Maurice Kirby Beedle (217444), The Staffordshire Regiment (The Prince of Wales's); formerly on loan to the Government of Ghana.
- 7662542 Warrant Officer Class I Cyril Valentine Harris, Royal Army Pay Corps; on loan to the Government of Ghana.
- Major John Desmond Lofts (375941), Royal Army Service Corps; formerly on loan to the Government of Ghana.
- Major John Gerard Parham (393239), Royal Regiment of Artillery; on loan to the Government of the Federation of Malaya.
- Major Patrick Antony Winter (314079), The Royal Ulster Rifles; formerly on loan to the Government of the Federation of Malaya.
- Major William Albert Johnston, British Honduras Volunteer Guard.

Royal Air Force

- Squadron Leader Cyril Ernest Allso (172844).
- Squadron Leader Leonard John Bristow (568707).
- Squadron Leader Charles Gaiger Broad (189584).
- Squadron Leader Robert Cairns (59004).
- Squadron Leader Ronald Chadwick (141531).
- Squadron Leader Harry Chant (57403).
- Squadron Leader William Robert Francis Cooney (149750).
- Squadron Leader Frederick Gordon Gumming, MB, ChB, (59977).
- Squadron Leader Henry Sidney Ellis (46287).
- Squadron Leader John Gingell (180545).
- Squadron Leader Frank Richard Jones (27028).
- Squadron Leader Edward Walter Lawson (570291).
- Squadron Leader Cecil Reginald Long, DSM, (567971).
- Squadron Leader John Henry Maguire (53759).
- Squadron Leader Deane Drake Pearce (126152).
- Squadron Leader Victor Arthur Stapley, DFC, (175092).
- Acting Squadron Leader Leslie Harold Charles Batt (111066), Royal Air Force Volunteer Reserve (Training Branch).
- Acting Squadron Leader Norman Eric Flemmings (59010).
- Acting Squadron Leader William John Brown Varlow (64736), Royal Air Force Volunteer Reserve (Training Branch).
- Acting Squadron Leader Harold William Wilson (111897), Royal Air Force Volunteer Reserve (Training Branch).
- Flight Lieutenant Ronald Henry Alison (198793).
- Flight Lieutenant Roy George Asbey (1211562).
- Flight Lieutenant William John Brown (516903).
- Flight Lieutenant Leon William Collingridge (42196).
- Flight Lieutenant Robert Alexander West Ferguson (534443).
- Flight Lieutenant Leslie William Fowler (201868).
- Flight Lieutenant Francis Edwyn Swinnerton Keiller, MB, ChB, (2252810).
- Flight Lieutenant Samuel George Kilford (53976).
- Flight Lieutenant John Frederick McGowan (50396).
- Flight Lieutenant Philip Abercrombie Oakley (4081275).
- Flight Lieutenant John Alexander Fairley Young (614220).
- Acting Flight Lieutenant John Douglass Griffiths (572169).
- Acting Flight Lieutenant Sylvester Leaker (67881), Royal Air Force Volunteer Reserve (Training Branch).
- Acting Flight Lieutenant Ronald Brian Loader (576816).
- Acting Flight Lieutenant John Frederick Walker (617812).
- Flying Officer James Smith (2296751).
- Master Technician Maurice Raymond Bodin Shaw (576976).
- Warrant Officer Sydney Willis Bushell (1167414).
- Warrant Officer Joan Gwendolen Chapman (883062), Women's Royal Air Force.
- Warrant Officer Arthur James Coutts, BEM, (633230).
- Warrant Officer Leslie Frank Davis (519429).
- Warrant Officer Percy Henry Lockett (564881).
- Warrant Officer Harold Cecil Miller (516784).
- Warrant Officer Dorothy Ada Shepherd (444338), Women's Royal Air Force.
- Warrant Officer Frederick Storr (563764).
- Warrant Officer Wilfred Ernest Twissell (507745).
- Warrant Officer Jack Clement Jonas Wimlett (522476).

Civil Division

- Charles Pryce Abbott, Member, Bee Disease Advisory Committee.
- Rose Acres, Departmental Sister, Duchess of Gloucester House, Ministry of Labour.
- Alexander Adamson, Scottish Golf Journalist.
- Alfred George Addison, JP, Works Personnel Officer, Paints Division, Imperial Chemical Industries, Ltd.
- Charles John Aiano, Secretary, Civil Service Nursing Aid Association.
- James Anderson, Catering Adviser, Northern Ireland Hospitals Authority.
- James Stewart Annand, Vice-President, Scottish Association of Young Farmers' Clubs.
- William Armstrong, Higher Executive Officer, National Assistance Board.
- Albert John Arnett, Clerical Officer, Board of Trade.
- Commander Percy Ashe, Royal Navy (Retired), Senior Whale Fishery Inspector, Ministry of Agriculture, Fisheries and Food.
- Helen Charlotte Cecilia Asher, JP, Chairman, Cornwall and Isles of Scilly War Pensions Committee.
- Florence Evelyn Athron. For political and public services in Doncaster.
- Jack Robert Avert, Area Works Officer, Northern Region, Commonwealth War Graves Commission.
- Jesse Baker. For political services in Wigan.
- Mildred Elsie Baker, Grade 5 Officer, Branch B, Foreign Office.
- Annie Amelia Barnes, Chairman of Committee, No. 338 (West Ham) Squadron, Air Training Corps.
- Major Ernest James Bate, Chairman, Dudley and District War Pensions Committee.
- Fredrick Richard Beaven, Senior Executive Officer, Ministry of Works.
- Dorothy Joan Bedford, JP, County Organiser, Warwickshire, Women's Voluntary Service.
- Ada Mary Belfield, JP, Alderman, Derbyshire County Council.
- Leonard Henry Bell, Senior Museum Assistant, British Museum.
- Alderman Letitia Bell. For political and public services in Newport, Monmouthshire.
- Bernard Keith Bennett, Divisional Officer, East Sussex Fire Brigade.
- George Best, Technical Grade I, Royal Ordnance Factory, Cardiff, Ministry of Aviation.
- Ralph Daniel Binfield, Senior Information Officer, Central Office of Information.
- Eleanor Patricia Bird, Office Manager, British Trade Commission, Kingston, Jamaica.
- Thomas Ernest Bird, JP, Chairman of the Prison Visiting Committee, HM Prison, Manchester.
- James Aikman Blair, lately Senior Executive Officer, Ministry of Pensions and National Insurance.
- Arthur Blanchard, Higher Executive Officer, Commonwealth Relations Office.
- Frank Dean Boardman, Ship Electrical Manager, Cammell Laird & Co. (Shipbuilders & Engineers) Ltd., Birkenhead.
- Mary Constance Boddy. For political services in Bishop Auckland.
- Albert William Bond. For political services.
- Marie Louise Laslett Boosey. For political services in Essex.
- Frederick William Boyce, Steward, Star and Gaiter Home for Disabled Sailors, Soldiers and Airmen, Richmond.
- Muriel Jane Brand, Nurse in Charge of Medical and Welfare Services, Mather & Platt Ltd., Manchester.
- Alfred Reginald Browne, Assistant County Education Officer, Warwickshire County Council.
- Patrick Gerald Buckley, Higher Executive Officer, Air Ministry.
- Charles Ephraim Buddin, DSM, Secretary, Portsmouth Local Committee, Royal Naval Benevolent Trust.
- James Burrows, JP. For political services in Belfast.
- John Frederick Charley Butcher, Chief Photographer, Ministry of Aviation.
- Rowland Buxton, Chairman, Derby and District War Pensions Committee.
- Alan Cameron, Stores Supervisory Grade I, Royal Aircraft Establishment, Farnborough, Ministry of Aviation.
- Archibald Gordon Campbell, MC, Commandant, Dunbartonshire Special Constabulary.
- William John Cannon, Accountant, Board of Customs and Excise.
- Ernest James Case, Councillor, Lincolnshire (Holland) County Council.
- Annie Cattle. For political services in County Durham.
- Edwin Hugh Chambers, Divisional Officer, Hertfordshire Fire Brigade.
- Herbert Chambers, Advisor to Personnel Manager, United States of America (Western Routes), British Overseas Airways Corporation.
- Edith Brenda Chaplin, Grade 2 Conference Officer, Foreign Office.
- Dorothy Louisa Chapman, Ward Sister, Nuffield Orthopaedic Centre.
- Ada Florence Charles, Chairman, Kidderminster Ladies Voluntary Committee (Maternity & Child Welfare).
- Gladys Lucy Anne Charles, lately Headmistress, St. John's Special School, Newport, Monmouthshire.
- William Herbert Chilton, Assistant Chief Engineer, Structural Design Office, Risley, United Kingdom Atomic Energy Authority.
- Alexander Grant Chirrey, Director and Works Manager, James Robertson & Sons (Preserve Manufacturers) Ltd., Droylsden, Manchester.
- Major Harry Francis Clark, JP, Deputy District Commandant, Ulster Special Constabulary.
- Robert Joseph Clark, lately Executive-Officer, Scottish Command, War Office.
- Dorothy Louise Clarke, Higher Executive Officer, Colonial Office.
- Victor George Clarke, Regional Fatstock Officer, Ministry of Agriculture, Fisheries and Food.
- Charles Clifford Clingan, Assistant Chief Constable, Plymouth City Police.
- Winifred Jean Howard-Clitty, Map Research Officer, War Office.
- Charles Fred Newman Collins, Senior Executive Officer, Board of Trade.
- Eliza Foster, Lady Colston. For political services.
- Captain Robert Wrightson Cooke, Harbour Master and Traffic Superintendent, Dover Harbour Board.
- James Douglas Crawshaw, Head of Department, Dockyard Technical College, Chatham, Admiralty.
- Ivan Arthur Cridge, Warning Officer, Warning and Monitoring Organisation, Yeovil.
- Alfred Victor Crossley, Senior Executive Officer, Ministry of Pensions and National Insurance.
- William Craig Dalgoutte, Grade 3 Officer, Branch B, Foreign Office.
- Edith Eliza Daniels, Matron of Storth Oaks, Middlesex County Council Home for the Aged.
- John Elias Davies, Higher Executive Officer, Ministry of Pensions and National Insurance.
- Roland George Davies, VRD, TD. For services to youth in Guernsey.
- Osmond George Dellenty, MM, BEM, Superintendent, War Department Constabulary, Central Ordnance Depot, Bicester.
- Albert Dickinson, Honorary Treasurer, The Seamark (Merchant Navy) Club.
- Garrett Dickson. For political services in Edinburgh.
- Audrey Haslewood Fowler-Dixon. For political services in Islington.
- Arthur Edward Downing. For political and public services in Rowley Regis and Tipton.
- Alfred George Drury, Commodore Chief Engineer, MV Whitewing, General Steam Navigation Company Ltd., London.
- Robert Duncan, Main Grade Engineer, Ministry of Transport.
- Thomas Dyer, Chairman, Royston, Yorkshire Savings Committee.
- Arthur Eames, lately Senior Executive Officer, Export Credits Guarantee Department.
- William George Edwards, JP, Member, General Councils of Amalgamated Society of Woodworkers and National Federation of Building Trades Operatives.
- Frederick George Elliott, Commercial Manager, Cowans, Sheldon & Company Ltd., Carlisle.
- Emma Elstone, Member, Wakefield "B" Group Hospital Management Committee.
- Henrietta Ferlie. For political services in Scotland.
- Harry William Ferris, Executive Officer, Admiralty.
- Ian James Findlay, Headmaster, Dalry Secondary School, Kirkcudbrightshire.
- Reginald Elton Findlay, Senior Executive Officer, Laboratory of the Government Chemist, Department of Scientific and Industrial Research.
- Arthur Cecil Firminger, Frontier Service Officer, Grade I, Joint Services Liaison Organisation, British Army of the Rhine.
- Arthur Gilbert Fisher, Higher Executive Officer, Ministry of Pensions and National Insurance.
- John Findlay Fleming, Head of Engineering Division, Dounreay, United Kingdom Atomic Energy Authority.
- Percy Fleming, Honorary Secretary, Long Baton Savings Committee.
- Edith Irene Ford, Higher Executive Officer, Home Office.
- James Forrester, Chairman, Leven and District Local Employment Committee, Fife.
- James Foster, Staff Officer, Board of Inland Revenue.
- Evelyn Adele Mary Fradgley, Clerical Officer, Admiralty.
- William James Friend, JP, Trade Union Chairman of the East Wales District Advisory Committee, Welsh Board for Industry.
- Charles Thomas Fry, lately Principal Clerk, Chancery Chambers, Royal Courts of Justice.
- Archibald Jackson Fullerton, Public Relations Officer, Scotland, General Post Office.
- Richard Newcombe Woodrow Furse, Senior Executive Officer, Ministry of Pensions and National Insurance.
- Alderman Sidney James Gale, Chairman, Southern Sea Fisheries Committee.
- Thomas Victor Garrud, Commercial Manager, North Thames Gas Board.
- Guendolen Mary, Lady Gent, Head of Health and Hospital Department, Headquarters, Women's Voluntary Service.
- Roger Tichborne George, Clerical Officer, Ministry of Agriculture, Fisheries and Food.
- Margaret Mowat Giles, Honorary Secretary, Sussex County Committee, Women's Section, British Legion.
- Captain Michael Alfred Lonsdale Scudamore Morgan-Giles, Director and Manager, Morgan Giles Ltd., Teignmouth, Devon.
- Albert Glasspool, Clerical Officer, Ministry of Works.
- Raymond Frederick Goldsack, Deputy Clerk to the Justices for the Borough of Hastings.
- Elizabeth Frances Gore, Non-Medical Supervisor of Midwives, London County Council.
- Edward Joseph Gray, Higher Executive Officer, Ministry of Agriculture, Fisheries and Food.
- Edith Emily Green (Mrs. Norris), Secretary, London Fur Trade Association Incorporated.
- Elizabeth Margaret Helen Gregory. For voluntary social services in East Montgomeryshire.
- Dorothy Gregson, Deputy County Organiser, Lancashire, Women's Voluntary Service.
- Janet Moir Grieve, Clerical Officer, Procurator Fiscal's Office, Perth.
- Albert Victor Griffin, Detective Chief Superintendent, Metropolitan Police.
- Margaret Annie Griffin, Executive Officer, Foreign Office.
- Ernest Groves, Divisional Civil Defence Coordinator, East Midlands Division, National Coal Board.
- Stuart Gunnill, Senior Information Officer, Air Ministry.
- Helen Guthrie. For voluntary social work.
- Richard Gwyther, Divisional Fatstock Officer, Ministry of Agriculture, Fisheries and Food.
- Reginald Alner Haime, Director, R. H. & S. L. Plant Ltd., Longton, Stoke-on-Trent.
- Gladys Laura Harpin, Honorary Secretary, Liverpool Clothing Depot, Soldiers', Sailors' and Airmen's Families Association.
- Douglas John Harrison, lately Air Traffic Control Officer, Grade II, Blackpool (Squires Gate) Airport, Ministry of Aviation.
- James Edward Haworth, Senior Executive Engineer, Post Office Research Station, General Post Office.
- Joseph Hawthorne, Deputy Principal, Ministry of Labour and National Insurance for Northern Ireland.
- Alderman Alfred Beaumont Haynes, JP, Chairman, Civil Defence Committee, Poole.
- Andrew Hayward, Traffic Manager, Publications Management, British Broadcasting Corporation.
- Harry Heaton, Assistant Head Postmaster, Blackpool, Lancashire.
- Horace Wright Henderson. For political services in Scotland.
- Sydney William Hester, Senior Experimental Officer, Geological Survey of Great Britain and Museum of Practical Geology, Department of Scientific and Industrial Research.
- Winifred Kate Hewitt. For political and public services in Middlesex.
- Fanny Evelyn Hill, Chairman, Women's Sub-Committee, Nottingham Local Employment Committee.
- Leslie Charles Hill, Manager, Cable & Wireless Ltd., Belize, British Honduras.
- Thomas John Hocking, Superintendent Clerk of Works during the reconstruction of Coventry Cathedral.
- Walter James Hodby, District Commissioner, Tunstall Division, Boy Scouts Association.
- Alderman Ethel Fanny Mahala Hollis. For public services in Essex.
- Phyllys Ada Honeyball, Information Officer, Commonwealth Relations Office.
- David John Howell, Production Manager, Cartridge Case Factory, Edward Curran Engineering, Ltd., Cardiff.
- David Hughes, Executive Officer, Royal Armoured Corps Records Office, War Office.
- Horace Hughes, Vehicle Maintenance Officer, Grade I, Ministry of Works.
- William Ernest Hughes, Senior Executive Officer, Ministry of Pensions and National Insurance.
- Henry Humble. Chairman, Morayshire Local Savings Committee.
- Doris May Humm, Executive Officer, Commonwealth Relations Office.
- Walter James Arthur Humphries, lately Experimental Officer, War Office.
- Charles Leslie Huntingford, Senior Executive Officer, Ministry of Agriculture, Fisheries and Food.
- Thomas James Charles Ibbotson, Senior Executive Officer, Ministry of Housing and Local Government.
- Cyril Jackson, School Broadcasting Organiser, Television, British Broadcasting Corporation.
- Diamond Constance Jagger. For public services in North Wales.
- William Henry Jarmey, Technical Class Grade I, HM Dockyard, Portsmouth.
- Wilfred Albion Jenks, Chief Metallurgist, Lancashire Steel Manufacturing Co. Ltd.
- William Johnstone, Managing Director, Young Windows Ltd., Wishaw.
- Marjorie Jolliffe, Senior Executive Officer, War Office.
- Eleanor Joyce Lancaster-Jones, Science Librarian, British Council.
- Francis Jones. For services to the East Lancashire Homes for Disabled Sailors and Soldiers.
- Frederick Adolphus Jones, Senior Executive Officer, Air Ministry.
- Hector Stanley Jones, Assistant Engineer, Pontypridd and Caerphilly District, South Wales Electricity Board.
- William Jones, Executive Officer, Welsh Board of Health.
- Major Joseph Pelham Kayll, District Commissioner for Sunderland, Boy Scouts Association.
- Bertie Oliver William Keech, Vice-Chairman, Luton Industrial Savings Committee.
- Fred Austen Keighley, County Civil Defence Organiser, Harrogate and District, West Riding of Yorkshire.
- Captain John Kelsall, Principal Station Radio Officer, Foreign Office.
- Charles William Keyse. For services to ex-servicemen in South East London.
- Maurice Kidd, Assistant General Secretary, Confederation of Shipbuilding and Engineering Unions.
- Mary Jane Kilgore, lately Sister in-charge, Outpatient Department, Royal Hospital, Sheffield.
- William Henry Kimberlee, JP, Member of Kidderminster Rural District Council.
- Benjamin Kinnaird, Senior Executive Officer, Forestry Commission (Scotland).
- David Kirk, Executive Officer, Ministry of Pensions and National Insurance.
- Sheila Margaret Knox, Head Occupational Therapist, Rampton Hospital, Ministry of Health.
- William James Jesse Lacey, General Buyer, British Broadcasting Corporation.
- Winifred Legge, Secretary to the Chief Constable of Southampton.
- Walter Lewis, Skipper of a Trawler.
- William Arthur Lightfoot, Works Mechanical Engineer, Pilkington Brothers Ltd., Kirk Sandall, Doncaster.
- Cecil Lingwood. For services to the British Legion.
- Frederick Hedley Linnitt, Inspector of Taxes (Higher Grade), Board of Inland Revenue.
- George William Littlefield, lately Executive Office, Civil Service Commission.
- Observer Lieutenant Marjorie Lloyd, Duty Controller, No. 21 Group, Royal Observer Corps.
- James Loughrey. For public services in Larne.
- Emily Charlotte Eileen Loyd. For political services in Peckham and the Isle of Wight.
- Herbert Otto Luxford, lately Higher Executive Officer, War Office.
- Pamela Dorothy Lynes, Clerical Officer Secretary, Air Ministry.
- William Alexander McClintock, Deputy Principal, Ministry of Health and Local Government for Northern Ireland.
- Marjorie McCulloch, MB, ChB, JP, Centre Organiser, Dumbarton, Women's Voluntary Service.
- John Charles McDonald, Chairman, Mid and West Wiltshire Disablement Advisory Committee.
- John McDougall, Member, Board of Management, Glasgow Royal Infirmary.
- John Robert Macdonald Mackay, lately Grade 3 Officer, Ministry of Labour.
- Annie McLachlan. For political services in Glasgow.
- Alexander Reid McLaren, Chief Engineer, MV Zealand, Currie Line Ltd., Edinburgh.
- William Dickson McLaren, Manager, Post Office Railway (London), General Post Office.
- Maud Magnus, Joint County Organiser, Northumberland, Women's Voluntary Service.
- Jeannie Mary Mann, JP, Alderman, East Suffolk County Council.
- Margaret Isobel Violet Mann, lately Principal, Physiotherapy Training School, Royal Infirmary, Edinburgh.
- Captain Richard James Markham, Government Clerk, Jersey.
- Cyril Arthur Martin, Head of Clothing and Footwear Department, Soundwell Technical College, Bristol.
- Herbert Horace Mason, Director, Player Mitchell & Breeden, Aston, Birmingham.
- Arthur Ernest Masters, Senior Wages Inspector (Grade 3), Ministry of Labour.
- Robert Matthews, Assistant Shipyard Manager, Harland & Wolff Ltd.
- Observer Commander William Henry Edward Matthews, Group Commandant, No. 17 Group, Royal Observer Corps.
- Bertha May Sutton-Mattocks. For political and public services in Richmond and Barnes.
- Lottie Maycock. For political services in Llandaff and Barry.
- Adam Douglas Fraser Menzies, MB, ChB. For political and public services in Lincolnshire.
- Robert Burns Miller, Executive Works Director, Thermal Syndicate Ltd.
- Mabel Milsom, Executive Officer, Ministry of Transport.
- William Edmund Minty, Fuel Department Manager, Birmingham Co-operative Society, Ltd.
- Alfred Emil Mischall, Chief Service Engineer, Electro-Hydraulics Ltd., Warrington, Lancashire.
- Edna Joyce Morrish. For voluntary social services in the Blofield and Flegg districts of Norfolk.
- Gladys Alice Moulder, Vice-Chairman, Kidderminster Savings Committee.
- Norman Spencer Mumby, Deputy Commissioner, Cheshire, St. John Ambulance Brigade.
- Stuart Jeffrey Ness, Senior Executive Officer, Scottish Home and Health Department.
- Joseph Paul Nightingale, Inspector of Works, No. 8 Works Area, Air Ministry.
- Henry James Olley, Cable Works Manager, Johnson & Phillips Ltd., Charlton.
- Donald Thomas Phillips Pain, Honorary Secretary, International Amateur Athletic Federation.
- Alfred Palmer, Vice-Chairman, King's Lynn Unit, Sea Cadet Corps.
- Cyril Walter Palmer, Technical Grade B, No. 248 Maintenance Unit, Royal Air Force, Chessington, Surrey.
- John Tough Paton, Industrial and Technical Officer, Technical Section, Scottish Council (Development and Industry).
- Edward George Claude Pauley, MC, Assistant Divisional Superintendent, Central Road Services, London Transport Executive.
- Robert Pearson, Civil Defence Officer, Midlothian County Council.
- Leonard Penniston, Staff Officer, Board of Inland Revenue.
- Frances Mary Perry, Organiser of Agricultural and Horticultural Education, Middlesex County Council.
- Sidney Phillips, Higher Executive Officer, Colonial Office.
- Leonard Ernest Pierce, in charge of project Design Office, Vosper Ltd., Portsmouth.
- Leonard Vincent Pike, JP, Member, Worcester County Agricultural Executive Committee.
- Marjory Jean Playfair, Vice-Chairman, Central Council, Scottish Women's Rural Institutes.
- Jolhn Wilkinson Potts, Member, North Riding of Yorkshire County Agricultural Executive Committee.
- Harold Kenneth Preston, JP, Actuary, Walsall and District Trustee Savings Bank.
- Charles Price, Councillor, Breconshire County Council.
- Herbert William Pulham, Clerical Officer, War Office.
- John Reginald Pyne, Labour Manager, National Gas Turbine Establishment, Pyestock, Ministry of Aviation.
- Sarah Doris Quick, Divisional Director, Torquay Division, Devon Branch, British Red Cross Society.
- Betty Randall, Executive Officer, HM Treasury.
- Clarence Rawling, Secretary, East Yorkshire Motor Services Ltd.
- Latimer Rees, HM District Inspector of Mines and Quarries, South Western Division, Ministry of Power.
- Richard Rees, Commissioner for Wales, National Savings Committee.
- Lillian Reid. For political and public services in Staffordshire.
- William John Reid, Staff Officer, Ministry of Finance for Northern Ireland.
- Clifford Riley, Area Engineer, Cambridge Telephone Area, General Post Office.
- Mary Monica Robson, Teacher, London County Council Hanover Infants' School, Islington.
- Henry John Rogers, Executive Officer, Ministry of Housing and Local Government.
- William Rogers, Senior Executive Officer, Ministry of Power.
- William Allan Critchley Roope, Honorary Secretary, Port Talbot Savings Committee.
- Ruth Gilpin Roper, JP, Alderman, Richmond Borough Council, North Riding of Yorkshire.
- Winston Hugh Rowe, Director, English Forestry Association.
- Jean Wilhelma Rowntree, Head, Further Education Unit, British Broadcasting Corporation.
- Eustace Leonard Russ, Higher Executive Officer, No. 27 Maintenance Unit, Royal Air Force, Shawbury, Shropshire.
- George Ernest Ryder, Teacher and Bandmaster, Central Secondary Boys' School, Darlington.
- Thomas Henry Sanders, Inspector of Taxes (Higher Grade), Board of Inland Revenue.
- John Leslie Saville, Senior Vehicle Examiner, Eastern Traffic Area, Cambridge, Ministry of Transport.
- Julia Elsie Scholes. For political services in Leeds.
- William John Scoble, Head Postmaster, Hitchin and Letchworth, Hertfordshire.
- William Scott, Assistant Firemaster, South-Eastern Area Fire Brigade, Scotland.
- Eva May Seacroft, Clerical Officer, Northern Command Pay Office, York, War Office.
- Violet Constance Sharpe. For political land public services in Somerset.
- Tom Shaw, Honorary Secretary, Southall Local Savings Committee.
- Edith Sheppey, lately Secretary, The Fruit and Vegetable Canning and Quick Freezing Research Association.
- Ada Catherine Shone. For political services in Caernarvonshire.
- Robert Michael Short, Headmaster, Victoria Road County Primary School, Ashford, Kent.
- Claire Evelyn Simon, Honorary Secretary, Hampstead Area, Forces Help Society and Lord Roberts Workshops.
- John Simpson, District Inspector, Royal Ulster Constabulary.
- William Charles Skinner, Surveyor, Birmingham 3rd District, Board of Customs and Excise.
- Frank Arthur Smith, Motor Transport Officer, Civil Defence Department, Home Office.
- George Smith, Station Master, Glasgow (Central), Scottish Region, British Railways.
- Gladys Ann Smith, lately Surgical Ward Sister, Charing Cross Hospital.
- Louise Emily Smith, Chairman, Fareham Street Groups Savings Sub-Committee.
- Mary Kerr Campbell Smith, Chairman, North Ayrshire Local Savings Committee.
- William Robert Smith, Secretary, Barrow-in-Furness Branch, British Legion.
- Commander Rodney Mylius Spencer, Royal Navy (Retired), Inspector, HM Coastguard, South Western Division, Ministry of Transport.
- Maud Isabel Sophia Stangroome, Higher Executive Officer, Telephone Manager's Office, East Area, General Post Office.
- Geoffrey Huson Stephenson, Chief Project Engineer, EMI Electronics Ltd., Hayes, Middlesex.
- Eric Charles Pegler Stevens. For political and public services in Derbyshire.
- Henry Gordon Stokes, MM, Higher Executive Officer, Ministry of Defence.
- Florence Alice Stoneham. For political services in Suffolk.
- Kathleen Ellen Stroud, lately Shorthand Typist Grade I, Admiralty.
- Ian Moir Meiklejohn Summers, Experimental Officer, Royal Radar Establishment, Malvern, Ministry of Aviation.
- Elizabeth Ewing Telford, Higher Executive Officer, Department of Agriculture and Fisheries for Scotland.
- Muriel Blanche Thomas, Honorary Secretary, Blackpool Savings Committee.
- Thomas Haydn Thomas, Conductor, Pontardulais Choral Society.
- Albert Michael Thompson, MM, lately Auditor, County Courts Branch, Lord Chancellor's Department.
- Arthur Thompson, Chief Superintendent, Lancashire Constabulary.
- Philip Drummond Thompson, English Language Officer, British Council, Lagos.
- Daniel Ferguson Thomson, JP, Chairman, Thomsons (Carron) Ltd., Falkirk, Stirlingshire.
- Captain Samuel Thomson, Commodore Master, SS Martaban, P. Henderson & Co. Ltd., Glasgow.
- Cyril Cuthbert Thurrell, Chairman of Committee, No. 99 (Folkestone) Squadron, Air Training Corps.
- Lawrence David Tidy, Lately Cadet Administrative Officer, Territorial and Auxiliary Forces Association for the County of London.
- Sydney Charles Tingley, Regional Manager, Northern Region, Navy, Army and Air Force Institutes.
- William Thomas Toten, Higher Executive Officer, Ministry of Transport.
- Gerald Charles Tout, Grade 4 Officer, Branch B, Foreign Office.
- Charles Tozer, Assistant Chief Officer, Durham County Fire Brigade.
- Captain Archibald Trace, Senior Pilot, Belfast Harbour Commissioners.
- Albert Henry Lancelot Trapnell, Principal Production Inspector, Admiralty.
- Joseph David Tucker, lately Regional Collector, Board of Inland Revenue.
- Sara Catherine Turnbull, Leader, Hohne Station, Young Men’s Christian Association, British Army of the Rhine.
- Walter Uffindell, Grade 4 Officer, Ministry of Labour.
- Mabel Elizabeth Unwin, Headmistress, Clarence County Infants' School, Stoke-on-Trent.
- William Henry Varley, Officer, Kendal 1st Station, Board of Customs and Excise.
- Norman Gresty Waine, Clerk of Brownhills Urban District Council, Staffordshire.
- Louis Charles Walker, Senior Assistant Chief Male Nurse, Glenside Hospital, Bristol.
- John Charles Wall, Chief Draughtsman, Coventry Works, Coventry Gauge & Tool Co., Ltd.
- Constance Vera Ware, Headmistress, Meonstoke Church of England Primary School, Hampshire.
- Stanley Frank Warren, Divisional Surveyor, Petersfield, Hampshire County Council.
- William Warwick, Grade 3 Officer, Ministry of Labour.
- Catherine Brodie Watson, Headmistress, Coulter Primary School, Lanarkshire.
- John William White, lately Civil Defence Officer, Derbyshire.
- William David White, Grade II Overseer, HM Stationery Office.
- Arthur Percy Whitehead, MC, Chairman of Committee, No. 124 (Hereford) Squadron, Air Training Corps.
- Edward Matthew Whitehead, Rolling Mill Superintendent, British Insulated Callender's Cables Ltd.
- Pattie May Whittle, Blind Shorthand Typist Grade I, Ministry of Education.
- Ruth Wier. For public services in County Antrim.
- John Henry Wightman, JP, Vice-Chairman, County Down Savings Committee.
- Philip Frank Williams, Field Officer Grade I, Ministry of Agriculture, Fisheries and Food.
- Thomas John Williams, Superintendent and Deputy Chief Constable, Gwynedd Constabulary.
- Noel Henry Robert Wilson, Executive Officer, Ministry of Education.
- Captain William Carment Wilson, Master, SS Ben Lomond, Ben Line Steamers Ltd., Edinburgh.
- Walter Roy Wilthew. For political services in Stirlingshire.
- Frederick Wood. Chairman of Committee, No. 296 (Stoke Newington) Squadron, Air Training Corps.
- Tom Woodhouse, Negotiating Officer, Co-operative Union Ltd.
- Nevison Woods, Assistant Principal Clerk, Vote Office, House of Commons.
- Henry Ernest Wright, lately Grade 4 Officer, Ministry of Labour.
- Andrew Young, Member, West Cumberland Hospital Management Committee, Special Area Committee.
- James Douglas Atkinson, lately First Secretary and Consul, Her Majesty's Embassy, San José.
- Desmond Alexander Batwell, lately British Consul, Chiengmai.
- Major Clive Lane Bayliss, Third Secretary, Her Majesty's Embassy, Copenhagen.
- Norah Meryl Bidot, British subject resident in France.
- Henry Castle, British subject resident in the Lebanon.
- Elsie Clark, Superintendent of Typists, Her Majesty's Embassy, Bonn.
- Naomi Irene Clarke, lately Shorthand-Typist, Her Majesty's Embassy, Bangkok.
- Joyce Zillah Crewe, British subject resident in Brazil.
- Isabelle Pattison Cullen, Head of Speakers' Section, British Information Services, New York.
- Richard Thomas Edwards, Administrative Officer and Accountant, British Council, Iran.
- Frances Eleanor Mary Gertrude Woulfe Flanagan, Her Majesty's Vice-Consul, Oporto.
- Yves Guy Noel Gurney, British Vice-Consul, Turin.
- Leslie Sumner Haptie, British Vice-Consul, Lucerne.
- John Patrick Basil Hyde, British Vice-Consul, Istanbul.
- Phyllis Mary Iliffe, lately Her Majesty's Vice-Consul, Elisabethville.
- Clement Garnett Hampden-King, Her Majesty's Consul, Yokohama.
- James Selkirk Lees, Secretary, British Chamber of Commerce, Buenos Aires.
- Janet Latto Locke, Films Officer, Her Majesty's Embassy, Washington.
- Sidney Mittens, Commercial Officer, Her Majesty's Consulate-General, Cleveland.
- Joshua Monsonego, British Pro-Consul, Fez.
- Adib George Shibley, Assistant Press Officer, Her Majesty's Embassy, Amman.
- Mary Elizabeth Day Wakely, Matron, British-American Hospital, Madrid.
- Alexander John Walker, Assistant Information Officer, Her Majesty's Embassy, Rome.
- Henry Russell Wotton, British Vice-Consul, Oran.
- Samuel Alfred Wylie, lately locally engaged Clerical Officer, Grade II, Her Majesty's Embassy, Washington.
- Elizabeth May Angliss, Honorary Secretary, Children's Welfare Association, State of Victoria.
- Sidney Thomas Baker. For services to the British community in East Pakistan.
- Colonel Thomas William Bartley, ED. For services to ex-servicemen and women in the Newcastle District, State of New South Wales.
- Thelma Black, MB, ChM, Deputy Medical Superintendent, Morisset Mental Hospital, State of New South Wales.
- James Cyril Bradley. For services to the British community in Eastern India.
- Elizabeth Kate Bray, JP. For social welfare services in the State of South Australia.
- Vernon Hancock Dawe, Chief Commissioner for the Boy Scouts Association in the State of Western Australia.
- Ellis Middleton Elsworthy. For services to grapegrowers in the State of South Australia.
- Ethel May Field. For social welfare services in the Thebarton District, State of South Australia.
- Thomas Henry Halton, formerly Shire Clerk, Lake Macquarie Shire Council, State of New South Wales. For services to local government.
- Charles Greenlaw Hamilton. For services to the Arts in the State of Western Australia.
- Penzie Isabella Harris. For social welfare services in the Louth District, State of New South Wales.
- John Hoey, Chairman, Allora Shire Council State of Queensland.
- Thomas Henry Hurrey, JP, Councillor, Shire of Whittlesea, State of Victoria.
- Frederick Leslie Kerr, Director of Emergency Fire Services, State of South Australia.
- Thomas Lavender, JP. For public services in the State of Western Australia.
- Ian Douglas McDonald, City Engineer and Building Surveyor, City of Geelong, State of Victoria.
- Sarah Charlotte Macdonald, ARRC, Matron in Charge of the Archibald Girls Hostel, New Farm, Brisbane, State of Queensland.
- Edward Alexander Mackenzie, JP, in recognition of his services to the community on King Island, State of Tasmania.
- Rebecca Morton, of Gordonvale, State of Queensland. For social welfare services.
- Edward Joseph O'Brien, of Mossman, State of Queensland. For services to the sugar industry.
- Margaret Gordon Parker, Reception Secretary at the Headquarters in Edinburgh of the Royal Over-Seas League.
- Mary Sheila McConnel Paterson, of the British Red Cross Society. For services in Cyprus.
- Herbert James Ray, of Cairns, State of Queensland. For services to local government.
- Thomas George Retalic. For services to primary production in the State of South Australia.
- Florence Griffin Scrimshaw, of Alipore, Calcutta. For services to the British community in India.
- Herbert Gordon Skepper, Superintending Engineer (Design & Research), Public Works Department, Federation of Malaya.
- Ernest James Smith, Town Clerk, City of Footscray, State of Victoria.
- Maurice Solomons, of Sydney, State of New South Wales. For services to charitable movements.
- Arthur Ruddick Stafford. For public services in the State of New South Wales.
- Kenneth Gordon Summers, formerly Acting Deputy Superintendent, Royal Federation of Malaya Police.
- Edward Henry Tomlinson, formerly Superintendent, Hobart City Mission, State of Tasmania.
- Reginald Knox Tompson, of Indooroopilly, Brisbane, State of Queensland. For services to the grazing industry.
- Joyce Winifred Vickery, Botanist, Department of Agriculture, State of New South Wales.
- Agnes Elise Walker, formerly Librarian, University of Ghana, Legon.
- Paul Douglas Watson, Honorary Secretary, Suffolk County Branch, The Victoria League.
- William Henry Watson. For services to charitable institutions in the State of Victoria.
- Dorothy Lilian Williams, President of the Melbourne Young Women's Christian Association, State of Victoria.
- Annie Marie Winders, of Coolangatta, State of Queensland. For social welfare services.
- Captain James Woods, one of the pioneers of civil aviation in the State of Western Australia.
- George Glyn Davies, Administrative Officer, Northern Rhodesia.
- Roland Awbrey Hill, District Commission, Samfya, Northern Rhodesia.
- Grace Monica Abdool. For services to music in Trinidad.
- Maurice Abela, Principal Government Statistician and Principal Electoral Officer, Malta.
- Arthur George Edgeworth Adams, Overseer of Mental Hospital, Bermuda.
- Christopher Albert Adams. For public services in Jamaica.
- James Augustus Agard. For public services in British Guiana.
- Rupert Maurice Arscott, Secretary, Central Hurricane Relief Committee, Jamaica.
- Azizuiiah Awan. For public services in Uganda.
- William Leftwich Barton, MB, ChB, Assistant Director of Medical Services, Zanzibar.
- Robert Eldred Bennett, Social Development Officer, British Honduras.
- Edward Frank Brewer, Forestry Superintendent, Gambia.
- John Victor Brown, Labour Officer, Bahamas.
- Norman Eustace Cameron, Deputy Principal, Queens College, Georgetown, British Guiana.
- Carol Lesbia Campbell, Administrative Officer, British Honduras.
- Herbert Campbell. For public services in Uganda.
- Chang Chin Teh, Head of Chinese Section, British Information Services, Singapore.
- Chau Wa-shang, Assessor, Inland Revenue Department, Hong Kong.
- Anacreon Cloete. For public services in Kenya.
- Solomon Kakapa Dakei, Senior Laboratory and X-ray Assistant, British Solomon Islands Protectorate.
- Marie Delaitre. For social services in Mauritius.
- Roger Delpech. For public services in the Seychelles.
- Nichhabhai Rambhai Desai, lately Accountant, East African Common Services Organisation.
- Basil Matovu Dungu, Senior Education Officer, Uganda.
- Major Arthur David Charles Eales, Training Officer, Eastern Aden Protectorate.
- Eben Evans, lately British Council's representative in Gambia.
- Ethel Lucy Feast, Registry Assistant, Ministry of Health, Kenya.
- Robin Giffard, District Officer, Kenya.
- Frederick Edward Mouncy Gilfillan, lately Head Postmaster, Mombasa, Kenya.
- Henry George Grist, War Department Land Agent, St. Lucia.
- Winifred Eulalie Hewitt, Chief Children's Officer, Jamaica.
- David Harold Jordan, Administrative Officer, Hong Kong.
- Abdul Karim Abdul Hai, lately Temporary Clerk, Treasury, Aden.
- Nelson Frank Mikisa Kusambiza, Senior Labour Officer, Uganda.
- John Williamson Kuye. For public services in Gambia.
- Reverend Brother Lambert, Principal, Marist Brothers' High School, Suva, Fiji.
- Lau Mei-yuk, Matron, Pok Oi Hospital, Hong Kong.
- Blanche Lewis, District Health Visitor, Trinidad.
- John Clement Malone, formerly Federal Personnel Officer, The West Indies.
- Douglas Smeaton Manning, Executive Engineer, British Honduras.
- Aseri Koroisamanunu Manulevu, Assistant Medical Officer, Fiji.
- John Richard Masson, Administrative Officer, Swaziland.
- Chairles Alfred May, Senior Maintenance Superintendent, East African Veterinary Research Organisation.
- Vincent Gonsalves Menezes. For public services in British Guiana.
- Chief Letsie Koabeng Motsoene Molapo, Principal Chief of Leribe, Basutoland.
- Frederick Oliver Moody, Marketing Officer, British Honduras.
- William Muir, Senior Forester, Kenya.
- Robert Spence Murdoch, Diesel Superintendent, Bahamas Electricity Corporation.
- Isaac Reuben Nderitu, Secretary, African District Council, Nyeri, Kenya.
- Khan Saheb Soraibjee Pallonjee Patel. For public services in Aden.
- Rambhai Haribhad Patel, Accounting Assistant, East African Railways and Harbours.
- Roland Charlies Peagram, District Officer, Uganda.
- Dorothy Mary Foster Pickford. For public services in Kenya.
- Peter Herbert Piggott, Superintendent, Special Constabulary, Zanzibar.
- Wilfred Podesta, Secretary, War Damage Commission, Reconstruction and Housing, Malta.
- William Henry Hudson Redpath, JP. For public services in Jamaica.
- John Lockwood Roper, Lands Officer, Uganda.
- May Johnston Ross. For public services in Antigua.
- Pansy Ouida Rowley, Social Welfare Officer, Grenada.
- Antonia Russo. For social services in Gibraltar.
- Bbrahim Abdo Shubaili, Junior Executive Officer, Aden.
- Murugasupillai Somasundram, lately Administrative Assistant, Sarawak.
- Moss Marie Eveline Stephens, BEM. For public services in Jamaica.
- Leo Alexander Sullivan, Supervisor of Grounds, University College of the West Indies.
- Muip bin Tabib. For public services in Sarawak.
- Helena Maud Beatrice Taitt, lately Headmistress, St Michael's Girls' School, Barbados.
- Henry Richard Tappenden, Superintendent of Prisons, Hong Kong.
- Benjamin Cogo Thema, Principal of Moeng College, Bechuanaland Protectorate.
- Charles Angel Vasquez, Commandant of the Special Constabulary, Gibraltar.
- Edward Waddington, Administrative Officer, Basutoland.
- King-wai Wong, Superintendent of Mails, Post Office Department, Hong Kong.
- William Wright, Senior Superintendent of Police, Zanzibar.
- Yap Fui Yong, lately Superintendent of Customs, North Borneo.
- Yee Wah Hing, Assistant Engineer, Public Works Department, North Borneo.

Nyasaland

- Frederica Mary Klamborowski. For public services in Nyasaland.
- William Chiswakaita Mkandawire. For public services in Nyasaland.

Southern Rhodesia

- Ruth Sylvia Cameron, of Fort Victoria, Southern Rhodesia. For social welfare services, especially to African Women's Homecraft Clubs.
- Margaret Davies, a social welfare worker, of Salisbury, Southern Rhodesia.
- Gary Hocking, of Bulawayo, Southern Rhodesia; a World Champion Motor Cyclist.
- Ian MacLachlan, of the Umvukwes District, Southern Rhodesia. For public services.
- Magwewe Garnett Madonka, Court Interpreter, High Court, Bulawayo, Southern Rhodesia.
- Robert John Silamba, Superintendent of the African Probation Hostel, Luveve, Bulawayo, Department of Social Welfare, Southern Rhodesia.

Northern Rhodesia

- Jason Achiume. For public services in Northern Rhodesia.
- James Wells Betts. For services to Trade Unionism in Northern Rhodesia.
- John Denis Orme Bird, Superintendent of Police, Northern Rhodesia.

=== Order of the Companions of Honour (CH) ===
- The Right Honourable Patrick George Thomas, Baron Hailes, GBE, Parliamentary Secretary to HM Treasury and Government Chief Whip, 1951–1955. Minister of Works, 1955–1957. Governor-General and Commander-in-Chief of the West Indies, since 1957.

=== Companion of the Imperial Service Order (ISO) ===
Home Civil Service

- Albert Astbury, lately Chief Executive Officer, Ministry of Pensions and National Insurance. (Nottingham.)
- Leslie George Ballard, Chief Executive Officer, National Assistance Board. (Epsom, Surrey.)
- Edward Unwin Brockway, Chief Executive Officer, Scottish Home and Health Department. (Edinburgh 9.)
- Charles James Cameron, Assistant Staff Engineer, General Post Office. (London N.W.9.)
- Philip Richard Clipsham, OBE, lately Principal, Commonwealth Relations Office. (Trudoxhill, Somerset.)
- Thomas John Endersbee, Grade 2 Officer, Ministry of Labour. (Radlett, Hertfordshire.)
- Harold Walter William Freeman, Deputy Director of Contracts, Ministry of Aviation. (Harrow, Middlesex.)
- Charles Gallehawk, Chief Executive Officer, Ministry of Agriculture, Fisheries and Food. (London S.E.9.)
- Anthony Octavius Gibson, Senior Inspector, Board of Customs and Excise. (Worthing, Sussex.)
- George William Henlen, MBE, Chief Executive Officer, Department of Technical Co-operation. (Ashtead, Surrey.)
- Stanley Fennell Horne, lately Senior Chief Executive Officer, War Office. (Pinner, Middlesex.)
- Joseph Howieson, Registrar of Death Duties, Scotland, Board of Inland Revenue. (Edinburgh 10.)
- James Wenman Bassell Ireson, Chief Executive Officer, Ministry of Education. (Bournemouth.)
- Joseph Stanley Jephcott, Regional Commissioner, National Savings Committee. (Clevedon, Somerset.)
- Arthur James Long, MBE, Senior Chief Executive Officer, HM Stationery Office. (Ilford, Essex.)
- James McCree, Principal Regional Officer, Ministry of Health. (London S.W.14.)
- Esca Hunt Nash, Superintending Engineer, Ministry of Works. (London S.W.20.)
- Leslie Thomas Norman, Chief Executive Officer, Home Office. (Twickenham, Middlesex.)
- Sydney Robert Skinner, lately Principal Executive Officer, Ministry of Transport. (Brighton, Sussex.)
- Edward Alexis Gilbert Taylor, MBE, lately Grade 2 Officer, Branch B, Foreign Office. (Datchet, Buckinghamshire.)
- George Tideswell, OBE, Principal Executive Officer, Air Ministry. (Ewell, Surrey.)

Australian States

- Harold Carter Chipman, Secretary to the Law Department, State of Victoria.
- Douglas Were Fraser, Public Service Commissioner, State of Queensland.
- George Aubrey Jessup, Registrar-General of Deeds, State of South Australia.

Southern Rhodesia

- Richard John Powell, Native Commissioner, Native Affairs Department, Southern Rhodesia,

Overseas Civil Service

- Evan Lloyd Munroe, Commissioner of Income Tax, Jamaica.
- Ernest Ottey Panton, MBE, Assistant Administrator, Cayman Islands.
- Ivan Hugh Seelig, Permanent Secretary, Ministry of Labour, Health and Housing, British Guiana.
- Aubrey Vincent Sprott, Marketing Officer, St. Vincent.
- Jayantilal Umedram Thakore, Establishment Officer, Uganda.

=== British Empire Medal (BEM) ===
Military Division

Royal Navy

- Sick Berth Chief Petty Officer Geoffery Allan Bowyer, P/MX 49940.
- Chief Petty Officer (G.I.) Arthur Quantrill Bryant, D/JX 150852.
- Chief Petty Officer Writer Henry John Chipperfield, P/MX 49742.
- Stores Chief Petty Officer (S) Donald Stanley Clarke, P/MX 841139.
- Aircraft Artificer First Class Gordon Leonard Fielder, L/FX 670073.
- Quartermaster Sergeant Cyril Clarence Robert Gilbert-Wood, Po/X 3410, Royal Marines.
- Chief Petty Officer (G.I.) Richard Kenneth Grant, P/JX 157062.
- Chief Petty Officer Royce Holdsworth, D/JX 155474.
- Chief Engine Room Artificer George Frederick Mace, D/MX 802289.
- Chief Petty Officer Cook (S) Anthony Mallia, E/MX 754476.
- Chief Communication Yeoman George Patrick Mayers, P/JX 153367.
- Chief Wren Cook (S) Kathleen Violet Ada Moth, 49304, Women's Royal Naval Service.
- Sergeant Thomas Gabriel Oliver, Po/X 6081, Royal Marines.
- Chief Wren Welfare Violet Martha Perrin, 83822, Women's Royal Naval Service.
- Chief Engine Room Artificer Marshall Ronald Plummer, D/MX 53143.
- Electrical Artificer First Class David Llewellyn Powell, P/MX 56124.
- Marine William Haydn Price, RM.14620, Royal Marines.
- Chief Aircraft Artificer Noel Clifford Smale, L/FX 75289.
- Chief Petty Officer Charles George Stebbing, P/JX 292831.
- Chief Radio Supervisor George Stray, P/JX 156363.
- Chief Petty Officer (G.I.) Gordon Francis Tansley, P/JX 712666.
- Chief Aircraft Artificer Arthur Titherington, L/FX 88000.
- Chief Petty Officer John Moffatt Watson, P/JX 138669.
- Chief Engine Room Artificer Leslie John Archibald Nizam Beatty Watson, D/MX 54721.
- Chief Aircraft Artificer Frank Webb L/FX 777897.
- Chief Petty Officer Duncan White, J.988506, Royal Naval Reserve.
- Jean Margaret Allan Workman, ARRC, Head Naval Nursing Auxiliary, Queen Alexandra's Royal Naval Nursing Service.

Army

- T/22555296 Corporal Desmond Patrick Arnold, Royal Army Service Corps.
- 1069484 Squadron Quartermaster-Corporal Albert Kenneth Ball, Royal Horse Guards (The Blues).
- 22243327 Sergeant Robert Baxter, The Royal Ulster Rifles, Territorial Army.
- LS/22815864 Warrant Officer Class II (local) Herbert Biddle, The Royal Warwickshire Regiment.
- 7961762 Sergeant Card Borley, Royal Armoured Corps.
- 22821323 Staff-Sergeant Roger (Frederick Brooker, Corps of Royal Electrical and Mechanical Engineers.
- 2622187 Sergeant Farnell Brunt, Grenadier Guards.
- LS/837105 Staff Sergeant (local) George Bulger, Royal Horse Artillery.
- 1874267 Warrant Officer Class II (acting) Frederick George Clark, Royal Regiment of Artillery.
- 22550159 Corporal Barry George William Clarke, Corps of Royal (Engineers.
- 22837132 Lance-Corporal John Henry Clayforth, Royal Corps of Signals.
- 22221010 Staff-Sergeant Ronald Cullen, The Royal Sussex Regiment.
- 23251824 Sergeant Leonard Benjamin Davies, Royal Army Ordnance Corps.
- S/14497306 Staff-Sergeant Donald Dowey, Royal Army Service Corps.
- S/22249409 Staff-Sergeant Ronald Fairs, Royal Army Service Corps.
- 22273239 Squadron Quartermaster-Sergeant John Ernest Foster, Royal Armoured Corps.
- S/22547994 Sergeant Eric Headley Fox, Royal Army Service Corps.
- 22114418 Staff-Sergeant Cyril Thomas Gibbon, Royal Army Educational Corps.
- T/841222 Company Quartermaster-Sergeant Harry Ronald Gilham, Royal Army Service Corps, Territorial Army.
- 22983824 Sergeant Donald Frank Goodyer, Royal Corps of Signals.
- 22812345 Sergeant Maurice Grange, Royal Pioneer Corps.
- 22997760 Sergeant John Harvey, Royal Corps of Signals.
- 2058119 Sergeant Alexander Hendry, Corps of Royal Engineers.
- 23382780 Corporal William Raymond Henry Hill, Royal Army Service Corps.
- 6410013 Sergeant William George Hobden, MM, The Royal Irish Fusiliers (Princess Victoria's).
- 22953551 Corporal Tony Michael Hodsman, Corps of Royal Military Police.
- 14415467 Staff-Sergeant William James Johnston, Army Physical Training Corps.
- EA/18125942 Staff-Sergeant Meshack Kipto, 1st Signal Squadron, The King's African Rifles.
- 23220604 Sergeant (acting) Stanley Albert Morden, Corps of Royal Electrical and Mechanical Engineers.
- 22996001 Sergeant Robert Alan Peake, Royal Corps of Signals.
- 6457659 Staff-Sergeant Robert Clifford Leonard Peall, The Royal Fusiliers (City of London Regiment), Territorial Army.
- 2656442 Staff-Sergeant George Albert Alexander Prior, Irish Guards.
- 5774088 Sergeant (acting) Maurice Postle Randell, Corps of Royal Electrical and Mechanical Engineers.
- 6531 Warrant Officer Class II (acting) Adbulla Yeslam Saidi, 4th Battalion, The Federal Army.
- T/22774129 Sergeant Ronald William Sanders, Royal Army Service Corps.
- 7048108 Staff-Sergeant (acting) Basil William Saunders, The Royal Irish Fusiliers (Princess Victoria's).
- S/159263 Staff-Sergeant Raymond Douglas Smith, Royal Army Service Corps.
- 22546396 Sergeant Robert George Smith, Army Catering Corps.
- 22542915 Sergeant (acting) Kenneth John Somerset, Corps of Royal Electrical and Mechanical Engineers.
- 21146144 Sergeant (clerk) Surjalal Rai, 10th Princess Mary's Own Gurkha Rifles.
- 22824521 Staff-Sergeant Thalis Thoukydides, Corps of Royal Electrical and Mechanical Engineers.
- 758766 Staff-Sergeant George Frederick Willoughby, Royal Regiment of Artillery, Territorial Army.

Royal Air Force

- 925103 Flight Sergeant William Frederick Angel.
- 4118594 Flight Sergeant (Acting Warrant Officer) Frederick Edward William Bailey.
- 568610 Flight Sergeant Kenneth Basil Brock.
- 1797560 Flight Sergeant Thomas Anthony Daly.
- 520192 Flight Sergeant David Ernest Thomas Davies.
- 573129 Flight Sergeant Alfred Charles Davis.
- 541540 Flight Sergeant John Copeland Ellis.
- 1795044 Flight Sergeant Harold Evans, DFM.
- 624423 Flight Sergeant Edgar Falconer.
- 591832 Flight Sergeant George Falconer.
- 529057 Flight Sergeant Stanley William Hamilton-Farey.
- 4005098 Flight Sergeant William Simpson Ferguson.
- 1722859 Flight Sergeant William Charles Gordon Gausden.
- 575690 Flight Sergeant Raymond Victor Hayter.
- 1302818 Flight Sergeant John Vincent Hubbard.
- 625041 Flight Sergeant Reginald Taylor Hudson.
- 570895 Flight Sergeant (now Warrant Officer) Walter Harry Jelley.
- 2154605 Flight Sergeant Betty Matthews, Women's Royal Air Force.
- 532574 Flight Sergeant Charles Kendall Narracott.
- 568609 Flight Sergeant Francis Desmond O'Brien.
- 519085 Flight Sergeant Wilfred Edward Richards.
- 634744 Flight Sergeant Frank Salt.
- 1661614 Flight Sergeant Frederick Joseph William Smith, RAF Regiment.
- 520518 Chief Technician George Edward Baddock.
- 582284 Chief Technician Alfred Ernest Bryan.
- 571156 Chief Technician Walter Edwin Fowler.
- 541322 Chief Technician Edmund Victor Oxtoby.
- 508535 Chief Technician Lambert Samuel Reeson.
- 539998 Chief Technician Russell Whyte.
- 4012054 Chief Technician Edward Allbon Winter.
- 518871 Sergeant Ronald Stanton Bailey.
- 2363136 Sergeant David Redvers Burgess.
- 1921215 Sergeant Robert Smith Erskine.
- 1499044 Sergeant Reginald Lowes.
- 585771 Sergeant Leonard Herbert Pearson.
- 4022158 Sergeant Leslie Horace Southey.
- 2205169 Sergeant Geoffrey Towers.
- 3504105 Sergeant Bramwell James Wager.
- 585001 Senior Technician Alan John Letts.
- 4237318 Corporal Barrie Richard Dimbleby.
- 4040431 Corporal Harold Joseph Woodcock.

Civil Division

United Kingdom

- Robert Anderson, Chief Inspector, Blackburn Borough Police. (Blackburn.)
- Adam Baird, Foreman, Mechanical Transport Station, Royal Air Force, Lyneham. (Brinkworth, Wiltshire.)
- Ethel Barber, Honorary Collector, Street Savings Group, Manchester.
- Sidney Clifford Baston, General Foreman, Berkeley Nuclear Power Station, South Western Division, Central Electricity Generating Board. (Bristol.)
- Robert McRither Batchelor, Foreman Fitter, Thomas C. Keay Ltd. (Dundee, Angus.)
- Harry Simon Beadle, Foreman, Vickers-Armstrongs (Aircraft) Ltd., Weybridge. (Byfleet, Surrey.)
- Bernard David Beck, Senior Fire Officer, Ministry of Works. (Birmingham.)
- Arthur Percy Bell, School Staff Instructor, Combined Cadet Force, Merchant Taylors' School, Northwood, Middlesex.
- Samuel Bell, Head Foreman Fitter, Harland & Wolff Ltd., Belfast.
- Albert James Bicknell, Chief Inspector, Small Electric Motors, Ltd., Beckenham, Kent.
- Laurance Amelia Billiet, Chief Supervisor, Continental Exchange, General Post Office. (London, W.C.2.)
- Robert George Bolam, Station Officer, Northumberland Fire Brigade. (Rothbury.)
- Ernest Briscoe, Shop Superintendent, John Thompson Ltd., Wolverhampton.
- Henry Victor Burwell, Senior Scientific Assistant, National Chemical Laboratory, Department of Scientific and Industrial Research. (London, W.6.)
- Alice Cave, Honorary Collector, Street Savings Group, Birmingham.
- John Henry Cawte, Wardroom Attendant, HMS Dolphin, Portsmouth.
- Llewellyn Charles, JP, Underground Workman, Hafod Colliery, North Western Division, National Coal Board. (Wrexham.)
- Henry Cheetham, Contractor and Back Ripper, Sutton Colliery, East Midlands Division, National Coal Board. (Sutton-in-Ashfield.)
- George Lawrence Chilton, Inspector, Telephones, General Post Office. (Harrow, Middlesex.)
- Lawrence George Clarke, Chargehand Mechanical Fitter, East Midlands Electricity Board. (Nottingham.)
- Montague Cooper, Civilian Stores Officer, Grade II, Command Ordnance Depot, War Office, Ashford, Kent.
- Arthur Cowley, Shaft Overman, Ryhope Colliery, Durham Division, National Coal Board. (Ryhope.)
- Edmund Albert Crompton, Principal Foreman of Stores, No. 25 Maintenance Unit, Royal Air Force, Hartlebury. (Kidderminster.)
- Douglas Cuff, Chargehand Fitter, Ministry of Aviation. (Mychett, Surrey.)
- Ernest Damms, Foreman in Charge, Steckel Mill, Rolling Mills Ltd. (Sheffield.)
- Edward Elliott Day, Principal Keeper, Start Point Lighthouse, Trinity Lighthouse Service. (Kingsbridge, Devonshire.)
- Frederick Ernest Drewitt, Engineering Technical Grade II, Ministry of Aviation. (Seaford, Sussex.)
- Robert John Duff, Farm Manager, Department of Agriculture and Fisheries for Scotland. (Stranraer, Wigtownshire.)
- Arthur William Edwards, Assistant Inspector, London Postal Region, General Post Office. (London, N.12.)
- Thomas Elder, Composite Worker, Bates Colliery, Northern (N. & C.) Division, National Coal Board. (Blyth, Northumberland.)
- William Arthur Charles Emmans, Overseas Telegraph Supervisor, International Telex Exchange, General Post Office. (South Mimms, Hertfordshire.)
- Thomas Entwistle, Chargehand Draughtsman, Vickers-Armstrongs (Shipbuilders) Ltd., Barrow-in-Furness.
- Ronald Stanley Evans, Superintendent, Garden Division, J. E. Shay Ltd. (Basingstoke, Hampshire.)
- Sidney Favell, First Hand Steel Melter, Brown, Lenox & Co. Ltd., Glamorgan. (Pontypridd.)
- Edward Field, Inspector, North Riding of Yorkshire Constabulary. (Northallerton.)
- John George Frelford, Non-Technical Grade III, Research Establishment, Harwell, United Kingdom Atomic Energy Authority. (Newbury.)
- Walter William Frederick Fry, Planner and Estimator, Vickers-Armstrongs (Engineers) Ltd. (Weymouth, Dorset.)
- Norah Cecilia Gallagher, Supervisor (F) Telephones, Douglas, Isle of Man, General Post Office.
- Henry Thomas Gandee, lately Chief Inspector of Waste, HM Stationery Office. (Wembley.)
- Horace Garton, Assistant Inspector, Oakham, General Post Office.
- Robert Spitt Gilfillan, Janitor, Denend Primary School, Cardenden, Fife.
- Donald Gordon, Herdsman of Hereford Cattle. (Marden.)
- James Frederick Gorrod, Flight Foreman, Westland Aircraft Co. Ltd., White Waltham. (Maidenhead, Berkshire.)
- Stephen Gough, Telephone Operator, Warrington Power Station, North West, Merseyside and North Wales Region, Central Electricity Generating Board. (Warrington.)
- Albert Haines, Head Gardener, France, Northern Region, Commonwealth War Graves Commission.
- Thomas Robert Hall, Sergeant, Royal Ulster Constabulary. (Lisburn, County Antrim.)
- Ernest Harvey, Inspector, Air Ministry Constabulary, Rocket Propulsion Establishment, Westcott, Buckinghamshire.
- William Ernest Harvey, Master, East Goodwin Light Vessel, Trinity House Light Vessel Service. (Penzance, Cornwall.)
- John Ernest Heath, Foreman Gardener, Ellbridge Experimental Horticulture Station, Ministry of Agriculture, Fisheries and Food. (Saltash, Cornwall.)
- David Hennis, Service Engineer, Grade I, Bristol Aircraft Ltd., Bristol.
- Alfred George Hill, Marker-Off, Vickers Armstrongs (Engineers) Ltd., Crayford, Kent.
- Nellie Edith Hoar, Chief Supervisor, Slough Telephone Exchange, General Post Office.
- Philip Louis Hodgson, Foreman of Trades (General), Royal Air Force, Middleton St. George. (Darlington.)
- Arthur William Harold Holland, Superintendent, Printing Factory, Navy, Army and Air Force Institutes. (Edgware, Middlesex.)
- Ronald George Holloway, Non-Technical Class, Grade I, Royal Ordnance Factory, Chorley.
- George Ernest Holter, Forester, Friston Forest, Forestry Commission. (Seaford, Sussex.)
- Harry Edward Stephen Hunt, Civilian Warrant Officer, No. 45F (Worthing) Squadron, Air Training Corps. (Worthing.)
- John Hunt, MM, Surface Foreman, Hamsterley Colliery, Durham Division, National Coal Board. (Newcastle-upon-Tyne.)
- Cyril Jackson, Inspector, Aeronautical Inspection Department, Jessop-Saville, Ltd., Sheffield.
- Hannah Cook Jenkins, lately Forewoman, Finishing Department, Smith & McLaurin Ltd. (Elderslie, Renfrewshire.)
- Thomas Edward Jennings, Permanent Chargeman of Joiners, HM Dockyard, Portsmouth.
- Albert Jermy, Map Maker, Royal National Institute for the Blind. (Wembley.)
- William John Judge, Industrial Electrician, Ministry of Works. (London, SW2.)
- Percival James Kean, Estate Foreman and Reservoir Keeper, Hodder Water Works, Fylde Water Board. (Slaidburn, Clitheroe.)
- Patrick Kelly, Engineers' Storekeeper, SS Sylvania, Cunard Steam Ship Co. Ltd. (Liverpool.)
- Kenneth Rowland Kemp, Inspector, West Central District Office, General Post Office. (London, N.14.)
- Frederick George Kenward, Chief Officer, Class I, HM Prison, Durham.
- Ernest William Victor Kingston, Head Chancery Messenger, HM Embassy, Berne.
- Agnes Mary Kirton, Deputy County Organiser, Durham, Women's Voluntary Service. (Chester-le-Street.)
- William Redvere Ladner, Foreman (Technical Grade II), Admiralty Compass Observatory. (Datchet, Buckinghamshire.)
- John Thomas Latham, Sub Postmaster, Skelmersdale, Ormskirk, Lancashire.
- Cheong Leong, Overseer, Grade I, HM Dockyard, Singapore.
- Hilda Long, Honorary Collector, South Burgess Hill School Savings Group, Sussex.
- Dorothy Gwendoline Lowe, Honorary Collector, Merthyr Vale Church Sunday School Savings Group, Glamorganshire.
- David Charles McBride, Leading Man, Navy Works Department, Admiralty, Londonderry.
- William John Ogden McCleave, Chief Warder, Science Museum, Ministry of Education. (London SW12.)
- James McClelland, Plant Supervisory Engineer, Wm. C. Gray & Sons Ltd., Ayr.
- Hugh Campbell McCrea, Blind Telephonist, Ministry of Labour and National Insurance for Northern Ireland. (Belfast)
- Matilda McGregor, Head Female Attendant, The Rowans Residential Home, Dundee.
- John Howden McGrouther, Station Officer, Fife Fire Brigade. (Dunfermline.)
- John Macintyre, Technical Class, Grade II, Royal Ordnance Factory, Bishopton. (Glasgow.)
- Peter Magellan, Foreman Finisher, John Hastie & Co. Ltd., Greenock.
- Lilian Honor Major, Honorary Collector, Street and Village Savings Groups, Huntingdonshire. (Peterborough.)
- John Davenport Marriott, Sub-Postmaster, Littleton Drew, Chippenham, Wiltshire.
- Gladys Mary Marsh, W.V.S. Member, Welfare Section, Civil Defence Corps, Lancashire. (Liverpool.)
- William Joseph Matthews, Station Officer, Devon Fire Brigade. (Teignmouth.)
- Frederick George Mawhinney, Sub-District Commandant, Ulster Special Constabulary. (Belfast.)
- William Mill, Brusher, Aitken Colliery, Scottish Division, National Coal Board. (Kelty.)
- Walter Leslie Mills, Technical Grade III, 32 Base Workshop, R.E.M.E., War Office. (Didcot, Berkshire.)
- George William Morton, Chief Observer, Post 2/M.1, No. 2 Group, Royal Observer Corps. (Graffham, Sussex.)
- David Ernest Moth, Batman, Staff College, War Office, Camberley.
- Isabella Marchant Moyse, Assistant Cook, Ear, Nose and Throat Hospital, Newcastle-upon-Tyne.
- Ada Emily Muddell, Supervisor, Telephone Exchange, London (Heathrow) Airport, Ministry of Aviation. (Hounslow, Middlesex.)
- Edward Charles Newman, Deputy Head Security Guard, HM Treasury. (London SE27.)
- George Newton, Volunteer-in-Charge, Coast Life Saving Corps, Lydd, Kent.
- Bertram James Edward Nightingale, Inspector, Head Post Office, Crawley, Sussex.
- Leslie John Norris, Civilian Warrant Officer, No. 444 (Shoreditch) Squadron, Air Training Corps. (London E2.)
- Frank Edward Nuttall, Assistant Divisional Officer, Bolton Fire Brigade. (Bolton.)
- John Joseph O'Leary, Chief Inspector, Liverpool City Police.
- Mejnir Parker, District Nurse-Midwife, Berkshire County Council. (Wantage.)
- Harold Parkinson, Overseer, Head Post Office, Preston, Lancashire.
- Walter Parnham, Foreman Slaughterman, Shipley, Yorkshire. (Baildon.)
- Sidney Pattinson, Machine Shop Operator and Method Planner, Samuel Denison & Son, Ltd., Leeds.
- John Smart Perkins, Process and General Supervisory Class, Grade II, Royal Ordnance Factory, Bridgwater, Somerset. (Highbridge.)
- Mary Philp, Sub-Postmistress, Gargunnock, Stirling.
- Reginald Charles Pockett, Leader, Ramblers' Boys' Club, Gloucester.
- Charles Sidney Pritchard, Deputy, Wyrley No. 3 Colliery, West Midlands Division, National Coal Board. (Great Wyrley.)
- Charles Proctor, Colliery Overman, Snowdown Colliery, South Eastern Division, National Coal Board. (Dover.)
- Harold Norman Ratcliffe, Foreman Mason, J. Laing & Co., Ltd., Coventry Cathedral. (Wolverhampton.)
- Iris Hilda Raymont, Chief Officer, Class II, HM Prison, Cardiff.
- Frederick Rees, Production Shop Foreman, Morris Motors Ltd. (Llanelly.)
- George Rosie, Senior Master, North Carr Lightvessel, Northern Lighthouse Board. (Edinburgh.)
- Frederick Charles Rumble, Non-Technical Grade II, Royal Aircraft Establishment, Farnborough.
- Dorothy Ryder, Chief Supervisor (F), Head Post Office, Leeds.
- John Charles Salmon, Sergeant, Metropolitan Police Force. (London, E10.)
- Dorothy Maud Saxby, Needle Mistress, Fountain Hospital, Tooting. (London, SW17.)
- John Schofield, Range Warden, Dechmont Ranges, Lanarkshire. (Cambuslang.)
- Walter John Manton Scott, Technical Assistant Class II, Telecommunications Liaison Group, War Office, Berlin.
- Annie Elizabeth Seeby, Sampler-Tester, Milk Service, Ministry of Agriculture, Fisheries and Food. (Reading.)
- Edwin Sharpe, Smallholder, Lindsey, Lincolnshire. (Skegness.)
- Arnold Shield, Foreman-Joiner, Greenwich Hospital, Alston, Cumberland.
- Dorothy Shinkfield, Deputy County Borough Organiser, Doncaster, Women's Voluntary Service.
- Irene Annie Shand Ellis Shortland, Honorary Collector, Sleaford No. 3 Street Savings Group, Lincolnshire.
- Ernest Edward Shuttleworth, Tinsmith, Altrincham Service Centre, Manchester Group, North Western Gas Board. (Altrincham.)
- Frederick James Sibley, Third Class Examiner, Royal Ordnance Factory, Glascoed. (Monmouth.)
- Charles Simons, Foreman, Distribution Department, Worksop District, East Midlands Gas Board. (Worksop.)
- Grace Lawrie Slater. For charitable services in Hexham, Northumberland.
- Thomas Smith, Foreman, Lady Haig's Poppy Factory, Edinburgh.
- Thomas Edward Smith, Chief Cook, SS Ormsary, J. & J. Denholm (Management) Ltd. (Sunderland.)
- Reginald Stanley Spencer, Civilian Instructor, No. 1008 (Wotton-under-Edge) Squadron, Air Training Corps. (Wotton-under-Edge, Gloucestershire.)
- Wilfred Spencer, Chargehand Caulker, Vickers-Armstrongs (Shipbuilders) Ltd., Barrow-in-Furness.
- Albert John Stack, Apprentice Supervisor, Associated Electrical Industries (Woolwich) Ltd. (London, SE9.)
- Kathleen M. Stanbridge, Collector, Street Savings Group, Belfast.
- Benjamin Digory Stevens, Permanent Chargeman of Engine Fitters, Admiralty. (Torpoint, Cornwall.)
- Ninian Stewart, Stores Controller, Fairfield Shipbuilding and Engineering Company Ltd., Glasgow.
- Charles Albert Henry Stokes, MM, District Fitting Foreman, South Eastern Gas Board. (St. Mary Cray, Kent.)
- Leslie Charles Cyril Studd, Draughtsman, Higher Grade, Cabinet Office. (Goring-by-Sea, Sussex.)
- William Henry Sumner, Foreman Carpenter, J. Laing & Co., Ltd., Coventry Cathedral. (Coventry.)
- John Edward Symon, Assistant Inspector, London Postal Region, General Post Office. (Leigh-on-Sea, Essex.)
- Mary Taylor, Centre Organiser, Louth Rural District, Women's Voluntary Service.
- Henry William Tonks, Boatswain, SS Empress of England, Canadian Pacific Steamships Ltd. (Liverpool.)
- Alfred George Trim, Unit Contract Tailor, Royal Marine Barracks, Portsmouth. (Cowplain, Hampshire.)
- Leslie Trout, Supervisor, Solartron Electronic Group Ltd. (Kingston-upon-Thames, Surrey.)
- Margaret Laurie Turner, Member in charge of Salvage, Glasgow Centre, Women's Voluntary Service. (Glasgow.)
- Minnie Turner, Honorary Collector, Street Savings Group, Reading, Berkshire.
- Charles Vincent, County Sergeant Major, St. John Ambulance Brigade, Bristol.
- Ivor Glyn Walters, Inspector (Postal), General Post Office, Haverfordwest, Pembrokeshire.
- William Harry Webb, Station Warden, Royal Air Force, Benson. (Wallingford, Berkshire.)
- Nathan William Whiston, Relief Inspector (London Midland Region), British Railways. (Stoke-on-Trent.)
- Albert Edward Whomsley, JP, Signalman (Eastern Region), British Railways. (Newark.)
- Esther Wilkinson, Sampler-Tester, Milk Service, Ministry of Agriculture, Fisheries and Food. (Middlesbrough.)
- Richard. Albert David Williams, Coppersmith, Capenhurst Works, United Kingdom Atomic Energy Authority. (Birkenhead.)
- William Edward Williams, Civilian Warrant Officer, No. 1010 (Salisbury) Squadron, Air Training Corps. (Salisbury.)
- Jack Withnall, lately Mains Foreman, Wolverhampton District, Midlands Electricity Board. (Wolverhampton.)
- Ethel Wynn Worsley, Member, County Borough Staff, Salford, Women's Voluntary Service.
- William Henderson Young, City Officer, Edinburgh Corporation. (Edinburgh.)

State of New South Wales

- James Waters Smith, Chief Messenger, Department of Health, New South Wales.

State of Tasmania

- Florence Maud Mary Welch. For voluntary services to social welfare, philanthropic and patriotic organisations in Launceston.

Federation of Malaya

- William Clement, lately Police Lieutenant, Royal Federation of Malaya Police.
- Tom Stanley Dyson, lately Police Lieutenant, Royal Federation of Malaya Police.

Southern Rhodesia

- Solomon Jack Dzwittie, African Probation Officer, Social Welfare Department, Southern Rhodesia.

Northern Rhodesia

- Sale Musa, Head Messenger, Abercorn District, Northern Rhodesia.
- Emmans James Chola Njalamimba, President of flhe Urban Court, Luanshya, Northern Rhodesia.
- Bertie Lloyd Ponya, Administrative Assistant, Mporokoso District, Northern Rhodesia.

Nyasaland

- Lazarus Norman Gondwe, Agricultural Supervisor, Department of Agriculture, Nyasaland.

Overseas Territories

- Syed Abdula Mohamed, Head Messenger, Supreme Court, Aden.
- Arthur Samuel Adolphus, Inspector of Police, British Honduras.
- Bertha Muriel Griffith, Anaesthetic Sister, Belize Hospital, British Honduras.
- Stephen Frans Heusner, Superintendent, Belize Fire Brigade, British Honduras.
- Carlos Angel Orio, Signals Sergeant of Police, British Honduras.
- Veronica Suria, Temporary Staff Nurse, British Solomon Islands Protectorate.
- Wilson Vave, Carpenter, Public Works Department, British Solomon Islands Protectorate.
- Rahmat Ali, Assistant Engineer, Grade II, East Africa Common Services Organisation.
- Momodou Saho, Machine Shop Foreman, Marine Department, Gambia.
- Leung Sing, Coxswain, Government Lighthouse Tender, Hong Kong.
- Esterley Clarence Tibbetts, Superintendent of Public Works, Cayman Islands, Jamaica.
- Evelyn Nathaniel Waite, Superintendent, Curphey Home, Jamaica.
- Richard Mwangeka, Senior Chief, Kenya.
- Emanuel Attard, Collection Officer, Milk Marketing Undertaking, Malta.
- Che Muhammad bin Ya'Akub, Headmaster, Government English Primary School, Kota Belud, North Borneo.
- Arthur Frederick Bowers, Prison Warder and Constable, St Helena.
- Festo Oywak, Government Agent, Loro, Upe County, Uganda.
- Monroe Leslie Donovan, Collector of Taxes, Virgin Islands.
- Shaban Abdulla, Telephone Supervisor, Zanzibar.

=== Royal Victorian Medal (RVM) ===
In Silver

- William James Beatty.
- Chief Shipwright Artificer Douglas Alex Flux P/MX 57801.
- Charles Gibson.
- Alfred Edmund Grist.
- Yeoman Bed Goer Arthur Munns Hill, MC, DCM, Her Majesty's Bodyguard of the Yeomen of the Guard.
- Robert James Pettengell.
- Marion Mackay Polson.
- Albert William Prescott.
- Police Constable William Sparkes, Metropolitan Police.
- John William Tack.
- Cecil Francis Tayler.

=== Royal Red Cross (RRC) ===
- Barbara Frances Bailey, ARRC, Superintending Sister/Matron, Queen Alexandra's Royal Naval Nursing Service.
- Major Kathleen Mabel Cross (206825), Queen Alexandra's Royal Army Nursing Corps.

==== Associate of the Royal Red Cross (ARRC) ====
- Patricia Gould, Superintending Sister, Queen Alexandra's Royal Naval Nursing Service.
- Major Valerie Winifred Cavey (308220), Queen Alexandra's Royal Army Nursing Corps.
- Major Doreen Gray (254512), Queen Alexandra's Royal Army Nursing Corps.
- Squadron Officer Elsie Lay (405491), Princess Mary's Royal Air Force Nursing Service.
- Flight Officer Dorothy Hutchins (407607), Princess Mary's Royal Air Force Nursing Service.

=== Air Force Cross (AFC) ===
- Wing Commander Edward Michael Sparrow, DFC, (124661).
- Wing Commander Ronald Wood, DFC, (121525).
- Squadron Leader Bertrand Brownlow (203626).
- Squadron Leader Jack Morton Henderson (4042817).
- Squadron Leader John Frederick George Howe (503984).
- Squadron Leader Geoffrey Moss (181112).
- Flight Lieutenant Frank Roger Brambley (4071823).
- Flight Lieutenant Peter George Hearn (504414).
- Flight Lieutenant Peter Ernest Nelson (195206).
- Flight Lieutenant Owen George Thomas (167461).

Bar to the Air Force Cross

- Wing Commander Arthur Harper, AFC, (57079).
- Wing Commander Anthony Brien John Pearson, AFC, (41200).
- Wing Commander Raymond Benjamin Phillips, DFC, AFC, (177656).
- Squadron Leader Brian Patrick William Mercer, AFC, (3110215).
- Flight Lieutenant Daniel Clifford Evans, AFC, (203759), Royal Air Force, (Retired).

=== Queen's Commendation for Valuable Service in the Air ===
Army

- 1878306 Warrant Officer Class I Kenneth Andrew Mead, DFM, Army Air Corps.

Royal Air Force

- Acting Group Captain David Cecil Hugh Simmons, AFC.
- Wing Commander Alan Cyril Davies (151820).
- Wing Commander Rex David Roe (168233).
- Squadron Leader Peter David George Terry (203299).
- Squadron Leader Alan Twigg (3039015).
- Squadron Leader Arthur Veale (57631).
- Acting Squadron Leader Derek Renton Atkinson (3501370).
- Flight Lieutenant Anthony Malcolm Aldridge (504933).
- Flight Lieutenant Robert Dennis Alexander (1333627).
- Flight Lieutenant Raymond John Cotton (4066622).
- Flight Lieutenant Henry Mentor Dixon (1318545).
- Flight Lieutenant Francis Grimshaw (1920632).
- Flight Lieutenant James Ernest Hainsworth (1675324).
- Flight Lieutenant Jim Clifton Hemsley (1852505).
- Flight Lieutenant Douglas Alan Osment Lloyd (3110111).
- Flight Lieutenant John Alexander Matheson (55054).
- Flight Lieutenant Raymond Wynne Price (186496).
- Flight Lieutenant James Robertson Rhind (3509000).
- Flight Lieutenant Bruce Peter Rowden, BEM, (578972).
- Flight Lieutenant William Sharples (195579).
- Flight Lieutenant Michael Arthur Sproul, (62338).
- Flight Lieutenant John Stanley, AFC (500721).
- Flight Lieutenant John Thirtle (504990).
- Flight Lieutenant Michael Richard Williams (503839).
- Flying Officer Maurice John Biggs (1891302).
- Flying Officer George Rorison (3507086).
- Flying Officer Leonard Fred Smith (1622406).
- Master Pilot James Topp (1582255).
- Master Signaller Frank Burke (1138079).

United Kingdom

- Captain Ronald Edward Gillman, DFC, DFM, Senior Training Captain, British European Airways Corporation.
- John Henry Kingston, Flight Engineer Superintendent (Flight Operations), British Overseas Airways Corporation.
- Captain John Charles Stuart Wortley Neilan, Senior Test Pilot, British European Airways Corporation.

Overseas Territories

- Captain Walter James Davis, DFC, Head of Aviation Department, Brunei Shell Petroleum Company.
- Captain William Horace Easey, Senior Pilot, Bahamas Airways Ltd.

=== Queen's Police Medal (QPM) ===
England and Wales

- Bernard Nicolas Bebbington, OBE, Chief Constable, Cambridge City Police.
- James Edward Bailey, Chief Constable, Oxfordshire Constabulary.
- Ralph Davison, Chief Constable, Middlesbrough Borough Police.
- Frank Richardson, Chief Constable, Preston Borough Police.
- William Derrick Capper, Assistant Chief Constable, Birmingham City Police.
- Edward Percival Palmer, Chief Superintendent, Bedfordshire Constabulary.
- Alfred William Kettleborough, Chief Superintendent, Lincolnshire Constabulary.
- Leonard Shipton, Superintendent and Deputy Chief Constable, Derby County Borough Police.
- Arthur Charles Brown, Superintendent, Somerset Constabulary.
- James Neil Black, Superintendent, Metropolitan Police.
- Colin Basil Walton, Superintendent, Metropolitan Police.
- Beatrice May Gargrave, Woman Superintendent, Metropolitan Police.

Scotland

- George Birnie, Chief Superintendent, Glasgow City Police.
- Hector McKinnon Wilson, Superintendent, Stirling and Clackmannan Police Force.

Northern Ireland

- Robert McClement Finlay, Head Constable, Royal Ulster Constabulary.

State of New South Wales

- Edward John Barnes, Superintendent 2nd Class, New South Wales Police Force.
- John Archibald Wright, Superintendent 2nd Class, New South Wales Police Force.
- Ronald John Walden, Detective Superintendent 2nd Class, New South Wales Police Force.
- Robert Arthur Bodel, Superintendent 3rd Class, New South Wales Police Force.
- John Abraham Burke, Superintendent 3rd Class, New South Wales Police Force.
- Leslie Kingsley Coble, Inspector 1st Class, New South Wales Police Force.

State of South Australia

- William Ridland, Superintendent, South Australia Police Force.
- Kenneth George Sharpe, Superintendent, South Australia Police Force.
- Richard Lester Maddaford, Senior Inspector, South Australia Police Force.

Southern Rhodesia

- George Mervyn Harries, Senior Assistant Commissioner, British South Africa Police.

Overseas Territories

- Alan Neil Outram, Commissioner of Police, Brunei.
- Campbell Alleyne Mahon, Assistant Commissioner of Police, Jamaica.
- James Porter Reid, Assistant Commissioner of Police, Trinidad.
- George Alan Anderson, Assistant Commissioner of Police, Uganda.
- Roy Henry Victor Biles, Commissioner of Police, Zanzibar.

=== Queen's Fire Services Medal (QFSM) ===
England and Wales

- Frederick William Anderson, Divisional Officer (Deputy Chief Officer), Southend-on-Sea Fire Brigade.
- William Douglas Outram, OBE, Chief Officer, Kingston-upon-Hull Fire Brigade.
- Robert Glynne Owen, Divisional Officer (Deputy Chief Officer), Caernarvonshire Fire Brigade.
- James Edward Yapp, Divisional Officer, Birmingham Fire Brigade.

Scotland

- David Macbeth, Divisional Officer, North Eastern Fire Brigade.

Overseas Territories

- Joseph Milner, Deputy Director, Fire Services, Hong Kong Fire Brigade.

=== Colonial Police Medal (CPM) ===
Southern Rhodesia

- Andrew Meikle Braes, Superintendent, British South Africa Police.
- John Cook, Chief Inspector, British South Africa Police.
- Lawrence John Chakanyuka Denga, Detective Station Sergeant, British South Africa Police.
- Jacob Chizani Mapfungautsi, Station Sergeant, British South Africa Police.
- Tinapi Swithen Mapiye, Station Sergeant, British South Africa Police.
- Reuben Mangwiro Pawadyira, Station Sergeant, British South Africa Police.
- Charles Harry Plastow, Superintendent, British South Africa Police.
- William Sunter, Detective Chief Inspector, British South Africa Police.

Northern Rhodesia

- Frank Kenneth Buckingham, Assistant Inspector, Northern Rhodesia Police.
- John Aylmer Coates, Detective Inspector, Northern Rhodesia Police.
- James Francis Patrick Fitzgerald, Superintendent, Northern Rhodesia Police.
- Benedicto Luchembe, Head Constable, Northern Rhodesia Police.
- John Dennis Williams, Assistant Superintendent, Northern Rhodesia Police.

Nyasaland

- Denis Benjamin Moore, Assistant Commissioner, Nyasaland Police.
- Stanley Roper, Superintendent, Nyasaland Police.

Overseas Territories

- Lucien Affouye, Inspector, Mauritius Police Force.
- Ernest Bailey, BEM, Sergeant, Gibraltar Police Force.
- Thomas Arthur Bedford, Chief Inspector, Kenya Police Force.
- James William Bell, Inspector, Jamaica Police Force.
- Leo Musoke Bogere, Superintendent, Uganda Police Force.
- Frederick Cannon, Superintendent, St. Lucia Police Force, formerly Senior Superintendent, British Guiana Police Force.
- Joseph Renaud Carver, Assistant Superintendent, Mauritius Police Force.
- Chan Chu-wai, Assistant Divisional Officer, Hong Kong Fire Brigade.
- Peter James Clough, Senior Superintendent, Hong Kong Police Force.
- Cyril Augustine Collins, Chief Inspector, Kenya Police Force.
- Adam bin Dusman, Superintendent, Uganda Police Force.
- Harry Lloyd-Evans, Superintendent, Gambia Police Force.
- Thomas Joseph Foley, Senior Superintendent, Jamaica Police Force.
- David St John Forrer, Assistant Commissioner, Brunei Police Force.
- Harry Colwell Gay, Deputy Superintendent, North Borneo Police Force.
- Francisco Hernandez, Inspector, Trinidad Police Force.
- William Carruthers Horne, Deputy Superintendent, Uganda Police Force.
- Mwateni Kadzungu, Sergeant, Kenya Police Force.
- Goolam Ahmud Khoyratty, Sergeant, Mauritius Police Force.
- Lewis Andrew Hodgkinson Lack, MC, Senior Superintendent, Jamaica Police Force.
- Lai Man Yau, Staff Sergeant, Hong Kong Police Force.
- Gonzaga Lepoto, Staff Sergeant, Basutoland Mounted Police.
- Julius Liphoto, Assistant Superintendent, Basutoland Mounted Police.
- Lo Ka-hing, Inspector, Hong Kong Auxiliary Police Force.
- Lui Lok, Staff Sergeant, Hong Kong Police Force.
- Mahmood Hassan Malik, Assistant Superintendent, Uganda Police Force.
- George Manswell, Inspector, Trinidad Police Force.
- M'Utongori Masana, Sergeant, Kenya Police Force.
- Richard Sydney Hownam-Meek, Assistant Superintendent, Hong Kong Auxiliary Police Force.
- William Alexander Milne, Senior Superintendent, Kenya Police Force.
- Robert Neil Oliver, Chief Inspector, Hong Kong Police Force.
- Lourensio Oyukutu s/o Mondo, Sergeant, Uganda Police Force.
- Expedit Quirin, Inspector, Mauritius Police Force.
- Sitivini Sebana, Detective Sergeant, Uganda Police Force.
- Lameka Wanzala Sengendo, Sub-Inspector, Uganda Police Force.
- John Alexander Sherrard-Smith, Senior Superintendent, Kenya Police Force.
- Constantine Augustus Spence, Superintendent, Jamaica Police Force.
- Edward Alexander Thomas, Detective Inspector, Jamaica Police Force.
- Leonard Nylon Ts'o, Inspector, Hong Kong Auxiliary Police Force.
- Alexander Augustus Vale, Superintendent, Uganda Police Force.
- John Henry Lynch Wade, Assistant Superintendent, St Lucia Police Force.
- John Richard Walker, Deputy Superintendent, Uganda Police Force.
- John Albert White, Superintendent, Hong Kong Police Force.
- Wu Man-chiu, Assistant Divisional Officer, Hong Kong Fire Brigade.

== Australia ==
=== Knight Bachelor ===
- Adolph Basser, CBE, of Edgecliff, New South Wales. For philanthropic services.
- Henry Cecil Colville, MB, MS, President of the Australian Medical Association.
- Louis Francis Loder, CBE, formerly Director-General, Commonwealth Department of Works.
- Charles George McDonald, CBE, MB, ChM, of Woollahra, New South Wales. For services to the medical profession.
- James Plimsoll, CBE, Australian Permanent Representative to the United Nations, New York.

=== Order of the Bath ===
==== Companion of the Order of the Bath (CB) ====
Military Division

- Major-General John Gordon Noel Wilton, CBE, DSO, (216), Australian Staff Corps.

=== Order of Saint Michael and Saint George ===
==== Companion of the Order of St Michael and St George (CMG) ====
- Charles Sinclair Butt, of Malvern, Victoria. For public services.
- George Francis Davies, a prominent Company Director, of Hobart, Tasmania.

=== Order of the British Empire ===
==== Knight Commander of the Order of the British Empire (KBE) ====
Military Division

- Air Marshal Valston Eldridge Hancock, CB, CBE, DFC, Royal Australian Air Force.

Civil Division

- Frederick William George White, CBE, Chairman, Commonwealth Scientific and Industrial Research Organisation.

==== Commander of the Order of the British Empire (CBE) ====
Military Division

- Rear-Admiral Thomas Kenneth Morrison, OBE, DSC, Royal Australian Navy.
- Brigadier Charles Edward Long (369), Australian Staff Corps.
- Group Captain Reginald Henry Saville Davis, OBE, Royal Australian Air Force.

Civil Division

- John David Bates, VRD, of Rose Bay, New South Wales. For services to the community, particularly on the field of Australian tourist development.
- Leonard Battley Evans, of Kew, Victoria, For public services.
- Rupert Harry Colin Loof, Clerk of the Senate of the Commonwealth of Australia.
- Edmund Leslie Merigan, Associate Commissioner, Snowy Mountains Hydro-Electric Authority.
- John Bruce Piggott, MBE, President of the Law Council of Australia.
- James Vernon, OBE, of Double Bay, New South Wales. For services to commerce and industry in Australia.
- Frederick Henry Wheeler, OBE, Chairman, Commonwealth Public Service Board.
- Harold Leslie White, National Librarian, Commonwealth National Library.

==== Officer of the Order of the British Empire (OBE) ====
Military Division

Royal Australian Navy

- Commander Leonard Frederick Willott Vickridge, VRD, Royal Australian Naval Reserve.
- Supply Lieutenant-Commander Lyell Adolphe Bock, Royal Australian Navy.
- Lieutenant (S.D.) Frederick Henry Pitt, Royal Australian Navy.

Australian Military Forces

- Colonel Arthur Godfrey Allaway, ED, (350008), Australian Army Legal Corps.
- Colonel Maurice Austin, DSO, (110), Australian Staff Corps.
- Colonel Francis Philip Serong (3102), Australian Staff Corps.

Royal Australian Air Force

- Wing Commander Harold William Tyler (03627), Royal Australian Air Force.
- Acting Wing Commander Frederick John Boorman (022063), Royal Australian Air Force.

Civil Division

- John Back, of Artarmon, New South Wales. For services to education.
- David Dowson Bell, Deputy Crown Solicitor, Melbourne.
- Ida Jessie Boley, Matron in charge of the St Ann's Rest Home, Hobart, Tasmania.
- The Reverend Alexander Petrie Campbell, of Burwood, New South Wales. For services to the community.
- Donald Augustus Dowling, MB, BS, President of the Queensland Branch of the Australian Medical Association.
- William Joseph Dowling, of North Balwyn, Victoria. For administrative services to cricket.
- Alfred Leslie Gould, Deputy Chairman, Repatriation Commission.
- William Alan Hedding, Controller-General of Production and Chairman of the Board of Management for Production, Department of Supply.
- Joseph Martin Hewitt, Chairman of the Australian Stevedoring Industry Authority.
- Eleanor Mary Hopman, of Hawthorn, Victoria. For services to women's tennis in Australia.
- William Ernest Edward Langford, MB, BS, Principal Medical Officer, Central Office, Repatriation Department.
- Gladys Ellen Machin, MBE, JP, Councillor, City of Caulfield, Victoria.
- Stewart Owen McKenna, President of the Prince Alfred Hospital Auxiliary Council.
- John Tolson Massey, MBE, BEM, of Glen Iris, Victoria. For services in the field of migrant assimilation.
- Jack Hamilton Phillips, of Melbourne, Victoria. For social welfare services to ex-servicemen and their dependants.
- Jack Rail Robertson, MB, BS, of Deloraine, Tasmania. For medical and community services.
- Donald James Stevens, Director of the Commonwealth X-ray and Radium Laboratory.

==== Member of the Order of the British Empire (MBE) ====
Military Division

Australian Military Forces

- Major Frederick Vernon Baines (337639), Australian Staff Corps.
- Major Leo Thomas James Fitzpatrick (237563), Australian Staff Corps.
- Major Sydney George Harmer (2249), Royal Australian Army Ordnance Corps.
- 2115949 Warrant Officer Class II Vincent Edward Nash, MM, Royal Australian Engineers.
- Major Leslie Trevor Olsson (414487), Royal Australian Artillery.
- 2921 Warrant Officer Class I Joseph Bede Patrick O' Sullivan, Royal Australian Infantry Corps.
- 5418 Warrant Officer Class I Arthur Hope Simpson, Royal Australian Survey Corps.

Royal Australian Air Force

- Acting Flight Lieutenant Victor Bradley Sharp (042016), Air Training Corps Reserve.
- Warrant Officer Raymond William Hinde (A3878), Royal Australian Air Force.
- Warrant Officer Laurence Cyril Albert Mostran (A31189), Royal Australian Air Force.

Civil Division

- Leith Charleston, President of the Women's Auxiliary, Grafton Base Hospital, New South Wales.
- Ethel May Clements, of Kensington, New South Wales. For services to the South African War Veterans' Association for over 30 years.
- Mary Roberta Powell Cordner, of East Kew, Victoria. For political and public services.
- Margaret Christina Dawe, of Finley, New South Wales. For charitable services.
- Freda Mary Dean, Vice-President, Newcastle Branch, Australian-American Association.
- Agnes Ann East, of Alice Springs, Northern Territory. For social welfare services.
- Violet Elsie Graf, President of the Orange, New South Wales Branch of the Red Cross Society.
- Douglas Gordon Graham, of Penshurst, New South Wales. For social welfare services.
- Teresa Graham, Secretary of the Ballan, Victoria Branch of the Red Cross Society.
- John Allan Ledward, of Brighton Beach, Victoria. For services to cricket.
- John Raymond Lockington, Chief Aeronautical Inspector, Melbourne Area, Department of Air.
- Harold Macdonald, Personal Assistant to successive Australian High Commissioners in London.
- Kenneth Alexander Mathieson, of Hamilton, New South Wales. For services to the community.
- Frances Myrtle O'Rorke, formerly Sister-in-Charge, Civic Baby Health Centre and Occasional Care Centre in Canberra.
- Mabel Winifred Perry, of St. Arnaud, Victoria. For social welfare services.
- Adelaide May Pope, of Bowral, New South Wales. For charitable services.
- Louisa Letitia Porter, of Parkes, New South Wales. For services to the Red Cross Society.
- Captain Eric Ramsay Robinson, Flight Superintendent, Training, Qantas Empire Airways.
- Stanley Greig Smith, JP, of Camberwell, Victoria. For services to social welfare and charitable associations.
- Clara Montgreenan Stevenson, of Narrabeen, New South Wales. For social welfare services.
- Ernest Alfred Tambling, of Darwin, Northern Territory. For services to education.
- Arthur Ernest Walker, Representative of the Young Men's Christian Association at Puckapunyal Military Camp, Victoria.

=== British Empire Medal (BEM) ===
Military Division

Royal Australian Navy

- Acting Petty Officer Edward Wilfred Linton, O.N.R.47373, Royal Australian Navy.
- Able Seaman Norman Henry Jeffress, O.N.R.49404, Royal Australian Navy.

Australian Military Forces

- 24219 Staff-Sergeant Francis John Beadle, Royal Australian Infantry Corps.
- 311251 Lance-Corporal John Henry Coleman, Royal Australian Infantry Corps.
- 129070 Warrant Officer Class I (temporary) Keith Norman Hebden, Royal Australian Infantry Corps.
- 22863 Corporal Joseph Maine, Royal Australian Engineer Corps.
- 8127 Sergeant (temporary) Osi-Ivaraoa, Royal Australian Infantry Corps.
- 2138909 Warrant Officer Class II (temporary) Arthur Leslie Puckeridge, Australian Army Catering Corps.
- 28142 Sergeant Royston Clive Wilkinson, Royal Australian Army Provost Corps.

Royal Australian Air Force

- A.1325 Flight Sergeant Harry Joseph Jones, Royal Australian Air Force.
- A.51703 Leading Aircraftman Brian Eves, Royal Australian Air Force.
- A.54722 Leading Aircraftman John Harold Maddocks, Royal Australian Air Force.

Civil Division

- Sheilah Catherine Cameron, Supervisor, Typists, Grade 1, Department of Civil Aviation.
- Charles Beresford Hawkins, Foreman, Foundry, Garden Island Dockyard, Department of the Navy.
- Percival Charles Mc Hutchison, General Secretary, Non-Official Postmasters' Association of Australia.
- John Francis Montgomery, Stationer, Division of Finance and Stores, Department of Civil Aviation.
- William Clement Sawyer, Senior Foreman, Naval Stores, Garden Island, Department of the Navy.

=== Air Force Cross (AFC) ===
- Wing Commander William Rex Berriman (021981), Royal Australian Air Force.
- Squadron Leader Mervyn Joseph Tate (033125), Royal Australian Air Force.
- Flight Lieutenant Thomas Hugh Thorpe (014501), Royal Australian Air Force.
- Flying Officer Owen Robert Fox Bartrop (041823), Royal Australian Air Force.

Bar to Air Force Cross

- Wing Commander John Wilkins Hubble, DSO, AFC, (053833), Royal Australian Air Force.

=== Queen's Commendation for Valuable Service in the Air ===
Royal Australian Air Force

- Flight Lieutenant Martie Tarrant Burke (034493), Royal Australian Air Force.
- Flight Lieutenant Francis John Quinn (02364), Royal Australian Air Force.
- Flight Lieutenant Donald Couldery White (013864), Royal Australian Air Force.

Royal Australian Army Light Aircraft Squadron

- Lieutenant Brian William Oxley (3/35110).

== Nigeria ==
=== Order of Saint Michael and Saint George ===
==== Companion of the Order of St Michael and St George (CMG) ====
Federation of Nigeria

- Reginald Arnold Clarke, OBE, DFC, Permanent Secretary, Ministry of Finance.

Northern Region

- Mallem Adamu Jimba, CBE, Emir of Bauchi.

Eastern Region

- Dennis Raleigh Gibbs, DSO, Permanent Secretary.

=== Order of the British Empire ===
==== Commander of the Order of the British Empire (CBE) ====
Civil Division

Federation of Nigeria

- Martin Beauchamp Hall, formerly Permanent Secretary of a number of Federal Ministries.
- Archibald Mungo Muir, formerly Permanent Secretary, Ministry of Communications.

Northern Region

- Edward Hugh Michael Counsell, Administrative Officer, Class I.

==== Officer of the Order of the British Empire (OBE) ====
Civil Division

Federation of Nigeria

- James Royden Clackson, formerly Director, British West African Meteorological Services.

Northern Region

- Barry Atkinson Abbott, Administrative Officer, Class I.
- Alhaji Abdurrahman Okene, Administrative Officer, Class I.
- Mallam Nagayi Shuaibu Naibi, Inspector of Education (Supernumerary).
- Daniel John Percy Parker, MB, FRCS(Ed.), Senior Specialist (Surgeon).

Eastern Region

- The Right Reverend Anthony Gogo Nwedo, Roman Catholic Bishop of Umuahia.
- David Okagbue, Surveyor-General.

Western Region

- William Hardy, Regional Director of the United Africa Company Ltd., Ibadan.
- Thomas Adeoye Lambo, MD, Psychiatric Specialist.

==== Member of the Order of the British Empire (MBE) ====
Military Division

- Captain Thomas James Lee (323062), Corps of Royal Military Police, on loan to the Government of the Federation of Nigeria.

Civil Division

Federation of Nigeria

- Tairu Adamu. For services to the Nigerian Railway, especially in connection with the Bornu Extension project.
- Alexander Adeyokun Fajemisin, Film Director, Federal Film Unit.
- Walter George Haggar, Chief Pilot, Nigeria Airways.
- William Alfred Hobbs, Assistant Director of Prisons.
- Anne Maureen Tugwell, Personal Secretary, Grade I, Ministry of Finance.

Northern Region

- Joseph Edward Baxter Dawson, formerly Inspector of Education (Handicrafts).
- Alhaji Sani Dingyadi, Makama of Sokoto.
- Mallama Ladi Kwali, Pottery Instructor, Ministry of Trade and Industry.
- Alhaji Muhammadu, Magajin Gari of Kazaure Native Authority.
- Cyril Peel, Chief Health Superintendent.
- Arthur Abner Purdue, Organising Secretary, Northern Nigeria Sports Commission.
- Mallam Walter Hosaini Bala Zakari, Principal Establishment Officer.

Eastern Region

- Chief Silas Ezenwa, Member of the House of Chiefs.
- Elizabeth Bain Green, formerly Principal, Presbyterian Teacher Training College, Arochuku.
- Chief Neil Ubi Ofem, of the Abakaliki Province.
- Peter Chukwuma Peters, of Enugu. For public services.
- Miriam Blanche Williams, Education Officer, Women's Training College, Enugu.

Western Region

- The Reverend Canon Emmanuel Oladipo Alayande, Principal, Ibadan Grammar School.
- Alhaji Chief Sheikh Amodu Tijani Awelenje, Seriki of Muslims for Western Nigeria, and Life President-General of the United Muslim Council of Nigeria.
- The Reverend Eric Douglas Colbatch Clark, Principal, Rural Training Centre, Asaba.
- Deborah Opeyemi, Lady Jibowu, Permanent Member, Western Nigeria Local Government Service Board.
- Chief James Tarsis Ogbolu, President, Asaba Customary Court.
- Samuel Julius Fasunwon Ogunje, President, Benin Co-operative Produce Marketing Union, Benin City.

=== Companion of the Imperial Service Order (ISO) ===
Nigerian Civil Service

Northern Region

- Eustace John Harold Bowler, formerly Education Officer, Education Department, and Manager of the Jos Hill Station.

=== British Empire Medal (BEM) ===
Military Division

- Staff-Sergeant Lazarus Anyanwu, Royal Nigerian Army.
- 22542596 Staff-Sergeant Bernard Dossetter, Royal Corps of Signals, on loan to the Government of the Federation of Nigeria.

Civil Division, for Gallantry

- Lance Corporal Emmanuel Soje, Kabba Provincial Native Authority Police. For arresting a lunatic armed with a gun and a cutlass.

Civil Division, for Meritorious Service

Federation of Nigeria

- Ewofolbe Akadiene, Head Messenger, Federal Ministry of Health, Lagos.
- Patrick Dioka, Assistant Executive Officer, Ordnance Depot.
- Sambo Langtang, Sergeant Major, Nigeria Police Force.
- Hudson Momodu, Chief Clerk, Ordnance Depot.

Northern Region

- Mallam Hassan Dogo, DCM, Village Head of Jimeta, Adamawa Province,
- Kachalla Bukar Kolo, Ward Head, Bornu.

=== Queen's Police Medal (QPM) ===
- Courtenay Giles Bartholomew Gidley, Deputy Commissioner, Nigeria Police Force.
- William Ford, Assistant Commissioner, Nigeria Police Force.

== Sierra Leone ==
=== Order of the British Empire ===
==== Commander of the Order of the British Empire (CBE) ====
Civil Division

- Martin Fountain Page, Secretary to the Prime Minister.
- The Reverend Sylvester Milton Renner, OBE, Superintendent of the Evangelical United Brethren Conference, and Chairman of the United Christian Council.

==== Officer of the Order of the British Empire (OBE) ====
Civil Division

- Geoffrey Richard Brightin Blake, MBE, Provincial Secretary, Northern Province.
- Alderman Abdul Fattah Rahman, Mayor of Freetown.

==== Member of the Order of the British Empire (MBE) ====
Civil Division

- Muriel Blanche Dean, Lecturer in Teaching Methods, Union College, Bunumbu.
- Samuel Albert Dridged Peters, Assistant Secretary to the Public Service Commission.
- Harold Donovan Tindall, Horticulturist, Department of Agriculture, Ministry of Natural Resources.
- Prince John Valentine Williams, Chairman, Bo Town Council.
- Rachel Kezia Williams, Ward Sister, Ministry of Health.

=== Companion of the Imperial Service Order (ISO) ===
Companions of the Order

- Frederick Alpheus Levi John, Chief Dispenser, Ministry of Health.
- Samuel Victor Wright. Clerk of the House of Representatives.

=== British Empire Medal (BEM) ===
Civil Division

- Cassandra Lilian Blaize, lately Supervisor, Village Maternity Assistants, Medical Department.
- Joseph Macarthy, Senior Press Technician, Printing Department.
- Baba Saracouli, Chief Security Officer, The Diamond Corporation.

== Federation of Rhodesia and Nyasaland ==
=== Knight Bachelor ===
- The Honourable Vincent Ernest Quenet, Judge of the Federal Supreme Court.
- His Excellency Mr Albert Edward Phineas Robinson, High Commissioner for the Federation of Rhodesia and Nyasaland in London.

=== Order of Saint Michael and Saint George ===
==== Companion of the Order of St Michael and St George (CMG) ====
- Winston Joseph Field, MBE. For public and political services.

=== Order of the British Empire ===
==== Commander of the Order of the British Empire (CBE) ====
Civil Division

- Maurice Beaumont Benoy, Secretary for Defence.

==== Officer of the Order of the British Empire (OBE) ====
Military Division

- Lieutenant-Colonel Benjamin George Franklin, lately Officer Commanding, 1st Battalion, The Royal Rhodesia Regiment.
- Wing Commander Douglas Macmillan Whyte, Royal Rhodesian Air Force.

Civil Division

- Colonel Maurice Clinton Hilton Barber, DFC, Director of Civil Aviation.
- Denis Alfred Parker Butt. For services to tourism in the Federation.

==== Member of the Order of the British Empire (MBE) ====
Military Division

- Squadron Leader Frank John Edmund Gericke, Royal Rhodesian Air Force.
- Warrant Officer Class I James Stewart, Royal Rhodesian Air Force.

Civil Division

- Kingsley Dinga Dube, Second Secretary (Information), Federal High Commission, Lagos.
- Helen Janet Duff, formerly a physio-therapist in the Federal Nursing Service.
- Madeline Ann Heald, of Bulawayo. For services to the Red Cross.
- John Gordon Hofwood. For services to the Rhodesia Railways, and in social service.
- Charles Jameson Matinga. For public and political services.

=== British Empire Medal (BEM) ===
Military Division

- Warrant Officer Class II Matambo, Rhodesia and Nyasaland Army.
- Warrant Officer Class II John Zulu, Rhodesia and Nyasaland Army.
