= Auguste Hohenschild =

German alto

Auguste Hohenschild (Sidonie Marie Auguste Caroline Hohenschild; 29 September 1851 – 15 July 1938) was a German alto and singing teacher. She was trained by Amalie Joachim and performed together with Marie Fillunger, among others. From 1893 to 1922, she was married to Andreas Heusler, a German scholar, and lived in Berlin for several years.

== Life ==
Hohenschild was the daughter of the Darmstadt physician Ludwig Ernst Wilhelm Hohenschild (1829–1862) and his wife Auguste Hohenschild née Fröhlich. She was probably born in Darmstadt and had a younger sister. From January to October 1870, she studied piano at the Königliche Hochschule für Musik and singing from 1872 to 1873, among others as a pupil of Amalie Joachim. She was then an assistant teacher for singing at this institution from 1874 to 1877. She was also "active for a few years as a teacher at the University of Music and Theatre Leipzig." According to an announcement in the Allgemeine deutsche Musikzeitung, Hohenschild taught at the Hochschule Berlin until April 1878. She therefore gave up teaching to devote herself to her work as a concert singer.

In the Berliner Adressbuch, Auguste Hohenschild's mother, born Fröhlich, is registered from 1872 – it can be assumed that Hohenschild lived with her mother in Berlin from the 1870s onwards because of her studies. Hohenschild first appears independently in the Berlin address book as a concert singer and singing teacher from 1885. In 1881, she lived together with her mother in Frankfurt for a short time, probably because of her concert activities

In January 1893, Hohenschild married Andreas Heusler. They lived together at Schöneberger Ufer 41. During their marriage, regular music evenings were given in the shared flat. Heusler himself was very interested in music, played the violin and was in contact with Joseph Joachim. The couple separated in 1901 and divorced in 1922. In 1901, Hohenschild lived for a few months with her mother and sister in Schönberg. She is first mentioned in 1904 as Auguste Heusler in the Berliner Adressbuch and in 1906 as Singing teacher Auguste Heusler-Hohenschild. There are no more entries in the Berliner Adressbuch from 1909.

Hohenschild died on 15 July 1938 in Darmstadt at the age of 86.

== Concert activity ==
Hohenschild gave concerts mainly from the 1870s until her marriage in 1892. Joint concerts with Marie Fillunger are documented: for example on 29 January 1875 in Hamburg in the 2nd subscription concert of the Voigt'schen Cäcilienverein as well as on 4 and 5 March 1888 in the concert of the Essener Musikverein on its 50th anniversary. Reconstructions via the Allgemeine Deutsche Musikzeitung refer to concert performances in Hamburg, Berlin, Potsdam, Darmstadt, Frankfurt, Kassel, Basel, Cologne, Aachen and Bremen between 1875 and 1878. She sang in Mozart's Requiem and songs and arias by Schubert, Schumann, Brahms, Beethoven, Cherubini, Hiller, Spohr, in oratorios like Jephtha by Handel and Paulus by Mendelssohn Bartholdy. In 1878, she performed in Bremen with Marie Fillunger, Amalie Joachim, beside Pablo de Sarasate and Joseph Joachim, who also appeared at the concerts.

Hohenschild is mentioned in 1886, 1889, 1890 and 1891 in the Neue Zeitschrift für Musik listed as singer (alto) in the advertisements of the Hermann Wolff concert agency, in the magazine Signale für die musikalische Welt in 1888.

According to a concert review of the Allgemeine musikalische Zeitung, she performed in Stuttgart in 1881 where she sang the aria "Hellstrahlender Tag" from Odysseus by Max Bruch, as well as "Mainacht" by Brahms, "Sympathie" by Joseph Haydn and "Im Volkston" by Hans Schmidt.

In an article published in 1894 about the Königliche Hochschule für Musik Berlin in the Mitteilungen des Vereins für die Geschichte Berlins, Hohenschild is mentioned in a list of the successful and well-known students of the Hochschule.

== Research needs ==
Available concert reviews in music journals of the 19th century would make it possible to identify further stages of her artistic work and thus to reconstruct approximately the time and place of her concert activities as well as her repertoire.
