= Two Songs for Voice, Viola and Piano =

Composition by Johannes Brahms

- by Johannes Brahms
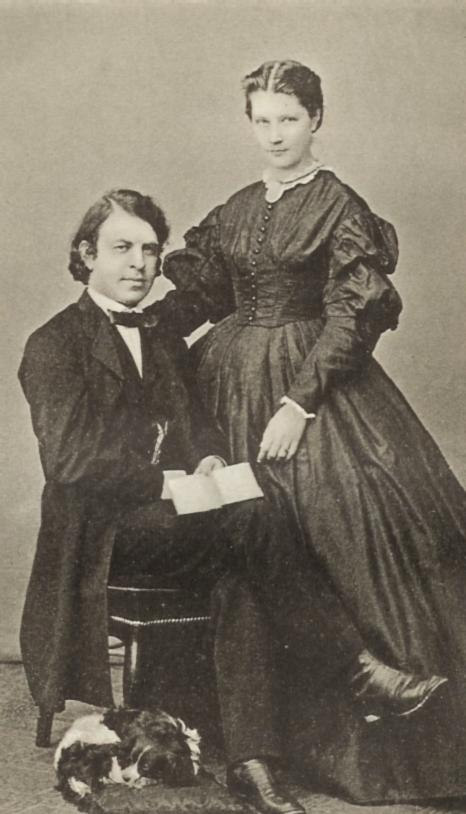
- Joseph Joachim and his wife Amalie, to whom the songs were dedicated
- Opus: 91
- Text: 1: poem by Friedrich Rückert; 2: poem by Emanuel Geibel after Lope de Vega
- Language: German
- Performed: 30 January 1885: Krefeld
- Movements: Gestillte Sehnsucht; Geistliches Wiegenlied

Two Songs for Voice, Viola and Piano (German: Zwei Gesänge für eine Altstimme mit Bratsche und Klavier), Op. 91, were composed by Johannes Brahms for his friends Joseph Joachim and his wife Amalie. The text of the first song, "Gestillte Sehnsucht" (Longing at rest), is a poem by Friedrich Rückert, composed in 1884. The text of the second, "Geistliches Wiegenlied" (Sacred lullaby) was written by Emanuel Geibel after Lope de Vega, and set to music in 1863. They were published together in 1884.

== Composition history ==
The celebrated violinist Joachim, who also played viola, married Amalie Schneeweiss in 1863. She appeared as a contralto singer under the stage name Amalie Weiss. Both were friends of Brahms, who composed the song "Geistliches Wiegenlied" for the occasion of their wedding; he withdrew it but sent it again a year later for the baptism of their son, named Johannes after Brahms. Probably in 1884, Brahms revised the song and added the setting of Rückert's poem, beginning "In goldnen Abendschein getauchet". It was again intended for the couple, but this time to help their troubled marriage.

Brahms announced to his publisher Simrock in a letter from August 1884 that he would send einige Kleinigkeiten für Gesang (a few small pieces to be sung) to be published, Opp. 91–95. The first public performance was on 30 January 1885 in a Kammermusiksoirée (evening of chamber music) in Krefeld on the occasion of the Stiftungsfeier (foundation celebration) of the Singverein. The singer was contralto Auguste Hohenschild, the violist Alwin von Beckerath, and the composer played the piano.

== Gestillte Sehnsucht ==
The first song, composed much later than the second, is a setting of three stanzas from Rückert's poem of the same name in four stanzas, published first in 1816 in Jugendlieder (Youth Songs) in the second volume of his works.

The poem begins In gold'nen Abendschein getauchet, wie feierlich die Wälder stehn! ("Immersed in golden evening glow, how solemnly the woods stand!") Each stanza is in six lines, with the rhyme scheme ABABCC. The first stanza is a description of a peaceful evening, asking what the winds and the birds whisper, and giving the answer: they whisper the world into slumber. The second stanza mentions wishes and longing, and asks the wind and the birds to make them slumber as well. The third stanza, omitted by Brahms, alludes in more images from nature to the longing. In the final stanza, the speaker admits that it is his (or her) personal longing (mein Geist, my spirit) which will end only when life ends: Dann lispeln die Winde, die Vögelein mit meinem Sehnen mein Leben ein. ("Then the winds, the birds will whisper to an end, with my longing, my life.")

Rückert's poem about nature and yearning was appealing to Brahms, who returned to Baroque practices for the setting, not only the obbligato instrument, but also a da capo form, with a contrasting middle section. It illustrates the restless desires (sonder Rast und Ruh, "without rest or silence") in an excited minor section. The third stanza is a recapitulation of the first.

== Geistliches Wiegenlied ==
The second song, composed first, is a cradle song or lullaby, setting a poem "Die ihr schwebet" ("Ye who float") which Emanuel Geibel paraphrased after a song by Lope de Vega from his Cantarcillo de la Virgen. Geibel's poem appeared first, without a title, in his Spanisches Liederbuch (Spanish song book) in the first section Geistliche Lieder (Sacred songs) as number 4.

The poem begins with a woman addressing the holy angels hovering around palms in night and wind, to silence the trees because her child is sleeping. It becomes evident that the speaker is Mary, the mother of Jesus. The first stanza has six lines, while three following stanzas have eight lines each. The second stanza describes the angry wind and palms, the third the burden of the suffering of the world, tiring the child, and the fourth threatening cold, but all four are resolved in the same last line, Es schlummert mein Kind. ("There slumbers my child.")

The viola begins the setting alone with the tune of the medieval Christmas carol "Joseph, lieber Joseph mein", a song in which Mary asks Joseph to help her to rock her baby. In the music, Brahms added the text to the tune, thus mentioning Joachim's given name. The voice enters with a different melody. The middle stanzas are set in a different metre and in minor, portraying restlessness and pain. In the end, the viola returns to the carol tune.
