= Adrian Rappoldi =

German violinist

Adrian Hans Eduard Rappoldi (13 September 1876 – 12 October 1948) was a German violinist, son of Eduard and Laura Rappoldi.

Born in Berlin, he studied at the Dresden Conservatory with Leopold Auer (violin) and Felix Draeseke (composition), then in Berlin with Joseph Joachim and August Wilhelmj. From a young age, he performed with his mother. He was first violinist in the Benjamin Bilse orchestra, and then worked as a concert master in the Bilsesche Kapelle, later in Teplitz, Chemnitz and Helsinki, and from 1909 succeeded Henri Petri at the Dresden Conservatory. In 1910, he returned to Dresden, where he taught at the local Conservatory.

Rappoldi published two small collections of études (consisting partly of transcriptions, partly of his own works of didactic plan). He translated into German "The School of Violin Playing" by Mathieu Crikboma (1929).

In 1910, Rappoldi acquired a 1719 violin by Antonio Stradivari (1719), which is now known as the "Rappoldi" Stradivari.

Rappoldi died in Bamberg at the age of 72.
