= Tappert =

Tappert is a surname. Notable people with the surname include:

- Fred Tappert (1940–2002), American physicist
- Georg Tappert (1880–1957), German expressionist painter
- Horst Tappert (1923–2008), German movie and television actor
- Wilhelm Tappert (1830–1907), German composer and music writer
