= Bernhard Listemann =

German-born violinist and conductor (1841–1917)

Bernhard Listemann (August 28, 1841 – February 11, 1917) was a German-born American violinist, conductor, and music educator.

== Life and career ==
Bernhard Listemann was born in Schlotheim, Germany on August 28, 1841. His early music studies were in Sondershausen where he was a violin student of Karl Wilhelm Uhlrich who was then concertmaster of that city's orchestra. He pursued further studies with Ferdinand David in Leipzig, Joseph Joachim in Hannover, and Henry Vieuxtemps in Brussels. He was appointed to the first violin section of the Leipzig Gewandhaus Orchestra when he was 15 years old. During his time in this ensemble he played in concerts conducted by Hans von Bülow and Franz Liszt. From 1859 to 1867 he served as a court musician in Rudolstadt; holding the post of Kammervirtuose as appointed by Friedrich Günther, Prince of Schwarzburg-Rudolstadt.

In October 1867 Listemann immigrated to the United States with his brother, the violinist Fritz Listemann (1839-1909). He made his American concert debut at Steinway Hall in New York City the following month. He became a prominent musical figure in Boston where he made his concert debut performing Joachim’s Violin Concerto No. 2 with the Harvard Musical Association in 1868. He served the next two years as concertmaster of that organization. From 1871-1874 he was concertmaster of Theodore Thomas's orchestra in New York City.

After this Listemann returned to Boston where he was active as a concert violinist, chamber musician, and conductor. He founded the Boston Philharmonic Club and Orchestra; an organization he established in 1879 after being frustrated with the Harvard Musical Association's opposition to performing the music of Liszt and Richard Wagner. Led until 1881? As a chamber musician he performed as a member of the Mendelssohn Quintette Club, and he was concertmaster of the Boston Symphony Orchestra from 1881-1885.; He also either played in and/or conducted several ensembles he established during the 1880s and 1890s; included the Listemann Club, the Listemann String Quartet, and the Bernard Listemann Company.

In 1894 Listemann moved to Chicago where he taught on the faculty of the Chicago Musical College. He was the authored of the book Modem Method of Violin Playing (1869). He two sons which were both musicians, Fritz Listemann and Franz Listemann. His daughter Virginia Listemann was a coloratura soprano.

Listemann died of heart disease in Chicago, Illinois on February 11, 1917.
