= Violin Concerto in D minor =

Violin Concerto in D minor may refer to:

- Concerto for Violin and Strings (Mendelssohn)
- Violin Concerto No. 4 (Paganini)
- Violin Concerto (Schumann)
- Violin Concerto No. 2 (Wieniawski)
- Violin Concerto No. 2 (Joachim)
- Violin Concerto No. 2 (Bruch)
- Violin Concerto No. 3 (Bruch)
- Violin Concerto (Fauré)
- Violin Concerto (Strauss)
- Violin Concerto (Sibelius)
- Violin Concerto (Khachaturian)
