= Johannes Palaschko =

German musician

- Born: July 13, 1877; Berlin
- Died: October 21, 1932 (aged 55); Berlin
- Education: Berlin Hochschule für Musik
- Spouse: Martha Jürgens

Johannes Palaschko (13 July 1877 in Berlin – 21 October 1932 in Berlin) was a German composer, violinist and violist who wrote numerous works for both violin and viola. He became a violin student of Joseph Joachim in 1891, concurrently studying music theory with Ernst Eduard Taubert and composition with Heinrich von Herzogenberg. In 1899 he graduated from the Berlin Hochschule für Musik. In 1913 he became Director of the Böttscher Conservatory in Berlin; that same year he married Martha Jürgens.

Many of his viola etudes are still in print; he published 480 violin etudes and 217 viola etudes. He also published 178 works for violin and piano.

== Works ==
A listing by opus number is found in the German version of this article.

Keyboard

- Op. 29: Postludium. C moll [Postludium. C Minor]. Organ. Leipzig: C. F. Kahnt, ca. 1901.
- Op. 60: Ballet Music. Piano. Philadelphia: T. Presser, 1923.
- Op. 67: Rondoletto. Piano. London: Alfred Lengnick & Co., 1924.

Viola Etudes

- Op. 36: 20 Etüden für Viola zur Förderung der Technik und des Vortrags [20 Etudes for Viola for Developing Technic and Artistry]. Viola. Leipzig: Kistner, 1905.
- Op. 44: 10 Künstler Etüden [10 Artist Studies]. Viola. Leipzig: Zimmermann, 1907.
- Op. 49: 10 Viola-Studien für vorgerückte Spieler [10 Studies for Advanced Violists]. Viola. Heilbronn: Schmidt, 1910.
- Op. 55: 12 Studien [12 Studies]. Viola. Leipzig: Steingräber, 1912.
- Op. 62: 12 Studi [12 Studies]. Viola. Milan: Ricordi, 1923, ripristino 1956.
- Op. 66: 15 Studien [15 Studies]. Viola. Mainz: Schott, 1926.
- Op. 70: 15 Studi [15 Studies]. Viola. Milan: Ricordi, 1926.
- Op. 77: 24 Études Mélodiques [24 Melodic Studies]. Viola. Paris: Leduc, 1927.
- Op. 86: 24 leichte melodische Viola-Studien [24 Easy Melodic Viola Studies]. Viola. Mainz/Leipzig: Schott, 1930. 1-16 are in 1st position, 17-24 are in 1st and 3rd position.
- Op. 87: 25 studi facili e melodici [25 Easy Melodic Studies]. Viola (1st and 3rd Position). Milan: Ricordi, 1928.
- Op. 92: Melodische Etüden [Melodic Studies]. Viola and (Optional) Piano. Berlin: Simrock, 1929. Published in 2 volumes: Vol. 1: 1-12, Vol. 2: 13-25. These works are much more complete with the piano part.
- Op. 96: 25 Melodische Studien [25 Melodic Studies]. Viola. Leipzig: Merseburger, 1930.

Viola and Piano

- Op. 92: Melodische Etüden [Melodic Studies]. Viola and (Optional) Piano. Berlin: Simrock, 1929. Published in 2 volumes: Vol. 1: 1-12, Vol. 2: 13-25. These works are much more complete with the piano part.

Violin Etudes and Solo Pieces

- Op. 14: 6 Concert-Etüden. 6 mehrstimmige Studien [6 Concert Etudes. 6 Doublestop Studies]. Violin. Leipzig: Rahter, 1900.
- Op. 23: Suite (4 movements). Violin. Berlin: Bote & Bock, 1899.
- Op. 43: 15 Etüden [15 Etudes]. Violin (1st Position). Leipzig: Kistner, 1907.
- Op. 45: 14 leicht-Übungsstücke [14 Easy Study Pieces]. Violin (1st Position). Leipzig: Zimmermann, 1908.
- Op. 46: 16 Übungsstücke für Violine mit Benutzung der 1. und 3. Position (Fortsetzung zu Op. 45) [16 Study Pieces for Violin with the Use of 1st and 3rd Position (Continuation of Op. 45)]. Leipzig: Zimmermann, 1908.
- Op. 48: 10 Studien für Violine in der II., IV. und VI. Position [10 Studies for Violin in 2nd, 4th and 6th Position]. Violin. Berlin: Ries & Erler, 1909.
- Op. 51: 18 Elementar-Studien [18 Elementary Studies]. Violin (1st Position). Leipzig: Steingräber, 1911.
- Op. 58: 26 Studien [26 Studies]. Violin. Leipzig: Steingräber, 1919.
- Op. 71: 18 Studi di Posizione [18 Position Studies]. Violin (1st to 6th Position). Milan: Ricordi, 1926.
- Op. 73: 20 studi facili [20 Easy Studies]. Violin (1st Position). Milan: Ricordi, 1926.
- Op. 75: 25 Études mélodiques; sur la 4e corde [25 Melodic Etudes on the G String]. Violin. Paris: Leduc, 1928.
- Op. 76: 50 Melodische Violin-Etüden für die Elementar- und Mittelstufe [50 Melodic Violin Etudes for Elementary and Intermediate Level]. Violin. Mainz: Schott 1421-1423, 1928. In 3 volumes: Vol. 1: 1-18 in 1st Position, Vol. 2: 19-34 in 1st and 3rd Position, Vol. 3: 35-50 in 1st, 3rd and 5th Position.
- Op. 78: 25 Études Mélodiques sur la 4e corde [25 Melodic Etudes on the G String]. Violin. Paris: Leduc, 1928.
- Op. 82: 24 studi melodici per violino sulla corda di sol [24 Melodic Studies for Violin on the G String]. Milan: Ricordi, 1928.
- Op. 84: 24 leichte melodische Etuden für Violine in allen Dur- und Molltonarten [24 Easy Melodic Studies in All Major and Minor Keys]. Violin (1st Position). London: Schott, 1928. Published in 2 volumes.
- Op. 85: 24 studi; facili e melodici, in tutte le tonalita maggiori e minori [24 Easy Melodious Studies in All Major and Minor Keys]. Violin (1st Position). Milan: Ricordi, 1928.
- Op. 90: 25 Melodious Studies for Obtaining a Beautiful Tone on the Violin. London: Schott, 1928.
- Op. 91: 24 studi melodici per il conseguimento di un bel suono sul violino [24 Melodious Studies for Obtaining a Beautiful Tone on the Violin]. Milan: Ricordi, 1929.
- Op. 94: 30 études mélodiques: pour obtenir un beau son au violon [30 Melodic Studies: for Obtaining a Beautiful Tone on the Violin]. Violin. Paris: Leduc, 1930.
- Op. 95: 26 Melodische Etüden für die G-Saite der Violine [26 Melodic Studies for the G String of the Violin]. Violin. Mainz: Schott, 1930.
- Op. 97: Libro di melodie. 30 pezzi facili [Book of Melodies. 30 Easy Pieces]. Violin (1st and 3rd Position). Milan: Ricordi, 1930.
- Op. 98: Album de la jeunesse: 30 pièces in 2 volumes [Album for the Young: 30 Pieces in 2 Volumes]. Violin. Paris: Leduc, 1931. Published in 2 volumes: Vol. 1: 1-15, Vol. 2: 16-30.

Violin and Piano

- Op. 2: 2 Lieder ohne Worte [2 Songs without Words]. Violin and Piano. Berlin: Bote & Bock, 1895.
- Op. 3: Stimmungen: 6 Stücke [Moods: 6 Pieces]. Violin and Piano. Berlin: Ries & Erler, 1893.
- Op. 10: 4 Lieder ohne Worte [4 Songs without Words]. Violin and Piano. Berlin: Bote & Bock, 1894.
- Op. 15: Lose Blätter: 8 kleine Stimmungsbilder [Loose Leaves: 8 Little Mood Pictures]. Violin and Piano. Berlin: Ries & Erler, 1897.
- Op. 17: 3 Stücke [3 Pieces]. Violin and Piano. Boston: B. F. Wood Music, 1897.
- Op. 20: 3 Stücke [3 Pieces]. Violin and Piano. Berlin: Ries & Erler, 1898.
- Op. 22: Hexentanz [Witches Dance]. Violin and Piano. Berlin: Bote & Bock, 1899.
- Op. 24: 2 Stücke [2 Pieces]. Violin and Piano. Berlin: Plothow, 1899.
- Op. 25: 6 Bagatellen [6 Bagatelles]. Violin (1st Position) and Piano. Berlin: Plothow, 1899.
- Op. 26: 5 leichte Stücke [5 Easy Pieces]. Violin (1st Position) and Piano. Leipzig: Kistner, 1900.
- Op. 28: Miniaturen, 8 leichte Stücke [Miniatures, 8 Easy Pieces]. Violin (1st Position) and Piano. Leipzig: Rahter, 1900.
- Op. 31: 6 Bagatellen [6 Bagatelles]. Violin (1st Position) and Piano. Leipzig: A. P. Schmidt, 1901.
- Op. 32: 4 Stücke [4 Pieces]. Violin and Piano. Copenhagen: Wilhelm Hansen, 1904.
- Op. 33: Tonbilder. 5 Stücke [Tonepoems. 5 Pieces]. Violin and Piano. Leipzig: Kistner, 1903.
- Op. 38: Melodienreihe. 8 leichte Stücke [Song Cycle. 8 Easy Pieces]. Violin (1st Position) and Piano. Leipzig: Kistner, 1905.
- Op. 41: Aquarellen. 5 leichte Tonstücke [Water Colors. 5 Easy Tone Pieces]. Violin and Piano. Leipzig: C. F. Kahnt, 1906.
- Op. 42: Skizzen. 4 Stücke [Sketches. 4 Pieces]. Violin (1st Position) and Piano. Leipzig: Kistner, 1906.
- Op. 50: Albumblätter: 3 Stücke [Albumleaves: 3 Pieces]. Violin (1st and 3rd Position) and Piano. Leipzig: Zimmermann, 1909.
- Op. 52: Arabesken. 6 mittelschwere Stücke [Arabesques. 6 Moderately Difficult Pieces]. Violin and Piano. Leipzig: Steingräber, 1911.
- Op. 53: Stimmungsbilder. 6 Vortragsstücke [Mood Pictures. 6 Concert Pieces]. Violin and Piano. Leipzig: Rahter, 1911.
- Op. 61: Jungend-Album. 10 leichte Stückchen [Album for the Young. 10 Easy Little Pieces]. Violin (1st Position) and Piano. Leipzig: Zimmermann, 1919.
- Op. 63: Libro d’immagini, Dieci piccoli pezzi [Picture Book. Ten Little Pieces]. Violin (1st Position) and Piano. Milan: Ricordi, 1923.
- Op. 64: 12 Various Sketches. Violin and Piano. London: Schott, 1923.
- Op. 65: Für die Jungend. 12 leichte Stücke [For the Young. 12 Easy Pieces]. Violin (1st Position) and Piano. Leipzig: Bosworth, 1926. The German Edition has 12 pieces published in two volumes—1-6 and 7-12. Piratenzug [March of the Pirates] is #6 in this set.
- Op. 65: For the Young. Ten Easy Pieces. Violin (1st Position) and Piano. New York: Bosworth, 1924. This is the same music as the German edition listed above, but published as sheet music in 10 parts. (The 12 pieces from the German edition are numbered: 1a/1b, 2, 3, 4, 5, 6, 7a/7b, 8, 9 and 10.) March of the Pirates is #5 in this set.
- Op. 79: 9 piéces mélodiques [9 Melodic compositions]. Violin and Piano. Paris: Leduc, 1927. Published in 3 parts: 1-3, 4-6, 7-9.
- Op. 81: Für die junge Welt [For Young People]. 10 moderately easy pieces. Violin and Piano. London: Schott, 1928.
- Op. 83: Décameron mélodique: 10 pièces faciles [Melodic Tales: 10 Easy Pieces]. Violin (1st Position) and Piano. London: Schott & Co., 1928.

Chamber Works

- Op. 34: 2 Phantasiestücke [2 Fantasy Pieces]. 2 Violins and Piano. Leipzig: Kistner, 1904.
- Op. 39: 5 Characterstücke [5 Character Pieces]. 3 Violins. Leipzig: Bosworth, 1905.
- Op. 59: Kinder-Symphonie [Children’s Symphony]. Piano, 2 Violins, Cello and 7 Children's Instruments (Cuckoo in E/C#, Quail in E, Trumpet in A, Triangle, Ratchet, Drum and Cymbal). Leipzig: Zimmermann, ca. 1920.
- Op. 88: Acquarelli. 6 pezzi [Watercolors. 6 Pieces]. 2 Violins and Piano. Milan: Ricordi, 1929.
