= Markees Stradivarius =

Early 18th century violin

The Markees is a violin made by Italian luthier Antonio Stradivari of Cremona. It was created in 1701. The violin is owned by the Music Chamber of Hong Kong, having been purchased in 2004 from a professor at the Juilliard School of Music. It was loaned to Leung Kin-fung, concertmaster of the Hong Kong Philharmonic, but has been returned.

The Markees is one of six Stradivari violins that have been preserved with the original varnish. It was previously owned by Professor Karl Markees (1865–1926), a Swiss violinist who studied under Joseph Joachim.
