= Joachim monument =

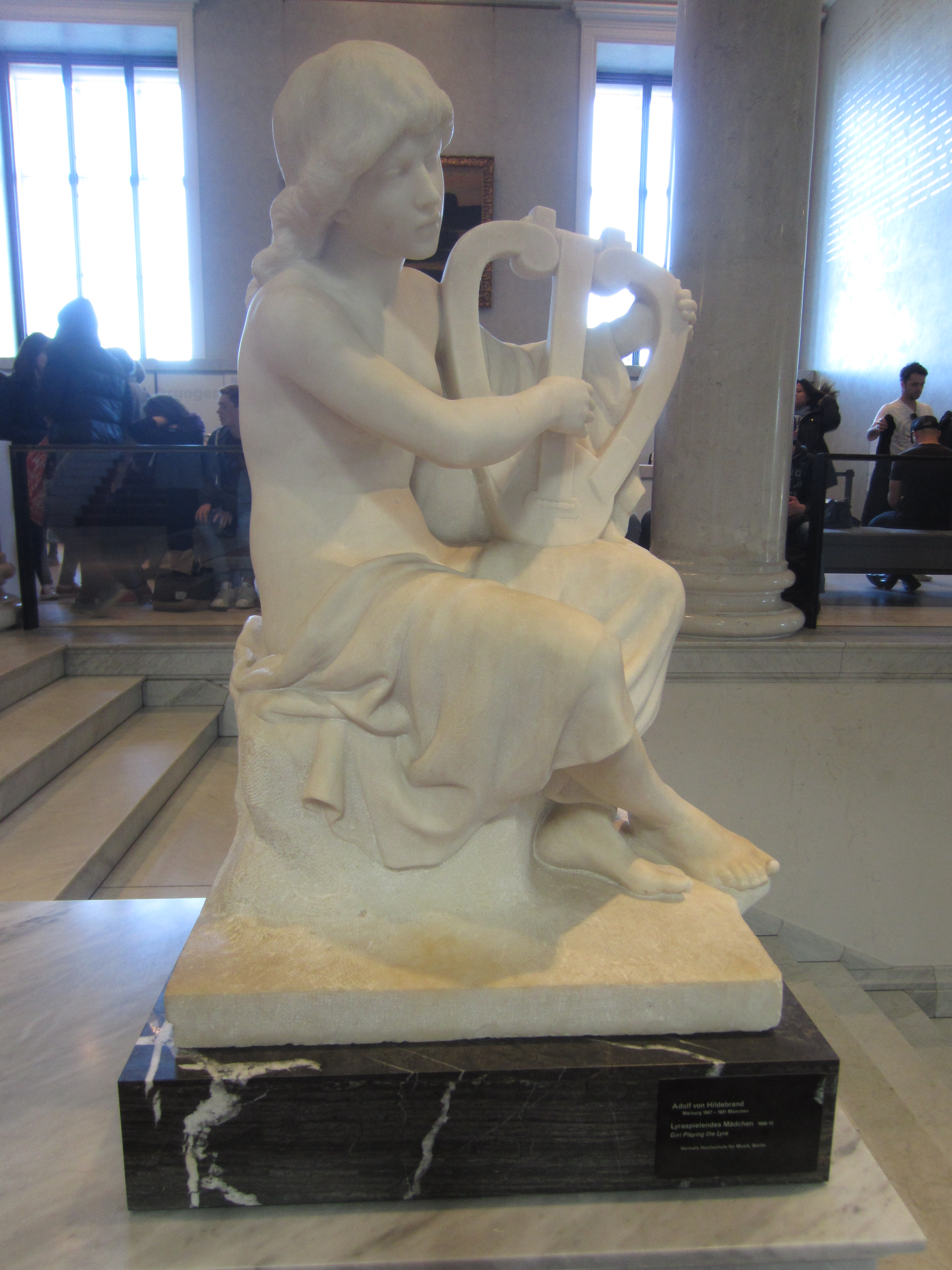
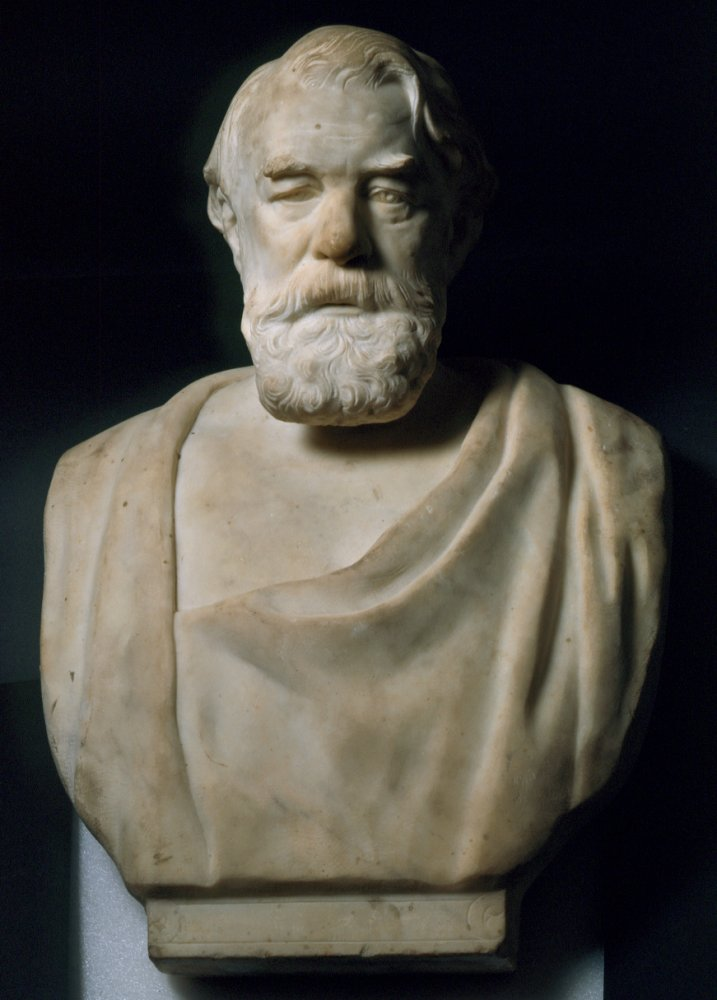
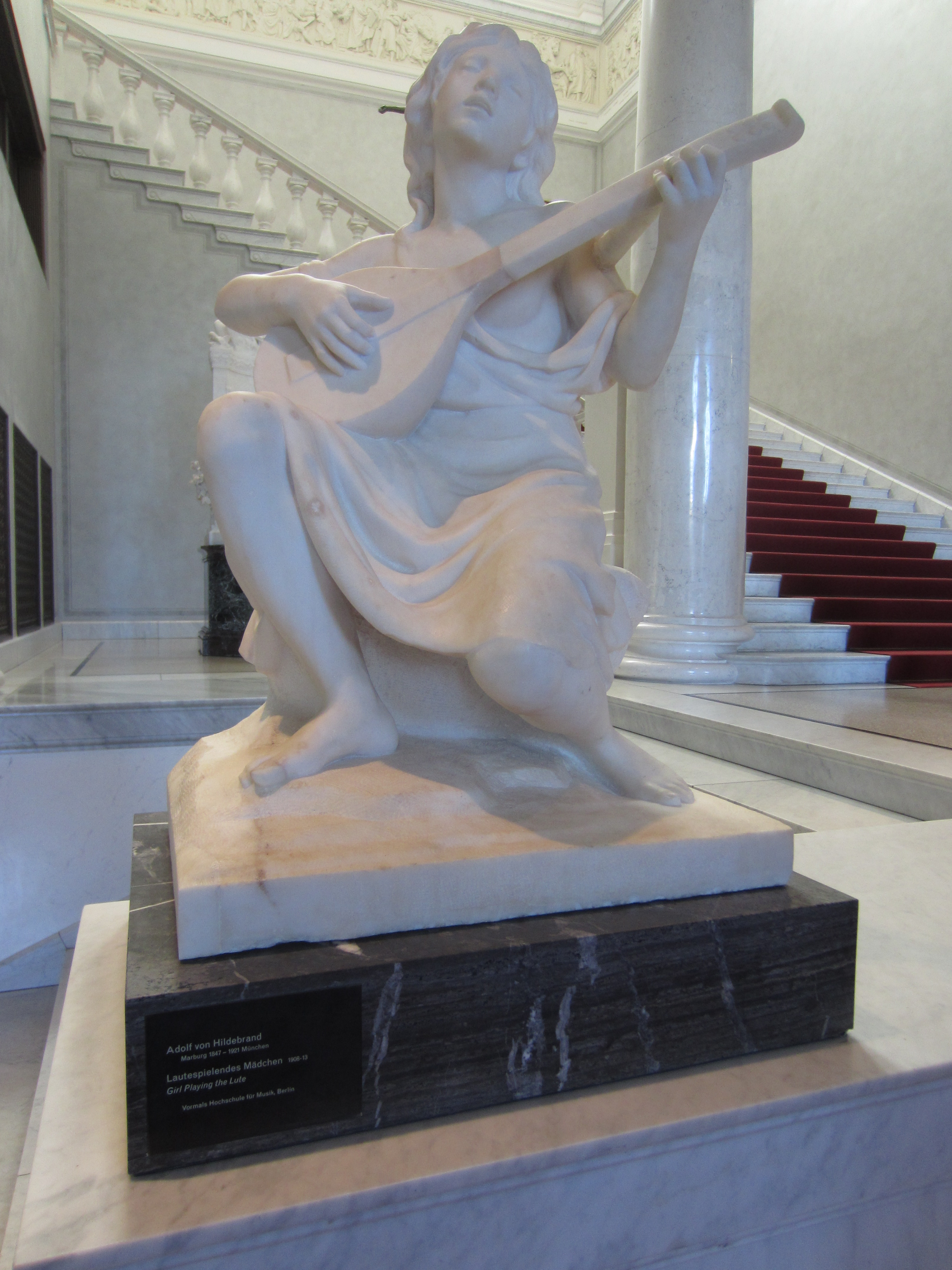
Girl Playing the Lyre (left) and Girl Playing the Lute (right), today in the Alte Nationalgalerie, which originally flanked a bust of Joachim (center).

The Joachim monument (Joachimdenkmal) was a monument to Hungarian composer and teacher Joseph Joachim sculpted by Adolf von Hildebrand. It is today best known for two of its component sculptures, Girl Playing the Lyre (Lyraspielendes Mädchen) and Girl Playing the Lute (Lautespielendes Mädchen), both now in the Alte Nationalgalerie in Berlin, Germany.

== History ==
The monument was commissioned in 1909 and unveiled on June 5, 1913, in the great hall of the Hochschule für Musik Berlin (now the Berlin University of the Arts). Joachim had been the director of that institute many years. The monument was funded by subscription, including by the Mendelssohn family.

The monument had at its centre a bust of Joachim flanked on either side by two statues of girls playing a Lyre and a Lute. Alte Nationalgalerie describes the bust as having a "visionary" look. It was partially based on a previous bust Hildebrand had created of Joachim.

Due to Joachim's Jewish heritage the monument was dismantled in 1938, during the Nazi period, and the sculptures moved to a basement. This ironically saved the statues from destruction when the great hall was destroyed in a bombing raid.
