= Eduard Rappoldi =

Austrian violinist

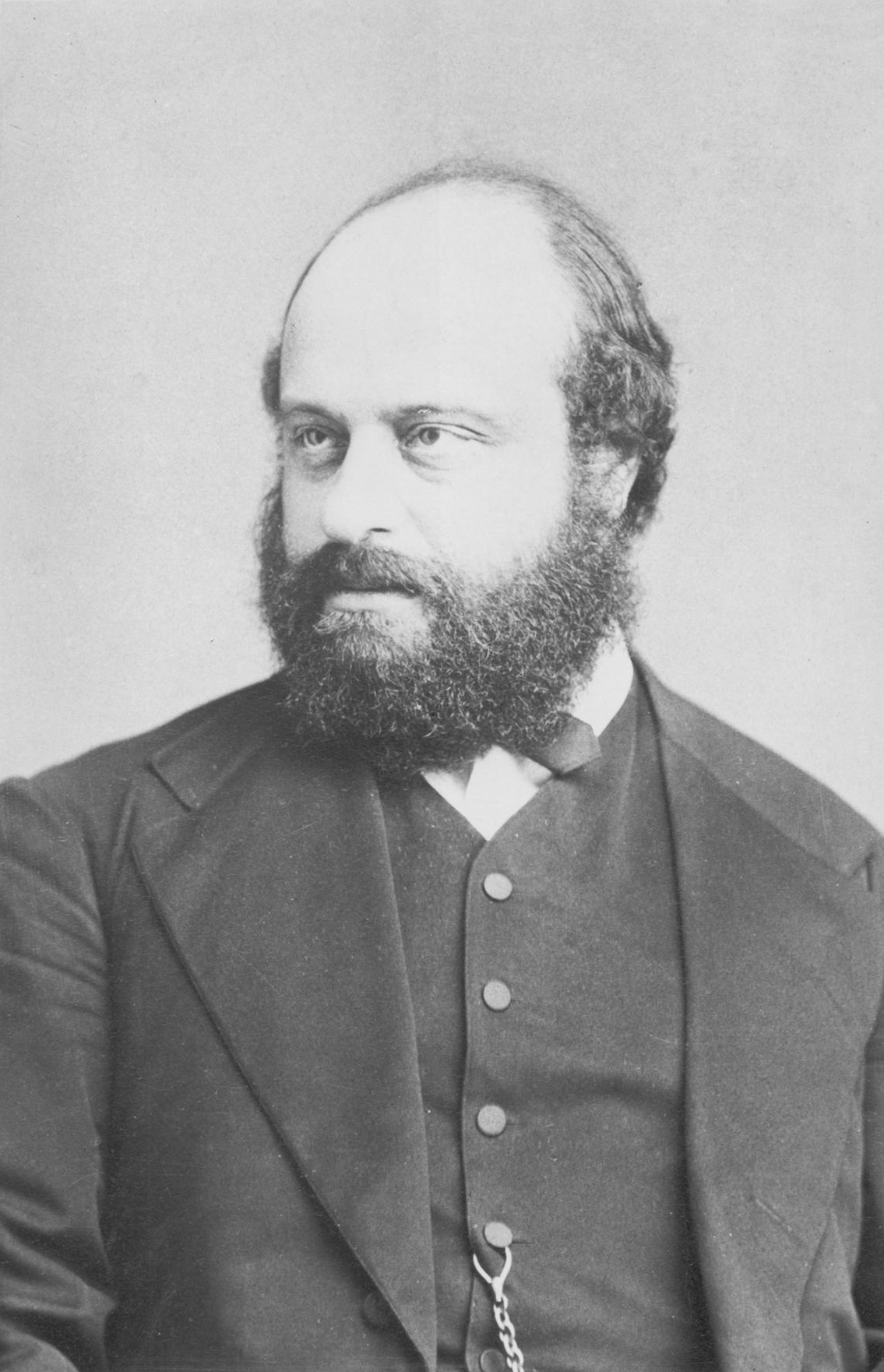
Eduard Rappoldi (between 1871 and 1877)

Eduard Rappoldi, real name Eduard Rappold (21 February 1839 – 16 May 1903) was an Austrian violinist and composer.

== Life ==
Born in Vienna, Rappoldi played piano and violin as a child, and was already performing his own compositions at the age of seven. He was a pupil of Leopold Jansa and Josef Böhm and from 1854, a student at the Konservatorium der Gesellschaft der Musikfreunde in Vienna with Georg Hellmesberger Sr. In addition to his violin studies, Rappoldi studied composition under Simon Sechter in Vienna and later with Ferdinand Hiller.

Rappoldi was a member of the orchestra of the Vienna Court Opera from 1854 until 1861. After a time (1861–66) as concert master of the Deutschen Oper in Rotterdam he was Kapellmeister in Lübeck, Stettin, and Prague. In 1871 he joined the faculty at the Königliche Hochschule für Musik in Berlin and played viola in the Joachim Quartet. In 1877 Rappoldi left Berlin for Dresden, where he was concert master of the Dresden Königliche Kapelle until 1898, and königlichen-sächsischen Professor at the Dresden Conservatory (today the Hochschule für Musik Carl Maria von Weber).

Rappoldi composed two string quartets, small symphonies and sonatas for violin and piano, as well as about 30 songs.

Rappoldi was important as a string quartet player. He led a quartet in Rotterdam and in Dresden. With the latter quartet he gave a performance of all of the Beethoven quartets (including the Grosse Fuge, Op. 133) as a cycle during the 1888–89 season and in 1892–93. The more famous Joachim Quartet performed the Beethoven cycle for the first time fifteen years later in 1903, and they never included the Grosse Fuge.

In 1870, he met the pianist Laura Kahrer (1853-1925), whom he married four years later. They had five children, one of which was the violinist Adrian Rappoldi (1876–1948).

Rappoldi died in Dresden at the age of 64.
