= Violin Concerto No. 2 (Joachim) =

Violin Concerto No. 2 in D Minor "in the Hungarian Manner", Op.11 is a Romantic violin concerto written by violinist Joseph Joachim (1831–1907). Rarely performed, it has been described as "the Holy Grail of Romantic violin concertos." by music critic David Hurwitz.

== Structure ==
The work is in three movements that are marked:

1. Allegro un poco maestoso
2. Romanze; Andante
3. Finale alla Zingara: Allegro con spirito

The "Hungarian Manner" is in keeping with the Joachim's Hungarian heritage. However, like most people of the time, he did not distinguish between Hungarian folk music and gypsy music.

This is a very long work (with a playing time over 45 minutes) and thus is a very difficult piece for the soloist. Practicing it has been likened by the violinist Rachel Barton Pine to "training to run a marathon".

== Performance history ==
Alan Walker claims that Joachim performed the concerto, with Franz Liszt conducting, on 3 October 1853 in Karlsruhe on the opening day of the Karlsruhe Music Festival. This is incorrect: the concerto performed on that occasion was Joachim's Op. 3, Violin Concerto in One Movement in G minor (1851), dedicated to Franz Liszt.

The "Hungarian" Violin Concerto, op. 11 was written in the summer of 1857, given its premiere on 24 March 1860 in Hanover, and published by Breitkopf and Härtel in 1861. (See Beatrix Borchard, Stimme und Geige, Böhau, 2005, ISBN 3-205-77242-3, accompanying CD)

== Selected discography ==
- the first recording was made in 1972 by Aaron Rosand for Vox label | "Joseph Joachim, Violinkonzert D-Moll In Ungarischer Weise / Jenö Hubay*, Hejre Kati Für Violine Und Orchester / George Enescu, Prélude Pour Violon Solo | original LP release: Vox-Candide – CE 31 064 (p)1972 / CD reprint: Vox-box CDX 5102 (p)1993.
- Violin Concerto No. 2 in D minor, Op. 11 "In the Hungarian Style" by Joseph Joachim. Paired with the Violin Concerto in D major, Op. 77 by Johannes Brahms. Performed by Rachel Barton Pine (Violin) with the Chicago Symphony Orchestra conducted by Carlos Kalmar. Cedille Records: CDR 90000 068
- Joseph Joachim: Violin Concerto in D minor in the Hungarian Style, Op. 11, coupled with Violin Concerto in G minor in one movement Op. 3. Performed by Suyoen Kim (violin) and the Staatskapelle Weimar conducted by Michael Halász (Naxos Records, recorded February 2008).
