= Beatrix Borchard =

German musicologist and author

- Born: 1950 (age 75–76); Lingen, West Germany (now Germany)
- Occupation: Musicologist
- Organizations: Hochschule der Künste Berlin; Brahms Institute; Goethe-Institut; Hochschule für Musik und Theater Hamburg

Beatrix Borchard (born 1950) is a German musicologist and author. The focus of her publications is the life and work of female and male musicians, such as Clara and Robert Schumann, Amalie and Joseph Joachim, Pauline Viardot-Garcia, and Adriana Hölszky. Also among her topics are the role of music in the process of Jewish assimilation, the history of musical interpretation, and strategies of Kulturvermittlung.

== Career ==
Borchard was born and grew up in Lingen, Germany. She studied musicology, German studies, and history in Bonn and Berlin. She wrote her dissertation about Clara Wieck and Robert Schumann. In 2000, she wrote her habilitation about Amalie and Joseph Joachim. She has been the editor of the Viardot-Garcia studies, and of the online encyclopedia MUGI of Hamburg University. Together with Kerstin Schüssler-Bach she has been the editor of the Brahms studies of the Brahms Society.

Beatrix Borchard was a lecturer of musicology at the Hochschule der Künste Berlin for ten years. She has worked for the Goethe-Institut, in Germany and in countries such as China, Portugal and Romania. She was professor of musicology of the Musikwissenschaftliches Seminar Detmold-Paderborn of the Paderborn University for a short time. In 2002 she was appointed professor of musicology at the Hochschule für Musik und Theater Hamburg. She is head of a project Orte und Wege europäischer Kulturvermittlung durch Musik (Locations and paths of European cultural exchange by music), which is sponsored by the Deutsche Forschungsgemeinschaft (DFG).

Beatrix Borchard was the author of several radio features, has been moderator of concerts, and made two films for the NDR, one a documentary about Clara Schumann (NDR 1996) and another about Hausmusik (NDR 1997). She collaborated on other music films. A documentary about the sisters Maria Malibran and Pauline Viardot, including a biography of the singer Pauline Viardot, is planned to appear in 2018.

== Work ==
- Clara Schumann. Ein Leben. Ullstein, Frankfurt/Main – Berlin 1991 (four editions), ISBN 3-548-35367-3
- Clara Schumann. Ihr Leben. Eine biographische Montage. 3rd edition Olms, Hildesheim 2015, ISBN 978-3-487-08553-1; review

Borchard was an editor of the following works:

- Adriana Hölszky. Klangportraits vol. 1, Furore Verlag; Musikfrauen, Berlin 1991
- with Monika Schwarz-Danuser: Fanny Hensel geb. Mendelssohn Bartholdy. Komponieren zwischen Geselligkeitsideal und romantischer Musikästhetik. 2nd edition, Furore Verlag, Kassel 2002, ISBN 3-927327-54-9
- with Cornelia Bartsch and Rainer Cadenbach: Der weibliche und der männliche Beethoven, Bonn 2004, ISBN 978-3-88188-080-0
- with Claudia Maurer Zenck: Alkestis: Interpretationen (= Hamburger Jahrbuch für Musikwissenschaft 2006), Frankfurt/Main 2006, ISBN 978-3-631-56183-6
- with Heidy Zimmermann: Musikwelten – Lebenswelten. Jüdische Identitätssuche in der deutschen Musikkultur. Böhlau, Köln / Weimar / Wien 2009 (series Jüdische Moderne, volume. 9), ISBN 978-3-412-20254-5
