= Laura Rappoldi =

Austro-German classical pianist

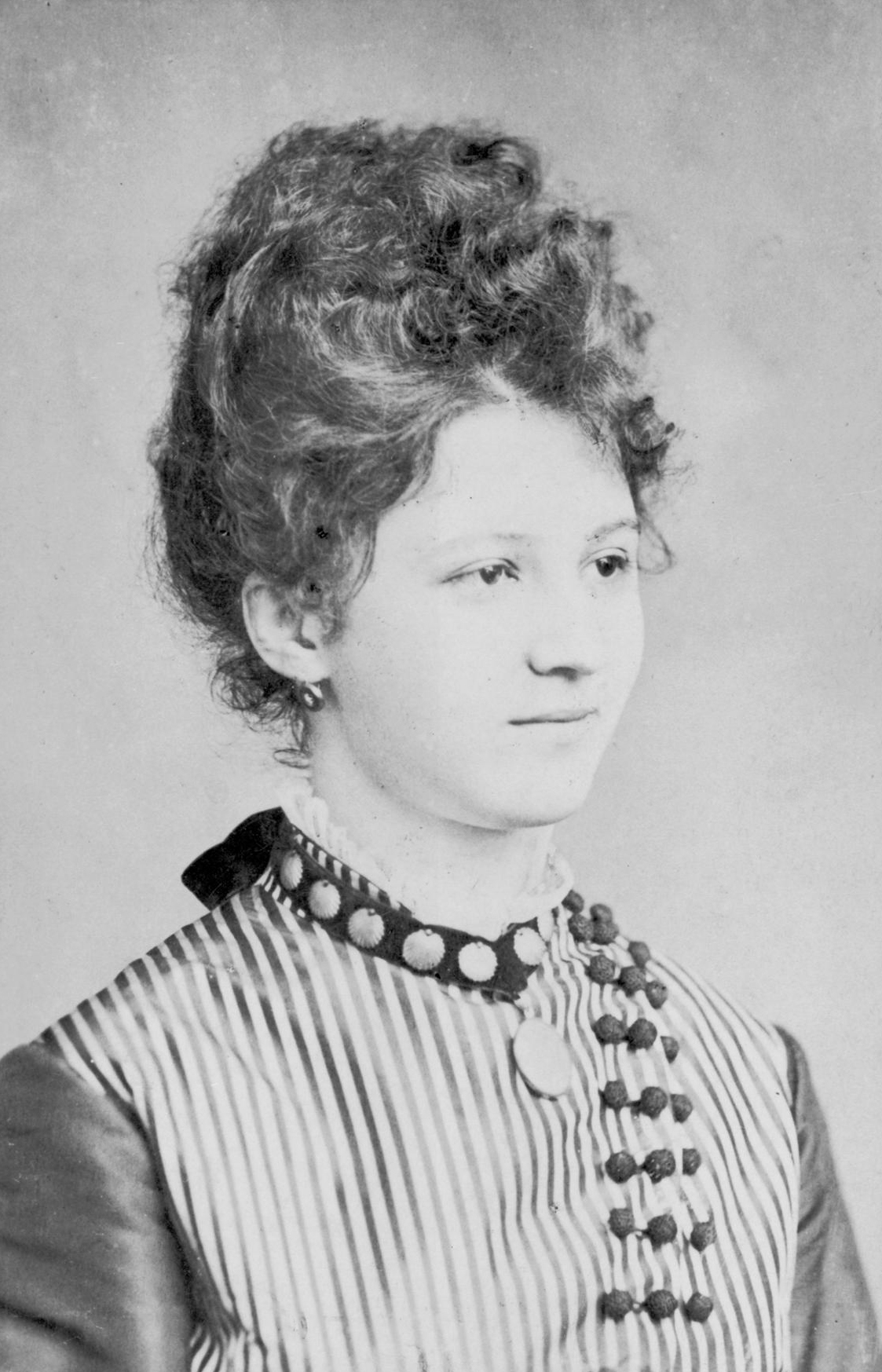
Laura Rappoldi

Laura Rappoldi (14 January 1853 – 2 August 1925) was a pianist and composer from Austria-Hungary.

== Life ==
Born in Mistelbach, Laura Kahrer, daughter of a civil servant, received music lessons at an early age and piano lessons from the age of ten. Already at the age of eleven, she wrote her own compositions. Encouraged by Emperor Elisabeth, she received further training from 1866 to 1869 at the Vienna Conservatory, among others from Josef Dachs, Felix Otto Dessoff and Anton Bruckner. In 1868, she won first prize in a competition for piano and composition. Another sponsor was Anton Rubinstein. In 1870 and 1873, Kahrer was a pupil of Franz Liszt in Weimar. In 1871 and 1872, s he studied with Adolf Henselt in St. Petersburg, and in 1874 with Hans von Bülow in Munich.

She and her family also made concert tours of Germany, Poland and Russia in the 1870s. The plan of a trip to America was not pursued any further after the death of her mother (1873) and father (1875).

In 1874, Kahrer married the Viennese musician Eduard Rappoldi (1831-1903) in Stettin, whom she already met 1870 during a common concert in Prague. In 1877, her husband was appointed a royal Saxon professor. In 1876, their son Adrian Rappoldi was born. The couple had five children.

The couple made further concert tours together: 1877 and 1878 to Denmark, 1878 again to Denmark, in the land of Oldenburg and through the northern and western countries of the German Empire, in 1880 and 1881 to Austria and England, among others. In 1885 and 1886, she travelled with Amalie Joachim on a European tour through Germany, Austria, Russia, Switzerland and Hungary.

Chamber music evenings were popular, where Rappoldi performed together with her husband (later also her son). The Kingdom of Saxony appointed her Royal Saxon Chamber Virtuoso in 1879. At the end of the 1880s, Rappoldi settled in Dresden at her husband's request and from 1890 she gave piano lessons at the Hochschule für Musik Carl Maria von Weber. She was appointed professor in 1911. From 1921, she directed master classes for piano playing.

Rappoldi died in Dresden at the age of 72.
