= Allgemeine deutsche Musikzeitung =

German musical journal

The Allgemeine deutsche Musikzeitung (subtitled: Wochenschrift für die Reform des Musiklebens der Gegenwarts) was a musical specialist journal, which appeared from 1874 to 1884, first in Leipzig and Kassel, then in Charlottenburg. In the early years it was called Allgemeine Deutsche Musik-Zeitung – Wochenschrift für das gesammte musikalische Leben der Gegenwart.

From 1878 to 1881, the music critic Wilhelm Tappert, a "defender of the New German School" was its editor. From 1881 to 1884, the composer Otto Leßmann was the owner and editor (he too was "active in a progressive sense"). Among the regular contributors was the music writer Heinrich Reimann, the organist and music writer Albert Heintz (responsible for the theme "Richard Wagner"), the composer Luise Adolpha Le Beau as well as Hans von Bülow, whose Skandinavische Concertreiseskizzen were published from April to May 1882.

In 1885, the Allgemeine deutsche Musikzeitung merged with the Allgemeine Musikzeitung, still with Otto Leßmann in double management.
