= Wilhelm Tappert =

German music critic

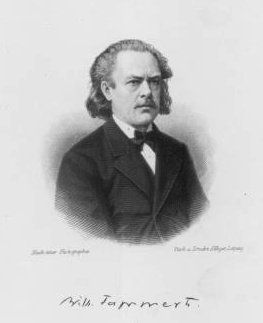
Wilhelm Tappert

Wilhelm Tappert (19 February 1830 – 27 October 1907) was a German composer and music writer.

== Life ==
Born in Ober-Thomaswaldau in the Province of Silesia, Tappert trained as a school teacher and made musical studies under Siegfried Wilhelm Dehn and Adolph Kullak in Berlin from 1856-1858. He settled there in 1866 and worked as a music critic and teacher. From 1876 until 1880, Tappert edited the Allgemeine deutsche Musikzeitung. He worked mainly as a teacher and music critic.

At the beginning of 1897, he was accused of being corrupt. After the unfavourable settlement in court, he handed in his resignation to his newspaper, the Kleinen Journal, which the newspaper did not accept.

Tappert published music theoretical writings as well as piano pieces, songs, arrangements of old German songs with piano accompaniment and a selection of old lute pieces.

Tappert died in Berlin at the age of 77.

== Publications ==
- Hurenaquarium und andere Unhöflichkeiten : Richard Wagner im Spiegel der zeitgenössischen Kritik.
- Wandernde Melodien; eine musikalische Studie.
- Für und wider : eine Blumenlese aus den Berichten über die Aufführungen des Bühnenweihfestspieles Parsifal.
