= Amalie Joachim =

Austrian-German singer and voice teacher (1839–1899)

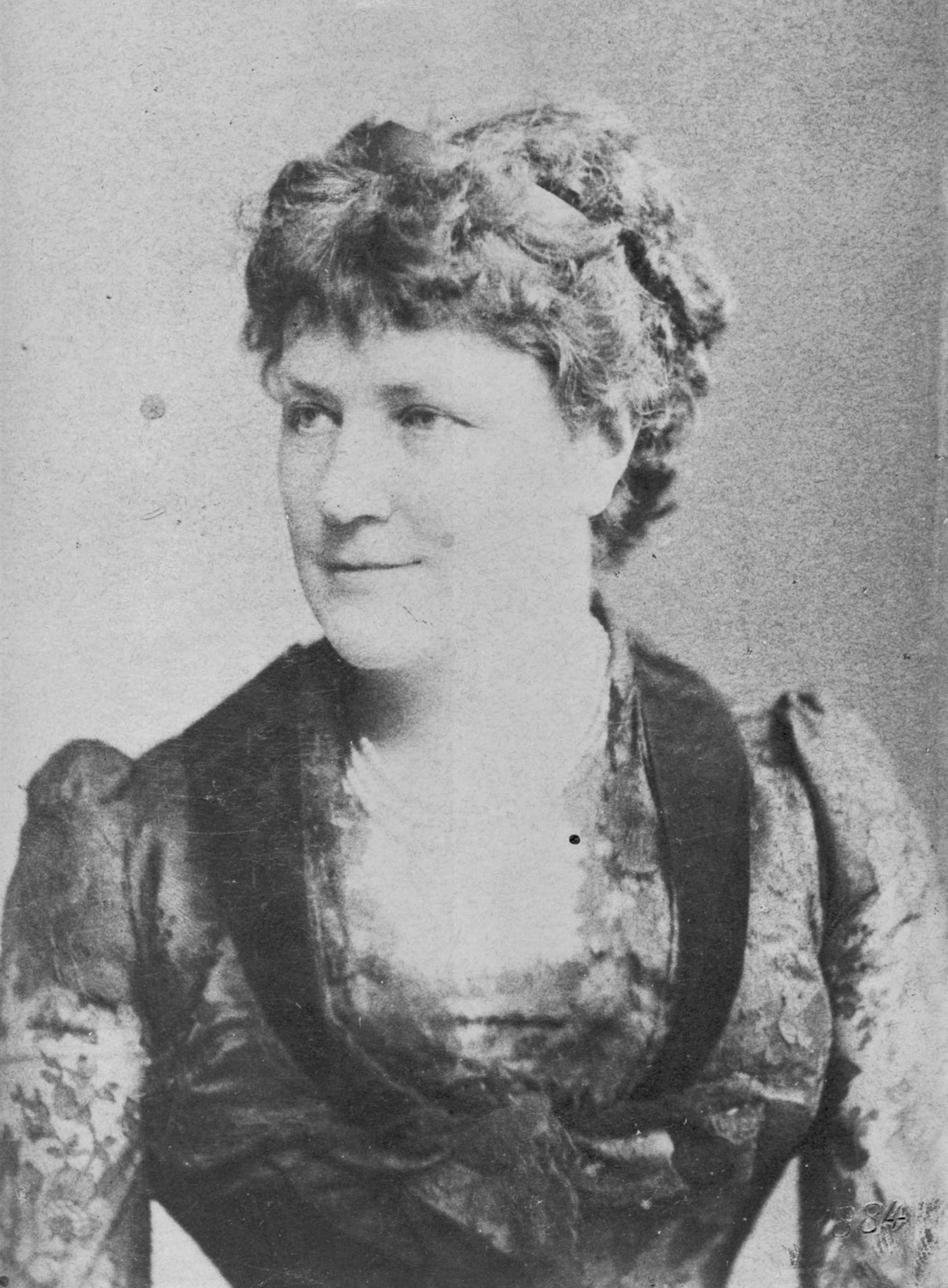
- Born: Amalie Marie Schneeweiss; 10 May 1839; Marburg, Austrian Empire (now Maribor, Slovenia)
- Died: 3 February 1899 (aged 59); Königsfeld, Rhineland-Palatinate, Germany
- Other name: Amalie Weiss
- Occupations: Classical operatic contralto; Voice teacher
- Organizations: Opernhaus Hannover
- Spouse: Joseph Joachim

Amalie Marie Joachim (10 May 1839 – 3 February 1899) was an Austrian-German contralto, working in opera and concert and as voice teacher. She was the wife of the violinist Joseph Joachim, and a friend of both Clara Schumann and Johannes Brahms, with whom she made international tours.

== Career ==
Born Amalie Marie Schneeweiss in Maribor, Austrian Empire (now Maribor, Slovenia), she was the daughter of Franz Max Schneeweiss and his wife Eleonore, née Lindes. The family moved to Graz in the early 1850s. She appeared on stage from age 14, under the stage name Amalie Weiss. Her performing career started in Troppau via Hermannstadt eventually leading her to the Vienna Kärntnertortheater. In April 1862, she was engaged by the Opernhaus Hannover, where she had appeared as a guest several times. She was first alto. There, she met the concert master Joseph Joachim, whom she married on 10 June 1863 in the Schlosskirche. The couple had six children.

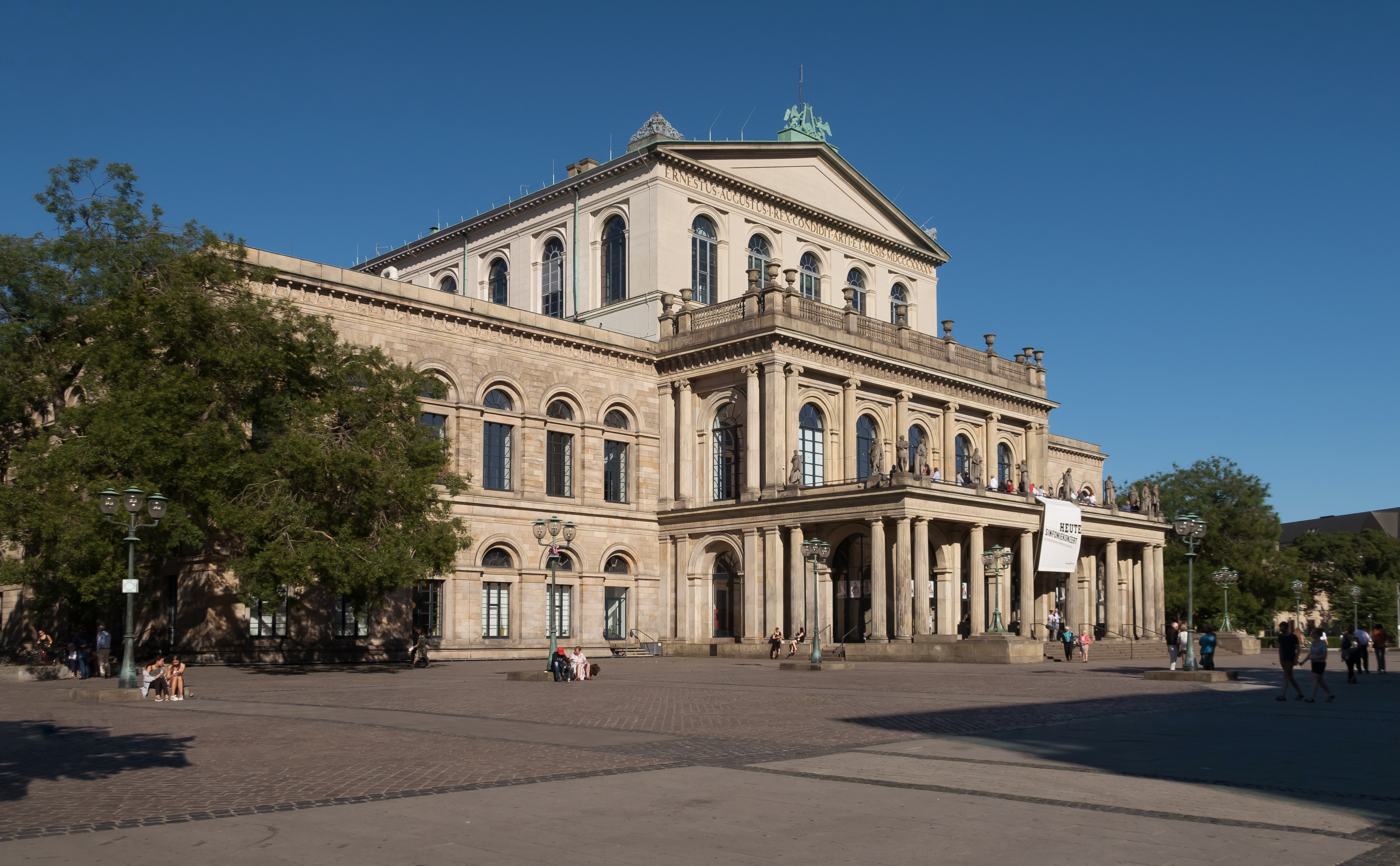
Opernhaus Hannover

Marriage in this era created tension for women within the realm of performance. Theatre directors had to give permission for female performers to marry, and it usually terminated the woman's contract automatically. With her marriage, Amalie retired from the stage, but she still performed as a concert singer, often together with her husband and Clara Schumann, a friend. They toured extensively, up to London. She participated in choral performances of the Sing-Akademie zu Berlin up to 1870, and became one of their honorary members.

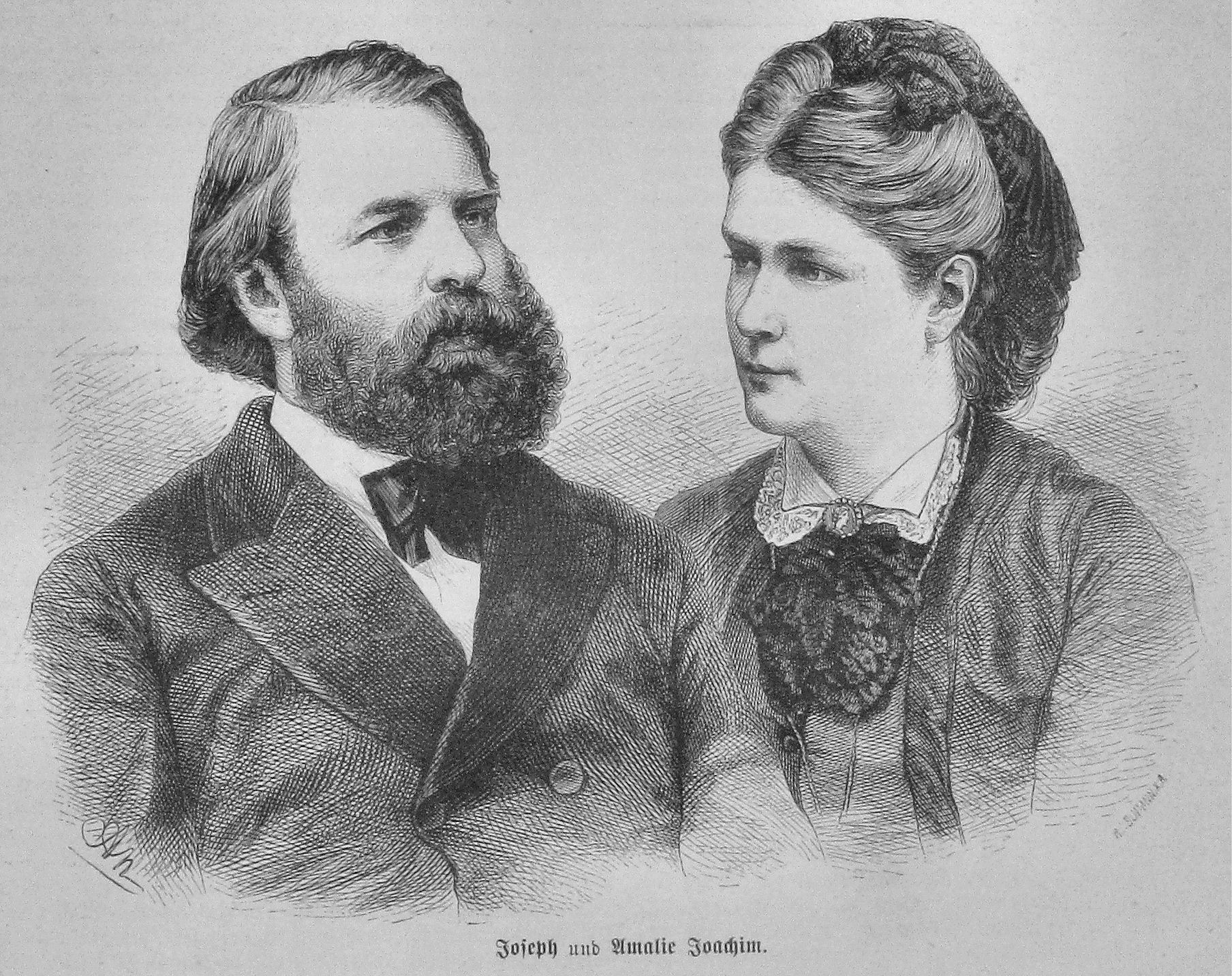
Joseph und Amalie Joachim, by Adolf Neumann, in Die Gartenlaube, 1873

Johannes Brahms dedicated his Two Songs for Voice, Viola and Piano to Amalie and her husband, which the three could perform together. He wrote one of the two songs for their wedding and the baptism of their first son, who was named Johannes after Brahms, and the other decades later with the intention to help the couple's troubled marriage.

Amalie was also a voice teacher and, on the recommendation of Johannes Brahms, Marie Fillunger studied under her at the Hochschule in Berlin in 1874.

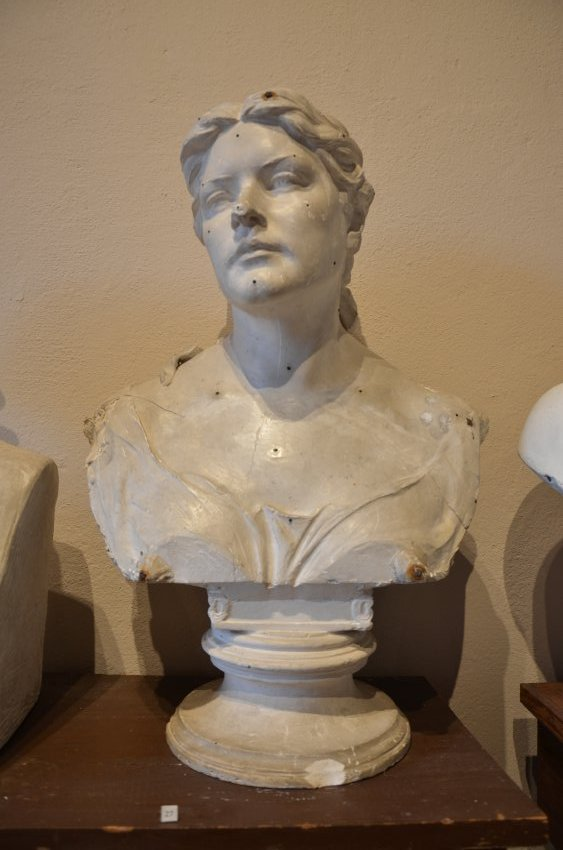
Plaster bust of Amalie Weiss Joachim by sculptor Elisabet Ney, executed in 1867 and commissioned by her husband, Joseph Joachim.

The marriage was dissolved after 21 years, after the jealous Joachim had accused her of adultery. Brahms defended her position. She performed more often after the divorce, to make money. With Joseph being a well-respected violinist, fans held off from supporting Amalie at first. She soon became irresistible and people decided they could support both her and Joseph. Brahms and Joseph's relationship suffered after the divorce while Brahms and Amalie stayed cordial. Her focus was on Lied and oratorio. She was often accompanied by the pianist Hans Schmidt. In 1885 and 1886 she toured with Laura Rappoldi from Dresden. On 1 February 1888, she premiered in Berlin at a Liederabend (recital) in Berlin the second song of Fünf Lieder, Op. 105, by Johannes Brahms. She founded a school of singing (Gesangsschule) in Berlin.

Joachim died in 1899 in Berlin due to complications from a gallbladder surgery and was buried at the Kaiser Wilhelm Memorial Cemetery.
