= Joseph Joachim =

Hungarian violinist, composer, and teacher (1831–1907)

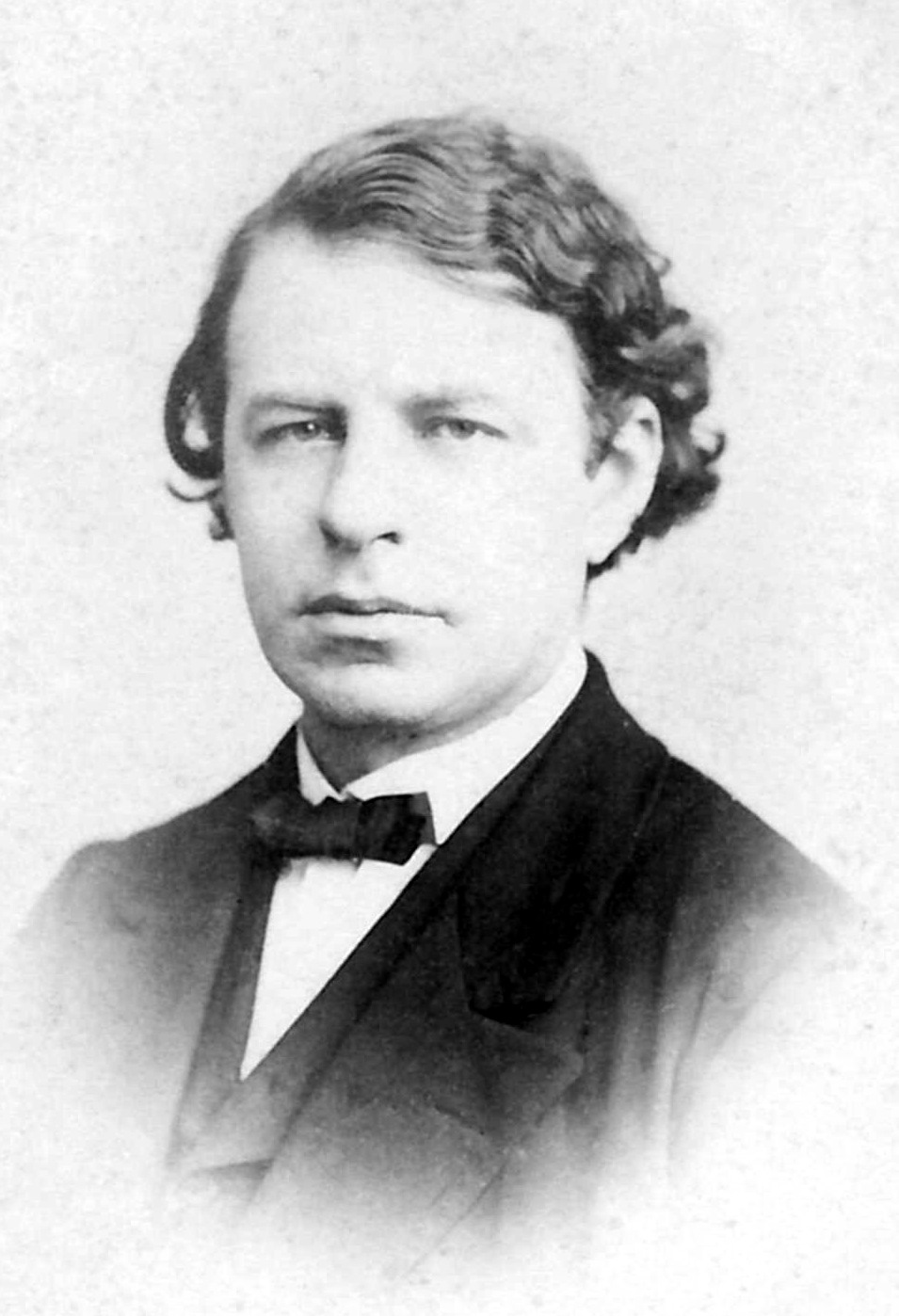
- Born: Joachim József; 28 June 1831; Köpcsény, Austrian Empire
- Died: 15 August 1907 (aged 76); Berlin, German Empire
- Education: Vienna Conservatory
- Occupations: Classical violinist; Conductor; Academic teacher
- Organizations: Gewandhausorchester; Opernhaus Hannover; Joachim Quartet
- Spouse: Amalie Joachim

Joseph Joachim (28 June 1831 – 15 August 1907) was a Hungarian violinist, conductor, composer and teacher who made an international career, based in Hanover and Berlin. A close collaborator of Johannes Brahms, he is widely regarded as one of the most distinguished violinists of the 19th century.

Joachim studied violin early, beginning in Buda at age five, then in Vienna and Leipzig. He made his debut in London in 1844, playing Ludwig van Beethoven's Violin Concerto, with Felix Mendelssohn conducting. He returned to London many times throughout life. After years of teaching at the Leipzig Conservatory and playing as principal violinist of the Gewandhausorchester, he moved to Weimar in 1848, where Franz Liszt established cultural life. From 1852, Joachim served at the court of Hanover, playing principal violin in the opera and conducting concerts, with months of free time in summer for concert tours. In 1853, he was invited by Robert Schumann to the Lower Rhine Music Festival, where he met Clara Schumann and Brahms, with whom he performed for years to come. In 1879, he premiered Brahms' Violin Concerto with Brahms as conductor. He married Amalie, an opera singer, in 1863, who gave up her career; the couple had six children.

Joachim quit service in Hanover in 1865, and the family moved to Berlin, where he was entrusted with founding and directing a new department at the Royal Conservatory, for performing music. He formed a string quartet, and kept performing chamber music on tours. His playing was recorded in 1903.

== Life ==
=== Origins ===
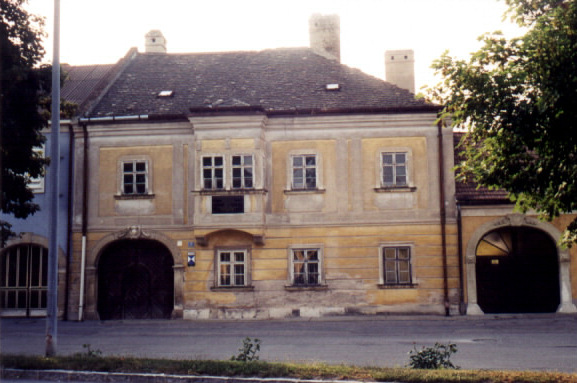
Joachim's birth house in Kittsee

Joachim was born in Köpcsény, Moson County, Kingdom of Hungary (present-day Kittsee in Burgenland, Austria). He was the seventh of eight children born to Julius, a wool merchant, and Fanny Joachim, who were of Hungarian-Jewish origin. He spent his childhood as a member of the Köpcsény Kehilla (Jewish community), one of Hungary's prominent Siebengemeinden ('Seven Communities') under the protectorate of the Esterházy family. He was a first cousin of Fanny Wittgenstein, née Figdor, the mother of Karl Wittgenstein and the grandmother of the philosopher Ludwig Wittgenstein and the pianist Paul Wittgenstein. His niece Maud Joachim (through his brother Henry) was one of the first British suffragettes to go on hunger strike in prison in protest at not being treated as a political prisoner.

=== Early career ===
In 1833 his family moved to Pest, which in 1873 was united with Buda and Óbuda to form Budapest. There from 1836 (age 5) he studied violin with the Polish violinist Stanisław Serwaczyński, the concertmaster of the opera in Pest, said to be the best violinist in Pest. Although Joachim's parents were "not particularly well off", they had been well advised to choose not just an "ordinary" violin teacher. Joachim's first public performance was 17 March 1839 when he was of age 7. (Serwaczyński later moved back to Lublin, Poland, where he taught Wieniawski.) In 1839, Joachim continued his studies at the Vienna Conservatory (briefly with Miska Hauser and Georg Hellmesberger, Sr.; finally – and most significantly – with Joseph Böhm, who introduced him to the world of chamber music). In 1843 he was taken by his cousin, Fanny Figdor, who later married "a Leipzig merchant" named Wittgenstein, to live and study in Leipzig. In the journal Neue Zeitschrift für Musik Robert Schumann was highly enthusiastic about Felix Mendelssohn, on which Moser writes "Only in Haydn's admiration for Mozart does the history of music know a parallel case of such ungrudging veneration of one great artist for his equal." in 1835, Mendelssohn had become director of the Leipzig Gewandhaus orchestra. In 1843 Joachim became a protégé of Mendelssohn, who arranged for him to study theory and composition with Moritz Hauptmann and violin with Ferdinand David. In his début performance in the Gewandhaus Joachim played the Otello Fantasy by Heinrich Wilhelm Ernst.

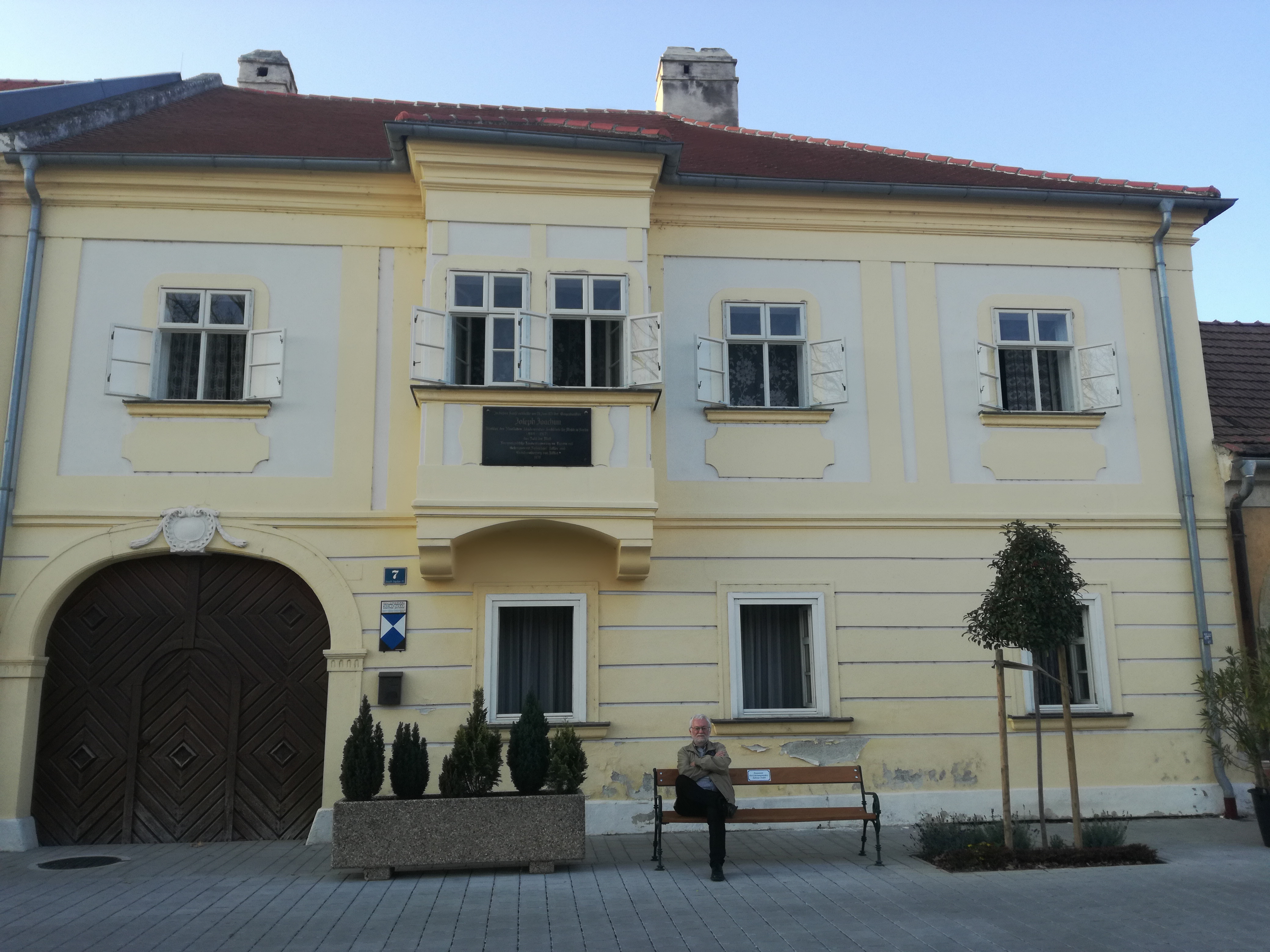
Joachim's birth house in Kittsee today

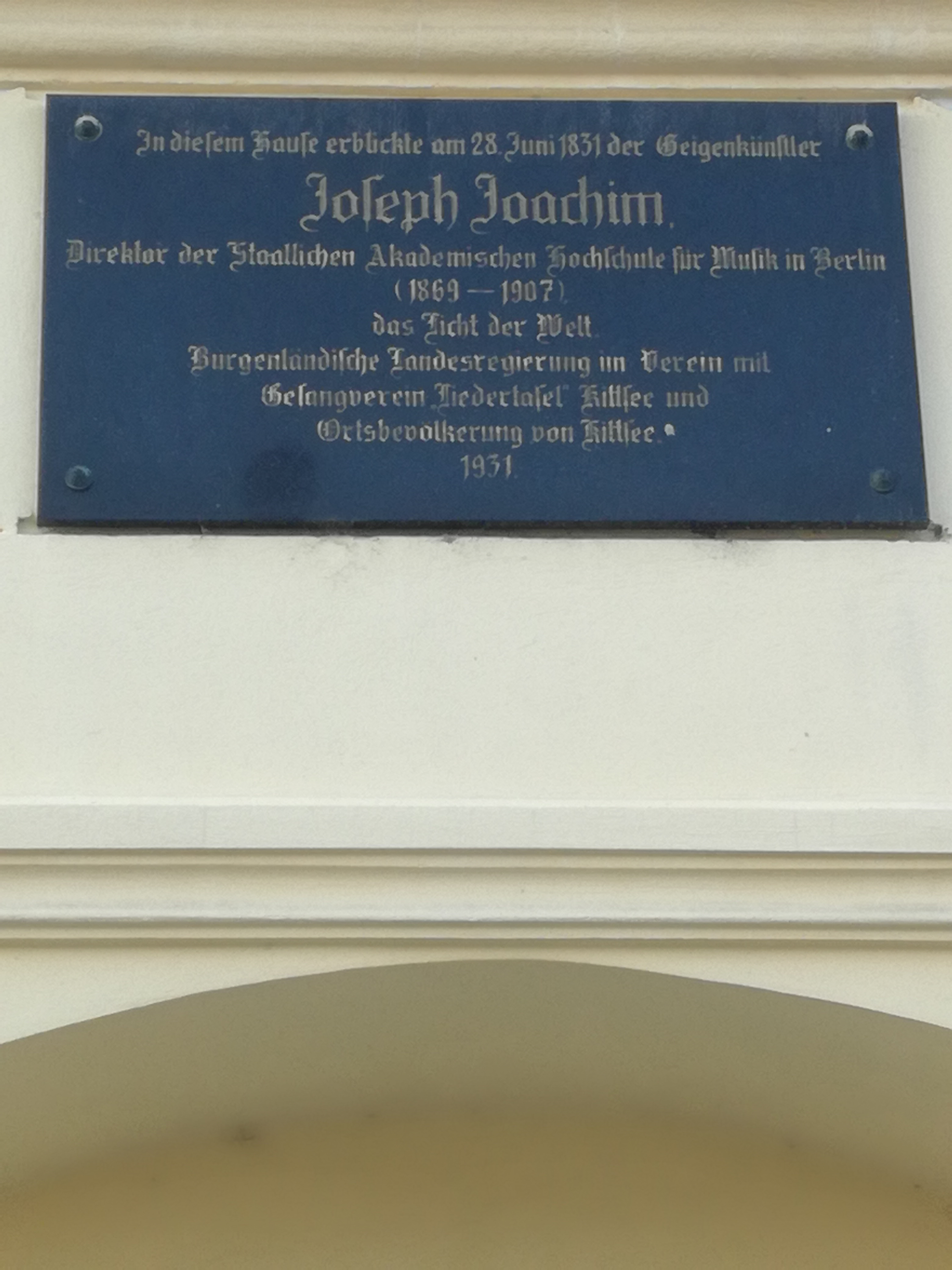
Memorial plaque on his birth house

==== London Philharmonic debut, Beethoven Violin Concerto ====
On 27 May 1844 Joachim, not quite 13, in his London debut with Mendelssohn conducting at a concert of the Philharmonic Society, played the solo part in Beethoven's Violin Concerto. This was a triumph in several respects, as described by R. W. Eshbach. The Philharmonic had a policy against performers so young, but an exception was made after auditions persuaded gatherings of distinguished musicians and music lovers that Joachim had mature capabilities. Despite Beethoven's recognition as one of the greatest composers, and the ranking nowadays of his violin concerto as among the greatest few, it was far from being so ranked before Joachim's performance. Ludwig Spohr had harshly criticized it, and after the London premiere by violinist Edward Eliason, a critic had said it "might have been written by any third or fourth rate composer." But Joachim was very well prepared to play Beethoven's concerto, having written his own cadenzas for it and memorized the piece. The audience anticipated great things, having got word from the rehearsal, and so, Mendelssohn wrote, "frenetic applause began" as soon as Joachim stepped in front of the orchestra. The beginning was applauded still more, and "cheers of the audience accompanied every ... part of the concerto." Reviewers also had high praise. One for 'The Musical World' wrote "The greatest violinists hold this concerto in awe ... Young Joachim ... attacked it with the vigour and determination of the most accomplished artist ... no master could have read it better," and the two cadenzas, written by Joachim, were "tremendous feats ... ingeniously composed". Another reviewer, for the 'Illustrated London News', wrote that Joachim "is perhaps the first violin player, not only of his age, but of his siècle" [century]. "He performed Beethoven's solitary concerto, which we have heard all the great performers of the last twenty years attempt, and invariably fail in ... its performance was an eloquent vindication of the master-spirit who imagined it." A third reviewer, for the 'Morning Post', wrote that the concerto "has been generally regarded by violin-players as not a proper and effective development of the powers of their instrument" but that Joachim's performance "is beyond all praise, and defies all description" and "was altogether unprecedented." Joachim remained a favorite with the English public for the rest of his career. He visited England in each year 1858, 1859, 1862 largely at the behest of his friend William Sterndale Bennett, and for several decades thereafter.

==== Beethoven string quartets ====
Moser (p. 28 ff.) writes "After the appearance of the six String Quartets (Op. 18) Beethoven had complete command of the field of chamber-music", although in the later quartets he "makes many exacting demands" of string players. Moser (p. 29) further writes that "at the time of Beethoven's death", such people as Spohr and Hauptmann did not necessarily esteem the late quartets above the earliest ones. Moser, p. 30 writes that in Vienna "the public showed a marked hostility toward" the late quartets. But Joachim's teacher Böhm had an appreciation of the late quartets, which he communicated to Joachim. At the age of 18, "in the whole of Germany" Joachim had no equal, either in the rendering of Bach or in the concertos of Beethoven and Mendelssohn; while as quartet player, "he had no cause to fear rivalry."

=== Maturity ===
Following Mendelssohn's death in 1847, Joachim stayed briefly in Leipzig, teaching at the Conservatorium and playing on the first desk of the Gewandhaus Orchestra with Ferdinand David, whom Mendelssohn had appointed concertmaster on taking up the conductorship in 1835.

==== Weimar, Liszt; then Hanover ====
In 1848, the pianist and composer Franz Liszt took up residence in Weimar, where Goethe and Schiller had lived. Liszt was determined to re-establish the town's reputation as the Athens of Germany. There, he gathered a circle of young avant-garde disciples, vocally opposed to the conservatism of the Leipzig circle. Joachim was amongst the first of these. He served Liszt as concertmaster, and for several years enthusiastically embraced the new "psychological music," as he called it. In 1852 he moved to Hanover, at the same time dissociating himself from the musical ideals of the 'New German School' (Liszt, Richard Wagner, Hector Berlioz, and their followers, as defined by journalist Franz Brendel). "The worship of Wagner's music permeating musical taste in Weimar was to Joachim inordinate and unacceptable." Joachim's break with Liszt became final in August 1857, when he wrote to his former mentor: "I am completely out of sympathy with your music; it contradicts everything which from early youth I have taken as mental nourishment from the spirit of our great masters." Hanover "was then an independent kingdom, later to be absorbed in the German empire." King Georg of Hanover was totally blind and very fond of music; he paid Joachim a good salary and gave him considerable freedom. Joachim's duties in Hanover included playing the main violin part in opera performances and that or conducting state concerts. He had five summer months off, in which he made concert tours around Europe. In March 1853 he sent to Liszt a copy of the Overture to Hamlet he had recently composed.

=== The Schumanns, Brahms; Berlin ===
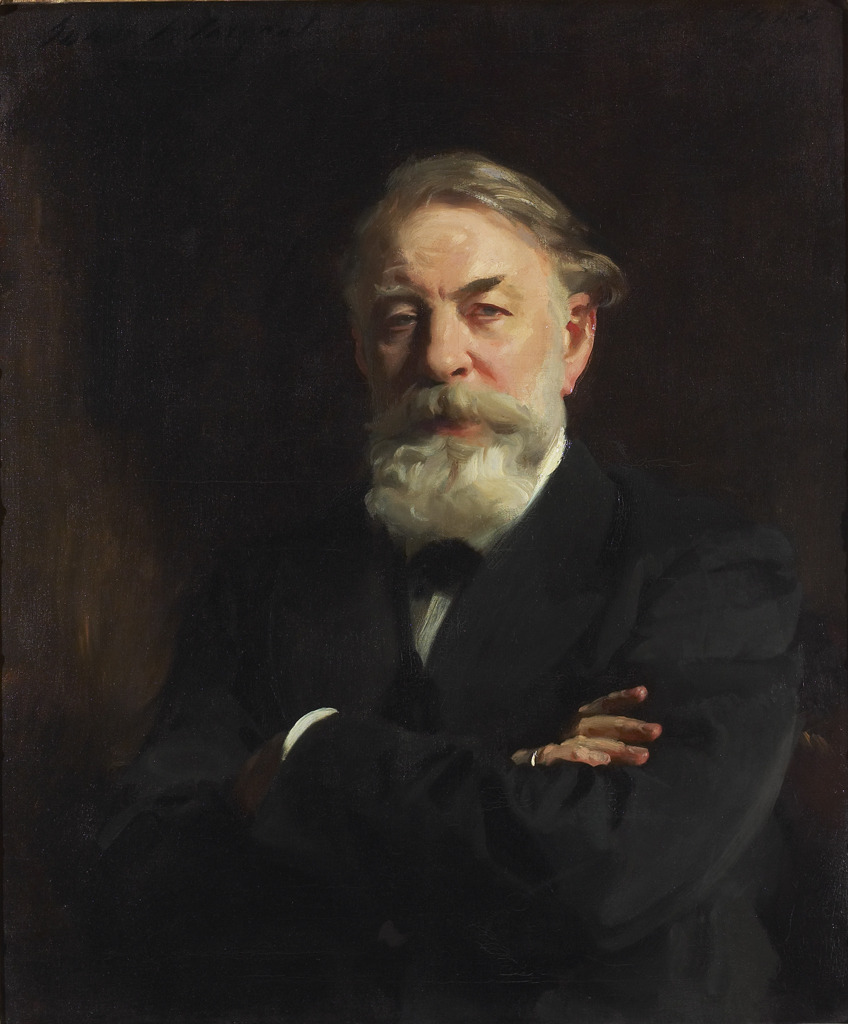
Joachim by John Singer Sargent, 1904

Also in 1853, a committee headed by Schumann invited Joachim to the Lower Rhine Music Festival. At the Festival, Joachim again soloed in the Beethoven violin concerto. His success made him, it is said, "the most renowned artist of Germany". Robert Schumann and his wife Clara were deeply impressed, and formed a "close connection" with Joachim. Joachim met the then publicly unknown 20-year-old Brahms, and wrote of him that his playing "shows the intense fire...which predicts the artist" and "his compositions already betoken such power as I have seen in no other musician of his age". Joachim strongly recommended Brahms to Robert. Brahms was received by the Schumanns with great enthusiasm. After Robert's mental breakdown in 1854 and death in 1856, Joachim, Clara, and Brahms remained lifelong friends and shared musical views. Joachim's performing style with the violin, like Clara's at the piano, is said to have been "restrained, pure, antivirtuosic, expressing the music rather than the performer."

In December 1854, Joachim visited Robert at the Endenich asylum where he had been since February, Joachim being his first visitor. Early on, Brahms already played and composed for the piano, which "he had mastered in a supreme fashion", but he felt deficient in orchestration. In 1854 he began composing what was to become his first piano concerto, his first orchestral piece. He sent a score of the first movement to Joachim, requesting his advice. After getting Joachim's response, Brahms wrote to him "A thousand thanks for having studied the first movement in such a sympathetic and careful manner. I have learned a great deal from your remarks. As a musician I really have no greater wish than to have more talent so that I can learn still more from such a friend." Later in the composition of the concerto, which took four years, Brahms wrote to Joachim "I am sending you the rondo once more. And just like the last time, I beg for some really severe criticism." The final manuscript of the concerto "shows many alterations in the handwriting of Joachim".

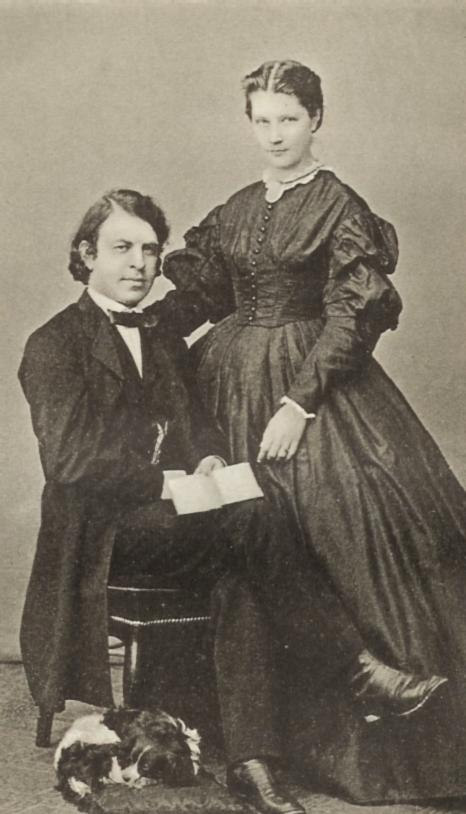
Joseph and Amalie Joachim

Joachim's time in Hanover was his most prolific period of composition. Then and during the rest of his career, he frequently performed with Clara Schumann. For example, in October–November 1857 they took a recital tour together to Dresden, Leipzig, and Munich. St. James's Hall, London, which opened in 1858, hosted a series of "Popular Concerts" of chamber music, of which programmes from 1867 through 1904 are preserved. Joachim appears a great many times. He visited London each year from 1866 on. In March 1898 and in 1901–1904 Joachim appeared in his own quartet of players, but otherwise far more often he appeared with resident Popular Concerts artists Louis Ries, second violin, J. B. Zerbini, first viola, and Alfredo Piatti, first cello, reputed to be "one of the most celebrated cellists" of the time. George Bernard Shaw wrote that the Popular Concerts had helped greatly to spread and enlighten musical taste in England. Joachim had been a mainstay of the chamber music Popular Concerts.

At 18 of the Popular Concerts at least, Clara Schumann performed along with Joachim, Zerbini and Piatti, presumably playing piano quartets (without second violin), or sometimes piano trios (for piano, violin, and cello). (The programs of those concerts very likely also included string quartets in which she of course did not play, as Ries is also listed.) A favorite piece of Clara's was Brahms's Piano Quartet in A major. She wrote to Brahms 27 February 1882 from London that the piece had received "much applause". About a performance of it in Liverpool 11 February she had written in her diary that it was "warmly received, much to my surprise as the public here is far less receptive than that in London." In January 1867 there had been a tour to Edinburgh and Glasgow, Scotland, by Joachim, Clara, her oldest daughter Marie, Ries, Zerbini, Piatti, two English sisters "Miss Pyne," one a singer, and a Mr. Saunders who managed all the arrangements. Marie Schumann wrote home from Manchester that in Edinburgh Clara "was received with tempestuous applause and had to give an encore, so had Joachim. Piatti, too, is always tremendously liked."

Joachim had extensive correspondence with both Clara and Brahms, as Brahms greatly valued Joachim's opinion of his new compositions. In 1860 Brahms and Joachim jointly wrote a manifesto against the "progressive" music of the 'New German' School, in reaction to the polemics of Brendel's Neue Zeitschrift für Musik. This manifesto, a volley in the War of the Romantics, had originally few (four) signers (more later) and met with a mixed reception, being heavily derided by followers of Wagner.

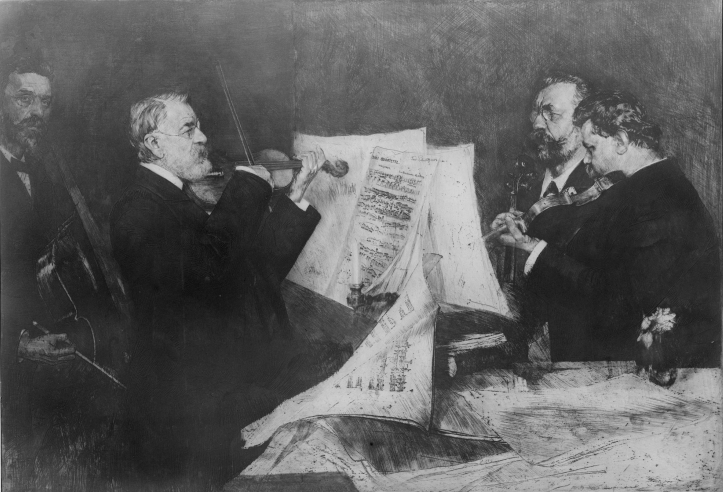
The famous Joachim Quartet. From left to right: Robert Hausmann (cello), Josef Joachim (1st violin), Emanuel Wirth (viola), and Karel Halíř (2nd violin).

On 10 May 1863 Joachim married the contralto Amalie Schneeweiss (stage name: Amalie Weiss) (1839–99). Amalie gave up her own promising career as an opera singer and gave birth to six children. She continued to perform in oratorios and to give lieder recitals. In 1865 Joachim quit the service of the King of Hanover in protest, when the Intendant (artistic director) of the Opera refused to advance one of the orchestral players (Jakob Grün) because of the latter's Jewish birth. In 1866, as a result of the Austro-Prussian War, in which Prussia and its capital Berlin became the dominant German state and city, Joachim moved to Berlin, where he was invited to help found, and to become the first director of, a new department of the Royal Academy of Music, concerned with musical performance and called the Hochschule für ausübende Tonkunst.

On Good Friday, 10 April 1868, Joachim and his wife joined their friend, Johannes Brahms, in the celebration of one of Brahms' greatest triumphs, the first complete performance of his German Requiem at the Bremen Cathedral. Amalie Joachim sang "I Know that My Redeemer Liveth" and Joseph Joachim played Robert Schumann's Abendlied. It was a glorious occasion, after which about 100 of the composer's friends, the Joachims, Clara Schumann, Albert Dietrich and his wife, Max Bruch, and others gathered at the Bremen Rathskeller.

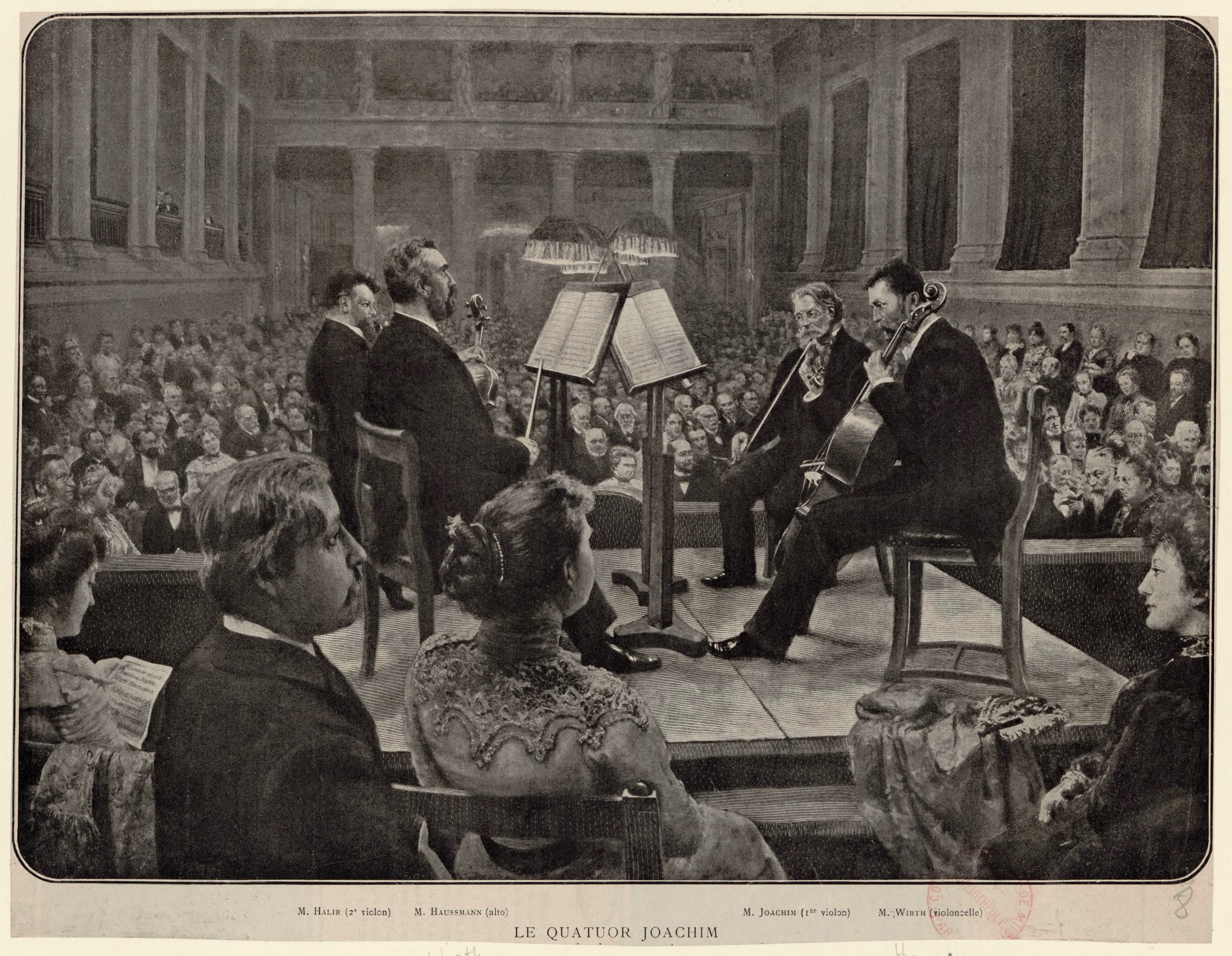
The Joachim Quartet performing in the Sing-Akademie zu Berlin—an engraving based on a painting (currently lost) by Felix Possart, published as a Beilage to the Zeitschrift der Internationalen Musikgesellschaft 4/5 (1903), between pp. 240 and 241.

In 1869, the Joachim String Quartet was formed, which quickly gained a reputation as Europe's finest. It continued to perform until Joachim's death in 1907. The first personnel of the quartet were: Ernst Schiever a pupil of Joachim, Heinrich de Ahna, and Wilhelm Muller. Schiever resigned after their second season with de Ahna taking the second violin part and Eduard Rappoldi on viola. Later members of the Quartet were Johann Kruse followed by Karel Halíř (2nd violin) from 1897 on; Emanuel Wirth (viola) from 1877 on (occasionally replaced by Karl Klingler); and Robert Hausmann (cello), from 1879 on.

In 1878 while writing his violin concerto, Brahms consulted Joachim, who "freely gave him encouragement and technical advice". Brahms asked Joachim to write the cadenza for the concerto, as he did.

In 1884, Joachim and his wife separated after he became convinced that she was having an affair with the publisher Fritz Simrock. Brahms, certain that Joachim's suspicions were groundless, wrote a sympathetic letter to Amalie, which she later produced as evidence in Joachim's divorce proceeding against her. This led to a cooling of Brahms' and Joachim's friendship, which was not restored until some years later, when Brahms composed the Double Concerto in A minor for violin and cello, Op. 102, 1887, as a peace offering to his old friend. It was co-dedicated to the first performers, Joachim and Robert Hausmann.

In late 1895 both Brahms and Joachim were present at the opening of the new Tonhalle at Zürich, Switzerland; Brahms conducted and Joachim was assistant conductor. But in April, two years later, Joachim was to lose forever this revered friend, as Johannes Brahms died at the age of 64 at Vienna. At Meiningen, in December 1899, it was Joachim who made the speech when a statue to Brahms was unveiled.

=== Honors and Jubilees ===
In March 1877, Joachim received an honorary Doctorate of Music from Cambridge University. For the occasion he presented his Overture in honor of Kleist, Op. 13. Near the 50th anniversary of Joachim's debut recital, he was honored by "friends and admirers in England" on 16 April 1889 who presented him with "an exceptionally fine" violin made in 1715 by Antonio Stradivari, called "Il Cremonese". About ten years later, for the sixtieth jubilee, a concert in honor of Joachim was given by his former students of violin and viola playing and cellists who had studied quartet playing with him, on 22 April 1899. The total of some 140 string players was impressive, as were their instruments (made by Stradivari, Guarneri, Bergonzi, Amati, etc.). An honor such as that concert "had been accorded to no other musician during his lifetime".

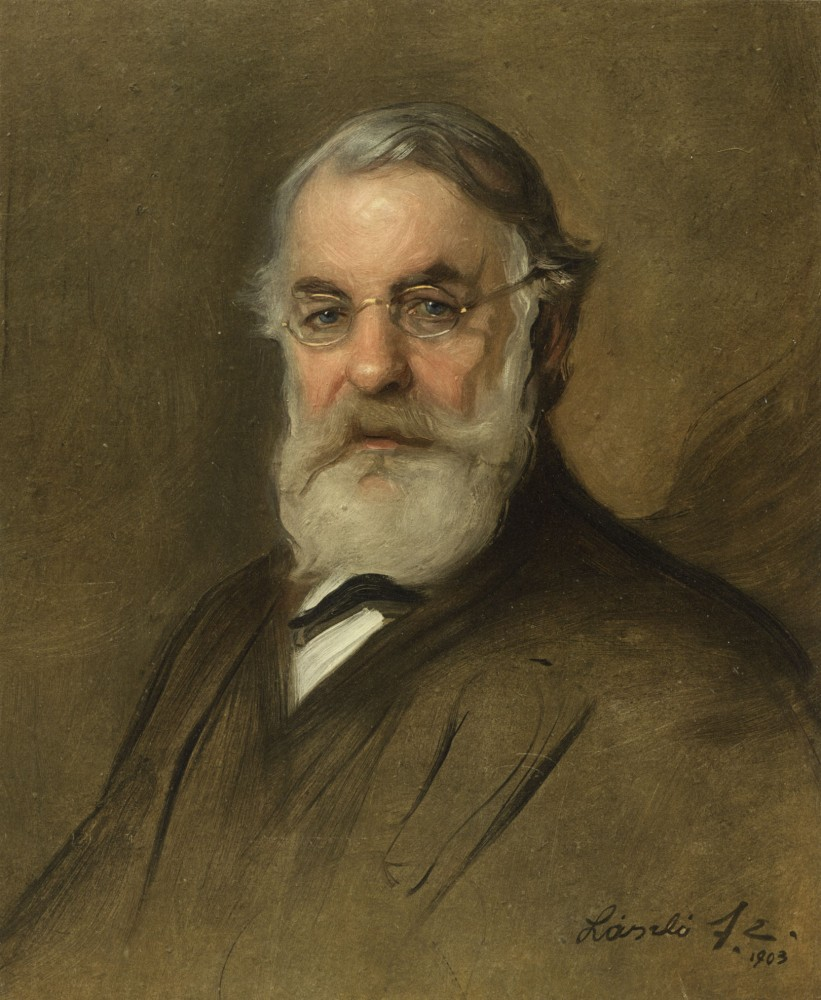
Joseph Joachim, by Philip Alexius de László, 1903

During 1899, Joachim was invited to become president of the newly established Oxford & Cambridge Musical Club in London. He remained club president until his death.

In Berlin, on 17 August 1903, Joachim recorded five sides for The Gramophone & Typewriter Ltd (G&T), which remain a fascinating and valuable source of information about 19th-century styles of violin playing. He is the earliest violinist of distinction known to have recorded, only to be followed soon thereafter when Sarasate made some recordings the following year.

Joachim's portrait was twice painted by Philip de László. A portrait of Joachim was painted by John Singer Sargent and presented to him at the 1904 "Diamond Jubilee" celebration of his sixtieth anniversary of his first appearance in London. Joachim remained in Berlin until his death in 1907.

At his 75th birthday observance in June 1906, Joachim said

The Germans have four violin concertos. The greatest, most uncompromising is Beethoven's. The one by Brahms vies with it in seriousness. The richest, the most seductive, was written by Max Bruch. But the most inward, the heart's jewel, is Mendelssohn's.

Bruch wrote three violin concertos. Joachim was presumably referring to his Concerto No. 1, which is the most well-known and frequently performed. Joachim had assisted Bruch in revising that concerto.

== Repertoire ==
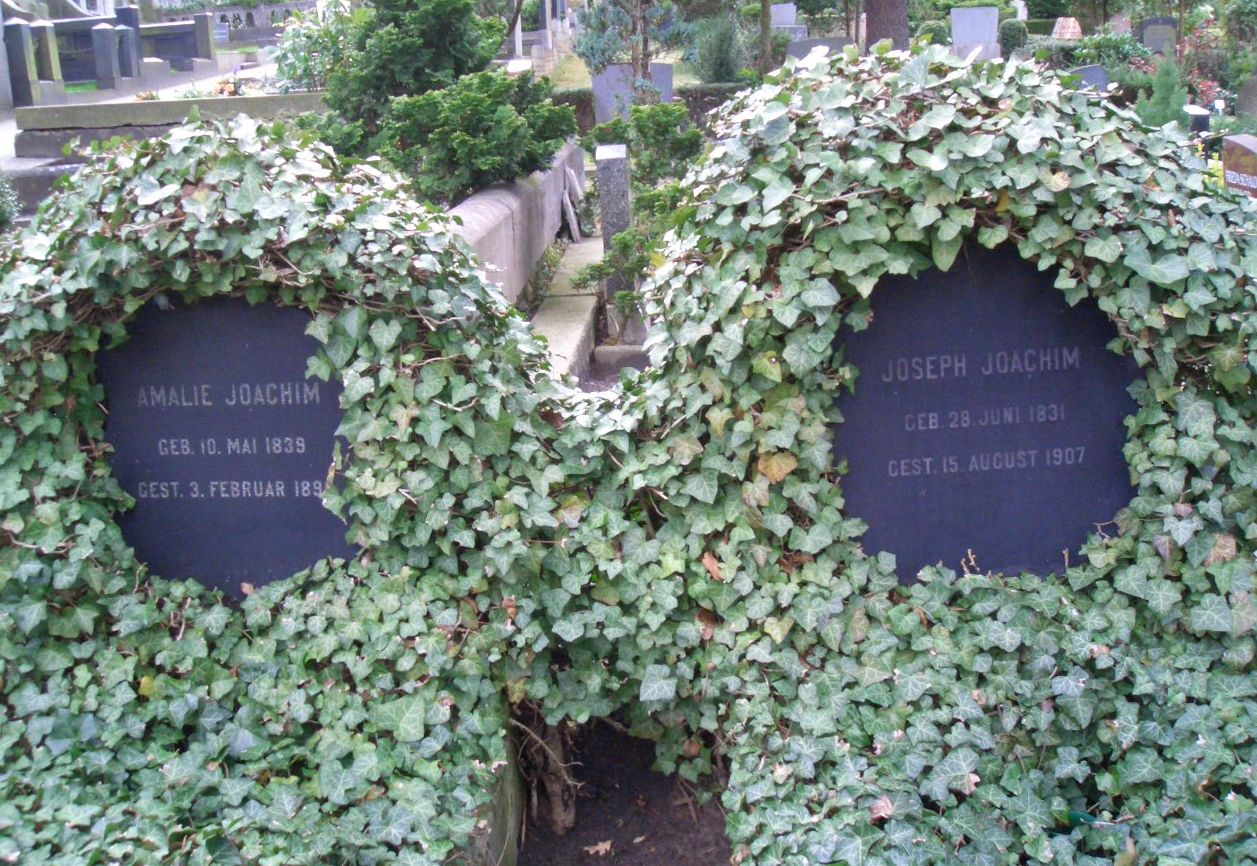
Amalie's and Joseph's grave in Berlin-Charlottenburg

Among the most notable of Joachim's achievements were his revival of Beethoven's violin concerto already mentioned, the revival of Bach's Sonatas and Partitas for solo violin, BWV 1001–1006, especially the Chaconne from the Partita No. 2, BWV 1004, and of Beethoven's late string quartets. Joachim was the second violinist, after Ferdinand David, to play Mendelssohn's Violin Concerto in E minor, which he studied with the composer. Joachim played a pivotal role in the career of Brahms, and remained a tireless advocate of Brahms's compositions through all the vicissitudes of their friendship. He conducted the English premiere of Brahms's Symphony No. 1 in C minor at Cambridge on 8 March 1877, on the same day that he received a D.Mus. degree there (Brahms had declined an invitation to go to England himself).

A number of Joachim's composer colleagues, including Schumann, Brahms, Bruch, and Dvořák, composed concerti with Joachim in mind, many of which entered the standard repertory. Nevertheless, Joachim's solo repertoire remained relatively restricted. He never performed Schumann's Violin Concerto in D minor, which Schumann wrote especially for him, or Dvořák's Violin Concerto in A minor, although Dvořák had earnestly solicited his advice about the piece, dedicated it to him, and would have liked him to premiere it. The most unusual work written for Joachim was the F-A-E Sonata, a collaboration between Schumann, Brahms, and Albert Dietrich, based upon the initials of Joachim's motto, Frei aber Einsam (which can be translated as "free but lonely", "free but alone", or "free but solitary"). Although the sonata is rarely performed in its entirety, the third movement, the Scherzo in C minor, composed by Brahms, is still frequently played today.

== Compositions ==
Joachim's own compositions are less well known. He gave opus numbers to 14 compositions and composed about an equal number of pieces without opus numbers. Among his compositions are various works for the violin (including three concerti) and overtures to Shakespeare's Hamlet and Henry IV. He also wrote cadenzas for a number of other composers' concerti (including the Beethoven and Brahms concerti). His most highly regarded composition is his Hungarian concerto (Violin Concerto No 2 in D minor, Op. 11).

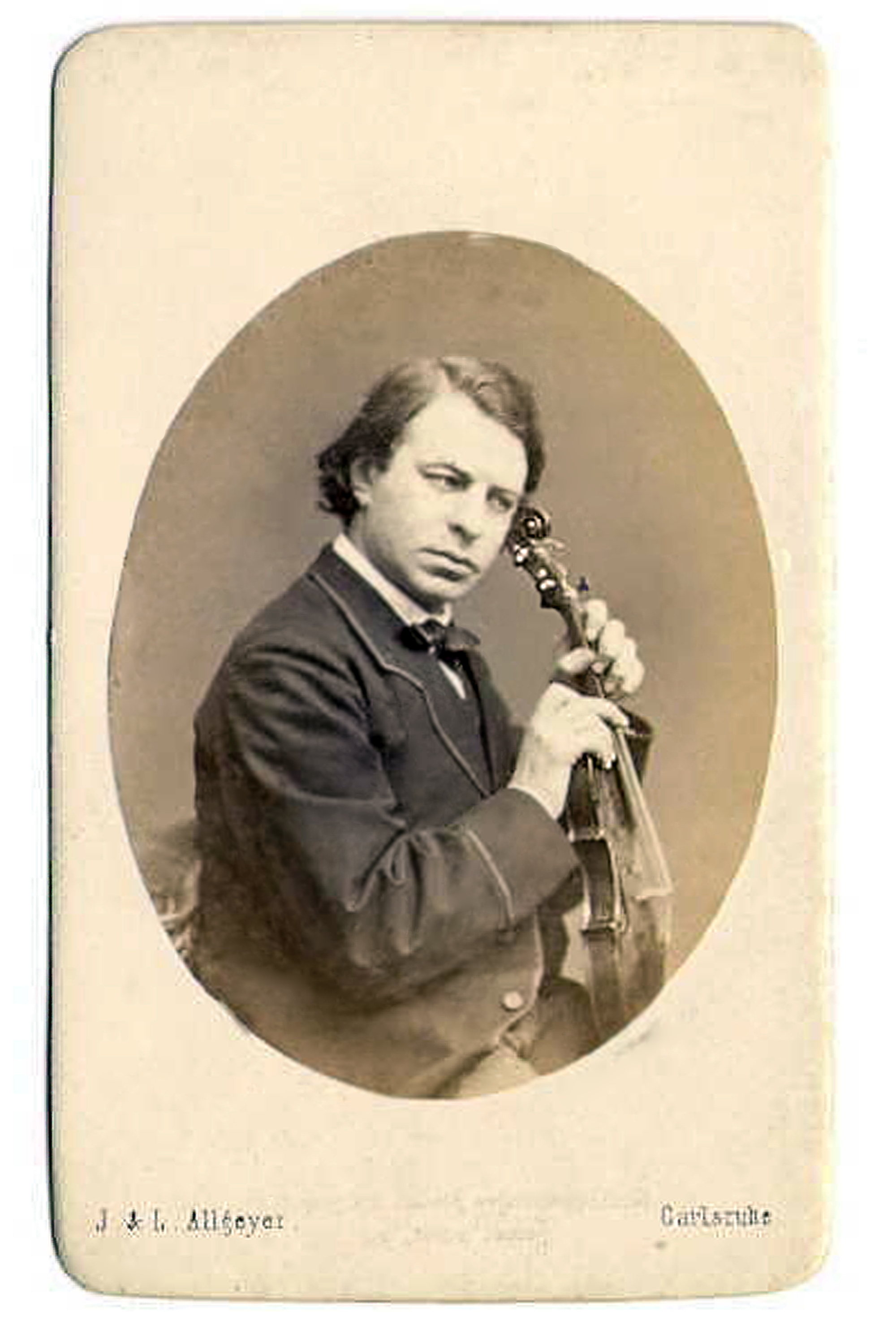
Joseph Joachim

=== List of compositions ===
Fuller-Maitland, p. 56, lists the 14 pieces with opus numbers, not necessarily with the same details as below. On p. 57 he lists 6 of the 14 pieces given here as WoO, plus the orchestration of the Schubert Grand Duo and the Beethoven and Brahms concerto cadenzas.

==== Original compositions ====
- Op. 1, Andantino and Allegro scherzoso, for violin and piano (1848): dedicated to Joseph Böhm
- Op. 2, Drei Stücke (3 Pieces) for violin or viola and piano, (circa 1848–1852): Romanze, Fantasiestück, Eine Frühlingsfantasie; dedicated to Moritz Hauptmann
- Op. 3, Violin Concerto in One Movement, in G minor (1851); dedicated to Franz Liszt
- Op. 4, Hamlet Overture (1853); dedicated to Kapelle of Weimar
- Op. 5, Three Pieces for Violin and Piano: Lindenrauschen, Abendglocken, Ballade; dedicated to Gisela von Arnim
- Op. 6, Demetrius Overture (1853, to a play by Herman Friedrich Grimm; overture dedicated to Franz Liszt)
- Op. 7, Henry IV Overture (1854)
- Op. 8, Overture to a Comedy by Gozzi (1854); dedicated to Fritz Steinbach.
- Op. 9, Hebräische Melodien, nach Eindrücken der Byron'schen Gesänge (Hebrew Melodies, after Impressions of Byron's Songs) for viola and piano (1854–1855)
- Op. 10, Variationen über ein eigenes Thema (Variations on an Original Theme) in E major for viola and piano (1854); dedicated to Hermann Grimm.
- Op. 11, Violin Concerto No. 2 in D minor "in the Hungarian Manner" (1857, published in 1861); dedicated to Johannes Brahms. It is said that the solo violin part of the Hungarian Concerto is very difficult to play.
- Op. 12, Notturno for Violin and Small Orchestra in A major (1858)
- WoO, Violin Concerto No. 3 in G major (1875)
- Op. 13, Elegiac Overture "In Memoriam Heinrich von Kleist" (ca. 1877)
- Op. 14, Szene der Marfa from Friedrich Schiller's unfinished drama Demetrius (ca. 1869)
- WoO Haidenröslein Lied for high voice and piano; pub. Verlag des Ungar, 1846.
- WoO, Ich hab' im Traum geweinet for voice and piano, pub. Wigand, 1854.
- WoO, Scene from Schiller's Demetrius (1878)
- WoO, Rain, rain and sun, Merlin's Song (Tennyson), pub. C. Kegan & Co., 1880.
- WoO, Melodrama zu einer Schillergedenkfeier (unpublished, autograph in Hamburg Staats- und Universitätsbibliothek)
- WoO, Overture in C major (Konzertouvertüre zum Geburtstag des Kaisers) (1896)
- WoO, Two Marches for orchestra, in C and D
- WoO, Andantino in A minor, for violin and orchestra (also for violin and piano)
- WoO, Romance in B-flat major, for violin and piano
- WoO, Romance in C major, for violin and piano; pub. C. F. Kahnt Nachfolge, Leipzig, 1894.
- WoO, String Quartet Movement in C minor
- WoO, Variationen über ein irisches Elfenlied for piano (first publ. by J. Schuberth & Co. Hamburg, 1989. Edited by Michael Struck.)
- WoO, Variations for Violin and Orchestra in E minor (ca. 1879); dedicated to Pablo Sarasate
- WoO, Fantasie über ungarische Motive (ca. 1850); premiered in Weimar under Franz Liszt in October 1850
- WoO, Fantasie über irische [schottische] Motive (ca. 1852); premiered in London in May 1852

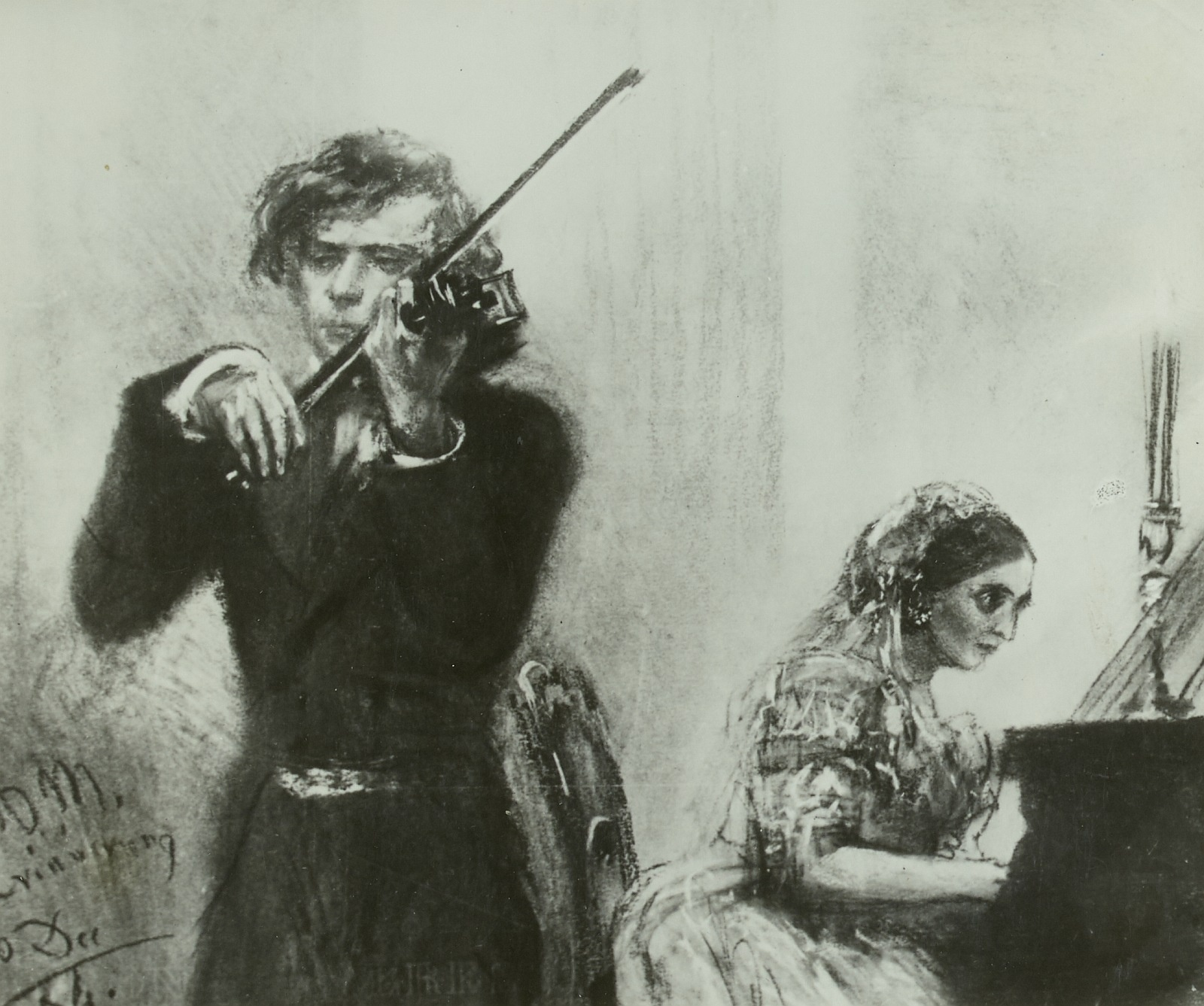
Joachim and Clara Schumann (1854), drawing by Adolph Menzel

==== An orchestration ====
- In 1855 Joachim orchestrated the Schubert Grand Duo piano duet into a "Symphony in C."

==== Cadenzas ====
- Beethoven, Concerto in D major, Op. 61
- Brahms, Concerto in D major, Op. 77
- Hiller, Concerto in A major, Op.152a
- Kreutzer, Concerto No. 19 in D minor
- Mozart, Aria from Il re pastore, K. 208, Concerto No. 3 in G major, K. 216, Concerto No. 4 in D major, K. 218, and Concerto No. 5 in A major, K. 219
- Rode, Concerto No. 10 in B minor, and Concerto No. 11 in D major
- Spohr, Concerto in A minor, Op. 47 (Gesangsszene)
- Tartini, Sonata in G minor (Devil's Trill)
- Viotti, Concerto No. 22 in A minor

=== Recordings of Joachim's compositions ===
Joachim at age 53

- Violin Concerto No. 1 in g minor, Op. 3
  - Suyoen Kim (Violin), Michael Halász (Conductor), Weimar Staatskapelle, Naxos: 8.570991
- Violin Concerto No. 2 in d minor, Op. 11 "In the Hungarian Style":
  - Rachel Barton Pine (Violin), Carlos Kalmar (Conductor), Chicago Symphony Orchestra, Cedille Records: CDR 90000 068 (liner notes)
  - Elmar Oliveira (Violin), Leon Botstein (Conductor), London Philharmonic Orchestra, IMP Masters #: MCD27
  - Aaron Rosand (Violin), Louis de Froment (Conductor), Luxembourg Radio/Television Symphony Orchestra, Vox #: CDX 5102
  - Aaron Rosand (Violin), Leo Driehuys (Conductor), Gelderland Symphony Orchestra (live, 22 May 1974), Rhine Classics #: RH-029
- Violin Concerto No. 3 in G major
  - Takako Nishizaki (Violin), Meir Minsky (Conductor), Stuttgart Radio Symphony Orchestra, Marco Polo #: 8.223373, Naxos #: 8.554733
- Hamlet Overture, Op. 4
  - Leon Botstein (Conductor), London Philharmonic Orchestra, IMP Masters #: MCD27
  - Mariss Jansons (Conductor), Oslo Philharmonic Orchestra, Simax #: PSC 1206
  - Meir Minsky (Conductor), Stuttgart Radio Symphony Orchestra, Naxos #: 8.554733
- Henry IV Overture, Op. 7
  - Leon Botstein (Conductor), London Philharmonic Orchestra, IMP Masters #: MCD27
- Elegische Ouvertüre, Op. 13
  - Meir Minsky (Conductor), Stuttgart Radio Symphony Orchestra, Naxos #: 8.554733
- Andantino and Allegro scherzoso, Op. 1: Andantino
  - Marat Bisengaliev (Violin), John Lenehan (Piano), Naxos #: 8.553026
- Drei Stücke für Violine und Pianoforte, Op. 2
  - Florin Paul (Violin), Birgitta Wollenweber (Piano), Tacet #: 56
- Drei Stücke für Violine und Pianoforte, Op. 5
  - Florin Paul (Violin), Birgitta Wollenweber (Piano), Tacet #: 56
- Notturno in A major, Op. 12
  - Hans Maile (Violin), Jesus Lopez-Cobos (Conductor), Berlin Radio Symphony Orchestra, Schwann #: CD 11622
- Romance in B-flat major
  - Marat Bisengaliev (Violin), John Lenehan (Piano), Naxos #: 8.553026
  - Aaron Rosand (Violin), Hugh Sung (Piano), Biddulph Recordings: LAW 003
- Romance in C major
  - Florin Paul (Violin), Birgitta Wollenweber (Piano), Tacet #: 56
- Hebrew melodies, Op. 9
  - Anna Barbara Dütschler (Viola), Marc Pantillon (Piano), Claves #: 9905
- Heinrich IV Overture, Op. 7 (2 pianos, arr. Johannes Brahms)
  - Duo Egri-Pertis, Hungaroton #: 32003
- Variations for Viola and Piano, Op. 10
  - Numerous recordings
- Variations for Violin and Orchestra in e minor
  - Vilmos Szabadi (Violin), László Kovács (Conductor), North Hungarian Symphony Orchestra, Hungaroton #: 32185
- Variations for Violin and Piano in e minor
  - Hagai Shaham (Violin), Arnon Erez (Piano), Hyperion #: CDA 67663
- String Quartet Movement (Quartettsatz) in c minor
  - Israel String Quartet, Classic Talent #: B001HADEWI
  - Joachim Quartet, Thorofon #: CTH 2120
- WoO, Fantasie über ungarische Motive; Fantasie über irische Motive
  - Katharina Uhde (Violin), Dennis Friesen-Carper (Conductor), Radio Orchestra Warsaw, Soundset #SR1122.

== Joachim's own discography ==
- J. S. Bach: Partita for Violin No. 1 in B minor, BWV 1002: 7th movement, Tempo di Bourrée, Pearl Catalog: 9851 (also on Testament (749677132323)).
- Brahms: Hungarian Dances (21) for Piano 4 hands, WoO 1: No. 1 in G minor (arr. Joachim), Opal Recordings (also on Testament (749677132323)).
- Brahms: Hungarian Dance No. 2 in D minor (arr. Joachim), Grammophon Catalogue #047905; HMV, D88.
- Joachim: Romance in C major, Op. 20, Pearl Catalog: 9851

Original pressings are single-sided and have a flat red G&T label. Later reeditions have a black G&T label (or, from 1909, from the 'His Master's Voice' record label), and those made for the German market are double-sided.

A letter preserved in the EMI archives records the stringent conditions Joachim expected for the publicity for his recordings: sensational adverts were to be avoided, with no comparisons between his art and that of other violinists. The letter also stated that "it was only with the greatest difficulty that Professor Joachim was induced to play".

== Joachim's students ==
Joachim and the young Franz von Vecsey. Note the strongly incurving, arthritic first finger of his left hand. The chair in which he is sitting was a special present to him. He willed it to Donald Tovey, and it is now owned by the University of Edinburgh Museum.

- Leopold Auer, violinist and teacher; studied with Joachim in Hanover. Among his many outstanding students were Mischa Elman, Jascha Heifetz, and Nathan Milstein.
- Dora Valesca Becker (1870–1958)
- Henri Berény (1871–1932), composer and violinist
- Hugo Leichtentritt
- Aylmer Buesst
- Willy Burmester
- Carl Courvoisier (1846–1908), author of Technics of Violin Playing on Joachim's Method, London: The Strad Library, No. I, 1894.
- Bram Eldering (1865–1943), Concertmaster of the Berlin Philharmonic under Hans von Bülow; Concertmaster of the Meininger Hofkapelle
- Adila Fachiri, Joachim's great-niece
- F. Fleischhauer (born 1834), Hofconcertmeister in Meiningen
- Sam Franko
- Richard Gompertz (born 1859), professor of violin at the Royal College of Music, London
- Jakob Grün, born in Pest, 1837; Joachim resigned a position to protest his non-advancement for being Jewish.
- Karel (Carl) Halíř (1859–1909), Bohemian violinist, member of the Joachim Quartet
- Willy Hess
- Gustav Hille
- Richard Himmelstoß (born 1843), Concertmaster in Breslau
- Theodore Holland (1878–1947), British composer and teacher.
- Gustav Holländer (born 1855), solo violinist
- Rebecca Wilder Holmes (1871–1953), American violinist and music professor at Smith College
- Jenő Hubay, Hungarian violinist, composer
- Bronisław Huberman
- Karl Klingler, violinist of the Klingler Quartet and Joachim's successor at the Berlin Hochschule; Klingler was the teacher of Shinichi Suzuki.
- Iosif Kotek (1855–1885), Russian violinist
- Hans Letz, Concertmaster of the Theodore Thomas Orchestra
- Bernhard Listemann, Concertmaster of the Boston Symphony Orchestra.
- Karl Markees (1865–1926), a Swiss violinist who at one point owned the Markees Stradivarius.
- Charles Martin Loeffler (1861–1935)
- Martin Marsick
- Pietro Melani
- Waldemar J. Meyer (1853–1940)
- Bernardo V. Moreira de Sá (1853–1924), Portuguese violinist and teacher; director of the "Conservatório de Música do Porto"; director and founder of the "Orpheon Portuense"; studied with Joachim in Berlin
- Andreas Moser (1859–1925), violinist and assistant to Joachim; Moser wrote the first biography of Joachim, Moser (1901), on Joachim's life up through 1899. He helped recover original scores of J.S. Bach's Sonate e Partite per violino solo, and collaborated with Joachim on numerous editions.
- Tivadar Nachéz (1859–1930)
- Johannes Palaschko (1877–1932)
- Henri Petri, Concertmaster in Leipzig
- Lili Petschnikoff (1874–1957), American violinist
- Maximilian Pilzer, Concertmaster of the New York Philharmonic (1915–1917),
- Enrico Polo (1868–1953), Italian violinist, violist, pedagogue
- Maud Powell, American violinist
- Willibald Richter (1860–1929), German-born English pianist, organist and teacher; student, friend and accompanist of Joachim; student of Haupt, Lebert, Liszt, Mischalek and Oscar; founded College of Music at Leicester
- Camillo Ritter, teacher of leading violist William Primrose
- Ernst Schiever (1844–1915), Leader of the Richter Orchestra, member of the original Joachim Quartet (1869–1871)
- Ossip Schnirlin (? – 1937)
- Emily Shinner
- Axel Skovgaard
- Maria Soldat-Röger
- Theodore Spiering, American violinist; born in St. Louis, lived in Chicago; Concertmaster (1909–1911) of New York Philharmonic
- Kemp Stillings (1888–1967), American violinist, music teacher
- Agnes Tschetschulin
- Franz von Vecsey, studied with Hubay, then Joachim; dedicatee of the Sibelius violin concerto
- Franz Wilczek
- Alfred Wittenberg

Other pupils may be mentioned by Wilhelm Joseph von Wasielewski in his "Die Violine und Ihre Meister". • Karl Scheurer

== Joachim's instruments ==
Most, but not all, of the many violins (and two violas) Joachim is said to have had during his career are shown on the website of Tarisio Auctions, cozio.com. Further information, in German, is in the article by Kamlah (2013).

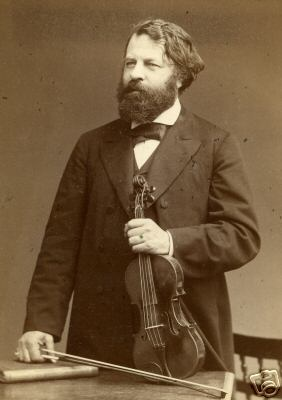
Joseph Joachim

- His first (full-size) violin was a Guarneri Filius Andreae 1703, which he gave to Felix Schumann after he acquired his first Stradivarius.
- A violin, the ex-Joachim Stradivarius of 1715 is currently held by the Collezione Civica del Comune di Cremona. It was presented to Joachim on the occasion of his Jubilee celebration in 1889.
- The Ex Joachim, Joseph Vieland Viola by Gasparo da Salò, Brescia, before 1609 is held by the Shrine to Music No. 3368.
- A 1678 'Joachim' Nicolo Amati violin (in 1988, reassessed by Bein & Fushi, as Francesco Rugeri)
- A Johannes Theodorus Cuypers anno 1807 was bought by Joachim in the mid 19th century and taken on tour throughout Europe. There is also evidence that the instrument was played by Joachim in a recital in Paris a half century later, in 1895. The same instrument was also played by Fritz Kreisler in a 1955 Carnegie Hall concert.

== Cultural references ==
The English poet Robert Bridges wrote a sonnet about Joachim in his first major work of poetry The Growth of Love. A monument to Joachim, sculpted by Adolf von Hildebrand, was installed in the Great hall of the Royal Academy of Music.

== Sources ==
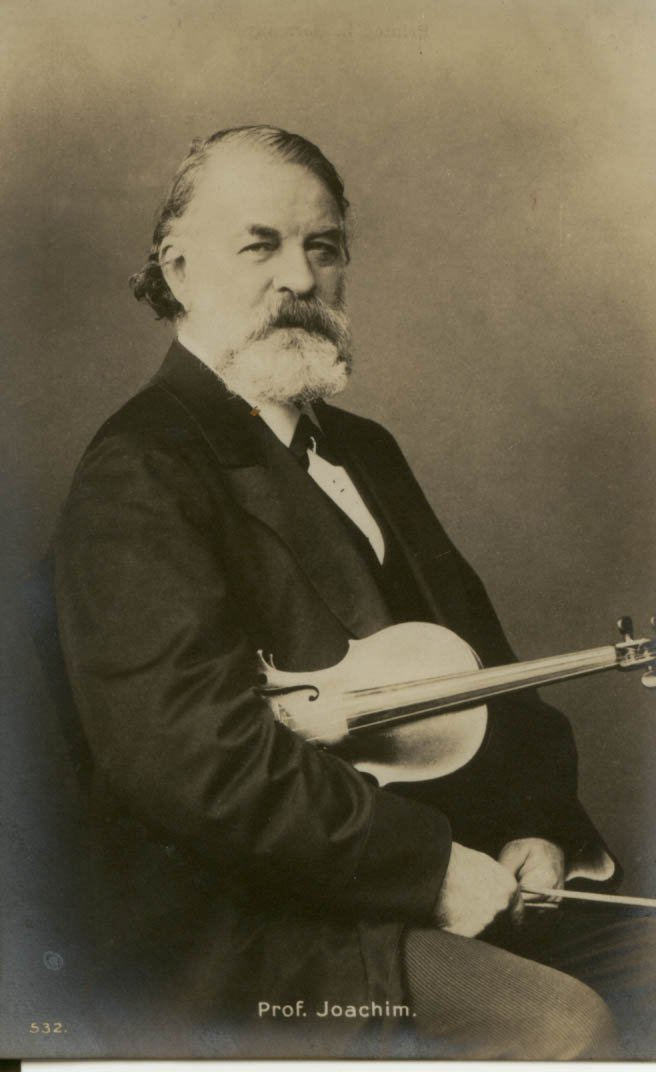
Joseph Joachim

- Leopold Auer, 1923, My long Life in Music, F. A. Stokes, New York
- On The Trail of a Russian Nobleman by Gennady Filimonov The Strad magazine June 2023 p. 20-p. 25
- Styra Avins, "Joachim, Joseph", in The Oxford Companion to Music, ed. Alison Latham, Oxford University Press, 2002, pp. 637–638, ISBN 978-0-19-866212-9
- Ute Bär, "Sie wissen ja, wie gerne ich, selbst öffentlich, mit Ihnen musicire! Clara Schumann und Joseph Joachim", Die Tonkunst, vol. 1, nr. 3, July 2007, 247–257.
- Otto Biba, "'Ihr Sie hochachtender, dankbarer Schüler Peppi', Joseph Joachims Jugend im Spiegel bislang unveröffentlicher Briefe", Die Tonkunst, vol. 1, nr. 3, July 2007, 200–204.
- Nora Bickley, selector and translator, Letters From and To Joseph Joachim, with a preface by J. A. Fuller-Maitland, New York: Vienna House, 1972.
- Beatrix Borchard, Stimme und Geige: Amalie und Joseph Joachim, Biographie und Interpretationsgeschichte, Wien, Köln, Weimar, Böhlau Verlag, 2005.
- Beatrix Borchard, "Groß-männlich-deutsch? Zur Rolle Joseph Joachims für das deutsche Musikleben in der Wilhelminischen Zeit", Die Tonkunst, vol. 1, nr. 3, July 2007, 218–231.
- Siegfried Borris, "Joseph Joachim zum 65. Todestag", Oesterreichische Musikzeitschrift XXVII (June 1972): 352–355.
- Margaret Campbell, 1981, The Great Violinists, Doubleday, Garden City, New York. (Has a chapter on Joachim)
- F. G. E., "Joseph Joachim", The Musical Times, 48/775 (1 September 1907): 577–583.
- Robert W. Eshbach, "Der Geigerkönig: Joseph Joachim as Performer", Die Tonkunst, vol. 1, nr. 3, July 2007, 205–217.
- Robert W. Eshbach, "Verehrter Freund! Liebes Kind! Liebster Jo! Mein einzig Licht. Intimate letters in Brahms's Freundeskreis", Die Tonkunst, vol. 2, nr. 2, April 2008, 178–193
- Robert W. Eshbach, "Joachims Jugend", Die Tonkunst, vol. 5, nr. 2, April 2011, 176–190.
- Robert W. Eshbach, "Joachim's Youth – Joachim's Jewishness", The Musical Quarterly, vol. 94, no. 4, Winter 2011, 548–592
- J. A. Fuller-Maitland, Joseph Joachim, London & New York: John Lane, 1905, a Google Books; repr. Bibliobazaar, 2010, public domain
- Johannes Joachim and Andreas Moser (eds.), Briefe von und an Joseph Joachim, 3 vols., Berlin: Julius Bard, 1911–1913
- Hans Gál, Johannes Brahms: His Work and Personality, transl. from German by Joseph Stein, Knopf, New York, 1971.
- Ruprecht Kamlah, Joseph Joachims Guarneri-Geigen, Eine Untersuchung im Hinblick auf die Familie Wittgenstein, Wiener Geschichtsblätter 2013, Vol. 1, p. 33, posted on "Joseph Joachim: Biography and Research", 2015.
- Ruprecht Kamlah, "Joseph Joachims Geigen, Ihre Geschichten und Spieler, besonders der Sammler Wilhelm Kux, Palm und Enke, Erlangen 2018, ISBN 978-3-7896-1023-3, 230 pages.
- Adolph Kohut, Josef Joachim. Ein Lebens- und Künstlerbild. Festschrift zu seinem 60. Geburtstage, am 28. Juni 1891, Berlin: A. Glas, 1891.
- Berthold Litzmann, 1913, Clara Schumann: An Artist's Life based on material found in Diaries and Letters, Translated from the fourth German edition by Grace E. Hadow, MacMillan, London.
- Brigitte Massin, Les Joachim: Une Famille de Musiciens, Paris: Fayard, 1999. ISBN 2-213-60418-5
- Andreas Moser (ed.), Johannes Brahms im Briefwechsel mit Joseph Joachim, 2nd ed., Berlin: Deutsche Brahms-Gesellschaft, 1912.
- Andreas Moser, Joseph Joachim: Ein Lebensbild, 2 vols. Berlin: Verlag der Deutschen Brahms-Gesellschaft, vol. 1: 1908; vol. 2: 1910. (Published after the following translation, so must be a revised edition?)
- Andreas Moser, Joseph Joachim: A Biography (1831–1899), translated by Lilla Durham, introduction by J. A. Fuller-Maitland, London: Philip Wellby, 1901. (Published during Joachim's lifetime)
- Hans Joachim Moser, Joseph Joachim, Sechsundneunzigstes Neujahrsblatt der Allgemeinen Musikgesellschaft in Zürich, Zürich & Leipzig: Hug & Co., 1908
- Anne Russell, "Joachim", The Etude, (December 1932) 884–885.
- Dietmar Schenk, "Aus einer Gründerzeit: Joseph Joachim, die Berliner Hochschule für Musik und der deutsch-französische Krieg", Die Tonkunst, vol. 1, nr. 3, July 2007, 232–246.
- Michael Steinberg, The Concerto: A Listener's Guide, Oxford University Press, 1998, ISBN 0-19-510330-0
- Barrett Stoll, Joseph Joachim: Violinist, Pedagogue, and Composer, Ph.D. Diss., Univ. of Iowa, 1978.
- Karl Storck, Joseph Joachim: Eine Studie, Leipzig: Hermann Seemann Nachfolger, n.d.
- Robert Stowell, Ed., Cambridge Companion to the String Quartet, Cambridge University Press, 2003.
- Jan Swafford, Johannes Brahms: A Biography, Knopf and Vintage Books, 1997.
- Katharina Uhde, "Rediscovering Joseph Joachim's 'Hungarian' and 'Irish' ['Scottish'] fantasias.", In: The Musical Times, 158/1941 (Winter 2017): 75–99.
- Katharina Uhde, The Music of Joseph Joachim, Boydell & Brewer, 2018.
- Katharina Uhde, ed., Joseph Joachim, Fantasy on Hungarian Themes (1850), Fantasy on Irish [Scottish] Themes (1852) for Violin and Orchestra, Bärenreiter, 2018.
- Katharina Uhde, "An Unknown Beethoven Cadenza by Joseph Joachim: 'Dublin 1852'", The Musical Quarterly, Vol. 103, Issue 3–4 (Fall-Winter 2020): 394–424.
- Gerhard Winkler (ed.) "Geigen-Spiel-Kunst: Joseph Joachim und der 'Wahre' Fortschritt", Burgenländische Heimatblätter, vol. 69, nr. 2, 2007.
- Klaus Martin Kopitz (ed.), Briefwechsel Robert und Clara Schumanns mit Joseph Joachim und seiner Familie, 2 vols. (= Schumann-Briefedition, series II, vol. 2), Köln: Dohr, 2019, ISBN 978-3-86846-013-1
