= Michael Halász =

German-Hungarian classical conductor (born 1938)

Michael Halász (born 21 May 1938 in Cluj) is a German-Hungarian classical conductor.

Halász began his musical career as principal bassoonist with the Philharmonia Hungarica in Vienna. After eight years in that position, he studied conducting at the Folkwang Schule in Essen, Germany. His first engagement as conductor was at the Munich Staatstheater am Gärtnerplatz, from 1972 to 1975, where he conducted operetta productions.

In 1975, Halász moved to Frankfurt and worked as principal Kapellmeister under Christoph von Dohnányi. During this time, he conducted a number of major operas. In 1977, when Dohnányi moved to Hamburg, Halász went with him, continuing his work as principal Kapellmeister at the Hamburg State Opera. In 1978, Halász was appointed General Musical Director of the Hagen Philharmonic Orchestra, and in 1991 he was named Resident Conductor at the Vienna State Opera. His contract there ended in 2011. Since 2011 he conducted every year at least one CD in Pardubice with the Czech Chamber Philharmonic Orchestra for Naxos.

Halász has made dozens of recordings for the Naxos and Marco Polo labels, ranging from the complete symphonies of Beethoven and Liszt's Symphonic poems to works by Mozart, Pergolesi, Dvorak, Mahler, Schubert and many others. He has also recorded several of Mozart's operas, notably Don Giovanni, The Magic Flute, and The Marriage of Figaro.
