= Ahna =

Ahna is a feminine given name. Notable people with the name include:

- Ahna Capri (1944–2010), Hungarian-American actress
- Ahna Girshick, American artist, computer scientist and neuroscientist
- Ahna O'Reilly (born 1984), American actress
- Ahna Skop (born 1972), American geneticist and artist

== See also ==
- de Ahna
- Ana (given name)
