= De Ahna =

de Ahna, DeAhna or Deahna is a surname. Notable people with the surname include:

- Eleonore de Ahna (1838–1865), German operatic singer
- Feodor Deahna (1815–1844), German mathematician
- Heinrich de Ahna (1832–1892), Austrian violinist
- Henry Charles DeAhna (1823–1891), Commander of the Department of Alaska
- Pauline de Ahna (1863–1950), German operatic singer, and the wife of composer Richard Strauss
