= Cello Sonata No. 2 (Brahms) =

1886 composition by Johannes Brahms

Cello Sonata in F major
- No. 2
- by Johannes Brahms
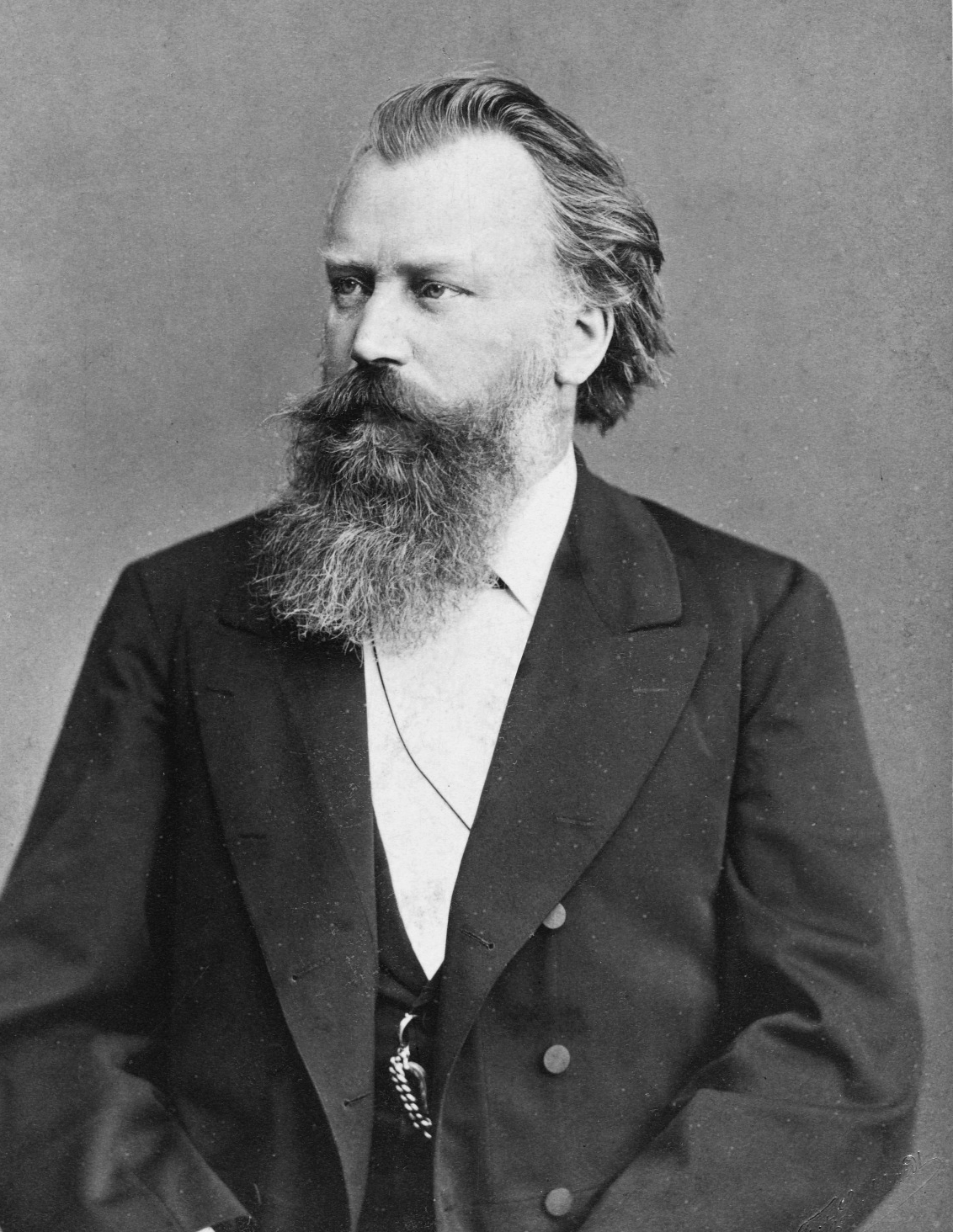
- The composer c. 1885
- Native name: Sonate für Klavier und Violoncello
- Key: F major
- Opus: 99
- Composed: 1886
- Dedication: Robert Hausmann
- Published: 1887
- Movements: four

Johannes Brahms's Cello Sonata No. 2 in F major, Op. 99 (1886) followed his first by over twenty years and was published in 1887. It was written for, dedicated to, and premiered by Robert Hausmann, who had championed the earlier sonata and later premiered the Double Concerto with Joseph Joachim.

== Musical description ==
There are four movements:

1. Allegro vivace
2. Adagio affettuoso in F♯ major
3. Allegro passionato in F minor
4. Allegro molto

=== I. Allegro vivace ===
The Allegro vivace is a sonata form opening with a fragmented cello theme over a tremolo piano part. Its bipartite exposition somewhat unusually traverses F major, C major, and A minor; Roger Graybill argued that the tonal plan may be read as ultimately returning to F major, given the intricate motivic structure of its voice leading.

=== II. Adagio affettuoso ===
Adagio affettuoso, with the cello part opening in a pizzicato exposition of the main theme over piano chords. The central section is in F minor.

=== III. Allegro passionato ===
Allegro passionato in F minor, with a more songlike trio section in F major.

=== IV. Allegro molto ===
Allegro molto; a rondo.

== Notes ==
=== Bibliography ===
- Graybill, Roger. 1988. "Harmonic Circularity in Brahms's F Major Cello Sonata: An Alternative to Schenker's Reading in Free Composition". Music Theory Spectrum 10(1):43–55. doi:10.1525/mts.1988.10.1.02a00040.
