= Ahna Girshick =

Multidisciplinary artist and neuroscientist

Ahna Girshick is a multidisciplinary artist, computer scientist and neuroscientist. Girshick's career combines her background in computational neuroscience and computer science with her artistic practice, creating works that explore the nature of artificial and human perception.

== Early life and education ==
Girshick earned her Ph.D. in Vision Science from the University of California, Berkeley in 2007. Under the advisory of Prof. Marty Banks, her research focused on understanding visual processing in the brain. Her academic work contributed to advancements in computational neuroscience including her highly cited Nature Neuroscience paper written during her postdoctoral studies with Michael S. Landy and Eero Simoncelli at New York University, "Cardinal rules: visual orientation perception reflects knowledge of environmental statistics."

In 1992, as a student at South High School in Minneapolis, she interned at The Geometry Center under Tamara Munzner and participated in their Summer Institute with knot theorist John Horton Conway. Girshick earned undergraduate and graduate degrees in Computer Science from the University of Minnesota with an emphasis on computer graphics, AI and human-computer interaction. She studied under Victoria Interrante, with whom she developed an algorithm to render non-photorealistic pen-and-ink style line drawings in the style of the Old Masters. Later she worked on perceptual research and computer vision algorithms for self-driving cars at Nissan's (since closed) Cambridge Basic Research Lab which was embedded in MIT CSAIL.

Between her research areas in computer science, perceptual neuroscience, and later genetics, Ahna Girshick has published over 20 peer-reviewed publications, four U.S. patents.

== Career ==
After completing her post-doctoral training, Girshick applied her computer science and neuroscience skills to AI-assisted medical imaging as head of product at the medical startup Enlitic. She later managed machine learning product research at Ancestry DNA as a manager of Computational Genomics Research.

In the 2020s, Girshick turned her attention to the arts, where she uses technology to investigate themes of perception, reality, and artificial intelligence. Her artworks include digitally-generated imagery, interactive installations, and traditional paintings. By merging scientific principles with creative expression, Girshick's work invites audiences to question the nature of perception and the role of technology in shaping our understanding of the world.

== Personal life ==
Ahna Girshick is married to new media artist and author Scott Snibbe. She is the granddaughter of diplomat and information theorist Fazlollah Reza, and great-grand-niece of Stanford game theorist Meyer Girshick.
