= Kol Nidrei (Bruch) =

1880 musical composition by Max Bruch

- by Max Bruch
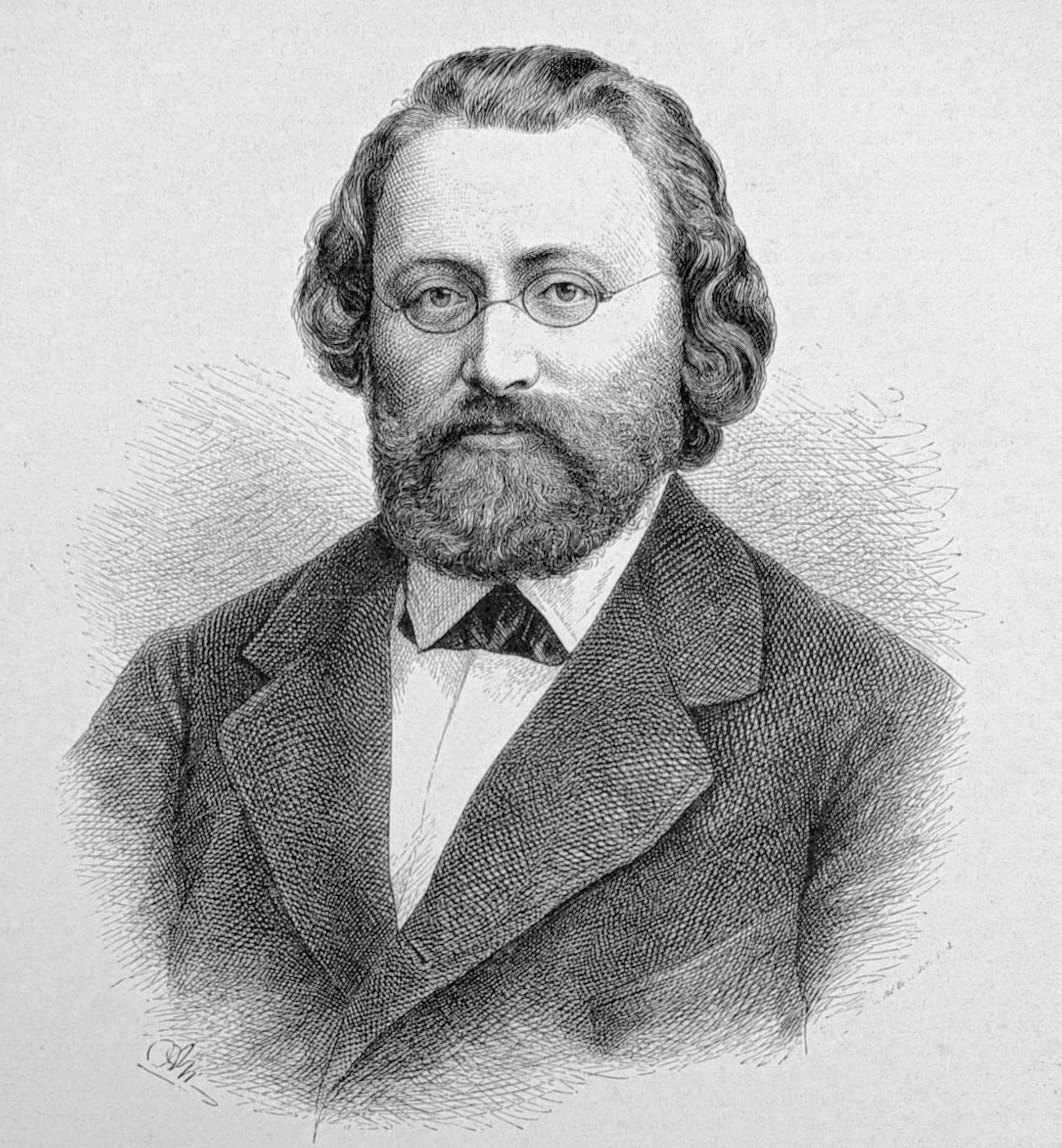
- Max Bruch, 1881
- Other name: All Vows
- Opus: 47
- Year: 1880
- Period: Classical music
- Genre: Romantic music
- Based on: Kol Nidre; Hebrew Melodies
- Published: 1881
- Scoring: Cello and Orchestra

Recording
- Performed by the chamber orchestra of the United States Marine Band, 2013: file; help

Kol Nidrei, Op. 47 (also known as All Vows, the meaning of the phrase in Aramaic), is a composition for cello and orchestra written by Max Bruch.

== History ==
Bruch completed the work in Liverpool, England, in 1880, and published it in Berlin in 1881. It was dedicated to and premiered by Robert Hausmann, who later co-premiered Johannes Brahms's Double Concerto with Joseph Joachim, the dedicatee of Bruch's most famous work, the Violin Concerto No. 1 in G minor. Hausmann had requested such a cello work from Bruch.

The use of Jewish folk music as an inspiration has been seen by some academics as a reflection of the extent of Jewish assimilation into Germany. Many also mistakenly believed that Bruch was Jewish as a result of this piece, despite the composer actively working to correct that mistake in his own lifetime.

After his Violin Concerto No. 1, the Kol Nidrei is Bruch's second most frequently performed piece.

== Development ==
It is styled as an Adagio on 2 Hebrew Melodies for Cello and Orchestra with Harp and consists of a series of variations on two main themes of Jewish origin. The first theme, which also lends the piece its title, comes from the Kol Nidre declaration, which is recited during the evening service on Yom Kippur. In Bruch's setting of the melody, the cello imitates the rhapsodic voice of the cantor who chants the liturgy in the synagogue. The second subject of the piece is quoted from the middle section of Isaac Nathan's arrangement of "O Weep for Those that Wept on Babel's Stream", a lyric which was penned by Lord Byron in his collection Hebrew Melodies (which also includes the famous poem "She Walks in Beauty").

Bruch was a Protestant and first became acquainted with the Kol Nidrei melody when his teacher Ferdinand Hiller introduced him to the Lichtenstein family, the head of which served as the cantor-in-chief of Berlin. Cantor Abraham Jacob Lichtenstein was known to have cordial relations with many Christian musicians and supported Bruch's interest in Jewish folk music. While some commentators, including Abraham Zevi Idelsohn, have criticized the lack of Jewish sentiment in Bruch's concert-hall Kol Nidrei, Bruch never presumed to write Jewish music. He only wished to incorporate Jewish inspirations into his own compositions.

Even though I am a Protestant, as an artist I deeply felt the outstanding beauty of these melodies and therefore I gladly spread them through my arrangement. [Quoted from a letter written by Bruch.]

In his presentation, the melody entirely lost its original character. Bruch displayed a fine art, masterly technique and fantasy, but not Jewish sentiments. It is not a Jewish Kol-Nidre which Bruch composed. [Quoted from Idelsohn, Jewish Music in its Historic Development, 1929.]

The work is scored for solo cello, 2 flutes, 2 oboes, 2 clarinets, 2 bassoons, 4 horns, 2 trumpets, 3 trombones, timpani, harp and strings.

== Arrangements ==
An arrangement by Bruch with the orchestra replaced by piano was published by Simrock; other arrangements have included a version for double bass and piano by Serge Koussevitzky.
