= Phillip Roth =

Phillip Roth may refer to:

- Phil Roth (1930–2002), American television and film actor
- Philip Roth (1933–2018), American novelist
- Philipp Roth (1853–1898), German cellist
- Phillip J. Roth (born 1959), American producer, director and screenwriter
