= Kol Nidre =

Recitation that precedes Yom Kippur service

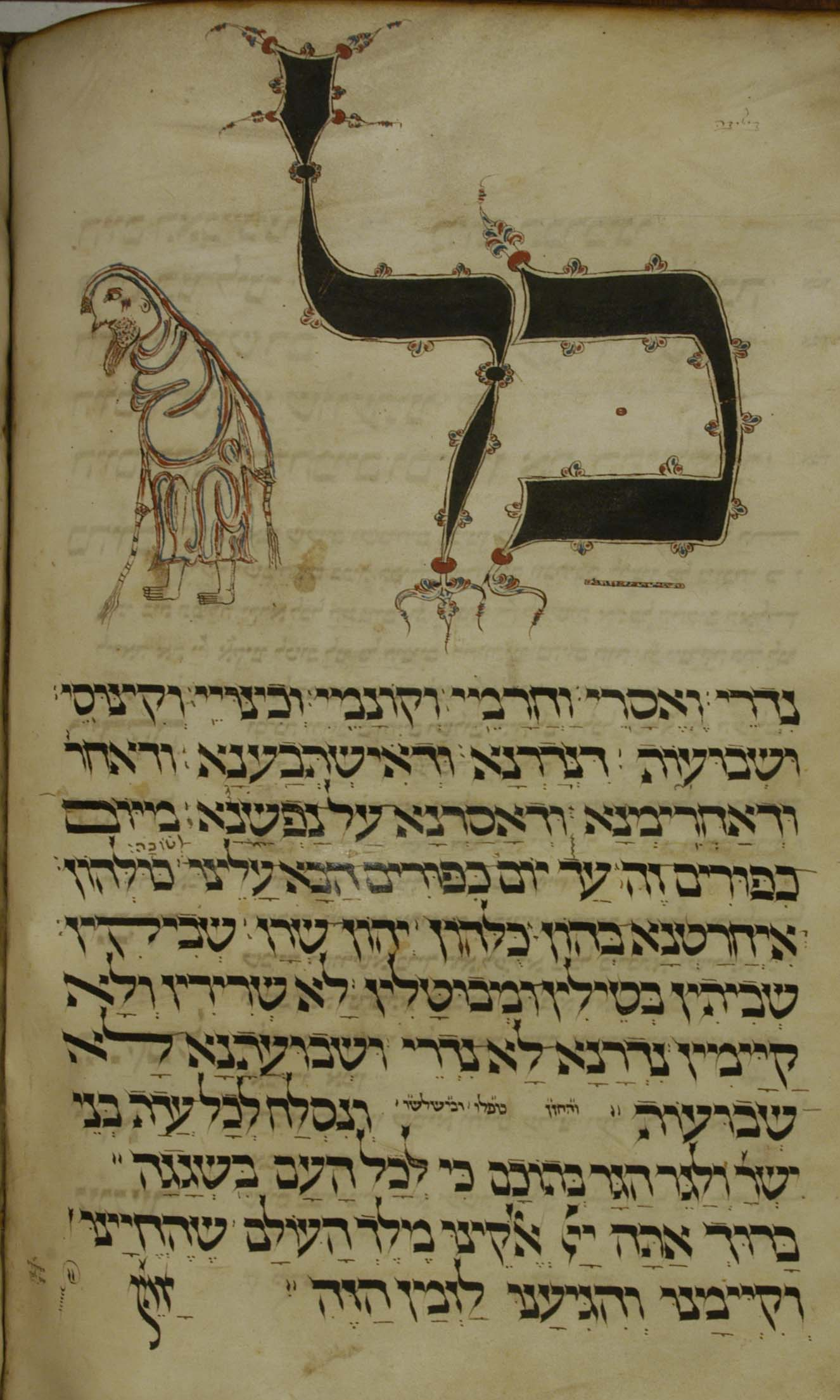
Kol nidre in an illuminated machzor from Worms (c. 1280). MS Kaufmann A 388 (f. 54v), copied by Eliezer ben Elijah haLevi Shevet-Sofer.

Kol Nidre /ˈkɔːl nɪˈdreɪ/ (also known as Kol Nidrei or Kol Nidrey; Aramaic: כָּל נִדְרֵי kāl niḏrē) is an Aramaic declaration which begins Yom Kippur services in the synagogue. Strictly speaking, it is not a prayer, even though it is commonly spoken of as if it were a prayer. This declaration and its ceremonial accompaniment have been charged with emotional undertones since the medieval period, creating a dramatic introduction to Yom Kippur on what is often dubbed "Kol Nidrei night", with the entire Yom Kippur evening service popularly called Kol Nidrei.

The common text for Kol Nidrei is written mostly in Aramaic, with one Hebrew phrase. However, the earliest known text of Kol Nidrei ("Kol Nedarim"), as it appears in the Siddur of Rav Amram Gaon, is in Hebrew; this text is used with minor changes by Italian rite and Romaniote Jews. Its name is taken from its opening words, which mean "all vows". The formula, depending on rite, either proactively annuls any personal or religious oaths or prohibitions which are made between oneself and God in the course of the next year, so as to preemptively avoid the sin of breaking vows which are made to God but are not or cannot be upheld, or annuls any vows taken in the preceding year.

Kol Nidrei has had an eventful history, both in itself and in its influence on the legal status of the Jews. Introduced into the liturgy despite the opposition of rabbinic authorities, repeatedly attacked in the course of time by many halakhists, and in the nineteenth century expunged from the prayer-book by many communities of western Europe, it has often been employed by Christians to support their assertion that the oath of a Jew cannot be trusted.

== Form of the ritual ==
Kol Nidre chant from the 1950s

Before sunset on Yom Kippur eve, worshipers gather in the synagogue. The Ark is opened and in many communities some of the Sifrei Torah (Torah scrolls) are removed. A person stands on each side of the Hazzan (in some communities holding the Torah Scrolls), and the three (forming a beth din or rabbinical court) recite:

בישיבה של מעלה ובישיבה של מטה, על דעת המקום ועל דעת הקהל, אנו מתירין להתפלל עם העבריינין.

In the Heavenly Academy and in the earthly academy, by the authority of Hashem and by the authority of this congregation, we hold it lawful to pray with these sinners.

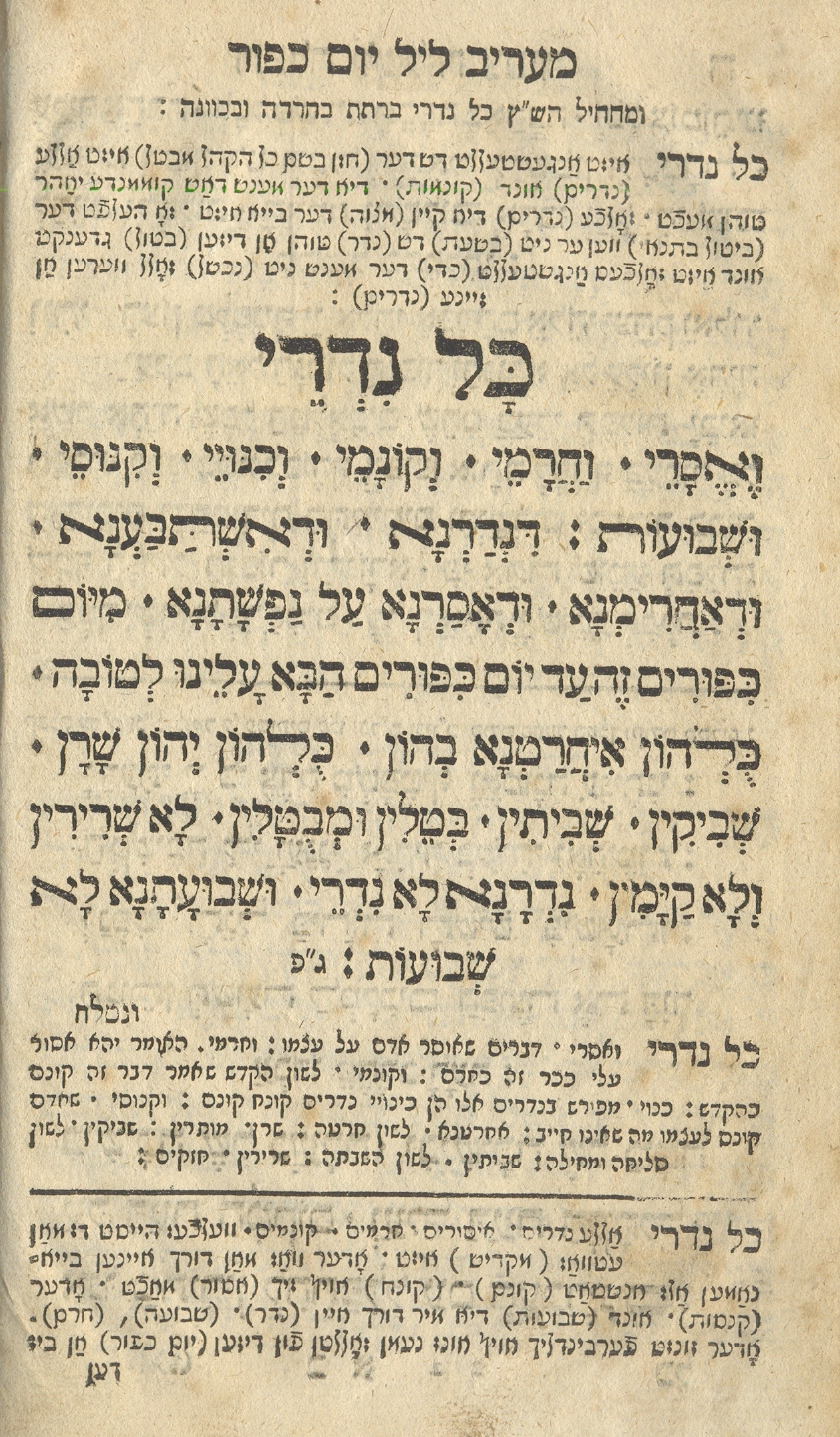
Kol Nidre from a 19th-century Western Ashkenazic machzor

This invitation to outcasts is not specifically for Kol Nidre but for the whole of Yom Kippur, it being obvious that when even sinners join in repenting, the occasion is worthy of Divine clemency.

The cantor then chants the passage beginning with the words Kol Nidre with its touching melodic phrases, and, in varying intensities from pianissimo (quiet) to fortissimo (loud), repeats twice (for a total of three iterations) lest a latecomer not hear them. In the Italian and Romaniote rites, it is recited in Hebrew (Kol Nedarim, Hebrew: כל נדרים) instead of Aramaic. The following provides the traditional Aramaic text, which (except for the Hebrew insert connecting one Day of Atonement to another) is quite similar in the various rites, although there are minor differences between the Ashkenazic, Eastern Ashkenaz and Sephardic liturgies. The following text is the Eastern Ashkenazic text, reflecting the two customs of which year it is referring to (and those who combine the texts).

Aramaic Text	English translation
כָּל נִדְרֵי, וֶאֱסָרֵי, וּשְבוּעֵי, וַחֲרָמֵי, וְקוֹנָמֵי, וְקִנוּסֵי, וְכִנוּיֵי, דִנְדַרְנָא, וּדְאִשְתַּבַּעְנָא, וּדְאַחֲרִמְנָא עַל נַפְשָׁתָנָא. •מִיוֹם כִּפּוּרִים שֶׁעָבַר עַד יוֹם כִּפּוּרִים זֶה, וּ־־• ♦מִיוֹם כִּפּוּרִם זֶה עַד יוֹם כִּפּוּרִים הַבָּא עָלֵינוּ לְטוֹבָה.♦ בְּכֻלְהוֹן אִחֲרַטְנָא בְהוֹן. כֻּלְהוֹן יְהוֹן שָׁרָן, שְׁבִיקין, שְׁבִיתִין, בְּטֵלִן וּמְבֻטָלִין, לָא שְׁרִירִין, וְלָא קַיָמִין. נִדְרָנָא לָא נִדְרֵי, וֶאֱסָרָנָא לָא אֱסָרֵי, וּשְׁבוּעָתָנָא לָא שְׁבוּעוֹת.	All vows, and prohibitions, and oaths, and consecrations, and konamei and kinusei and synonymous terms, that we may vow, or swear, or consecrate, or prohibit upon ourselves, •from the previous Day of Atonement until this Day of Atonement and ...• ♦from this Day of Atonement until the [next] Day of Atonement that will come for our benefit.♦ Regarding all of them, we repudiate them. All of them are undone, abandoned, cancelled, null and void, not in force, and not in effect. Our vows are no longer vows, and our prohibitions are no longer prohibitions, and our oaths are no longer oaths.

The leader and the congregation recite the verse "May all the people of Israel be forgiven, including all the strangers who live in their midst, for all the people are in fault" (Numbers 15:26) three times. Different regional traditions have woven it into the recitation in various ways.

In the Eastern Ashkenazic rite, the leader then adds: "O pardon the iniquities of this people, according to Thy abundant mercy, just as Thou forgavest this people ever since they left Egypt." And then the leader and congregation say together three times, "The Lord said, 'I pardon them according to your words.'" (quoting Numbers 14:19–20). The Torah scrolls are then put back in the Ark. In some communities there is a brief sermon at this point, and the Yom Kippur evening service begins.

According to some Kol Nidre must be recited before sunset, as it is a form of hatarat nedarim (annulment of vows), which, according to halakha, should not be performed on major holidays (of which Yom Kippur is one). However, according to the customs that recite Kol Nidrei for the following year ("from this Day of Atonement until the [next] Day of Atonement that will come for our benefit"), this would not constitute a hatarat nedarim, and it should be permitted on Yom Kippur itself.

== Origin and history ==
The date of the composition of the declaration and its author are alike unknown, but it was in existence at the Geonic period (589–1038 CE). There was a common theory that it commenced during and because of a period of extreme persecution, in which Jews were forced at sword's point to convert (either to Christianity or Islam) and that Kol Nidre would restore the person's Jewish identity by nullifying the conversion in the eyes of the Jewish community.

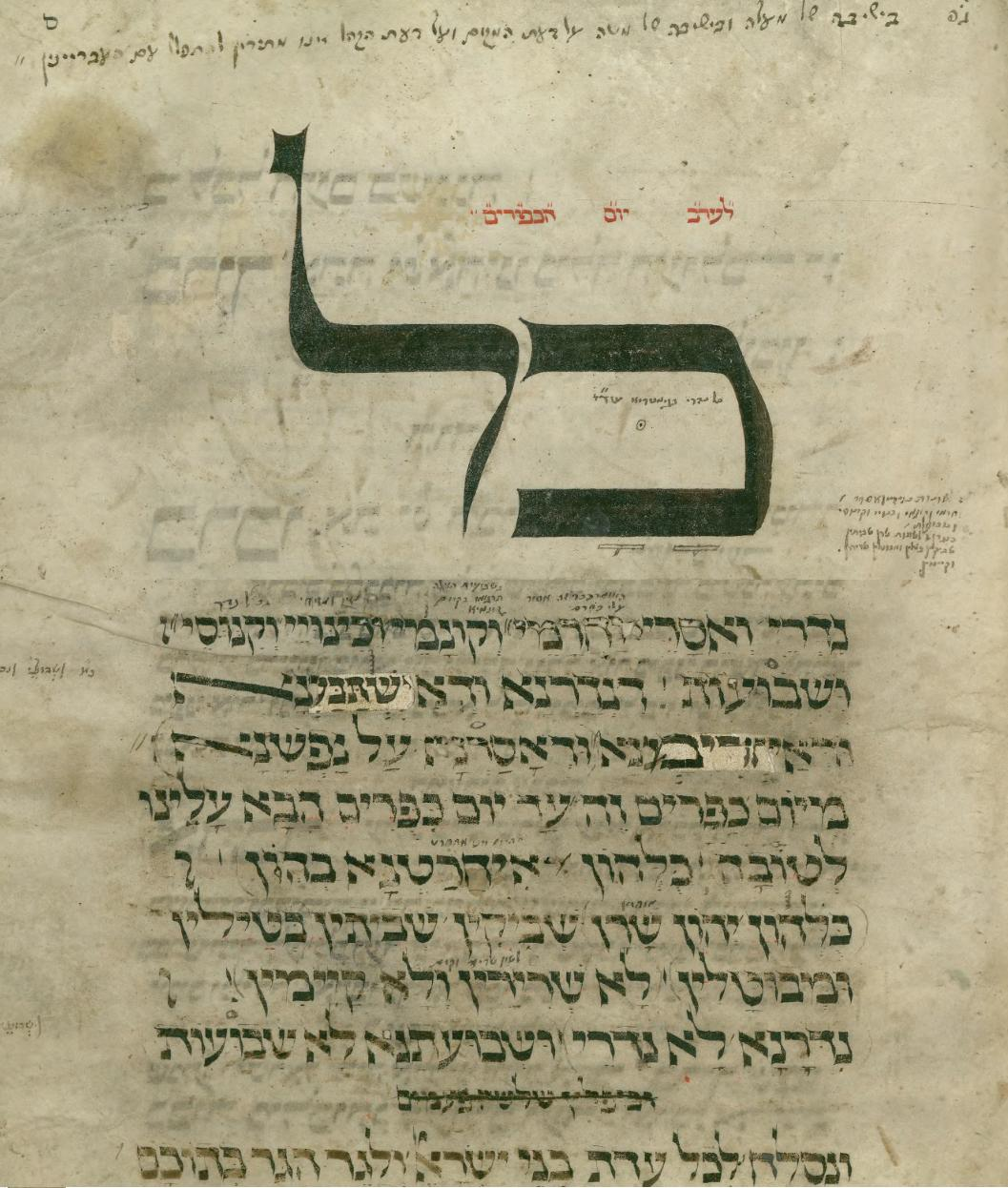

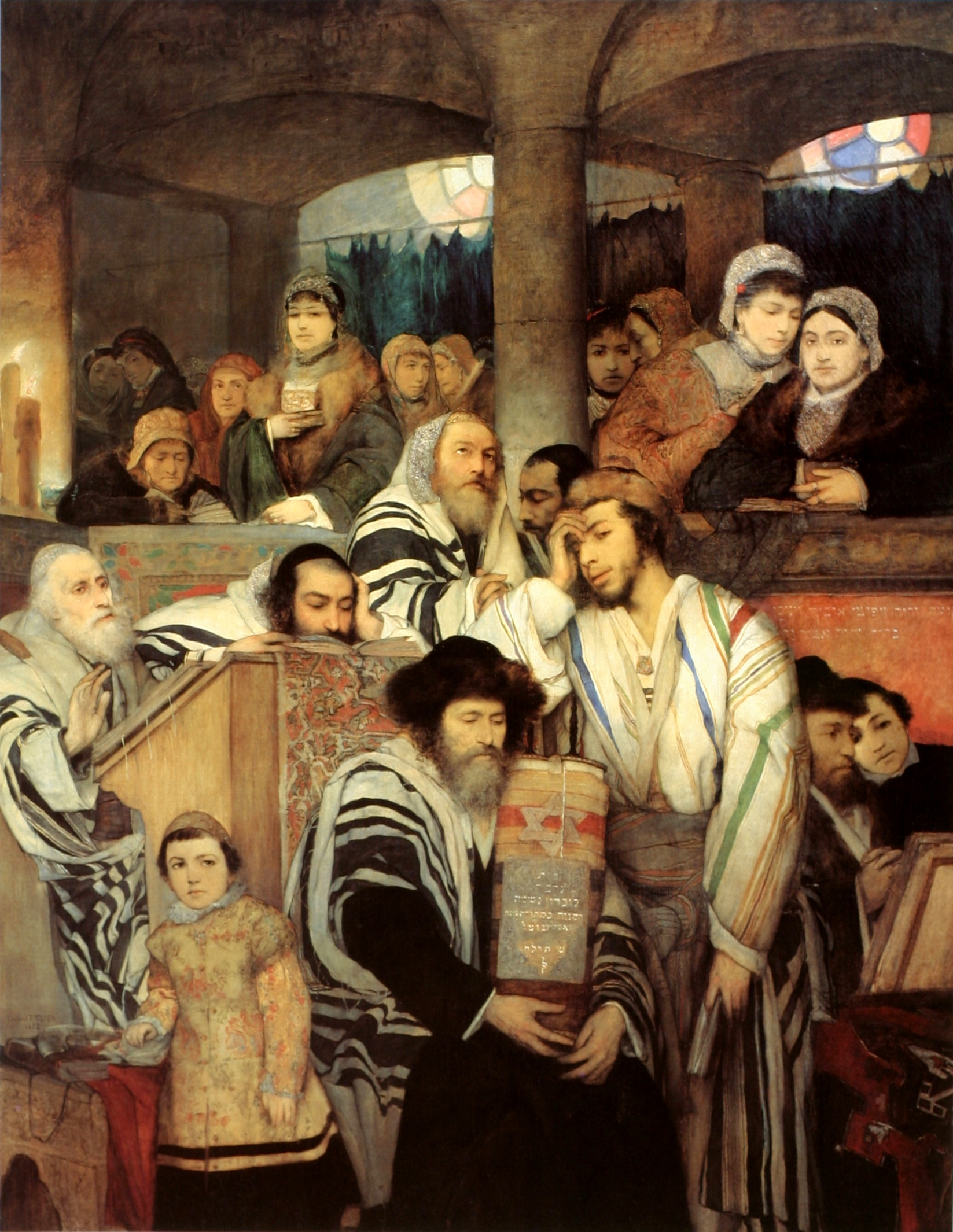
Jews Praying in the Synagogue on Yom Kippur

The tendency to make vows to God was strong in ancient Israel; the Torah found it necessary to caution against the promiscuous making of vows (Deuteronomy 23:23). As one commentary puts it, "it is considered a fearsome sin for one to violate his vows and oaths and the Sages regard it as an extremely serious matter for one to approach the Days of Judgment [meaning the High Holy Days] with such violation in hand." Rash vows to God that for whatever reason were not fulfilled created painful religious and ethical difficulties for those who had made them; this led to an earnest desire for dispensation from them. Therefore, halakha allowed for the absolution from a vow ('hattarat nedarim'), which might be performed only by a scholar, or an expert on the one hand, or by a board of three Jewish laymen on the other.

This rite declared that the petitioners, who were seeking reconciliation with God, solemnly retracted their vows and oaths they had made to God during the period intervening between the previous Yom Kippur and the present one; this rite made them null and void from the beginning, entreating in their stead pardon and forgiveness from God. This is in accordance with the older text of the formula as it is preserved in the Siddur of Amram Gaon.

=== Adoption into the prayer services ===
The readiness with which vows were made and the facility with which they were annulled by the scribes gave the Karaites an opportunity to attack rabbinic Jews. This may have encouraged the geonim (leaders of early medieval Babylonian Jewry) to minimize the power of dispensation. Yehudai Gaon of Sura (760 CE), author of the Halakot Pesukot, forbade the study of the Nedarim, the Talmudic treatise on oaths. Thus the Kol Nidre was discredited in both of the Babylonian academies and was not accepted by them.

Amram Gaon in his edition of the Siddur calls the custom of reciting the Kol Nidre a foolish one ("minhag shetut"). According to others however, it was customary to recite the formula in various lands of the Jewish dispersion, and it is clear likewise from Amram's Siddur that the usage was widespread as early as his time (9th century) in Spain. But the geonic practice of not reciting the Kol Nidre was long prevalent; it has never been adopted in the Catalan or in the Algerian ritual, nor in the French regions of Carpentras or Avignon.

At one time it was widely believed that the Kol Nidre was composed by Spanish "Marranos", Jews who were forced to convert to Christianity, yet who secretly maintained their original faith. This idea has been shown to be incorrect, as the prayer pre-dates this era (circa 15th century) by many centuries. However, this prayer was indeed used by the Marranos and it is possible that its great significance and wide usage derives from this persecution. As Kol Nidre clearly predated the Spanish Inquisition, it was supposed that it may have commenced during the Visigothic period in Spain (7th century), but this theory has serious weaknesses, such as its adoption by Jewish communities around the world, even in liturgical communities that did not experience such persecution. It may be that it was simply inspired by the Talmudic instructions about avoiding oaths.

A very different reason for Kol Nidre was suggested by the Zohar; God has already threatened and vowed terrible punishments upon the Jewish people for their sins, but by our own demonstration that we can unbind ourselves from vows using Kol Nidre we hope to persuade God to similarly annul His own vows of calamity. As stated in the Orot Sephardic mahzor:

According to the holy Zohar, Kol Nidre is recited on Yom Kippur because, at times, the Heavenly judgment is handed down as an 'avowed decree' for which there can normally be no annulment. By reciting the Kol Nidre annulment of vows at this time, we are asking of God that He favor us by annuling any negative decrees of judgment that await us, even though we are undeserving of such annulment.

=== Adoption into Yom Kippur services ===
Originally, the annulment of vows was performed on Rosh Hashana, the New Year, ten days before Yom Kippur. The Talmud says, "Who wished to cancel his vows of a whole year should arise on Rosh Hashanah and announce, 'All vows that I will pledge in the coming year shall be annulled.'" There is, in fact, a ritual that is supposed to take place the day before Rosh Hashana (because one does not do such chores on a holy day), known as hatarat nedarim (annulment of vows), where the individual presents himself before a tribunal of three and recites a Hebrew formula, very different from that of Kol Nidrei, asking for annulment of all vows.

So, from a time before the composition of Kol Nidrei there was a corresponding ritual intended for Rosh Hashana. It is believed that Kol Nidrei was added to the liturgy of Yom Kippur, ten days after Rosh Hashana, because that service is much more solemn, because Yom Kippur is entirely attuned to the theme of repentance and remorse, because (despite the great importance of Rosh Hashana) Yom Kippur services are better attended, and perhaps because Yom Kippur itself is once referred to as Rosh Hashana in Scripture (Ezekiel 40:1). Such reasons were enumerated by, among others, Asher ben Jehiel (early 14th century). There may be an additional reason—perhaps the annulment of vows was moved to, or repeated at, the beginning of Yom Kippur in order to minimize the risk that new vows would be made in the ten-day interval between the repudiation of vows on Rosh Hashana and Yom Kippur, and, more than the rather dry legalistic Rosh Hashana declaration, Kol Nidre includes an emotional expression of penitence that sets the theme for Yom Kippur.

=== Permission for sinners ===
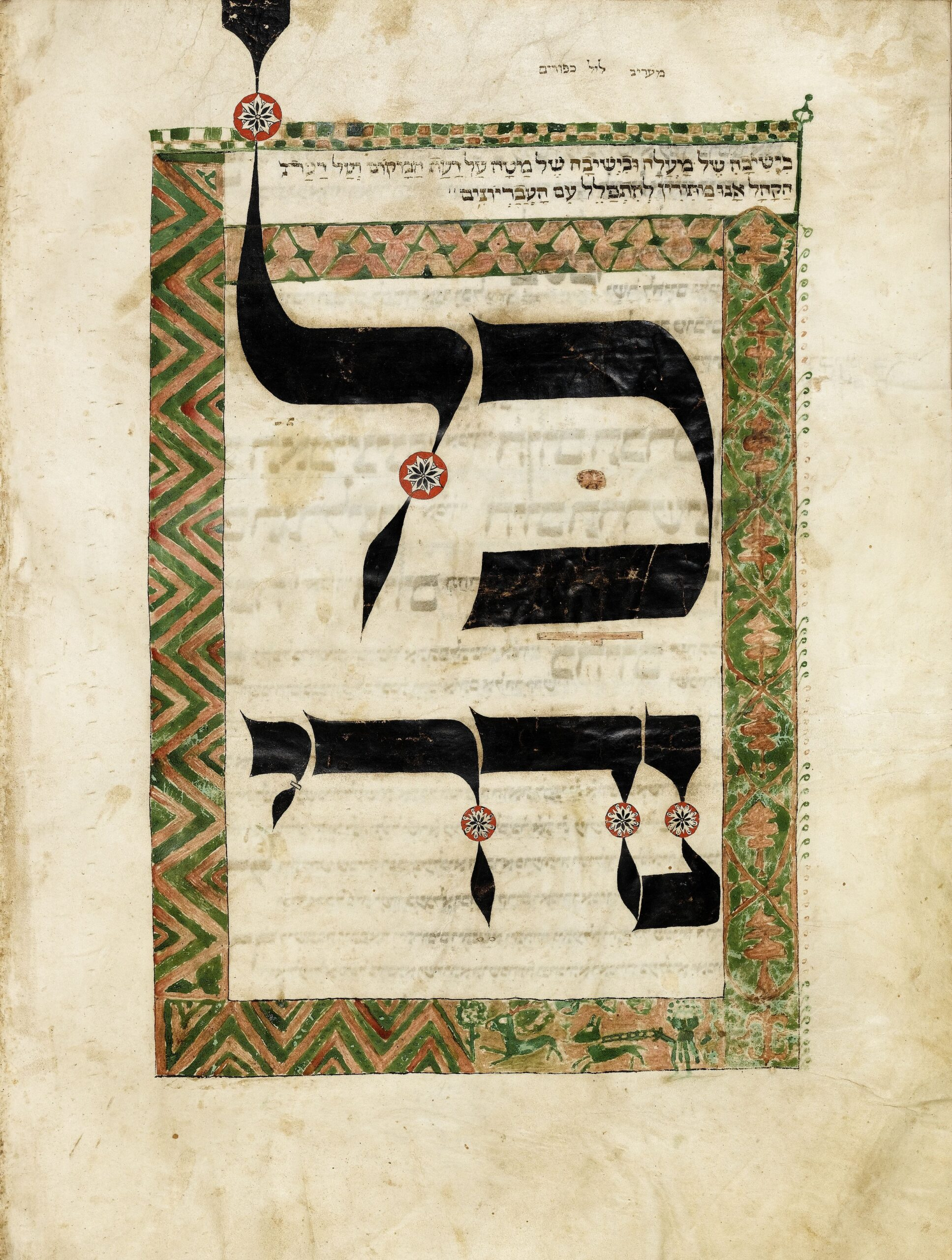
Esslingen Mahzor, 1290

Together with the Kol Nidre another custom developed: the recital before the Kol Nidre of the formula mentioned beginning "Bi-yeshivah shel ma'alah" (By authority of the Heavenly Court...), which has been translated above, and which gives permission to transgressors of the Law or to those under a ban "to pray with the congregation", or, according to another version, to the congregation "to pray with the transgressors of the Law." This addition is traced to Meir of Rothenburg (d. 1293), and was subsequently endorsed by the Rabbi of Mainz, Jacob ben Moses Moelin, "the Maharil" (died 1427), and substantiated by the Talmudic teaching that "Any community fast in which sinners do not participate, is not considered a [valid] fast." From Germany this custom spread to southern France, Spain, Greece, and probably to northern France, and was in time generally adopted.

It has been suggested that Kol Nidre originated with this invitation to avaryanim (sinners) to join the congregation's prayers, as an effort to inspire their return or at least prevent losing them completely, rather than as a mechanism for coping with Christian or Muslim persecution. The last word (העבריינים), usually translated as sinners or transgressors, is used in the Talmud for apostates or renegades, and in the Talmud Yerushalmi as a repetitious transgressor, indicating something worse than the usual reprobates, namely someone whose offenses are of such magnitude that he is no longer recognized by the Jewish community. Their inclusion in the Yom Kippur service is a temporary expedient, and does not operate as a remission of their sins or rejoin them to the congregation.

=== As it says ===
The original text of Kol Nidrei concluded, "as it says (Numbers 15:26): 'May all the people of Israel be forgiven, including all the strangers who live in their midst, for all the people are in fault,'" but Meir of Rothenburg ruled that the words 'as it says' should be removed, so the verse became an independent recitation. These words are still recited in the Italian rite.

=== Change of the Kol Nidre's tense from past to future ===
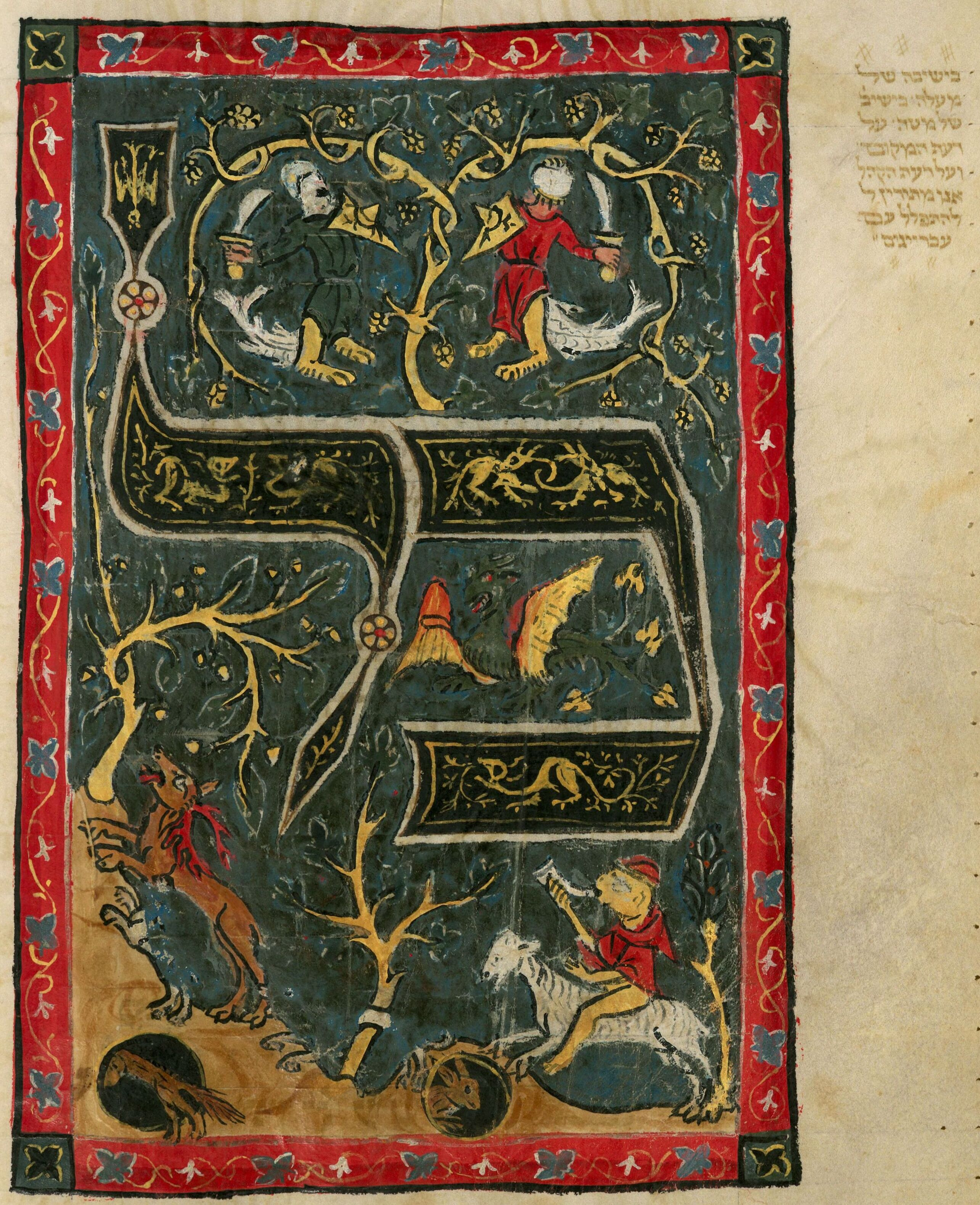
14th century David bar Pesach mahzor

An important alteration of the wording of the Kol Nidre was made by Rashi's son-in-law, Rabbi Meir ben Samuel (early 12th century), who changed the original phrase "from the last Day of Atonement until this one" to "from this Day of Atonement until the next". Thus, the dispensation was not a posteriori and concerning the unfulfilled obligations of the past year, but it was a priori, making reference to vows which one might not be able to fulfill or vows which one might forget to observe during the ensuing year. Meir ben Samuel likewise added the words "we do repent of them all", since real repentance is a condition of dispensation. The reasons for this change were that an "ex post facto" annulment of a vow was meaningless and, furthermore, that no one might grant to himself a dispensation, which might only be given by a board of three laymen or a competent judge. Additionally, the Talmudic discussion of the annulment of vows speaks of the negation of vows which will be made in the future. Finally, there was the distinct probability that a person would die with unfulfilled vows having been made since the previous Day of Atonement, so annulling these vows in advance might diminish the weight such unkept vows imposed on him at his death.

It was Rabbeinu Tam, however, who accounted for the alteration which was made by his father, as already stated, and he also tried to change the perfect tense of the verbs ("which we have vowed", "have sworn", etc.) to the imperfect. Whether the old text was already too deeply rooted, or whether Rabbeinu Tam did not correct these verbal forms consistently and grammatically, the old perfect forms are still retained at the beginning of the formula, but a future meaning is given to them.

The alteration which was made by Meïr ben Samuel, who concurred with Isaac ibn Ghayyat's view, was accepted in the German, northern French, and Polish rituals as well as in those rituals which were dependent on them, but it was not accepted in the Spanish, Roman, and Provençal rituals. The old version is, therefore, usually called the "Sephardic". The old and new versions are sometimes found side by side. Because it is traditional to recite the Kol Nidrei three times, some Sephardic communities and even some Ashkenazic communities (especially in Israel) make a point of reciting both versions (usually referring to the previous Yom Kippur in the first two iterations and usually referring to the next Yom Kippur in the third), with some reciting both versions one after the other each of the three times.

=== Language ===
In the Siddur of Amram Gaon (9th century; printed 1865, Warsaw, p. 47) and in the Roman Mahzor (ca. 1486; printed 1541 folio 232b, p. 63) and the Romaniote Machzor (Venice 1523) the Kol Nidrei is written in Hebrew, and therefore begins Kol Nedarim. Both Hebrew versions refer to vows of the year just concluded, rather than vows made in the coming year. The two Hebrew versions are slightly different from each other. Amram's version was apparently written unpointed, but a pointed version of Amram's Hebrew version is given in Birnbaum. Amram's Hebrew version is the one used in Balkan (Romaniote) and Italian liturgy. Otherwise, Ashkenaz and Sefardic liturgy has adopted Rabbeinu Tam's Aramaic text. The words "as it is written in the teachings of Moses, thy servant", which were said in the old form before the quotation of Numbers 15:26, were canceled by Meir of Rothenburg.

There has been some criticism from scholars fluent in Aramaic that the text of Kol Nidre has grammatical errors; however, any efforts to introduce corrections have been frustrated because the changes would not comport with the traditional, and much-beloved, melody.

=== Method of recitation ===
As to the manner in which the hazzan (cantor) is to recite the Kol Nidrei, the Mahzor Vitry (early 12th century) gives the following directions: "The first time he must utter it very softly like one who hesitates to enter the palace of the king to ask a gift of him whom he fears to approach; the second time he may speak somewhat louder; and the third time more loudly still, as one who is accustomed to dwell at court and to approach his sovereign as a friend." However, Rabbi Meier ben Yitzchak of Worms (11th century), author of Akdamut, would sing it only twice, the Aleppo community would sing it seven times, and Maharil (died 1427) would sing it repeatedly in various tunes to ensure that latecomers would hear it.

The number of Torah-scrolls taken out for the Kol Nidrei varied according to different customs. According to the custom of Frankfurt, no Torah Scrolls are removed; in other places one, two, three, seven, or even all that the synagogue possesses. The first Torah-scroll taken out is called the Sefer Kol Nidrei.

Although Kol Nidrei is printed in every prayerbook for Yom Kippur, and it is commonly thought of as being the beginning of Yom Kippur, according to the opinion that it is annulling oaths from the previous year, it must be performed before the commencement of Yom Kippur, since such juridical business cannot take place on a holy day. Kol Nidrei should be recited before sunset, since dispensation from a vow may not be granted on the Sabbath or on a feast-day, unless the vow refers to one of these days. However, some communities (apparently Sephardic and in the minority) consider it proper to wait until nightfall, when Yom Kippur officially begins, before reciting Kol Nidre. The men of the congregation wear their prayer shawls, one of the few times in the year that these are worn in the evening. It would appear, in most congregations, that a sort of compromise has been adopted; Kol Nidre begins just before sundown, so by the time its last repetition is finished nightfall has commenced or is on the very cusp of commencing.

== Analysis ==
The vows and pledges being annulled by this ceremony are of a limited category. The Kol Nidrei declaration can invalidate only vows that one undertakes on his own volition. It has no effect on vows or oath imposed by someone else, or a court. Also, the invalidation of future vows takes effect only if someone makes the vow without having in mind his previous Kol Nidrei declaration. But if he makes the vow with Kol Nidrei in mind—thus being openly insincere in his vow—the vow is in full force." Moreover, as Rabbi Yechiel of Paris explained in a Disputation that took place before the King and Queen of France in 1240, "Only the erroneously broken vows are annulled, that nobody might commit the sin of intentionally breaking vows."

Philip Birnbaum, in his edition of the Mahzor, comments on this passage: "It refers to vows assumed by an individual for himself alone, where no other persons or interests are involved. Though the context makes it perfectly obvious that no vows or obligations towards others are implied, there have been many who were misled into believing that by means of this formula all their vows and oaths are annulled. In the eleventh century Rabbi Meir ben Samuel (Rashi's son-in-law) changed the original wording of Kol Nidré so as to make it apply to the future instead of the past, that is, to vows that one might not be able to fulfill during the next year." This is the Nusach Ashkenaz version, the Nusach Sefard version still refers to the past year. However The Complete ArtScroll Machzor, Yom Kippur, Nusach Sefard has the future with the past included in brackets.

Kol Nidrei is not a prayer, it makes no requests and is not addressed to God, rather, it is a juristic declaration before the Yom Kippur prayers begin. It follows the juridical practice of requiring three men as a tribunal, the procedure beginning before sundown, and of the proclamation being announced three times.

=== Explanation of terms and variants ===
The many different terms for vows and pledges used in Kol Nidrei can be confusing, especially because the English language is poor in short equivalent terms that express the same nuances. These terms are almost exclusively religious pledges of various kinds: That something will be done (or not done) or given in exchange for a prayer being answered, that something will be done (or not done) for religious purposes or to show religious devotion, that a thing will be used only for religious purposes (e.g., as a tool used only for building or repairing the Temple) and never for mundane purposes, that a thing will be given to the Temple or treated as if it were already given to the Temple, and so forth. To make this declaration clearer, every possible synonym for such pledging and for nullification or cancellation of such pledges is used.

Such vows, it is obvious, are sometimes made impulsively or in moments of panic, desperation or some other strong emotion, and would be impossible, impractical, or ruinous to fulfill. This is shown by the following Biblical usage of the terms in Kol Nidrei:

- A vow (neder, נדר) was made by Jephthah (Judges 11:30), resulting in sacrificing his daughter in return for victory in battle; a "self-imposed obligation" (in the KJV "binding oneself")
- Osar (אסר) is used repeatedly in Numbers 30 to describe commitments a wife might make that the husband could nullify. The same word is used elsewhere in Scripture for a restraint or tying up (as in Judges chap. 15). In Talmudic usage it can also mean to interdict or to declare a thing to be forbidden.
- The regretted "oath" (shava, שׁבע) was made at Mizpah to cause the tribe of Benjamin to dwindle nearly to extinction (Judges 21:7). A similar shava made by Saul, which would have resulted in his son's execution but for the acclamation of the entire army (1 Samuel 14).
- Consecration (haromay, חרמי) is used for things whose use is dedicated (usually to the Temple) as in Leviticus 27:21,28.

After this point Amram's Hebrew version ceases to list forms of vows and shifts to synonyms for the making of vows, the list in the present day Kol Nidre uses Aramaic non-Biblical synonyms for pledges, which do not have equivalents in Biblical Hebrew:

- Konamay (קונמי) is used in the Talmud for a vow by which a tool or furnishing is forbidden for mundane use because pledged to Temple usage,
- kinusay (קנוסי) is used in the Talmud as a synonym for konamay.

Though these promises to God may have been ill-considered, the failure to keep them is a recurring offense – and acting as if promises made to God were so trifling that they could be thoughtlessly forgotten is a further offense; the only remedy is, first, to admit that these promises will never be fulfilled, by formally cancelling them – which is one of the purposes of the Kol Nidrei, and then to repent for them – which is the purpose of the Day of Atonement.

It has even been suggested that Kol Nidrei includes vows that had been fulfilled, because the Torah forbids the making of vows, so that even those which were kept required atonement. There is also a kabbalistic or spiritual purpose to Kol Nidrei: God has vowed, in Scripture, to punish Jewry for its sins; therefore by demonstrating that we can and do cancel our own vows, we hope to induce God to cancel His own dire decrees.

Kol Nidrei also admits our moral inconstancy. We made promises and pledges to God, often at a peak feeling of devotion or gratitude—or of desperation, but our good intentions are short-lived, and we allowed the promises to slip from our attention.

The text presented here is taken from the ArtScroll Mahzor for Yom Kippur (Ashkenaz ed.), which uses the formula "from this Day of Atonement to the next" in its main text but allows the alternative ("from the last Day of Atonement to this Day") as a parenthetical option. The Hebrew version of Kol Nidrei set out in the Siddur of Rav Amram Gaon (ca. 870) uses the formula "from the last ... to this ...", and similarly De Sola Pool. Wolf von Heidenheim's mahzor uses "from this Day ... to the next ...", and similarly Adler, and Birnbaum. The Rinat Yisroel combines both, "from the last ... to this..., and from this....", and similarly the Syrian and other Sefardic or Mizrahi traditions set forth in the Orot mahzor and the Bagdadi version.

The Sefardic and Mizrahi traditions add one or two more synonyms for pledges (such as harem). Some Ashkenaz and Sefardic editions omit "and any synonymous terms"—וכנויי—that appears here in the first sentence.

== Historical controversies ==
=== Use by anti-semites ===
The Kol Nidrei prayer has been used by non-Jews as a basis for asserting that an oath taken by a Jew may not be trusted. Historically, this accusation was leveled so often and so persistently that many non-Jewish legislators considered it necessary to have a special form of oath administered to Jews ("Oath More Judaico"), and many judges refused to allow them to take a supplementary oath, basing their objections chiefly on this prayer. As early as 1240 in the Disputation of Paris, Yechiel of Paris was obliged to defend Kol Nidrei against these charges. The Russian government, in 1857, decreed that the prayerbooks must include, as an introduction to Kol Nidrei, a Hebrew explanation to the readers of the limited nature of the vows that could be released by this ceremony.

As Prof. Ismar Elbogen said in his monumental study of Jewish Liturgy:

It is well known how many baseless accusations the text of [Kol Nidre] has aroused against Jews in the course of centuries. But nowhere in the sources can any interpretation of a morally offensive nature be found, for the [rabbinic] authorities agree unanimously that the text has in view only obligations undertaken by an individual toward himself or obligations respecting cultic regulations of the community.

=== Jewish rebuttals ===
Rabbis have always pointed out that the dispensation from vows in Kol Nidrei refers only to those an individual voluntarily assumes for himself alone and in which no other persons or their interests are involved. The first verse ends with a qualifier for all the forms of pledges and vows being annulled—עַל נַפְשָׁתָֽנָא—"regarding ourselves"—by which this formula is limited to annulling only those vows that would affect only ourselves but not vows that would affect any other person. The formula is restricted to those vows between man and God alone; they have no effect on vows made between one man and another. No vow, promise, or oath that concerns another person, a court of justice, or a community is implied in Kol Nidrei. It does not matter if a vow was made to one or more non-Jews, such a vow cannot be annulled. According to Jewish doctrine, the sole purpose of this prayer is to give protection from divine punishment in case of violation of the vow.

With reference to the annulment of vows described in Numbers 30, as well as to Kol Nidre, the then Chief Rabbi of the British Empire, Joseph Hertz wrote:

... Not all vows or oaths could be absolved. A vow or oath that was made to another person, even be that person a child or a heathen, could not be annulled except in the presence of that person and with his consent; while an oath which a man had taken in a court of justice could not be absolved by any other authority in the world.

As pointed out above, many rabbis state that the vows referred to are applicable only to the individual, and not interpersonally. Moreover, the Biblical verse quoted at the end clearly refers to vows that were unintentionally unkept, not premeditatedly broken. It refers only to vows between the person making them and God, such as "I swear that if I pass this test, I'll pray every day for the next 6 months!" or simply "I swear that I will stop smoking this year!"

Because this declaration has often been held up by anti-Semites as proof that Jews are untrustworthy, the Reform movement removed it from the liturgy - temporarily, but there was enough popular demand for its restoration. This ritual gave comfort to those who were forcibly converted to Christianity, yet felt unable to break their vow to follow Christianity. In recognition of that history, the Reform movement restored this recitation to its liturgy.

=== Jewish opposition ===
Five geonim (rabbinic leaders of medieval Babylonian Jewry) were against, while only one was in favor of reciting the formula. Saadia Gaon (early 10th century) wished to restrict it to those vows extorted from the congregation in the synagogue in times of persecution, and he declared explicitly that the "Kol Nidre" gave no absolution from oaths an individual took during the year.

Judah ben Barzillai (Spain, 12th century), in his work on Jewish law "Sefer haIttim", declares that the custom of reciting the Kol Nidre was unjustifiable and misleading, since many ignorant persons believe that all their vows and oaths are annulled through this formula, and consequently they take such obligations on themselves carelessly. For the same reason Rabbenu Yerucham (Provence, 14th century) criticized those who, relying on Kol Nidrei, made vows recklessly, and he declared them incapable of giving testimony. Other prominent opponents of it in the Middle Ages include Yom Tov Asevilli ("Ritva", ca. 1330); Isaac ben Sheshet ("Rivash", d. 1406); the author of the Kol Bo (15th century); and Leon of Modena (d. 1648). In addition, nearly all printed machzorim contain expositions and explanations of the "Kol Nidre" in the restricted sense mentioned above.

== Reform in the 19th century ==
Yielding to the numerous accusations and complaints brought against "Kol Nidrei" in the course of centuries, the rabbinical conference held at Brunswick in 1844 decided unanimously that the formula was not essential, and that the members of the convention should exert their influence toward securing its speedy abolition.

The decision of the conference was accepted by many congregations of western Europe and in all the American Reform Judaism congregations, which while retaining the melody substituted for the formula a German hymn or a Hebrew psalm (particularly Psalm 130), or changed the old text to the words, "May all the vows arise to thee which the sons of Israel vow unto thee, O Lord, ... that they will return to thee with all their heart, and from this Day of Atonement until the next," etc. Naturally there were many Orthodox opponents of this innovation, among whom M. Lehmann, editor of the Israelit, was especially prominent. In 1961, Kol Nidrei, in its full Aramaic text, was restored to the Reform liturgy, so strong was its sentimental appeal. Among Reconstructionist Jews, it was briefly omitted from the liturgy and then restored but with a slightly revised text that limited its application only to those vows that operated "to estrange ourselves from those who have offended us or to give pain to those who have angered us".

At other times and places during the 19th century emphasis was frequently laid upon the fact that "in the 'Kol Nidrei' only those vows and obligations are implied that are voluntarily assumed, and that are, so to speak, taken before God, thus being exclusively religious in content; but that those obligations are in no wise included that refer to other persons or to non-religious relations." Even before 1844, some rabbis and congregations (not all of them Liberal) had ceased reciting Kol Nidre: It is not found in the Berlin 1817 prayerbook, nor the Hamburg prayerbooks of 1819 and 1841, and the famous pioneer of Modern Orthodoxy, Rabbi Samson Raphael Hirsch, had omitted it during Yom Kippur services at least twice. In 1840, Rabbi Leopold Stein (who later became the Rabbi of Frankfurt on Main) published a volume of German language prayers and hymns offered as additions or alternatives to the traditional ones, and for a substitute for Kol Nidre he provided the hymn (apparently his own work), "O Tag des Herrn!" (O Day of the Lord); adding a lengthy footnote that said, "That much though is certain and cannot be denied by anyone -- that the [Kol Nidre] formula is by no means suited to introduce the holiest of all days, and that it would have been more suitable for any occasion but that of the eve of the exalted Day of Atonement." An English translation - "O come, day of God" - of Stein's hymn was used, in the place of Kol Nidre, in the American Reform Union Prayer Book (1945 & 1963) - the 1894 edition of the Union Prayer Book had a slightly different English translation but it appears that some editions between then and 1945 were defective and erroneously omitted most of the pages (this page among them) for the eve of 'Atonement Day', but Kol Nidre was returned to the Reform liturgy in subsequent prayerbooks.

In the opinion of some Jewish writers, the principal factor that preserved the religious authority of the Kol Nidrei is its plaintive melody.

== The Ashkenazi melody ==
An ahistorical legend claims that the tune for Kol Nidre is missinai - unchanged since Moses climbed down from Mount Sinai. In the early 17th century, Rabbi Mordechai Jaffe of Prague, known as the Levush, mentioned that all cantors knew a set melody which was traditional for Kol Nidre. Jaffe was actually complaining that the widespread and solid adherence to this melody was hampering his efforts to introduce corrections into the words. And yet there are probably no two synagogues in which the melody is chanted note for note absolutely the same. Indeed, a critical examination of the variants shows near-agreement in the essentials of the first strain only, with transformations of great diversity in the remaining strains. However, these divergences are not radical, and are inevitable in a composition not due to a single originator, but built up and elaborated by many in turn, and handed on by them in distinct lines of tradition, along all of which the rhapsodical method of the hazzanut has been followed.

The musical structure of the Ashkenazi Kol Nidrei is built upon a simple groundwork, the melody being an intermingling of simple cantillation with rich figuration. The opening of Kol Nidre is what the masters of the Catholic plainsong term a "pneuma", or soul breath. Instead of announcing the opening words in a monotone or in any of the familiar declamatory phrases, a hazzan of South Germany prefixed a long, sighing tone, falling to a lower note and rising again, as if only sighs and sobs could find utterance before the officiant could bring himself to inaugurate the Day of Atonement.

=== Similarities to Christian plainsong ===
Pianist Emil Breslauer of the 19th century was the first to draw attention to the similarity of these strains with the first five bars of the sixth movement of Beethoven's C sharp minor quartet, op. 131, "adagio quasi un poco andante".

An older coincidence shows the original element around which the whole of Kol Nidre has been built up. The pneuma given in the Sarum and Ratisbon antiphonaries (or Roman Catholic ritual music-books) as a typical passage in the Gregorian mode (or the notes in the natural scale running from "d" to "d" ["re" to "re"]), almost exactly outlines the figure that prevails throughout the Hebrew air, in all its variants, and reproduces one favorite strain with still closer agreement.

The original pattern of these phrases seems to be the strain of melody so frequently repeated in the modern versions of Kol Nidre at the introduction of each clause. Such a pattern phrase, indeed, is, in the less elaborated Italian tradition, repeated in its simple form five times consecutively in the first sentence of the text, and a little more elaborately four times in succession from the words "nidrana lo nidre".

The northern traditions prefer at such points first to utilize its complement in the second ecclesiastical mode of the Church, which extends below as well as above the fundamental "re". The strain, in either form, must obviously date from the early medieval period, anterior to the 11th century, when the practice and theory of the singing-school at St. Gall, by which such typical passages were evolved, influenced all music in those French and German lands where the melody of Kol Nidre took shape.

Thus, then, a typical phrase in the most familiar Gregorian mode, such as was daily in the ears of the Rhineland Jews, in secular as well as in ecclesiastical music, was centuries ago deemed suitable for the recitation of Kol Nidrei, and to it was afterward prefixed an introductory intonation dependent on the taste and capacity of the officiant. Many times repeated, the figure of this central phrase was sometimes sung on a higher degree of the scale, sometimes on a lower. Then these became associated; and so gradually the middle section of the melody developed into the modern forms.

=== Inspiration for other musical pieces ===
The prayer and its melody have been the basis of a number of pieces of classical music, including a setting of the prayer by Arnold Schoenberg, a piece for solo cello and orchestra by Max Bruch, symphonic variations for orchestra by Emil von Reznicek, a string quartet by John Zorn, and others.

The Electric Prunes album Release of An Oath, subtitled and commonly called The Kol Nidre after the title of its first and thematically most central track, is based on a combination of Christian and Jewish liturgy.

== Popular culture ==
by Auguste van Biene
Zonophone A 60, with van Biene on cello, circa 1908

Composer and cellist Auguste van Biene recorded his own arrangement of Kol Nidre in around 1908, with an unidentified pianist.

Comedian Lewis Black frequently references the Kol Nidre in some of his shows and his first book, Nothing's Sacred, referring to it as the spookiest piece of music ever written, claiming that it may have been the piece to inspire all of Alfred Hitchcock's musical scores.

Kol Nidre plays a climactic role in several film and television adaptations of The Jazz Singer, originally a play by Samson Raphaelson. In the 1927 film version, Kol Nidre is sung by notable Jewish entertainer Al Jolson. In the 1952 film version, it is sung by Danny Thomas, who in real life was a devout Christian of Lebanese heritage. In the 1959 television version, it is sung by Jewish comedian Jerry Lewis. Jewish singer Neil Diamond performs the song in the 1980 film version.

In 1968, the American rock band The Electric Prunes released the album Release of an Oath, which opens with a contemporary adaptation of Kol Nidre and incorporates Jewish liturgical themes into psychedelic and orchestral rock. Contemporary newspaper coverage in the United States and Australia highlighted the album’s effort to bring the traditional prayer into a modern musical context and noted its connection to the group’s earlier Mass in F Minor.

== See also ==
- Jewish services
- Neder
- Oath More Judaico
- Siddur
- Yom Kippur

== Notable musical performances and adaptations ==
- Kol Nidre setting for speaker, chorus, and orchestra by Arnold Schoenberg, op. 39 (1938).
- Kol Nidre sung by Perry Como, RCA LPM-3188, 1953
- Kol Nidre sung by Johnny Mathis, orchestration by Percy Faith, Columbia Records CK 64891, 1958
- Kol Nidrei for violin, cello, and harp and orchestra by Max Bruch, Julian Lloyd Webber, soloist, 1998
