= Montgomery P. Berry =

American politician

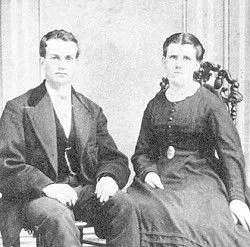
- Berry with his second wife, Jane Eddon Berry

10th Commander of the Department of Alaska
- In office June 14, 1877 – August 13, 1877
- President: Rutherford B. Hayes
- Preceded by: Arthur Morris
- Succeeded by: Henry Charles DeAhna

Military service
- Allegiance: United States
- Branch/service: United States Army; Union Army
- Years of service: 1847-1848; 1861-1865
- Rank: Major
- Battles/wars: Mexican American War; American Civil War

Montgomery Pike Berry (c. 1828 — December 28, 1898) was a collector of customs for the United States Department of the Treasury. From June 14, 1877, to August 13, 1877, he was the highest-ranking federal official in the Department of Alaska, making him the de facto governor of the territory.

Berry was born in Kentucky, and served in the Mexican-American War and the American Civil War, rising to the rank of Major. He was also sheriff of Grant County, Oregon and Superintendent of the Oregon State Penitentiary before President Ulysses S. Grant appointed him as collector of customs in March 1874. He lived in Sitka, Alaska until his death.
