= Emanuel Wirth =

German violinist and violist (1842–1923)

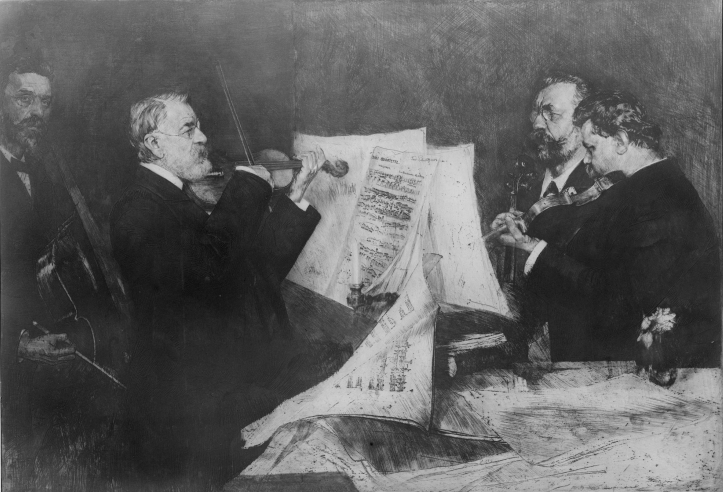
The famous Joachim Quartett. From left to right: Robert Hausmann (cello), Joseph Joachim (1. violin), Emanuel Wirth (viola) and Karel Halíř (2. violin)

Emanuel Wirth (18 October 1842 – 5 January 1923) was a German violinist and violist.

Wirth was born in Žlutice in western Bohemia and studied violin at the Prague Conservatory. He then became the concertmaster of the opera in Rotterdam, where he led his own string quartet, and eventually he joined the Joachim String Quartet along with cellist Robert Hausmann and pianist Heinrich Barth. He remained in the quartet for 30 seasons from 13 October 1877 to 13 May 1907 (year of Joachim's death).

During his time at the Joachim Quartet, Wirth joined the faculty at the Berlin University of the Arts to become Joseph Joachim's assistant and taught violin and viola. Some of his students included John Marquardt, Albert Stoessel, Edmund Severn, and Agnes Tschetschulin. August Wilhelmj has said that he was the best violin teacher of his generation.

His son Joseph Wirth married Julia Wirth née Stockhausen (1886–1964), daughter of the singer and voice teacher Julius Stockhausen. Wirth died in Berlin.
