= John Mendenhall (colonel) =

American military figure and politician

John Ross Mendenhall

8th Commander of the Department of Alaska
- In office June 15, 1876 – March 4, 1877
- President: Ulysses S. Grant; Rutherford B. Hayes
- Preceded by: Joseph B. Campbell
- Succeeded by: Arthur Morris

Personal details
- Born: July 29, 1829 Vevay, Indiana
- Died: July 1, 1892 (aged 62) Newport, Rhode Island
- Resting place: West Point Cemetery

Military service
- Allegiance: United States
- Branch/service: United States Army; Union Army
- Years of service: 1851–1892
- Rank: Colonel
- Commands: Department of Alaska; 2nd Artillery Regiment

John Ross Mendenhall (July 29, 1829 – July 1, 1892) was an officer in the United States Army. As a Union Army artillery officer in the American Civil War, his performance was notable at the Battle of Stones River, where his concentration of guns broke the last Confederate attack.

== Before the Civil War ==
Mendenhall was born in Vevay, Indiana, son of Miles and Nancy Mendenhall. He entered the United States Military Academy at West Point on July 1, 1847, graduating on July 1, 1851. Mendenhall's first assignment was as a brevet second lieutenant of cavalry at the barracks in Carlisle, Pennsylvania. Transferring to the 4th Artillery on February 20, 1852, he served at Fort Mifflin, Pennsylvania, 1852–1853. On frontier duty at Ringgold Barracks, Texas, he was promoted to second lieutenant on October 8, 1853. After serving in the garrison of Fort Hamilton, New York, 1854–1855, he was on frontier duty at Fort Leavenworth, Kansas, 1855. He was engaged in two skirmishes in 1855. Mendenhall was at Fort Laramie in Dakota Territory 1855–1856. Promoted to first lieutenant in 1856, he served in Florida during hostilities with the Seminoles. Lt. Mendenhall was back at Fort Leavenworth during the Bleeding Kansas disturbances of 1857–1858, and once more at Fort Laramie in 1858. He was in the garrison of Fort Columbus, New York, in 1859, followed by recruiting service in the same year. He was assigned to the Artillery School for Practice at Fort Monroe, Virginia, from 1859 to the outbreak of the war in 1861. He was promoted to captain, 4th Artillery, on July 3, 1861. Mendenhall married Sophia Elizabeth Mix (1838–1895) on November 27, 1858.

== War service ==
At the outbreak of the war, MG John E. Wool retained Mendenhall to train artillery recruits. Capt. Mendenhall first saw combat commanding batteries H and M of the 4th Artillery in the Army of the Ohio, supporting the division of Brig. Gen. William "Bull" Nelson. At the Battle of Shiloh, on the second day of the battle, April 7, 1862, his guns supported Nelson's attack on the Confederate lines. Several senior officer, including MG Don Carlos Buell, the army's commander, praised Mendenhall and his gunners for outstanding work. For his work at Shiloh, Mendenhall was appointed to the brevet rank of major in the regular army to rank from the day of the battle. He continued in Nelson's division during the Siege of Corinth, taking part in a minor fight with the Confederates on May 8, 1862.

At the Battle of Stones River, Capt. Mendenhall was chief of artillery to Left Wing commander Maj. Gen. Thomas L. Crittenden when he was assigned to collect guns at McFadden's Ford to stop an attack by the division of Maj. Gen. John C. Breckinridge on the Union left flank. The 45 guns plus another dozen in enfilading position broke the Confederate attack and relieved the threat to the federal left. Mendenhall was promoted to the rank of major and continued on Crittenden's staff. At the Battle of Chickamauga he pulled together another grand battery to resist the Confederate breakthrough on the second day of the battle, but he lost many of these guns. Mendenhall received brevet rank of lieutenant colonel for his role in that battle. On November 19, 1863, Mendenhall was appointed judge advocate of the Fourth Army Corps. However, he often served as an artillery officer and performed little judicial duties.

Late in the war, Maj. Mendenhall was inspector of artillery of the Department of the Cumberland. By March 1865, he was commander of the Artillery Reserve of the department, a post he held to the end of the war.

== Post war ==
After the war, Mendenhall served in Michigan, the Carolinas, California, Alaska, Massachusetts, Rhode Island, New York, and Connecticut. He served as commander of the Department of Alaska, from June 15, 1876, to March 4, 1877. He died as colonel of the Second Artillery, while commanding Fort Adams in Newport, Rhode Island, on July 1, 1892. He left his widow and three grown sons: Clarence Miles, Theodore John, and Leo Thomas Crittenden. Col. Mendenhall was buried at West Point.
