= Karel Halíř =

Czech violinist

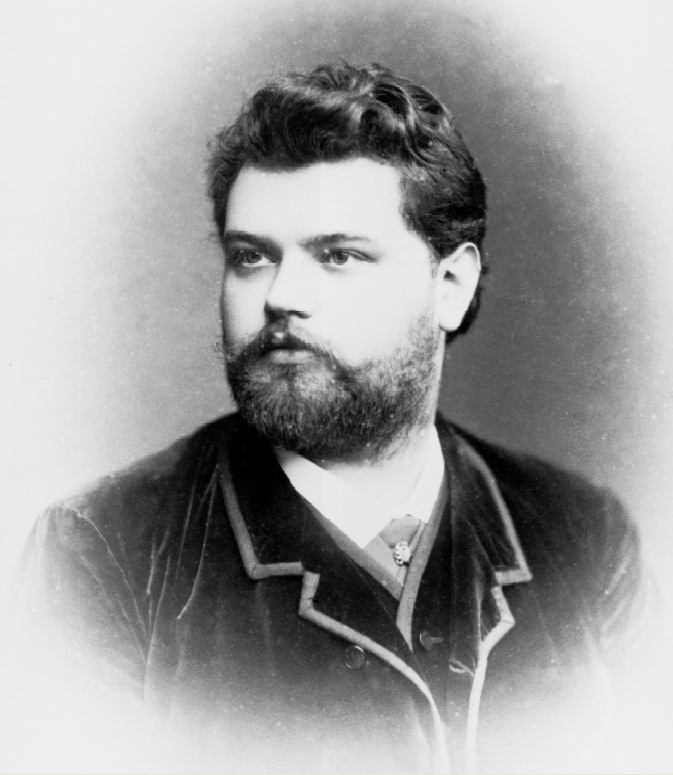
Karel Halíř

Karel Halíř (1 February 1859 – 21 December 1909) was a Czech violinist who lived mainly in Germany. "Karel" is also given as Karol, Karl or Carl; "Halíř" is also given as Halir or Haliř.

== Life ==
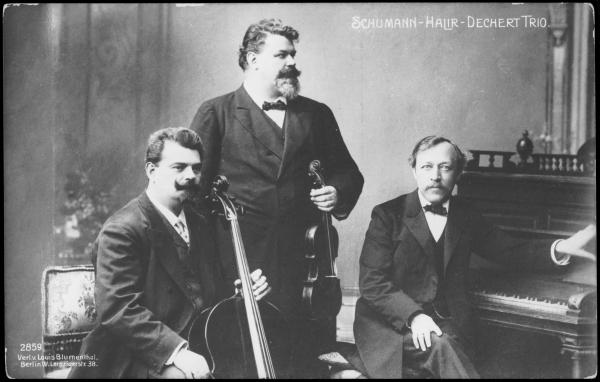
Trio of Georg Schumann, Hugo Dechert and Karel Halíř

Karel Halíř was born in Hohenelbe, Bohemia (now Vrchlabí, Czech Republic), and studied with Antonín Bennewitz at the Prague Conservatory (1867–73) and with Joseph Joachim in Berlin (1874–76). For the next four years (1876-1879) he was concertmaster of the Benjamin Bilse Kapelle in Berlin. After short periods as concertmaster of the orchestras at Königsberg (1879) and Mannheim (1881), he spent ten years at Weimar (1884–94). He first attracted widespread notice in Germany as a soloist with his playing of Bach's Double Concerto with Joseph Joachim at the Bach Festival at Eisenach in 1884. In 1894 Halíř took over as concertmaster of the Berlin opera orchestra, the Königliche Kapelle, and joined the faculty of the Berlin Königliche Hochschule für Musik. At that time he started his own quartet in Berlin with Carl Markees, Adolf Müller, and Hugo Dechert, which had a subscription series for fifteen years. Later he also founded a Piano Trio group with his Hochschule colleague Georg Schumann on piano and Hugo Dechert on cello. Halíř additionally joined the Joachim Quartet in 1897, playing second violin with Joseph Joachim, Emanuel Wirth on viola, and Robert Hausmann on cello.

Halíř maintained his career as a soloist while playing in orchestras and ensembles all his life. He toured the United States in 1896 and 1897, and admired particularly for his playing of the Beethoven's Violin Concerto in D major, which he performed at his debut with the New York Philharmonic on 13 November 1896; his performance was described as "one of the most interesting and admirable pieces of violin playing that have been heard in New York". The performance was compared favorably to the previous performance of the work in New York by Eugène Ysaÿe, and the review concluded, "To hear Herr Halir play ... is to understand what is meant by classical violin playing". On 4 December 1896 he gave the first performance in Carnegie Hall of Louis Spohr’s Violin Concerto No. 8, with the New York Symphony Orchestra conducted by Walter Damrosch.

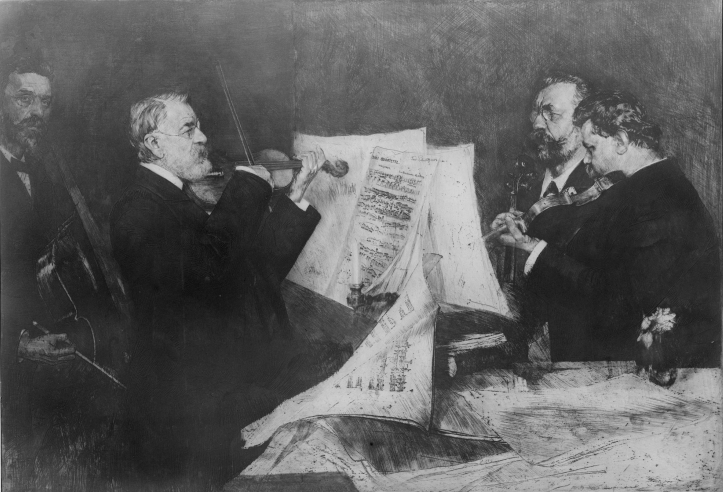
Joachim Quartet: (from left to right) Robert Hausmann (cello), Joseph Joachim (1st violin), Emanuel Wirth (viola) and Karel Halíř (2nd violin)

Although not the soloist at the premiere (that was Adolph Brodsky), Karel Halíř championed Tchaikovsky’s Violin Concerto in D major, which was not popular in its early years. When Tchaikovsky attended a performance of the work by Halíř in Leipzig in 1888, he called it "a memorable day". On October 19, 1905, Halíř premiered the revised version of Sibelius’s Violin Concerto in D minor in Berlin, with the Berlin Philharmonic under the baton of Richard Strauss. That same program had Halíř playing the premiere of Charles Martin Loeffler’s Divertissement for violin and orchestra, which Fritz Kreisler and Eugène Ysaÿe had declined to play owing to its technical demands. He premiered other works, such as the Violin Concerto by the Danish composer Eduard Lassen, which was dedicated to him, in Frankfurt in 1889. He gave the European premiere of Amy Beach’s Violin Sonata in Berlin on 28 October 1899, with Teresa Carreño. He wrote a cadenza for Brahms's Violin Concerto in D major. As a member of the Joachim Quartet, Halíř toured extensively. They played a series of concerts every year in London, and were regulars at the bi-annual Beethoven Haus Festival in Bonn. In 1905 they performed the complete Beethoven Quartets in London, Paris, and Rome. The Quartet disbanded after Joachim’s death in August 1907. Halíř died suddenly in Berlin on 21 December 1909, at age fifty.

Halíř’s successor at the Hochschule was the Joachim student Willy Hess, who also took over Halíř’s Quartet and Trio ensembles.

In 1888 Karel Halíř married Therese Zerbst (1859-1910), a noted soprano from Berlin. His pupils included David Mannes, Arthur M. Abbell and Gustav Adolf Huber.

== Sources ==
- Grove’s Dictionary of Music and Musicians, 5th ed.
- Hugo Riemann. Riemann Musiklexikon 1919. p. 453. Accessed August 27, 2018.
