= Neder =

Judaic vow or oath

In Judaism, a neder (Hebrew pronunciation: [neˈdeːʁ], plural nedarim Hebrew pronunciation: [neˌdaˈʁiːm]) is a kind of vow or oath. The neder may consist of performing some act in the future (either once or regularly) or abstaining from a particular type of activity of the person's choice. The concept of the neder and the Jewish law related to it, is described at the beginning of the parashah of Matot.

== Laws ==
A neder is a self-made oral declaration which makes an object prohibited to the person making the vow. The person thus creates a prohibition (issur) having the status of scriptural law (De'oraita), as the Torah states:

When the man pledges a vow (yidor neder) to Hashem, or swears an oath (hishavA` shevuah), proscribing a prohibition (le'esor issar) on himself, he shall not desecrate his word; whatever has come out of his mouth he must do.

From the phrase "he must do," the rabbis deduced that there exists a positive commandment to fulfill what one said, as well as a negative prohibition not to desecrate one's word.

The word "neder" is mentioned 33 times in the Pentateuch, 19 of which occur in the Book of Numbers.

Judaism views the power of speech as very strong. It is speech that distinguishes humans from animals, and has the power to accomplish a lot for better or for worse. Due to the strength of a neder, and the fact that one must absolutely be fulfilled if made, many pious Jews engage in the practice of saying "b'li neder" after a statement that they will do something, meaning that their statement is not a binding neder in the event they cannot fulfill their pledge due to unforeseen circumstances.

The most common way a neder is made is through verbal pronunciation. But according to some opinions, the performance of an act on three consecutive occasions is akin to a neder.

=== The distinction between neder and shevuah ===
The word neder is often translated into English and other languages as a "vow", while shevu'ah is often rendered as "oath", though no single English word exactly describes either.

The neder may be a promise of prohibition or deprivation (neder issar, e.g., "Let all beans be forbidden to me for thirty days"), or a dedication to the Temple (neder heḳdesh, e.g. "I pledge to bring a burnt-offering"). The latter case forbids the object's benefit to the person making the neder, and obligates him to bring it to its new "owner." Thus the thing common to any neder is that it applies to the object, not the person. When a specific object is pledged, the neder is also called a nedavah, dedication, which is the name in Deut. 12:17; an example is, "This [animal] shall be a burnt-offering."

In contrast, the type of shevu`ah mentioned above (referred to by the Sages as shevu'at bitui, שבעת ביטוי) (and distinct from "oath" in testimony and jurisprudence, also called shevu`ah) is a declaration wherein a person makes a statement obligating himself to perform a positive act or to refrain from doing something, either regarding past events or future ones. A shevu`ah is a requirement on the person, not on the object. An example is, "I will not eat any beans for thirty days."

== Reasons for nedarim ==
Jewish people traditionally have made nedarim for a variety of reasons (some of which are cited below, for added illustration).

=== Personal piety ===
Some nedarim are made out of closeness to God and one's personal dedication. The neder is a way of making a commitment to the Torah and mitzvot and the practice of religion. For example, it is common for a tzaddik who is at a very high level of Torah practice to set new guidelines in his life.

=== Gratitude ===
Nedarim are sometimes made out of gratitude toward God for having been the beneficiary of some form of kindness from God's hand, such as a miracle. For example, one whose life has been saved from near-death might make a new neder as a commitment toward God.

=== Personal improvement ===
One who wishes to improve oneself might make a neder in order to change one's behavior for the better.

=== In times of need ===
Some Jews in times of desperation have made nedarim in hopes that God will answer their prayers in exchange for making a commitment. Essentially, they are "bargaining" with God to have their needs met. For example, a woman who is unable to have children might make a neder to give a certain amount of charity if she is blessed with children.

=== The Nazirite neder ===
A common type of neder is that of the Nazirite. A neder to be a Nazirite for a period of time or sometimes for life for any of the above-described reasons. The Nazirite is required to refrain from consuming alcoholic beverages or grape products, cutting one's hair, or exposure to dead bodies, including one's closest relatives.

== Annulment (hatarat nedarim) ==
Generally, a neder is so strong, that it cannot be broken, and doing so constitutes an aveira (sin). For this reason, it is better not to make a neder at all, than to make a neder and not to keep it. But there are times when halakha permits a neder to be broken.

A neder may be annulled by either a beit din (court of Jewish law, composed of at least three adult men), or singlehandedly by a Talmid chacham (Torah scholar). Either one must ask the individual who originally made the neder why they now wish to have their neder annulled. If a valid argument can be found to release that person from his or her vow, the vow is then cancelled.

=== Nedarim by women ===
According to the Torah, a neder pronounced by a married woman or a female "still living in her father's house" can be "disallowed" by her husband or her father, respectively, if they so choose, but only on the day that they hear the vow. Otherwise, the neder may not be broken. The neder of a widow or a divorcee is also binding once uttered.

The fact that a neder by a woman can so easily be invalidated by a man has been criticized by some contemporary feminists, though others see it as a kindness in Judaism toward women. Under the latter view, in a marriage, it is a means of keeping marital partners in harmony by requiring women to discuss a neder with her husband before taking it on.

=== High Holidays ===
Traditionally, around the High Holidays, all nedarim are annulled in order to free all persons of the liability in the event they are not fulfilled. They first are annulled on the eve of Rosh Hashanah, and then by the recitation of Kol Nidre at the beginning of Yom Kippur.

The common practice is for groups of people, such as family members or a minyan to ask for the annulment together. But one who is unable to do this can rely on the Kol Nidre of the community, which is recited on behalf of all Jews.

Through the High Holiday annulment, the following types of nedarim can be annulled:

- The fulfillment of a voluntary commandment
- A practice beyond Torah commandments in which the plan was to fulfill the neder indefinitely
- A practice that was performed on three consecutive occasions
- A neder to give tzedaka

All nedarim that are annulled must be those one cannot remember having made. If one can remember having made a neder, he must recite it to at least three adult men who are familiar with the laws of the specific type of neder.

==== Procedure ====
The High Holidays annulment has a customary text and procedure which goes as follows. First the individual asks for annulment of every vow or pledge or prohibition that he swore "while I was awake or dreaming", "whether they were matters relating to money, or to the body, or to the soul".... The tribunal responds by reciting three times, "May everything be permitted you, may everything be forgiven you, may everything be allowed you. There does not exist any vow, oath, ... or curse. But there does exist pardon, forgiveness, and atonement." The individual then concludes with a brief statement: "I cancel from this time onward all vows and all oaths ... that I will accept upon myself, whether while awake or in a dream .... from this moment I preemptively regret them and declare of all of them they shall be utterly null and void...."
