= Robert Hausmann =

German cellist (1852–1909)

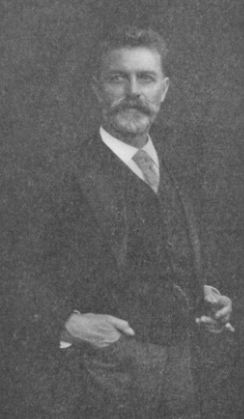
- Born: 13 August 1852; Rottleberode, Kingdom of Prussia
- Died: 18 January 1909 (aged 56); Vienna, Austria-Hungary
- Education: Berlin Hochschule für Musik
- Occupations: Classical cellist; Academic teacher
- Organizations: Joachim Quartet; Berlin Hochschule für Musik

Robert Hausmann (13 August 1852 – 18 January 1909) was a German cellist who premiered important works by Johannes Brahms (including the Double Concerto) and Max Bruch (including Kol Nidrei). He was the cellist for the Joachim Quartet and taught at the Berlin Königliche Hochschule für Musik.

== Biography ==
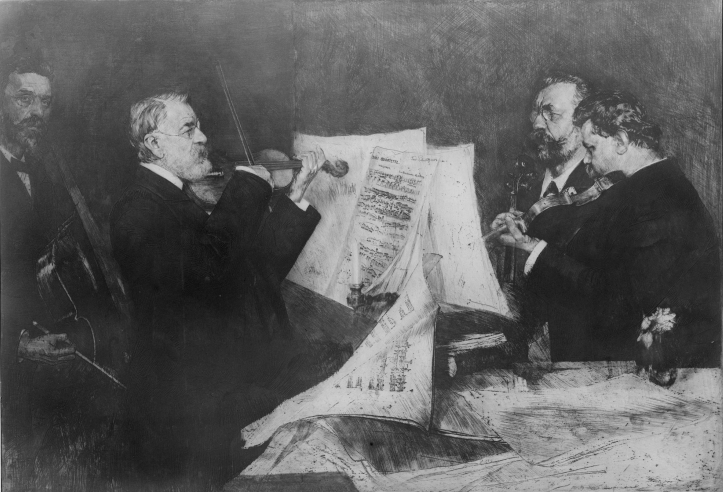
The Joachim Quartet. From left to right: Robert Hausmann (cello), Joseph Joachim (1st violin), Emanuel Wirth (viola) and Karel Halíř (2nd violin)

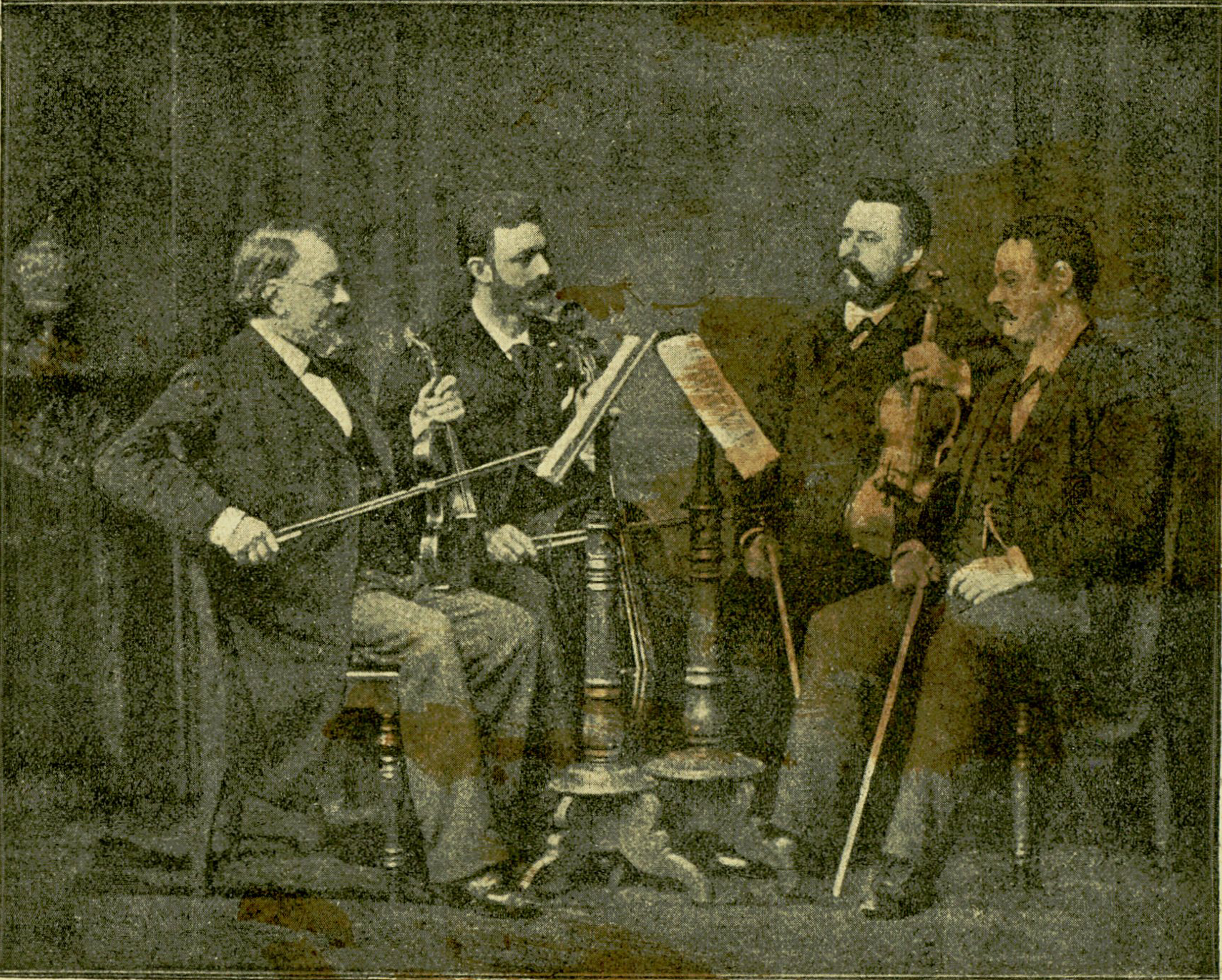
The Joachim Quartet

Robert Hausmann was born in Rottleberode, Harz, in present-day Saxony-Anhalt, Germany. His paternal grandfather, Friedrich Ludwig Hausmann (1782-1859) was a Professor of Mineralogy at the University of Göttingen, and his father Friedrich Ludolf Hausmann (1810-1880) was also involved in mining in the mineral-rich Harz mountains. The Hausmann family had played a prominent role in civic and cultural life of the city of Hanover since the eighteenth century. Robert's great-uncle Bernhard (1784-1873) was an important art collector and amateur violinist whose memoirs, Erinnerungen aus dem 80 jährigen Leben eines hannoverschen Burgers Hannover (1873) provide a detailed account of his many activities during an eventful period in Hanover's history.

Robert entered the Gymnasium in Brunswick at age eight in 1861, where his cello studies proceeded under Theodor Müller, the cellist of the Müller Quartet, one of the earliest professional string quartets in Germany. In 1869 he was one of the first pupils of the Berlin Hochschule für Musik, where he studied under Müller's nephew Wilhelm Müller, under the general guidance of the violinist Joseph Joachim. Joachim introduced him to the great Italian cellist and teacher Carlo Alfredo Piatti, who taught him in London in 1871 and also at his estate at Cadenabbia on Lake Como, Italy.

He then joined the string quartet of Count Hochberg in Silesia from 1871 to 1876, when he was appointed instructor of cello at the Berlin Hochschule. He became principal instructor on the retirement of Wilhelm Müller in 1879, and was named Professor in 1884. From 1879 until Joseph Joachim's death in 1907 he was the cellist of the Joachim Quartet, alongside Joachim himself (1st violin), Heinrich de Ahna (until his death in 1892), replaced by Karel Halíř (2nd violin) and Emanuel Wirth (viola). He was always a very active chamber music player, renowned in Germany, in Europe more generally, and in London. Hausmann performed in Britain almost every year, beginning in 1876, until a month before his death.

In 1879-80, Charles Villiers Stanford wrote a Cello Concerto in D minor for Robert Hausmann. This followed Hausmann's premiering in England Stanford's Cello Sonata, Op. 9, in 1879. It was the first significant British cello sonata. In 1881 Hausmann premiered Max Bruch's Kol Nidrei, Op. 47, which was dedicated to him. Bruch wrote this in response to a longstanding request from Hausmann to write a piece for cello and orchestra to match those he had written for violin and orchestra. Bruch also consulted Hausmann about bowings and other technical aspects. Bruch's Canzone in B-flat, Op. 55, and Vier Stücke, Op. 70, are also dedicated to Hausmann.

Hausmann's most significant association was with Johannes Brahms. After they first played together in 1883, he was a frequent guest among Brahms's circle of friends who had private performances in their homes. The Cello Sonata No. 2 in F major, Op. 99, was both dedicated to and premiered by him in Vienna, with the composer at the piano (14 November 1886). He also popularized the Cello Sonata No. 1 in E minor, Op. 38. In November 1891 he participated in the first private performance, in Meiningen, of the Clarinet Trio in A minor, Op. 114, with Richard Mühlfeld on clarinet and Brahms on piano. The following month they had a triumph with the public premiere in Berlin. Further, Hausmann was part of the Berlin premieres of Brahms's Piano Trio in C minor, Op. 101, the Quintet in G major, Op. 111, and the Clarinet Quintet, Op. 115.

Most importantly, Hausmann and Joseph Joachim were the two soloists for whom Brahms wrote the Double Concerto in A minor, Op. 102, his last orchestral work. Brahms worked with both of them on the piece before its premiere in Wiesbaden on 18 October 1887. The critic Eduard Hanslick wrote that Hausmann was "in no way inferior to Joachim." As part of the Joachim Quartet, Hausmann championed all of Brahms's chamber music for strings, which were regularly featured on the Quartet's Berlin concert series for over thirty years. Besides the Quartet, Hausmann was a founding member of a piano trio group, made up of his colleagues at the Hochschule, Heinrich de Ahna (with Emanuel Wirth replacing de Ahna after he died in 1892) and the pianist Heinrich Barth. They started a subscription concert series in Berlin that lasted from 1878 until 1907. Their concert season was similar to the Quartet's, starting in October and ending in March. Their first years of playing were in the Singakademie. However, in 1889 they started playing "popular chamber music evenings" in the much larger Philharmonie, where they usually filled the 2000-plus seats.

In 1894 Hausmann married Helene von Maybach, daughter of the Prussian Minister of Commerce Albert von Maybach. They had two children: Luise (b. 1895) and Friedrich Georg (b. 1900), who also became a musician.

Hausmann published editions of the Bach Cello Suites and the Mendelssohn Cello Sonatas and Variations Concertantes in D major, Op. 17; he also made cello and piano arrangements of Schumann's Märchenbilder, Op. 113 (originally for viola and piano), and the Cello Concerto by Bernhard Molique.

His students included Friedrich Koch (teacher of Boris Blacher and Paul Kletzki), Wallingford Riegger, Philipp Roth, Percy Such, Hugo Dechert, Otto Lüdemann, Agustín Rubio, Lucy Campbell, Arthur Williams, and others. See: List of music students by teacher: G to J#Robert Hausmann.

He played a fine Stradivarius cello from 1724, which is still known as the "Hausmann" Strad. He acquired it from his great uncle's son, the cello virtuoso and chamber music specialist George Hausmann, who had settled in Britain. It was later owned by the Russian master Edmund Kurtz (principal cello of the Chicago Symphony Orchestra).

Robert Hausmann died in Vienna in January 1909, aged 56, after playing a recital of Beethoven's Cello Sonatas with Marie Baumeyer in Graz the previous evening. Donald Tovey had played chamber music with Joachim and Hausmann during their last years, and his Elegiac Variations for cello and piano, Op. 10, were written in memory of Hausmann.

== Sources ==
- Grove's Dictionary of Music and Musicians, 5th ed., 1954, Eric Blom ed.
