= Frances Terry =

American composer (1884–1965)

Frances Terry (1884–1965) was an American composer.

A native of East Windsor, Connecticut, Terry undertook composition lessons with Louis Victor Saar and Mr. and Mrs. Edmund Severn, among others. She was active as a piano instructor in New York City and Passaic, New Jersey, later moving to Northampton, Massachusetts. Much of her output consists of works for piano, but she composed a violin sonata and a theme and variations for string quartet as well; the sonata received a prize from the Society for the Publication of American Music in 1931. Stylistically, her work has been described as "Mildly 20th-century with strong expressive qualities and rich harmonies".
