= Heinrich de Ahna =

Austrian classical violinist

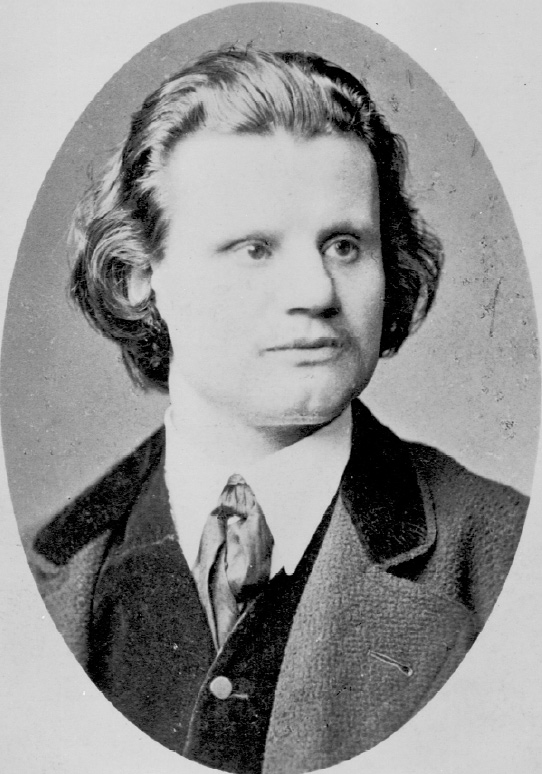
Heinrich de Ahna

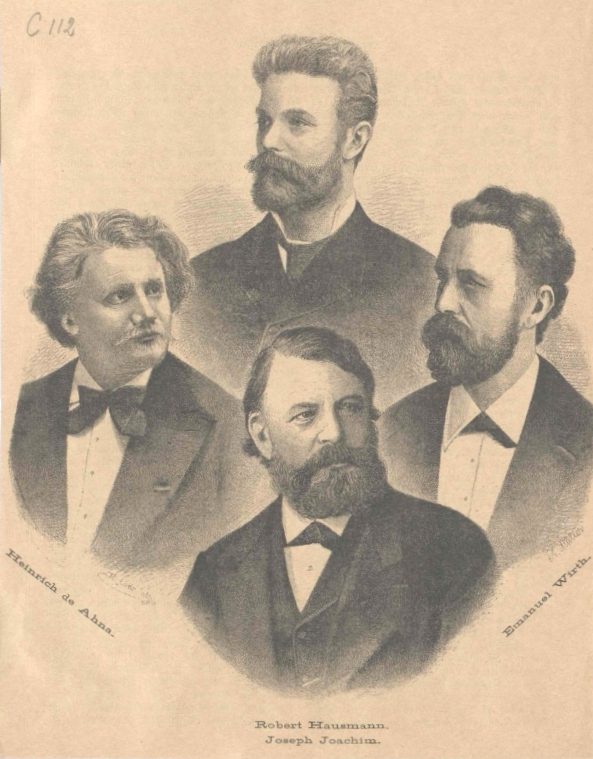
The Joachim Quartet in 1884. Left Heinrich de Ahna, above: Hausmann, right: Wirth, below Joseph Joachim

Heinrich de Ahna (22 June 1832 – 1 November 1892) was an Austrian violinist.

== Life and career ==
Ahna, who was born in Vienna probably in 1832 (other sources give his year of birth as 1834 or 1835), received violin lessons from the age of seven. At the age of ten, he became a pupil of Joseph Mayseder, later receiving lessons from Mildner (1812–1865) in Prague. His first public appearance as a soloist was in 1846 at the Vienna Opera House. With his father, the boy undertook concert tours through Germany and England. In 1849, Ernest II, Duke of Saxe-Coburg and Gotha awarded him the title of "chamber virtuoso". In 1851, Ahna joined the Austrian army, soon became an officer and in 1859 took part in the Second Italian War of Independence as Oberleutnant.

From 1863 to 1869, he was a lecturer at the Stern Conservatory.

After successful art tours through Holland and Germany, Ahna became a member of the royal orchestra in Berlin in 1862 and succeeded the first concertmaster Hubert Ries after his retirement in 1869. He also held a violin professorship at the Royal Academy of Music.

Together with Joseph Joachim (1st violin), Emanuel Wirth (viola) and Robert Hausmann (violoncello), de Ahna formed the famous Joachim String Quartet from 1879.

Ahna was considered one of the best violinists of his time. His playing was praised for its "blooming, soul-saturated tone, perfect, never-failing technique, hair-sharp intonation and artistic, noble and stylish conception".

Ahna died in Berlin in 1890 at the age of 60 and, like his sister Eleonore who died at an early age, was buried in the St. Hedwig cemetery in the Liesenstraße there. The tomb has not been preserved.
