= Arthur Morris (U.S. Army officer) =

United States Army officer

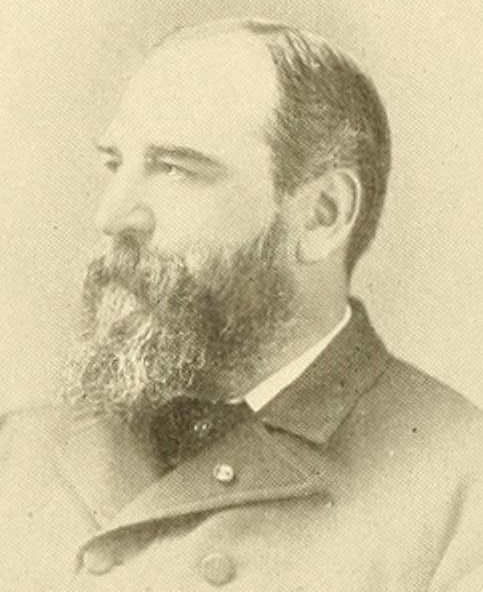
- From 1892's Officers of the Army and Navy (Regular) Who Served in the Civil War

9th Commander of the Department of Alaska
- In office March 5, 1877 – June 14, 1877
- President: Rutherford B. Hayes
- Preceded by: John Mendenhall
- Succeeded by: Montgomery P. Berry

Personal details
- Born: November 9, 1843
- Died: September 26, 1892 (aged 48)

Military service
- Allegiance: United States
- Branch/service: Union Army
- Rank: Brevet Major
- Commands: 4th Artillery Regiment
- Battles/wars: American Civil War; Battle of White Oak Swamp; Battle of Antietam

Arthur Morris (9 November 1843 – 26 September 1892) was an officer in the United States Army who served as the ninth commander of the Department of Alaska, from March 5, 1877, to June 14, 1877.

Morris was commissioned as a second lieutenant of the 4th Artillery Regiment in March 1862. He received two brevets for gallantry and meritorious service at the Battles of White Oak Swamp and Antietam, and was promoted to first lieutenant in November 1863.

Morris was promoted to captain in January 1877, and was the last Army officer to command the Department of Alaska. He retired in October 1887, and received a brevet promotion to major in February 1890.
