= Henry Charles DeAhna =

American politician (1823–1891)

11th Commander of the Department of Alaska
- In office August 14, 1877 – March 26, 1878
- President: Rutherford B. Hayes
- Preceded by: Montgomery P. Berry
- Succeeded by: M. D. Ball

Henry Charles DeAhna (born 1823, died 1891) was a collector of customs for the United States Department of the Treasury, and from August 14, 1877, to March 26, 1878, was the highest-ranking federal official in the Department of Alaska, making him the de facto governor of the territory.
