= Natural scale =

Natural scale may refer to:

== Music ==
- 5-limit diatonic major scale
- Natural minor scale, as opposed to harmonic and melodic
- C major and A minor, the diatonic scale in keys with no sharps or flats
- Harmonic series (music), the series of pitches produced by instruments such as the natural horn and trumpet
- The major scale in Pythagorean tuning, formed from a succession of fifths starting one below the tonic
- On many wind instruments, the scale most easily produced by lifting the fingers one at a time from bottom to top

== Other ==
- Nondimensionalization, the removal of units from a mathematical equation
