= Philipp Roth =

German cellist (1853–1898)

Philipp Roth (25 October 1853 – 9 June 1898) was a German cellist whose career centered in Berlin. He is best known for his pedagogical texts on cello performance and repertoire.

== Life and career ==
Roth was born at Tarnowitz in Prussian Silesia on 25 October 1853. He began violin at age eight, switching to cello at twelve, all the while playing alongside his brothers in a quartet. After study with Wilhelm Müller, he studied under the renowned cellist Robert Hausmann at the Königliche Hochschule für Musik from 1876 to 1878. He later received chamber and orchestral playing lessons from Joseph Joachim and studied composition with both Wilhelm Taubert and Woldemar Bargiel.

Roth's career centered on Berlin, aside from an concert tour stint in Russia. German musicologist Wilhelm Joseph von Wasielewski noted that Roth "has devoted his powers chiefly to teaching," and that he "has also been zealous in the publication of cello literature." He published a bibliography of cello repertoire, Führer Durch die Violoncell-Litteratur, in 1890.

Roth died in Berlin on 9 June 1898.
