= Victoria Interrante =

American computer scientist

Victoria Lynn Interrante is an American computer scientist specializing in computer graphics, scientific computing, and virtual environments. She is a professor of computer science and engineering at the University of Minnesota, a founder of the annual ACM Symposium on Applied Perception in Graphics and Visualization, and co-editor-in-chief of the journal ACM Transactions on Applied Perception.

== Education and career ==
Interrante is a 1984 graduate of the University of Massachusetts Boston. After earning a master's degree in 1986 at the University of California, Los Angeles, working with Jacques Vidal on computer graphics modeling of breaking waves, she completed a Ph.D. in 1996 at the University of North Carolina at Chapel Hill. Her doctoral dissertation, Illustrating Transparency: Communicating the 3D Shape of Layered Transparent Surfaces via Texture, was co-advised by Henry Fuchs and Stephen Pizer.

After postdoctoral research at NASA's Langley Research Center, on the visualization of fluid dynamics, she joined the University of Minnesota faculty in 1998.

She was the founding co-chair of the ACM Symposium on Applied Perception in Graphics and Visualization, in 2004. She became co-editor-in-chief of the journal ACM Transactions on Applied Perception in 2015.

== Recognition ==
Interrante was a 1999 recipient of the Presidential Early Career Award for Scientists and Engineers. In 2020, the Visualization & Graphics Technical Committee of the IEEE Computer Society gave Interrante their Virtual Reality Career Award.
