= Ahna Skop =

American geneticist (born 1972)

- Born: 1972; New Haven, Connecticut
- Occupation: Professor of Genetics

Academic background
- Education: Syracuse University: B.S. Biology (1994) University of Wisconsin-Madison: Ph.D. Cellular and Molecular Biology (2000) UC Berkeley: Post Doctorate Work
- Alma mater: University of Wisconsin Madison
- Thesis: Studies on cleavage plane orientation and daughter cell separation in Caenorhabditis elegans (2000)
- Doctoral advisor: John G. White
- Other advisors: Barbara Meyer, Rebecca Heald

Academic work
- Discipline: Cell Biologist
- Sub-discipline: Artist
- Institutions: University of Wisconsin-Madison

Ahna Renee Skop is an American geneticist, artist, and a professor at the University of Wisconsin–Madison. She is known for her research on the mechanisms underlying asymmetric cell division, particularly the importance of the midbody in this process.

== Education ==
Skop grew up in New Haven, Connecticut and Fort Thomas, Kentucky. She earned a Bachelor of Science in biology and a minor in Ceramics from Syracuse University and before completing her Ph.D. in cellular and molecular biology at the University of Wisconsin-Madison. She did postdoctoral work at the University of California, Berkeley in the laboratories of Rebecca Heald, Barbara Meyer and John Yates (Scripps), after which she returned to the University of Wisconsin–Madison where, as of 2018, she is a full professor of genetics.

== Career ==
Skop is known for her work on Caenorhabditis elegans, a free-living worm, and mammalian tissue culture cells where she has studied the mechanisms that control cell division. Her early work was on the final stages of cell division in C. elegans, and she identified the proteins in the midbody that are involved in cell division. Her more recent work examines defects that could be caused by problems in the mammalian midbody, where she has shown that midbody is an organelle that harbors translationally active RNA.

As a faculty member, Skop guided the creation of a diversity committee within the genetics department in the College of Agriculture and Life Sciences at the University of Madison-Wisconsin and led the creation of their STEM Diversity Network.

Skop collaborated with undergraduate students Elif Kurt and Caitlin Marks to release Genetics Reflections: A coloring book in 2020.

== Artistic career ==
Skop has curated a scientific art show at the International C. elegans meeting, the "Worm Art Show", and she worked with a Madison, Wisconsin artist, Angela Johnson to create an art installation called "Genetic Reflections".

== Select publications ==
- Jung, G. I.; Londoño-Vásquez, D.; Park, S.; Skop, A. R.; Balboula, A. Z.; Schindler, K. (2023). "An oocyte meiotic midbody cap is required for developmental competence in mice". Nature Communications. 14 (1): 7419. Bibcode:2023NatCo..14.7419J. doi:10.1038/s41467-023-43288-x. PMC 10654508. PMID 37973997.
- Park, S; Patel, SA; Torr, EE; Dureke, AN; McIntyre, AM; Skop, AR (2023). "A protocol for isolating and imaging large extracellular vesicles or midbody remnants from mammalian cell culture". STAR Protoc. 4 102562. doi:10.1016/j.xpro.2023.102562. PMC 10500451. PMID 37690025.
- Park, S; Dahn, R; Kurt, E; Presle, A; VanDenHeuvel, K; Moravec, C; Jambhekar, A; Olukoga, O; Shepherd, J; Echard, A; Blower, M; Skop, AR (2023). "The mammalian midbody and midbody remnant are assembly sites for RNA and localized translation". Dev Cell. 58: 1917–1932.e6. doi:10.1016/j.devcel.2023.07.009. PMC 10592306. PMID 37552987.
- Skop, Ahna R.; Bergmann, Dominique; Mohler, William A.; White, John G. (2001-05-15). "Completion of cytokinesis in C. elegans requires a brefeldin A-sensitive membrane accumulation at the cleavage furrow apex". Current Biology. 11 (10): 735–746. Bibcode:2001CBio...11..735S. doi:10.1016/S0960-9822(01)00231-7. ISSN 0960-9822. PMC 3733387. PMID 11378383.
- Skop, Ahna R.; Liu, Hongbin; Yates, John; Meyer, Barbara J.; Heald, Rebecca (2004-07-02). "Dissection of the Mammalian Midbody Proteome Reveals Conserved Cytokinesis Mechanisms". Science. 305 (5680): 61–66. Bibcode:2004Sci...305...61S. doi:10.1126/science.1097931. ISSN 0036-8075. PMC 3679889. PMID 15166316.
- Skop, Ahna R.; White, John G. (1998-10-08). "The dynactin complex is required for cleavage plane specification in early Caenorhabditis elegans embryos". Current Biology. 8 (20): 1110–1117. Bibcode:1998CBio....8.1110S. doi:10.1016/S0960-9822(98)70465-8. ISSN 0960-9822. PMC 3690630. PMID 9778526.
- Thompson, Heather M.; Skop, Ahna R.; Euteneuer, Ursula; Meyer, Barbara J.; McNiven, Mark A. (2002-12-23). "The Large GTPase Dynamin Associates with the Spindle Midzone and Is Required for Cytokinesis". Current Biology. 12 (24): 2111–2117. Bibcode:2002CBio...12.2111T. doi:10.1016/S0960-9822(02)01390-8. ISSN 0960-9822. PMC 3690653. PMID 12498685.
- Otegui, Marisa S.; Verbrugghe, Koen J.; Skop, Ahna R. (2005-08-01). "Midbodies and phragmoplasts: analogous structures involved in cytokinesis". Trends in Cell Biology. 15 (8): 404–413. doi:10.1016/j.tcb.2005.06.003. ISSN 0962-8924. PMC 3677513. PMID 16009554.

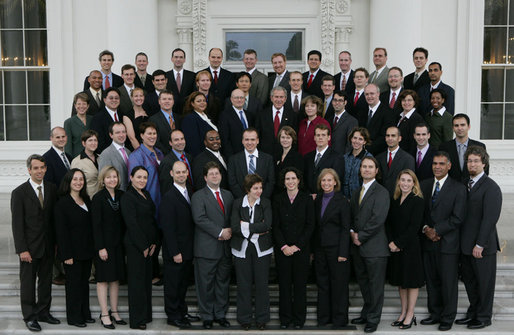
President Bush with the Skop and other recipients of the 2006 Presidential Early Career Awards for Scientists and Engineers

== Honors and awards ==
- 2006 Presidential Early Career Award for Scientists and Engineers, National Science Foundation
- 2009 Honorary Doctorate of Science, College of Saint Benedict,
- 2015 Kavli Fellowship, National Academy of Sciences
- 2016 Chancellor's Inclusive Excellence Award, University of Wisconsin-Madison
- 2018 Prize for Excellence in Inclusivity, American Society for Cell Biology, the first time this prize was given.
- 2019 IF/THEN Ambassador, American Association for the Advancement of Science
- 2019-20 Outstanding Women of Color, University of Wisconsin-Madison
- 2022 Vilas Faculty Mid-Career Investigator award, University of Wisconsin–Madison
- 2024 Fellows Award, Wisconsin Academy of Sciences, Arts & Letters
