= Eleonore de Ahna =

German soprano

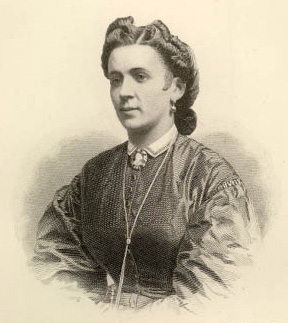
- Eleonore de Ahna, etching by August Weger
- Born: 8 January 1838; Vienna
- Died: 10 May 1865 (aged 27); Berlin
- Burial place: Alter Domfriedhof der St.-Hedwigs-Gemeinde cemetery
- Other name: Leonore de Ahna
- Occupation: operatic soprano/mezzo-soprano
- Years active: 1859–1865

Eleonore de Ahna (8 January 1838 – 10 May 1865), occasionally also Leonore de Ahna, was a German operatic soprano/mezzo-soprano.

== Life ==
Born in Vienna, Ahna was the daughter of a Bavarian first lieutenant, who later worked as a factory owner. Her mother was born Freiin von Odelga. Her brother was the violinist Heinrich de Ahna. Her niece, the singer Pauline de Ahna, married the composer Richard Strauss.

Although Ahna had no plans to go to the theatre at first, the deterioration of her parents' financial circumstances forced her to turn to this profession. She received her vocal training from Eduard Mantius (1806–1874). She made her debut on 2 September 1859 at the Staatsoper Unter den Linden in Berlin in the title role of Donizetti's opera Lucrezia Borgia and soon became popular with the public. On 1 January 1860 she received a permanent engagement. She gave Fidès in Meyerbeer's Le prophète, Ortrud in Wagner's Lohengrin, Elisabeth in Tannhäuser and other roles in Le nozze di Figaro, Don Juan, Rigoletto and in Orfeo ed Euridice. She also gave guest performances outside Berlin.

Ahna died in Berlin at the age of 27 after an inner suffering that first forced her to interrupt her work until she finally completely withdrew from the stage. She was buried in the Alter Domfriedhof der St.-Hedwigs-Gemeinde cemetery. Her grave is decorated with a marble angel by Julius Franz.
