= Michael S. Landy =

- Education: University of Michigan
- Title: Professor
- Scientific career
- Fields: Neuroscience, Psychology
- Workplaces: New York University

Michael S. Landy is Professor of Psychology and Neural Science at New York University. He is known for his research on visual perception and movement planning.

== Biography ==
Landy attended college at Columbia University and earned a B.S. in 1974 in Electrical Engineering and Computer Science. Subsequently, Landy went to the University of Michigan where he received a M.S. in 1976 and a Ph.D in 1981 in Computer and Communication Sciences. His doctoral research (conducted under the supervision of John Henry Holland) used neural network models of visual learning. After receiving his doctorate, he began working at New York University, where he subsequently became a faculty member in 1984.

== Research ==
Landy's research uses computational models to describe the human visual system, including perception of texture, orientation, stereopsis, and motion. He also researches decision-making and motor planning.

Landy is best known for his work on cue combination. Cue combination is the process by which the brain combines information from multiple sensory cues (e.g., vision and touch) in order to obtain a more accurate representation of the environment.

He has also done research into the perception of visual texture and orientation. Much of his work uses a normative Bayesian framework of perception, which posits that human behavior approximates Bayesian inference

In a video interview with Science Friday, Landy explains the science behind an art piece that alters the observer's perception of gravity. The piece offers a strong example of how our perception is strongly influenced by previous experiences.
