= Edmund Severn =

American composer and violinist

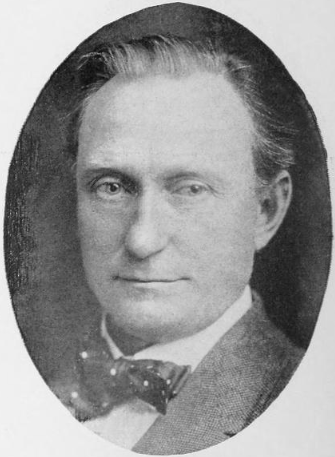
- Born: December 10, 1862; Nottingham, England
- Died: May 14, 1942 (aged 79); Melrose, Massachusetts, US
- Occupations: Composer, violinist
- Spouse: Marion Woodsum

Edmund Severn (December 10, 1862 – May 14, 1942) was an English-American composer and violinist.

== Biography ==
Born in Nottingham, he moved to the United States at four, settling in Hartford, Connecticut and studying violin with his father; he later studied music in Berlin. There he studied the Joachim bowing technique. As a composer, he wrote mainly orchestral music, as well as many pieces for his instrument, including a concerto; he also wrote three string quartets. He died at his home in Melrose, Massachusetts on May 14, 1942. His most famous work is his "Polish Dance" for violin and piano, composed in 1918.

Edmund Severn's work is often reflective of folk, nationalist and neoclassical genres of music. Severn continued composing into the mid-20th century until he died in 1942.

Severn's pupils included the composer Frances Terry.
