= Double Concerto (Brahms) =

1887 orchestral work by Johannes Brahms

- by Johannes Brahms
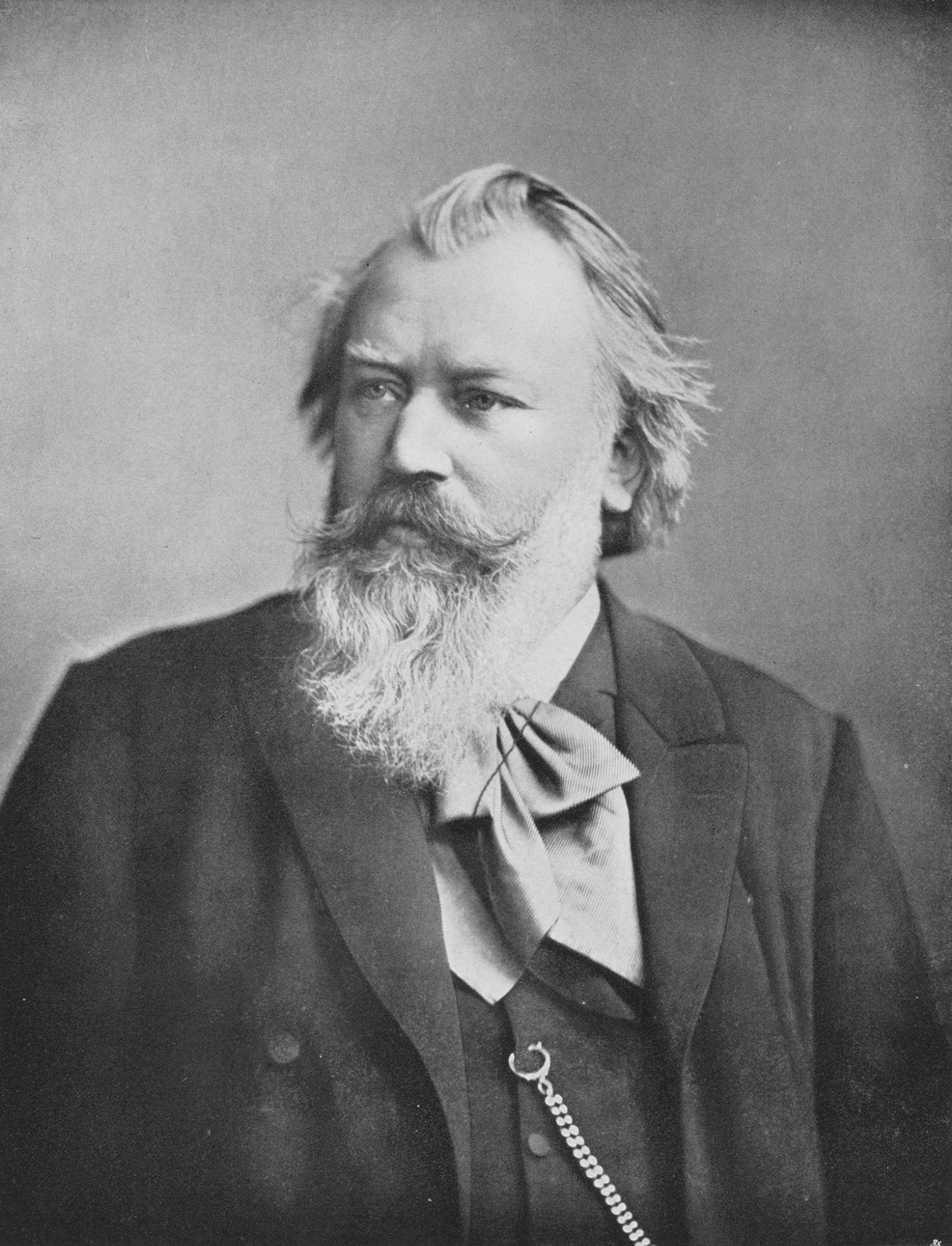
- The composer in 1889
- Key: A minor
- Opus: 102
- Composed: 1887
- Performed: 18 October 1887: Cologne
- Movements: three
- Scoring: violin; cello; orchestra

The Double Concerto in A minor, Op. 102, by Johannes Brahms is a concerto for violin, cello and orchestra, composed in 1887 as his last work for orchestra.

== Origin of the work ==
The Double Concerto was Brahms' final work for orchestra. It was composed in the summer of 1887, and first performed on 18 October of that year at the Gürzenich in Cologne. Brahms approached the project with anxiety over writing for instruments that were not his own. He wrote it for the cellist Robert Hausmann, a frequent chamber music collaborator, and his old but estranged friend, the violinist Joseph Joachim. The concerto was, in part, a gesture of reconciliation towards Joachim, after their long friendship had ruptured following Joachim's divorce from his wife Amalie. (Brahms had sided with Amalie in the dispute.)

The concerto makes use of the musical motif A–E–F, a permutation of F–A–E, which stood for a personal motto of Joachim, Frei aber einsam ("free but lonely"). Thirty-four years earlier, Brahms had been involved in a collaborative work using the F-A-E motif in tribute to Joachim: the F-A-E Sonata of 1853.

== Structure ==
External audio
- Performed by Julia Fischer and Daniel Müller-Schott with the Netherlands Philharmonic Orchestra under Yakov Kreizberg
- I. Allegro
- II. Andante
- III. Vivace non troppo

The composition consists of three movements in the fast–slow–fast pattern typical of classical instrumental concerti:

1. Allegro (A minor)
2. Andante (D major)
3. Vivace non troppo (A minor → A major)

== Scoring ==
The orchestra consists of 2 flutes, 2 oboes, 2 clarinets, 2 bassoons, 4 horns, 2 trumpets, timpani and strings.

== Performance and reception ==
Joachim and Hausmann performed the concerto, with Brahms at the podium, several times in its initial 1887–88 season, and Brahms gave the manuscript to Joachim, with the inscription "To him for whom it was written." Clara Schumann reacted unfavourably to the concerto, considering the work "not brilliant for the instruments". Richard Specht also thought critically of the concerto, describing it as "one of Brahms' most inapproachable and joyless compositions". Brahms had sketched a second concerto for violin and cello but destroyed his notes in the wake of its cold reception. Later critics have warmed to it: Donald Tovey wrote of the concerto as having "vast and sweeping humour". Its performance requires two brilliant and equally matched soloists.

== Scholarly discussion ==
Richard Cohn has included the first movement of this concerto in his discussions of triadic progressions from a Neo-Riemannian perspective. Cohn has also analysed such progressions mathematically. Cohn notes several progressions that divide the octave equally into three parts, and which can be analyzed using the triadic transformations proposed by Hugo Riemann.

== Discography ==
I. Allegro

II. Andante

III. Vivace non troppo
Performed by the Skidmore College Orchestra

- Jacques Thibaud and Pablo Casals, Orquestra Pau Casals cond. Alfred Cortot (1929).
- Jascha Heifetz and Emanuel Feuermann, Philadelphia Orchestra cond. Eugene Ormandy (1939).
- Mischa Mischakoff and Frank Miller, NBC Symphony Orchestra cond. Arturo Toscanini (live radio and TV broadcast 1948).
- Adolf Busch and Herman Busch, French National Radio Orchestra cond. Paul Kletzki (live Strasbourg 1949).
- Georg Kulenkampff and Enrico Mainardi, Orchestre de la Suisse Romande cond. Carl Schuricht (1947).
- Willi Boskovsky and Emanuel Brabec, Vienna Philharmonic Orchestra cond. Wilhelm Furtwängler (1950 live recording).
- Nathan Milstein and Gregor Piatigorsky, Philadelphia Robin Hood Dell Orchestra cond. Fritz Reiner (1951).
- Jean Fournier and Antonio Janigro, Vienna State Opera Orchestra cond. Hermann Scherchen (1952).
- Gioconda de Vito and Amadeo Baldovino, Philharmonia Orchestra cond. Rudolf Schwarz (1952).
- David Oistrakh and Pierre Fournier, Philharmonia Orchestra cond. Alceo Galliera (1956).
- Isaac Stern and Leonard Rose, Philharmonic Symphony Orchestra of New York cond. Bruno Walter (1956).
- Zino Francescatti and Samuel Mayes, Boston Symphony Orchestra cond. Charles Munch (April 1956 live recording).
- Zino Francescatti and Pierre Fournier, Columbia Symphony Orchestra cond. Bruno Walter (1960).
- Zino Francescatti and Pierre Fournier, BBC Symphony Orchestra cond. Sir Malcolm Sargent (date of recording: 30/08/1955).
- Wolfgang Schneiderhan and Enrico Mainardi, Vienna Philharmonic Orchestra cond. Karl Böhm (date of recording: 08/25/1957).
- Jascha Heifetz and Gregor Piatigorsky, RCA Victor Symphony Orchestra cond. Alfred Wallenstein (1961).
- Salvatore Accardo and Siegfried Palm, Orchestra Sinfonica di Roma della RTV Italiana cond Bruno Maderna (live 1961 Milan).
- Wolfgang Schneiderhan and János Starker, Berlin Radio Symphony Orchestra cond. Ferenc Fricsay (1962).
- Alfredo Campoli and André Navarra, Hallé Orchestra cond. John Barbirolli (1963).
- Josef Suk and André Navarra, Czech Philharmonic Orchestra cond. Karel Ančerl (c.1963).
- David Oistrakh and Mstislav Rostropovich, Moscow Philharmonic Orchestra cond. Kirill Kondrashin (live 1963).
- David Oistrakh and Mstislav Rostropovich, Cleveland Orchestra cond. George Szell (1970).
- Christian Ferras and Paul Tortelier, Philharmonia Orchestra cond. Paul Kletzki (1964).
- Yehudi Menuhin and Maurice Gendron, London Symphony Orchestra cond. István Kertész (Bath Festival 1964).
- Yehudi Menuhin and Leslie Parnas, Casals Festival Orchestra cond. Pablo Casals (1969).
- Henryk Szeryng and János Starker, Royal Concertgebouw Orchestra cond. Bernard Haitink (1971).
- Yan Pascal Tortelier and Paul Tortelier, BBC Symphony Orchestra cond. John Pritchard (1974).
- Salvatore Accardo and Heinrich Schiff, Gewandhausorchester Leipzig cond. Kurt Masur (1979)
- Itzhak Perlman and Mstislav Rostropovich, Concertgebouw Orchestra, cond. Bernard Haitink (1980).
- Anne-Sophie Mutter and Antônio Meneses, Berlin Philharmonic Orchestra cond. Herbert von Karajan (1983).
- Emmy Verhey and János Starker, Amsterdam Philharmonic Orchestra (nl) cond. Arpad Joó (1983).
- Gidon Kremer and Mischa Maisky, Vienna Philharmonic Orchestra cond. Leonard Bernstein (1984).
- Yehudi Menuhin and Paul Tortelier, London Philharmonic Orchestra cond. Paavo Berglund (1984).
- Isaac Stern and Yo-Yo Ma, Chicago Symphony Orchestra cond. Claudio Abbado (1988).
- Raphael Wallfisch and Lydia Mordkovitch (violin), London Symphony Orchestra, Neeme Järvi. Label Chandos (1989).
- Ilya Kaler and Maria Kliegel, National Symphony Orchestra of Ireland cond. Andrew Constantine (1995).
- Gidon Kremer and Clemens Hagen, Royal Concertgebouw Orchestra cond. Nikolaus Harnoncourt (1997).
- Itzhak Perlman and Yo-Yo Ma, Chicago Symphony Orchestra cond. Daniel Barenboim (1997).
- Gil Shaham and Jian Wang, Berliner Philharmoniker cond. Claudio Abbado (2002).
- Julia Fischer and Daniel Müller-Schott, Netherlands Philharmonic Orchestra cond. Yakov Kreizberg (2007).
- Renaud Capuçon and Gautier Capuçon, Gustav Mahler Jugendorchester cond. Myung-Whun Chung (2007).
- Vadim Repin and Truls Mørk, Leipzig Gewandhaus Orchestra cond. Riccardo Chailly (2009).
- Antje Weithaas and Maximilian Hornung, NDR Radiophilharmonie cond. Andrew Manze (2019).
