= List of compositions by Donald Tovey =

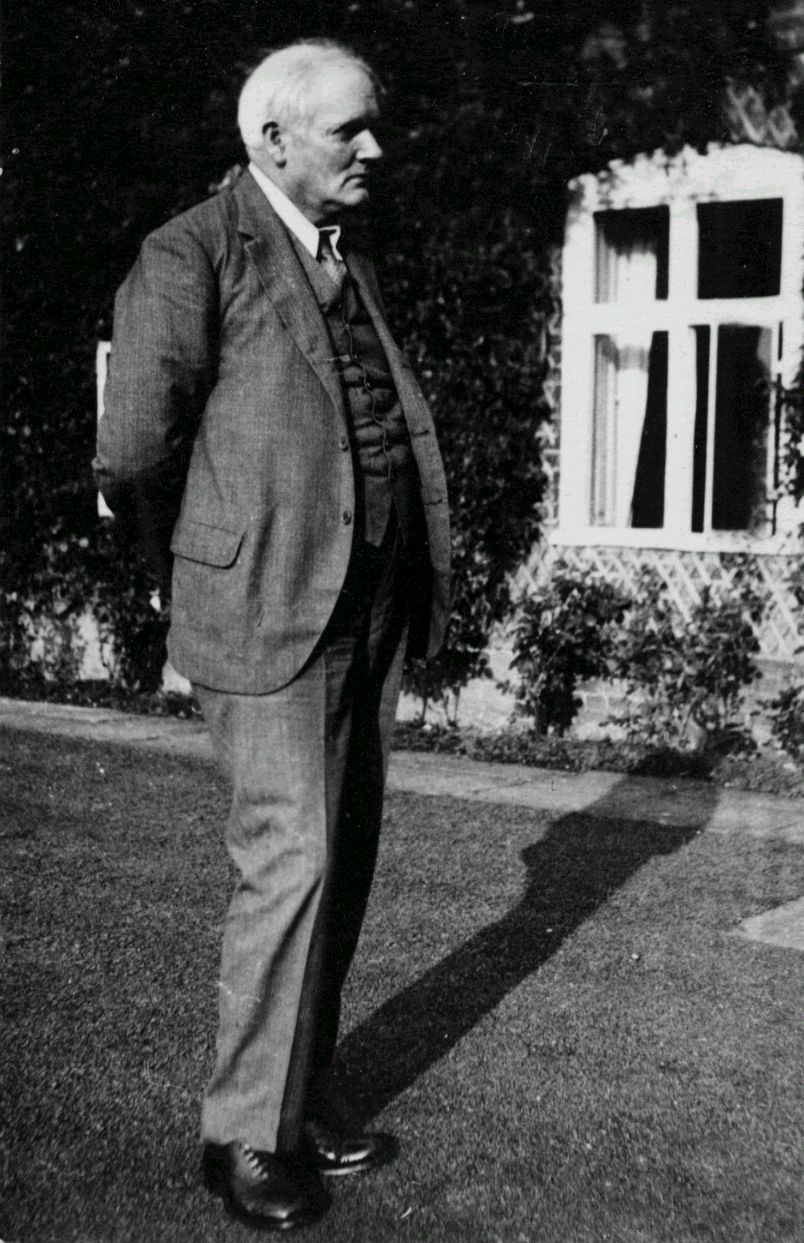
Tovey, c. 1938

This is a list of compositions by Donald Tovey.

== Piano ==
=== Piano solo ===
- Bagatelles
- Allegro and Andante
- Variations on an Original Theme
- Passacaglia

=== Two pianos ===
- Balliol Dances

== Instrument solo ==
- Sonata eroica for Violin solo, Op. 29
- Sonata for Cello solo, Op. 30

== Chamber music ==
=== Violin and piano ===
- Violin Sonata

=== Cello and piano ===
- Cello Sonata in F major, Op. 4
- Elegiac Variations for Cello and Piano, Op. 25 (written in tribute to Robert Hausmann)

=== Piano trio ===
- Piano Trio in B minor, Op. 1
- Piano Trio in D major, Op. 27
- Piano Trio in C minor, Op. 8, "Style tragique"

=== Piano quartet ===
- Piano Quartet in E minor, Op. 12

=== Piano quintet ===
- Piano Quintet in C major, Op. 6

=== String quartet ===
- Aria and Variations for String Quartet, Op. 11
- String Quartet in G major, Op. 23
- String Quartet in D major, Op. 24

=== Other ===
- Trio for Clarinet, Horn and Piano, Op. 8
- Trio for Violin, English Horn and Piano, Op. 14
- Clarinet Sonata in B flat, Op. 16
- Variations on a theme by Gluck for Flute and String Quartet, Op. 28
- Divertimento for Oboe and Piano
- Sonata for 2 Cellos

== Orchestral ==
=== Symphonies ===
- Symphony in D, Op. 32

=== Piano and orchestra ===
- Piano Concerto in A major, Op. 15

=== Cello and orchestra ===
- Cello Concerto in C major, Op. 40

=== Other ===
- Air for String Orchestra
- National March for the Sultan of Zanzibar for Orchestra

== Opera ==
- The Bride of Dionysus.

== Choral music ==
- 25 Rounds, Op. 5
- Anthems for unaccompanied choir
- Agnus Dei
- A Lyke Wake Dirge
  - The Mad Maid's Song (in 3 parts, words Robert Herrick) (1920)
- On May Morning
- The Lord is my Shepherd

== Songs ==
- The Bad Child's Book of Beasts (words Hilaire Belloc, c. 1899)
- Six Songs for a low voice (Set 1), Op. 2 (c. 1905)
- Six Songs for a low voice (Set 2), Op. 3 (c. 1905)
- There be none of Beauty's Daughters (1926)
- My True Love Hath my Heart (1937)
