= Sonata in C major for piano four-hands, D 812 (Schubert) =

1824 piano sonata by Franz Schubert

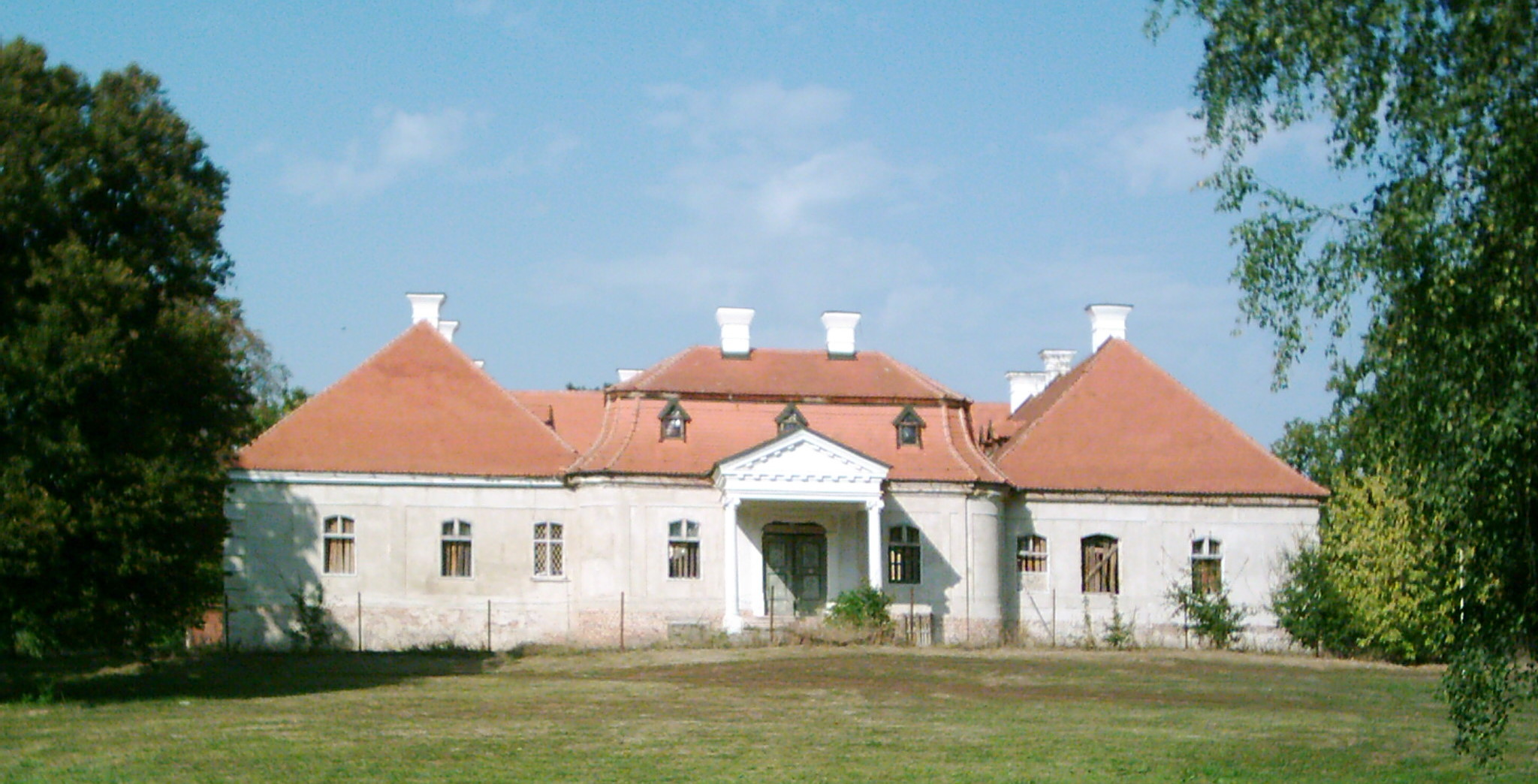
Esterházy estate at Želiezovce, where Schubert wrote his Sonata in C major for piano four-hands

Franz Schubert wrote his Sonata in C major for piano four-hands, D 812, in June 1824 during his second stay at the Esterházy estate in Želiezovce. The extended work, in four movements, has a performance time of around 40 to 45 minutes. It was published as Grand Duo, Op. 140, in 1837, nine years after the composer's death.

Robert Schumann saw Beethoven's influence in the work, and thought of it as the piano version of a symphony. Joseph Joachim's orchestration of the work was performed from the 19th to the 21st century. From the second half of the 20th century the Sonata was however more readily appreciated as a piano piece with orchestral effects, like many other piano works by Schubert, than as a symphony in disguise.

== History ==
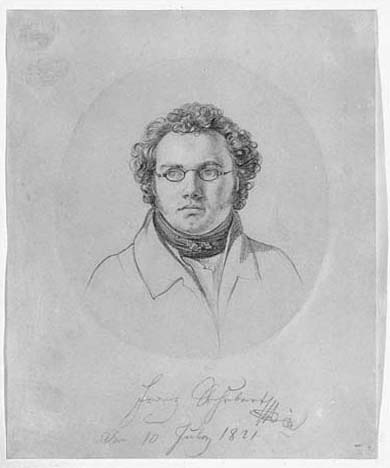
Schubert in 1821, drawing by Joseph Kupelwieser.

In 1818 Count János Károly Esterházy de Galántha (German: Johann Karl Esterházy von Galánta) hired Schubert as music teacher for his daughters, Mária Terezia and Karoline, when the family was staying at their summer residence in Zseliz, at that time in rural Hungary. Schubert was in Zseliz from 7 July to 19 November, around which time he wrote his Sonata in B♭ major for piano four-hands, D 617. In May 1822, Schubert dedicated his Op. 8, a collection of four songs (D 702, 516, 586 and 539), to Count János Károly. Later that year the composer contracted syphilis, suffering from the condition for the largest part of 1823 and partially recovering towards the end of the year. His Op. 30, the B♭ major piano duet Sonata of 1818, was published in December. A few months later symptoms of his illness regained momentum. In a letter of 31 March to his friend Leopold Kupelwieser, he describes the failure of his latest opera projects and voices his despair over his health situation. In the letter he also mentions his latest chamber music compositions (the String Quartets D 804 and 810, and the Octet D 803), and his plan to write another Quartet, after which he adds:

überhaupt will ich mir auf diese Art den Weg zur großen Sinfonie bahnen. — Das Neueste in Wien ist, dß Beethoven ein Concert gibt, in welchem er seine neue Sinfonie, 3 Stücke aus der neuen Messe, u. eine neue Ouvertüre produciren läßt. — Wenn Gott will, so bin auch ich gesonnen, künftiges Jahr ein ähnliches Concert zu geben.

Translation:

anyhow I want to pave my way towards a grand Symphony in this way. — the latest here in Vienna is that Beethoven is setting up a concert in which he programs his new Symphony, three pieces from the new Mass and a new Overture. — God permitting, I have put my mind to giving a similar concert next year.

He ends the letter referring to his anticipated second visit to Zseliz:

... ich Anfangs May mit Esterhazy nach Ungarn gehe.

Translation:

... early May I go to Hungary with Esterhazy.

On 7 May Schubert attended the concert in which Beethoven presented his 9th Symphony. Feeling in better health, he was in Zseliz by the end of the month, again as music teacher of the Esterházy family for the summer season. Around this time his friend Moritz von Schwind wrote to Kupelwieser informing him that the composer had left for Hungary, planning to write a symphony. The Deutsch catalogue lists three compositions, all for piano four-hands, which Schubert composed during his first couple of months in Zseliz:

- Sonata in C major, D 812: autograph parts dated June 1824.
- Eight Variations on an original theme, D 813, composed between late May and the middle of July.
- Four Ländler, D 814, composed in July.

In the second half of July the composer wrote to his brother Ferdinand, starting with an analysis of the sorrow brought by his absence, followed by:

Damit Dich diese Zeilen nicht vielleicht verführen, zu glauben, ich sey nicht wohl, oder nicht heiteren Gemüthes, so beeile ich mich, Dich des Gegentheils zu versichern. Freylich ists nicht mehr jene glückliche Zeit, in der uns jeder Gegenstand mit einer jugendlichen Glorie umgeben scheint, sondern jenes fatale Erkennen einer miserablen Wirklichkeit, die ich mir durch meine Phantasie (Gott sey's gedankt) so viel als möglich zu verschönern suche. Man glaubt an dem Orte, wo man einst glücklicher war, hänge das Glück, indem es doch nur in uns selbst ist, und so erfuhr ich zwar eine unangenehme Täuschung ..., doch bin ich jetzt mehr im Stande, Glück und Ruhe in mir selbst zu finden, als damals. Als Beweis dessen werden Dir eine große Sonate und Variationen über ein selbst erfundenes Thema, beides zu 4 Hände, welche ich bereits componiert habe, dienen. Die Variationen erfreuen sich eines ganz besondern Beifalls.

Translation:

So that these lines wouldn't make you think I would be unwell or unhappy, I haste to assure you of the contrary. Surely, these are no longer the happy days, in which everything bathes in youthful glory, but the fatal recognition of a miserable reality, which, through my fantasy (thank God) I endeavour to embellish as much as possible. One would believe that happiness clings to places where one has known happier moments, while it resides only in ourselves, and so, when I encountered an unpleasant disappointment ..., I was nonetheless more able to find happiness and equanimity in myself than before. A grand Sonata [=D 812] and Variations on a theme of my own invention [=D 813], both for four hands, which I already composed, can serve to prove this. The Variations are a huge success.

This indicates that these pieces for piano four-hands were performed there and then, shortly after their completion by the composer, maybe even by the young countesses, his pupils. By around July 1824 symptoms of Schubert's venereal disease were as good as gone, which they would remain for the next two years. In August he writes to Schwind, again mentioning the Sonata D 812 and Variations D 813:

Ich bin noch immer Gottlob gesund u. würde mich hier recht wohl befinden, hätt' ich Dich, Schober u. Kupelwieser bey mir, so aber verspüre ich trotz des anziehenden bewußten Sternes manchmahl eine verfluchte Sehnsucht nach Wien. Mit Ende Septemb. hoffe ich Dich wieder zu sehn. Ich habe eine große Sonate u. Variationen zu 4 Hände componirt, welche letztere sich eines besondern Beyfalls hier erfreuen, da ich aber dem Geschmack der Ungarn nicht ganz traue, so überlasse ich's Dir u. den Wienern darüber zu entscheiden.

Translation:

I am, praise God, still in good health, and would consider myself well off here, if I'd have you, Schober and Kupelwieser by my side: thus, however, I sense, notwithstanding a certain attracting star, often a damned homesickness for Vienna. By the end of September I hope to see you again. I composed a grand Sonata and Variations for four hands, the second having become very popular here: while I don't completely trust the taste of the Hungarians, I leave it to you and the Viennese to be the judge on that.

The "attracting star" is interpreted as referring to Countess Karoline, who was going to turn 19 in September. Still in August, Schwind wrote to Schober:

Schubert hat geschrieben. Es geht ihm recht wohl und er ist fleißig. So viel ich weiß an einer Symphonie...

Translation:

Schubert has written. He goes very well and is industrious. As far as I know, on a Symphony...

A few weeks after Karoline's birthday, Schubert feels even more desolate than a month earlier when writing to Schwind – from the composer's letter of 21 September 1824 to Schober (who had left Vienna in 1823):

... Nun sitz ich allein hier im tiefen Ungarlande, in das ich mich leider zum 2^{ten} Male locken liess, ohne auch nur einen Menschen zu haben, mit dem ich ein gescheidtes Wort reden könnte. Ich habe seit der Zeit, dass du weg bist, beinahe keine Lieder componirt, aber mich in einigen Instrumental-Sachen versucht. Was mit meinen Opern geschehen wird, weiss der Himmel! Ungeachtet ich nun seit fünf Monaten gesund bin, so ist meine Heiterkeit doch oft getrübt durch Deine und Kuppels Abwesenheit, und verlebe manchmal sehr elende Tage; ...

Translation:

... Now I'm left alone here in rural Hungary, where I let myself be drawn for a second time, without having a soul with whom to engage in clever conversation. Since the time you left I hardly composed a song, trying some instrumental compositions instead. Heaven knows what will happen with my operas! Although I'm now healthy for five months, my joy is often dampened by your and Kupel[wieser]'s absence, and I often live miserable days; ...

Schubert returned to Vienna in October, in a carriage together with Baron Karl von Schönstein, a friend of Count Esterházy to whom Schubert had dedicated Die schöne Müllerin and who had participated, together with the composer and members of the Esterházy family, in music performances at Zseliz. Some three decades later, after becoming a champion of Schubert's music, Schönstein wrote:

Welch musikalisch-schöpferischer Reichtum in Schubert lag, erkannte man bald im Hause Esterházy; er wurde ein Liebling der Familie, blieb auch über Winter in Wien Musikmeister im Hause und begleitete die Familie auch spätere Sommer hindurch auf das genannte Landgut in Ungarn. Er war überhaupt bis zu seinem Tode viel im Hause des Grafen Esterházy.
Ein Liebesverhältnis mit einer Dienerin, welches Schubert in diesem Hause bald nach seinem Eintritt in dasselbe anknüpfte, wich in der Folge einer poetischeren Flamme, welche für die jüngere Tochter des Hauses, Komtesse Karoline, in seinem Inneren emporschlug. Dieselbe loderte fort bis an sein Ende.
Karoline schätzte ihn und sein Talent sehr hoch, erwiderte jedoch diese Liebe nicht, vielleicht ahnte sie dieselbe auch nicht einmal in dem Grade, als sie vorhanden war. Ich sage, denn er sie liebe, mußte ihr durch eine Äußerung Schuberts – die einzige Erklärung in Worten – klargeworden sein. Als sie nämlich einst Schubert im Scherz vorgeworfen, er habe ihr noch gar kein Musikstück dediziert, erwiderte jener: "Wozu denn, es ist Ihnen ja ohnehin alles gewidmet."

Translation:

The musical-creative richess laying in Schubert was swiftly recognised in the house of Count Esterházy: he became a favourite of the family, remaining music master in the house also throughout winter season in Vienna, and accompanied the family also during later summers to the aforementioned estate in Hungary. Anyhow, he was often in the house of Count Esterházy until his death.
A love affair with a servant, in which Schubert got himself involved shortly after entering the household, ceded, thereafter, for a more poetic flame which burst from his heart for the junger daughter of the house, Countess Karoline. This flame burned till the end of his life.
Karoline had a high esteem for him and his talent, however without reciprocating this love, maybe not even suspecting to which degree it was present. I say, that he loved her must have become clear to her by a few words by Schubert—his only declaration in words. When, in jest, she reproached him that he hadn't yet dedicated a composition to her, he replied to her: "To what end, it is all, without exception, dedicated to you."

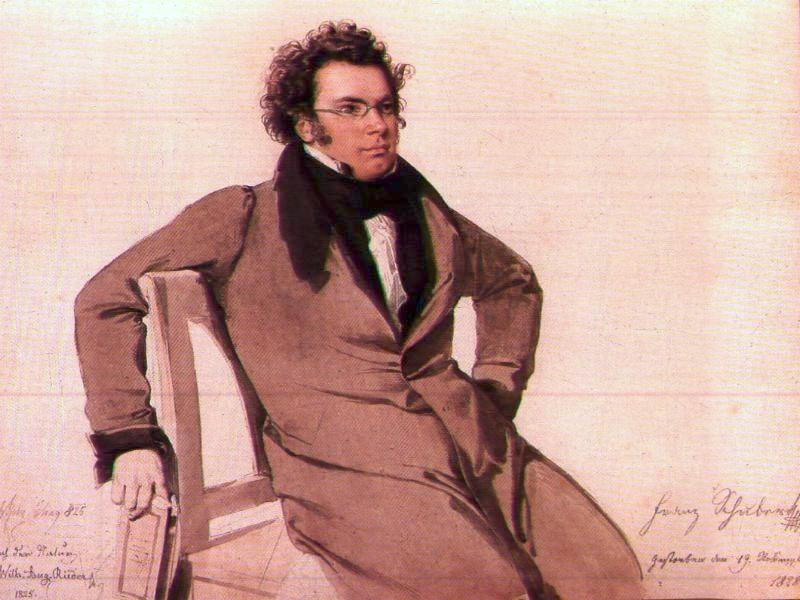
Schubert in 1825, watercolor by Wilhelm August Rieder.

In the summer of 1825, Schubert stayed in Gmunden from early June to the middle of July, and in Bad Gastein from the middle of August till early September. Contemporary correspondence of his friends makes clear he was working on a Symphony, later dubbed Gmunden-Gastein Symphony. In March 1828, on the anniversary of Beethoven's death, Schubert gave his only public concert: its scale was somewhat smaller than the ambition he voiced in his letter to Kupelwieser four years earlier (only chamber music was performed), but it was a considerable success. That same year he composed his last major work for piano four-hands, the Fantasia in F minor, D 940, which he dedicated to Karoline Esterházy. In 1829, the year after Schubert's death, it was published as his Op. 103. That year, some of the obituaries written by Schubert's friends mentioned a Symphony, composed in Bad Gastein in 1825, which was particularly liked by the composer.

== Movements ==
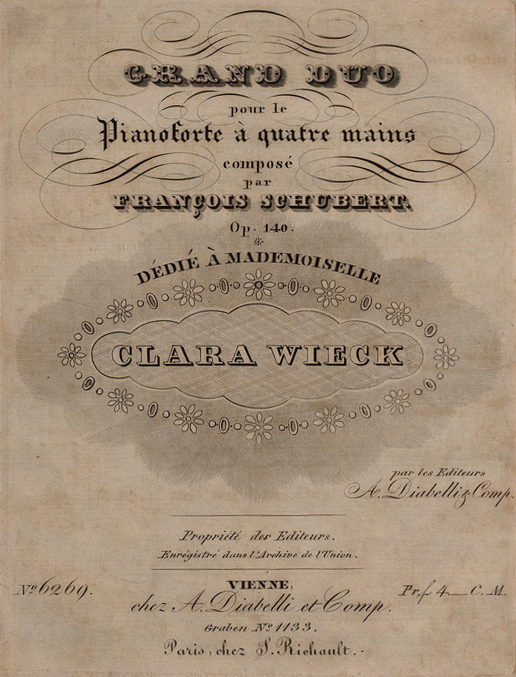
Title page of first edition

The Sonata in C major, D 812, in four movements, is the most elaborate of the four-hands piano pieces Schubert wrote during his summer in Zseliz in 1824. Performance time of the Sonata ranges from less than 37 minutes to over 47 minutes.

1. Allegro moderato
2. Andante
3. Scherzo and Trio
4. Allegro vivace

In the sonata's first movement, a sonata form in 2/2, the opening figure of the principal subject is shared by both pianists. This main theme consists of two phrases, each followed by a quiet cadence. The second subject, a melodious variant of the first, is presented in A♭ major in the secondo part, and is later shared by both pianists. The relatively short development section starts with a transposed version of the principal subject. In the concluding recapitulation, which has some striking modulations, the second theme is heard in a C minor tonality. The movement concludes with a broad coda.

The sonata's slow movement, in 3/8 time, is an andante in A♭ major. There is little complexity in the opening theme, but there is ingenuity in how both pianists imitate one another, with some daring harmonic clashes.

The scherzo movement is an allegro vivace with pianistic percussive dissonances. Its Trio is in F minor and has a straightforward rhythm contrasted with a melody with phrases of different lengths.

The first theme of the finale, in 2/4, has the rhythm of a Hungarian dance and balances between C major and A minor. The second theme has a Dvořákian look and feel. Passages where the themes are divided between the two pianists are demanding for the performers.

== Reception ==
The Sonata D 812 was published after Schubert's death, in 1837, when it was printed with the title Grand Duo. Schumann published his commentary, in which he described the work as a more feminine version of a Beethovenian symphony, in 1838. Joseph Joachim's symphonic arrangement of the Sonata was premiered a few years before the piano duet version had its first public performance in 1859. From the late 19th century to the second half of the 20th century it was thought possible that the Grand Duo was a piano version of the Gmunden-Gastein Symphony. Piano duos performing the Sonata include Sviatoslav Richter and Benjamin Britten, and Daniel Barenboim and Radu Lupu.

=== 19th century ===
When Anton Diabelli published the Grand Duo as Schubert's Op. 140 on 29 December 1837, he dedicated the edition to Clara Wieck, whom he also gave Schubert's autograph of the Sonata. A few months later, her future husband, Robert Schumann, wrote about the piece and its composer:

... scheint mir das Duo noch unter Beethoven'schem Einfluß entstanden, wie ich es denn auch für eine auf das Clavier übertragene Symphonie hielt, bis mich das Original-Manuscript in dem es von seiner eigenen Hand als "vierhändige Sonate" bezeichnet ist, eines Anderen überweisen wollte. "Wollte" sag' ich; denn noch immer kann ich nicht von meinem Gedanken. Wer so viel schreibt wie Schubert, macht mit Titeln am Ende nicht viel Federlesens, und so überschrieb er sein Werk in der Eile vielleicht Sonate, während es als Symphonie in seinem Kopfe fertig stand; des gemeineren Grundes noch zu erwähnen, daß sich zu einer Sonate doch immer eher Herausgeber fanden, als für eine Symphonie, in einer Zeit, wo sein Name erst bekannt zu werden anfing. Mit seinem Styl, der Art seiner Behandlung des Claviers vertraut, dieses Werk mit seinen andern Sonaten vergleichend, in denen sich der reinste Claviercharakter ausspricht, kann ich mir es nur als Orchesterstück auslegen. Man hört Saiten- und Blasinstrumente, Tutti's, einzelne Soli's, Paukenwirbel; die großbreite symphonische Form, selbst die Anklänge an Beethoven'sche Symphonieen, wie im zweiten Satz an das Andante der zweiten von Beethoven, im letzten an den letzten der A dur-Symphonie, wie einige blassere Stellen (...), die mir durch das Arrangement verloren zu haben scheinen, unterstützen meine Ansicht gleichfalls. Damit möchte ich das Duo aber gegen den Vorwurf schützen, daß es als Clavierstück nicht immer richtig gedacht sei, daß dem Instrument etwas zugemuthet wird, was es nicht leisten kann, während es als eine arrangirte Symphonie mit andern Augen zu betrachten wäre. Nehmen wir es so, und wir sind um eine Symphonie reicher. Die Anklänge an Beethoven erwähnten wir schon; zehren wir doch alle von seinen Schätzen. Aber auch ohne diesen erhabenen Vorgänger wäre Schubert kein Anderer worden; seine Eigenthümlichkeit würde vielleicht nur später durchgebrochen sein. So wird, der einigermaßen Gefühl und Bildung hat, Beethoven und Schubert auf den ersten Seiten erkennen und unterscheiden. Schubert ist ein Mädchencharakter an Jenen gehalten, bei weitem geschwätziger, weicher und breiter; gegen Jenen ein Kind, das sorglos unter den Riesen spielt. So verhalten sich diese Symphonieensätze zu denen Beethoven's und können in ihrer Innigkeit gar nicht anders, als von Schubert gedacht werden. Zwar bringt auch er seine Krafstellen, bietet auch er Massen auf; doch verhält es sich immer wie Weib zum Mann, der befiehlt, wo jenes bittet und überredet. Dies alles aber nur im Vergleich zu Beethoven; gegen Andere ist er noch Mann genug, ja der kühnste und freigeistigste der neueren Musiker. In diesem Sinne möge man das Duo zur Hand nehmen. Nach den Schönheiten braucht man nicht zu suchen; sie kommen uns entgegen und gewinnen, je öfter man sie betrachtet; man muß es durchaus lieb gewinnen dieses leise liebende Dichtergemüth. So sehr gerade das Adagio an Beethoven erinnert, so wüßte ich auch kaum etwas, wo Schubert sich mehr gezeigt als Er; so leibhaftig, daß einem wohl bei einzelnen Tacten sein Name über die Lippen schlüpft, und dann hat's getroffen. Auch darin werden wird übereinstimmen, daß sich das Werk vom Anfang bis zum Schluß auf gleicher Höhe hält; ...

— Neue Zeitschrift für Musik
Translation:

... it seems to me that the Duo still originated under Beethoven's influence, so that I considered it a Symphony transcribed for piano, until the original manuscript, in which [Schubert] designated it as "Sonata for four hands", would instruct me otherwise. I say "would"; while I still hold on to my thought. Anyone writing as much as Schubert does ultimately not waste much time on titles, and thus he possibly hastily titled his work Sonata, while he had it ready in his head as symphony; a more mundane reason may have been that it would have been easier to find a publisher for a Sonata than for a Symphony, at a time when his name only began to be known. Being acquainted with his style, his way of treating the piano, and comparing this work with his other Sonatas, from which the clearest pianistic character speaks, I can only see it as an orchestral piece. One hears strings and winds, tuttis, some solos, drum rolls; the broad symphonic form, even the reminiscences of Beethoven's symphonies, like in the second movement of the "Andante" of Beethoven's second, in the last movement of the Symphony in A major's last movement, and a few weaker passages (...), which seem to have lost by the arrangement, also confirm my view. Nonetheless I'd defend the Duo against the reproach that it wouldn't have been conceived throughout as a piano piece, that it would challenge the instrument above its possibilities, while it can be seen in a different light as an arranged symphony. Approached thus, we have gained a Symphony. The reminiscences of Beethoven were already mentioned; let us all exploit his treasures. But even without this eminent predecessor Schubert wouldn't have become someone else; it may just have taken longer for his specificity to break through. Thus anyone with any feeling and culture would recognise and distinguish Beethoven and Schubert from the first pages. Schubert, a girlish character dependent of the other, is far more garrulous, soft and broad; compared to [Beethoven] he is a child playing carefree among giants. This is how these symphony movements, which in their intimacy could only have been conceived by Schubert, relate to those of Beethoven. True, also [Schubert] has his forceful moments, he also can conjure up massive [sounds]; nonetheless, it always relates as woman to man, the latter commands where the former pleads and persuades. All of this only in comparison to Beethoven; compared to others he is enough of a man, truly the most audacious and liberated of the more recent musicians. In this spirit one can take up the Duo. Beauty is apparent without looking for it: it approaches us and conquers, more so every time one looks at it; inevitably always growing more fond of this quietly loving poetic mind. As much as the "Adagio" immediately reminds us of Beethoven, it is hard to think of anything wherein Schubert has shown himself more clearly than [Beethoven]; so much in the flesh that it takes but a few bars before [Schubert]'s name slips over your lips, and then it hits. Also about this we will agree: this composition keeps to the same [high] level from start to end; ...

— Translation

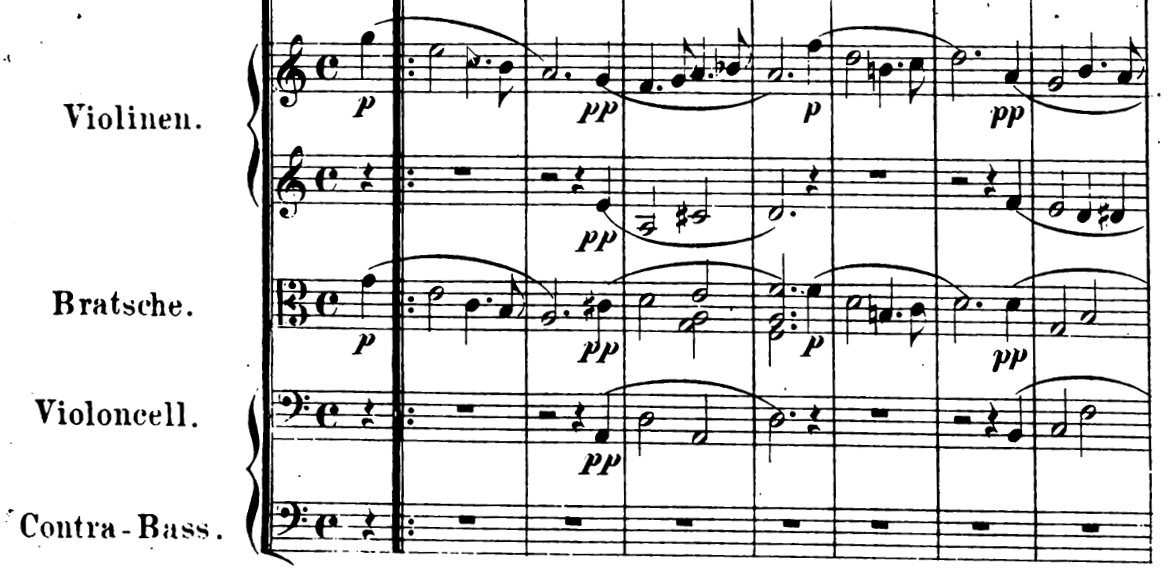
Joachim's orchestration: start of first movement

In 1855 Joseph Joachim orchestrated the Grand Duo on Johannes Brahms's instigation. The arrangement was first performed in February 1856 in Hannover. In Leipzig, Joachim's Symphony after the Piano Duo in C major was performed in 1859 and 1864. Brahms conducted Joachim's version several times in the 1870s. It was published as Sinfonie von Franz Schubert: Nach Op.140 Instrumentirt von Joseph Joachim ("Symphony by Franz Schubert: Orchestrated after Op. 140 by Joseph Joachim") in 1873. Following in Diabelli's footsteps, Joachim dedicated his arrangement to Clara Schumann. Joachim omitted the tempo indication for the 3rd movement, and replaced the Allegro vivace of the "Finale" movement by Allegro moderato. In London, the Symphony after Schubert's Grand Duo was first performed in 1876, under Joachim's direction.

Schubert's original piano duet version was premiered in December 1859. The 19th-century collected edition of Schubert's works adopted the Sonata in the second volume of its 9th series in 1888, edited by Anton Door. In the last decades of the 19th century there was a renewed attention for the Gmunden-Gastein Symphony: according to authors such as George Grove it was lost without a trace. Others entertained the idea that the Grand Duo might be a piano version of that Symphony.

=== 20th century ===
Donald Tovey wrote about the Grand Duo in 1935, mostly reiterating Schumann's views, and further contributing to the conflation of the Gmunden-Gastein Symphony with the piano four-hands Sonata. According to Tovey, Schubert's Sonata was void of pianistic characteristics. Like Tovey, Bernard Shore found the work effective when orchestrated. New orchestrations of the Sonata were provided by Felix Weingartner (c. 1934), Anthony Collins (1939), Marius Flothuis (1940–42), Karl Salomon (1946) and Fritz Oeser (1948). Karl Ulrich Schnabel's arrangement of the Sonata for one pianist was published in 1949. Arturo Toscanini recorded Joachim's orchestral version of Schubert's Op. 140 with the NBC Symphony Orchestra in 1941. Another recording of Joachim's arrangement, by Felix Prohaska conducting the Vienna State Opera Orchestra, was released in January 1951. Clemens Krauss conducted the Bavarian Radio Symphony Orchestra in a 1954 recording of Karl Frotzler's orchestration of the Grand Duo.

In his 1958 biography of the composer, Maurice J. E. Brown writes that "the proportions of the [Grand Duo] suggest a symphony rather than a sonata," but he rejects the idea promoted by Schumann and Tovey that it would be a symphony in disguise. Among other incompatibilities, the dates (i.e. 1824 for the Sonata and 1825 for the Symphony) don't add up for an identification of Schubert's Op. 140 with the Gmunden-Gasteiner. When Schubert wrote a draft of a symphony down as a piano score he would title it Symphony: not so with the Sonata in C major, the autograph of which is not a draft but a fair copy, thus, according to Brown, representing the composer's final word on the matter. Symphonic effects are legion in all of Schubert's piano compositions, the 1824 Sonata for piano four-hands being no exception in that regard. Brown is unconvinced by the orchestral versions, which he sees as betraying the pianistic origins of the piece. According to Brown, there is a difference in how Schubert organises a symphony and how he organises a sonata, the Grand Duo following the principles of the latter composition type: Brown illustrates that with a few comparisons between the four-hand piano composition and solo piano sonatas which Schubert wrote around the same time. The arguments against the "symphony in disguise" proposition are summarized thus in the 1978 edition of the Deutsch catalogue:

Schuberts Überschift "Sonate", außerdem seine Berichte von der Komposition einer "großen Sonate ... zu 4 Hände" in Briefen aus Zseliz (...) sprechen indessen ebenso gegen ein zugrundeliegendes Orchesterwerk, wie stilistisch die zahlreichen klavieristischen Spielfiguren.

Translation:

Schubert's title "Sonata", on top of his messages about the composition of a "grand Sonata ... for four hands" in letters from Zseliz (...) speak on this matter as much against an underlying orchestral composition, as, from a stylistic perspective, the multiple pianistic figurations.

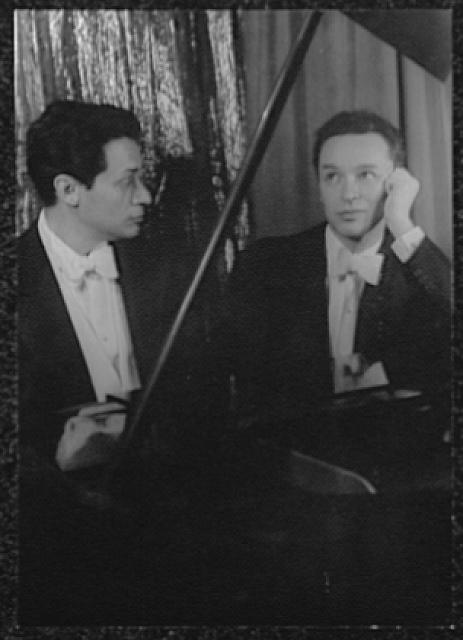
Arthur Gold and Robert Fizdale recorded the Grand Duo in 1955

The piano duet version of D 812 was recorded by:

- Paul Badura-Skoda and Jörg Demus (1951)
- Gold and Fizdale (1955)
- Alfred Brendel and Évelyne Crochet (1962)
- Jörg Demus and Paul Badura-Skoda (1963; live; recording time: 36:26)
- Sviatoslav Richter and Benjamin Britten (1965; mono; live; recording time: 39:12)
- Christian Ivaldi and Noël Lee (1977; recording time: 36:53)
- Anne Queffélec and Imogen Cooper (1978; recording time: 41:05)
- Alfons and Aloys Kontarsky (1979)
- Christoph Eschenbach and Justus Frantz (1979; recording time: 47:21)
- Karl Ulrich Schnabel and Joan Rowland (1983)
- Minkofski-Garrigues Kilian Duo (1985)
- Peter Noke and Helen Krizos (April 1986; recording time: 42:46)
- Duo Crommelynck (1987)
- Nadine Palmier and Joël Rigal (October 1990; recording time: 40:21)
- Isabel Beyer and Harvey Dagul (1993; recording time: 45:42)
- Klavierduo Stenzl (1993)
- Duo Tal & Groethuysen (1995)
- Daniel Barenboim and Radu Lupu (1996; recording time: 43:13)
- Robert Levin and Malcolm Bilson (1996; recording time: 46:32)
- Begoña Uriarte and Karl-Hermann Mrongovius (1997; recording time: 44:20)
- Camelia Sima and David Montgomery (1997)
- Anthony Goldstone and Caroline Clemmow (1998; recording time: 36:18)
- Duo Alkan (2000)

René Leibowitz orchestrated the Grand Duo around 1965. In 1986 Max Harrison returned to the issue of whether the Sonata D 812 is rather pianistic or rather orchestral: he saw many passages, such as transitions realised with a filigree typical for Schubert's piano style, that proved too difficult to orchestrate convincingly, and only a few, such as pedal notes, which are helped by an orchestral realisation – but then, Schubert was far from the only composer using such long notes in compositions written for pianofortes that couldn't sustain a sound for very long. In 1991, Raymond Leppard recorded his own orchestration of D 812. Joachim's arrangement of the Grand Duo was, in the last decades of the 20th century, recorded by:

- Claudio Abbado conducting the Chamber Orchestra of Europe (1987)
- Michael Halász conducting the Failoni Orchestra (1994)
- Leon Botstein conducting the American Symphony Orchestra (1994)
- Christoph Eschenbach with the Houston Symphony (1996)

Schubert's autograph of the Sonata ended up in the Bodleian Library, as part of the Margaret Deneke Mendelssohn collection. The New Schubert Edition published the Sonata in 1978, edited by Christa Landon. Scholarship of the 1970s and the 1980s identified the Gmunden-Gastein Symphony with Schubert's last symphony, the "Great" C major Symphony, D 944. In the late 1980s Schumann's contentions about Schubert's feminity started to attract attention from a different perspective: articles published in 19th-Century Music described Schubert as homosexual, to which the 1838 comments about the Grand Duo, published in the Neue Zeitschrift für Musik, were seen as corroborating evidence. Joseph Horowitz published articles about the Grand Duo in the New York Times: in 1992 commenting on Leppard's recording of his orchestrated version, and in 2000 when Barenboim and Lupu had programmed the piano version of the Sonata for a Carnegie Hall concert. According to Horowitz, the imitation of orchestral sounds is idiosyncratic of Schubert's piano style, and, in short, the four-hands piano work is, notwithstanding many symphonic characteristics and the difficulty to make it sound well on piano, no symphony.

=== 21st century ===
External videos
- Schubert: Grand Duo – Jonathan Plowright and Aaron Shorr

Pianists recording the Grand Duo in the 21st century:

- Claire Aebersold and Ralph Neiweem (2004)
- Duo Koroliov (2004)
- Evgeny Kissin and James Levine (2005; live; recording time: 40:49)
- GrauSchumacher Piano Duo (2005; recording time: 37:15)
- Allan Schiller and John Humphreys (2007; recording time: 43:35)
- Duo d'Accord (Lucia Huang & Sebastian Euler; 2009; recording time: 38:42)
- Jonathan Plowright and Aaron Shorr (2012; live; video recording)
- Ismaël Margain and Guillaume Bellom (2012)
- Jan Vermeulen and Veerle Peeters (2016)
- Adrienne Soós and Ivo Haag (2018; recording time: 42:42)

In his book on Schubert's Winterreise, Ian Bostridge writes that the scholarly discussions about whether the composer was homosexual died out some two decades after they began. Giving an overview of these discussions, Bostridge describes it as anachronistic to paste late 20th-century concepts about gayness to Schubert's early 19th-century world: androgyny, the femininity alluded to by Schumann, even homo-eroticism as in some of Goethe's writings (e.g. the "Ganymed" poem which was set by Schubert, D 544), belonged to that early Romantic world, without it being possible to conclude anything sexual (as in homosexual) with regard to the composer from that cultural environment. Schubert fell in love with Karoline Esterházy, like he had fallen in love with other women before, as testified in contemporary documents, some of which were additionally uncovered during the late 20th- to early 21st-century discussions about the topic, for instance by Rita Steblin. Another overview of the same topic, like Bostridge's from the middle of the second decade of the 21st century, is given in Julian Horton's Schubert: also this author sees overinterpretation in some of the 1990s analyses concluding on Schubert's sexuality.

Of all the orchestral arrangements of D 812, only Joachim's remained as repertoire piece. The Berliner Philharmoniker, conducted by Murray Perahia, performed it in a January 2013 concert. Michael Stegemann, who wrote the programme notes for that concert, distances himself from the idea that Schubert would have unconsciously written for orchestra while composing the Sonata. In a contribution published in 2016, Hans-Joachim Hinrichsen analyses the part of Schubert's March 1824 letter to Kupelwieser about paving his way to the grand symphony via chamber music compositions. Hinrichsen writes about a caesura in Schubert's output, following that letter, in which the composer re-orientates from primarily vocal music (such as operas that had been rejected shortly before), to instrumental music, in preparation of reaching a wider audience via a symphonic concert. The Sonata in C major for piano four-hands was the first major work after that caesura: according to Hinrichsen, Schubert's ambition was however not to learn how to write for orchestra (which he already knew how to do) via these chamber music compositions, but rather, how to write for a wider audience than his circle of friends (who would like whatever he composed). Hence Schubert's yearning, by the end of the summer, to let the Viennese public judge the first results of this new approach, instead of the easy success in rural Hungary.

== See also ==
- Grand Duo (disambiguation), for other compositions (nick)named Grand Duo

== Sources ==
- Anderson, Keith (1994). Schubert Symphonies: Symphony No. 4, "Tragic", D. 417 – Symphony in C (Grand Duo, D. 812, orch. Joachim) (PDF) (liner notes). Failoni Orchestra, Michael Halász. Naxos. 8.553095.
- Anderson, Keith (2008). Grand Duo in C major • Four Ländler • Variations on an Original Theme (PDF) (liner notes). Schubert: Piano Works for Four Hands, Vol. 5. Allan Schiller and John Humphreys (piano). Naxos. 8.570354.
- Bodley, Lorraine Byrne (2016). "Introduction: Schuberts late style and current musical scholarship". In Bodley, Lorraine Byrne; Horton, Julian (eds.). Schubert's Late Music: History, Theory, Style. Cambridge University Press. ISBN 9781107111295.
- Bostridge, Ian (2015). Schubert's Winter Journey: Anatomy of an Obsession. Knopf Doubleday. ISBN 9780307961648.
- Brett, Philip (1997). "Piano Four-Hands: Schubert and the Performance of Gay Male Desire". 19th-Century Music. 21 (2). University of California Press: 149–176. doi:10.2307/746896. JSTOR 746896.
- Brown, Maurice J. E. [in German] (1958). Schubert: A Critical Biography. MacMillan & Co.
- Brown, Clive (1988). Schubert: Symphonie No. 8 "Unvollendete" – Grand Duo (liner notes). Chamber Orchestra of Europe, Claudio Abbado. Deutsche Grammophon. DG 423 655-2.
- Clive, Peter (1997). Schubert and His World: A Biographical Dictionary. Clarendon Press. ISBN 019816582X.
- Cone, Edward T. (1982). The Composer's Voice. University of California Press. ISBN 0520046471.
- Deutsch, Otto Erich, ed. (1914). Franz Schubert: Die Dokumente seines Lebens und Schaffens [Franz Schubert: The documents of his life and work] (in German). Vol. II/1. Munich and Leipzig: Georg Müller.
- Deutsch, Otto Erich (1978). Franz Schubert: Thematisches Verzeichnis seiner Werke in chronologischer Folge. VIII (Supplement) (in German). Vol. 4. Kassel: Bärenreiter. ISBN 9783761805718. ISMN 9790006305148.
- Diggory, Terence (2009). Encyclopedia of the New York School Poets. Infobase. ISBN 9781438119052.
- Door, Anton, ed. (1888). "Sonate: für das Pianoforte zu vier Händen componirt" [Sonata: composed for piano four-hands]. Pianoforte zu vier Händen: Ouvertüren, Sonaten, Rondos, Variationen [Piano four hands: Overtures, Sonatas, Rondos and Variations]. Franz Schubert's Werke: Kritisch durchgesehene Gesammtausgabe (in German). Vol. IX/2. Leipzig: Breitkopf & Härtel. pp. 66–117.
- Dörffel, Alfred (1884). "Statistik der Concerte im Saale des Gewandhauses zu Leipzig" [Statistic of the concerts in the Gewandhaus hall in Leipzig]. Geschichte der Gewandhausconcerte zu Leipzig vom 25. November 1781 bis 25. November 1881: Im Auftrage der Concert-Direction verfasst [History of the Gewandhaus concerts in Leipzig from 25 November 1781 to 25 November 1881: As commissioned by the concert direction] (in German). Leipzig.
- Feil, Arnold [in German] (2016). Metzler Musik Chronik: Vom frühen Mittelalter bis zur Gegenwart (in German) (2nd ed.). Springer. ISBN 9783476001450.
- Gibbs, Christopher H. (1994). "About Schubert's Arrangers: Mottl, Liszt, Brahms, Joachim". American Symphony Orchestra.
- Grove, George; Hadow, William Henry (1908). "SCHUBERT, Franz Peter". In Fuller Maitland, John Alexander (ed.). Grove's Dictionary of Music and Musicians. Vol. IV. London: Macmillan. pp. 280–335. OCLC 407077.
- Hall, Michael (2017). "Opus 8". Schubert's Song Sets. Routledge. pp. 85ff. ISBN 9781351755337.
- Harrison, Max (1986). Grand Duo & Sonata in B flat major (liner notes). Hyperion. pp. 2–4. CDA66217.
- Hayden, Deborah (2008). Pox: Genius, Madness, And The Mysteries Of Syphilis. Hachette UK. ISBN 9780786724130.
- Hinrichsen, Hans-Joachim (2016). "Is There a Late Style in Schubert's Oeuvre?". In Bodley, Lorraine Byrne; Horton, Julian (eds.). Rethinking Schubert. Oxford University Press. pp. 17–28. doi:10.1093/acprof:oso/9780190200107.003.0002. ISBN 9780190606831.
- Horowitz, Joseph (May 24, 1992). "A Symphony Is Where You Find It". New York Times. ISSN 0362-4331.
- Horowitz, Joseph (November 26, 2000). "A Schubert Masterpiece in a Rare Package". New York Times. ISSN 0362-4331.
- Horton, Julian (2017). Schubert. Routledge. ISBN 9781351549974.
- Joachim, Joseph (1873). Sinfonie von Franz Schubert: Nach Op.140 Instrumentirt [Symphony by Franz Schubert: Orchestrated after Op. 140] (in German). Vienna: C.A. Spina's Nachfolger (Friedrich Schreiber).
- Landon, Christa [in German], ed. (1978). "Sonate in C, D 812 op.post.140". Werke für Klavier zu vier Händen. Series VII: Piano Music (in German). Vol. 2. Bärenreiter. ISMN 9790006472093. BA 5514.
- Leppard, Raymond (1993). "7. An Orchestration of Schubert's Grand Duo, D. 812". In Lewis, Thomas P. (ed.). Raymond Leppard on Music: An Anthology of Critical and Personal Writings. Pro/Am Music Resources. pp. 285–289. ISBN 0912483962.
- Montgomery, David [at Wikidata] (2003). Franz Schubert's Music in Performance: Compositional Ideals, Notational Intent, Historical Realities, Pedagogical Foundations. Monographs in musicology. Vol. 11. Pendragon Press. ISBN 9781576470251.
- Newbould, Brian (1999). Schubert: The Music and the Man. University of California Press. ISBN 9780520219571.
- Schlüren, Christoph (October 2017). "Preface". Schubert, Franz / arr. Joachim, Joseph: Symphony in C after the Grand Duo D 812. Mainz: Schott.
- Schumann, Robert (5 June 1838). "Aus Franz Schubert's Nachlaß" [From Franz Schubert's legacy]. Neue Zeitschrift für Musik (in German). 8 (45). Leipzig: 177–179.
- Schumann, Robert (2018) [1854, 1888–89, 1891, 1914]. "Franz Schubert's letzte Compositionen" [Franz Schubert's last compositions]. In Simon, Heinrich [in German]; Jansen, Gustav [in German]; Kreisig, Martin [in German]; et al. (eds.). Gesammelte Schriften über Musik und Musiker [Collected writings about music and musicians] (in German). Vol. II. Wikisource. pp. 234–240 (1854), 108–112 (1891).
- Shore, Bernard (1950). Sixteen Symphonies. Readers Union.
- Steblin, Rita (2008). "Schubert's Pepi: His Love Affair with the Chambermaid Josepha Pöcklhofer and Her Surprising Fate". The Musical Times. 149 (1903). Musical Times Publications: 47–69. doi:10.2307/25434538. JSTOR 25434538.
- Stegemann, Michael [in German] (2013). "Murray Perahia with works by Mozart and Schubert: Programme Guide". www.digitalconcerthall.com. Translated by Anderson, Phyllis. Berliner Philharmoniker.
- Tovey, Donald (1935). Symphonies. Essays in Musical Analysis. Vol. I. Oxford University Press. OCLC 632992311.
