= Sidney Newman =

English musician and scholar

Sidney Thomas Mayow Newman CBE MA, (Oxon) Hon. DMus, (Dunelm) Hon. RAM FRCO FCTL FRSE (4 March 1906 – 22 September 1971) was a music scholar, academic, pianist and conductor. He was Reid Professor of Music and Dean of the Faculty of Music at Edinburgh University from 1941 to 1970. Born in London, though with roots in Nailsworth Gloucestershire, he was educated first at Clifton College, Bristol, where in his teens he was awarded a fellowship of the Royal College of Organists, then at Christ Church, Oxford, where he was organ scholar from 1924 to 1928, took a first-class Bachelor of Arts degree in classics and then read for the Bachelor of Music degree; he then studied the violin, piano, conducting and composition at the Royal College of Music between 1929 and 1930. In 1930, he was appointed lecturer at Armstrong College, Durham, and as conductor of Newcastle upon Tyne's Bach choir. In 1941, he was appointed to the Reid Professorship of Music at the University of Edinburgh, and remained in the chair until 1970. In 1947 he was one of the founders of the Edinburgh International Festival. He was elected to the Royal Society of Edinburgh in 1941, and was awarded an honorary Doctor of Music degree from Durham University in 1946. He was the Cramb Lecturer at the University of Glasgow in 1956 and was appointed a Commander of the Order of the British Empire in 1962.

In the late 1960s he was the guiding light in procuring the Raymond Russell collection of early keyboard instruments and finding a home for them in the University of Edinburgh's St Cecilia's Hall, where once again he played a major part in the original refurbishment of this historic concert hall which now houses the University of Edinburgh's internationally important collection of musical instruments.

According to The Times, "though a skilled contrapuntist and scholar, notably of Bach, he published little ... but [at the Reid School] was able to sustain the high standards of musicianship, scholarship and performance established during Tovey's reign—indeed he was a less erratic conductor". He died, aged 65, only a year after retiring from the Reid chair.
