= Reid Concert Hall =

Concert hall in City of Edinburgh, Scotland

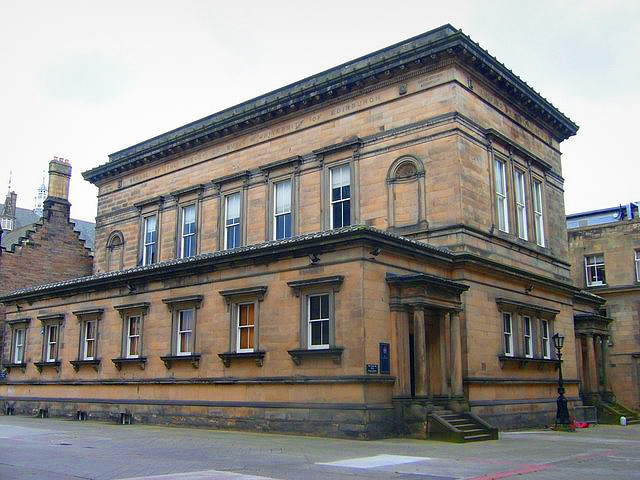
- Reid Concert Hall

- Location within Edinburgh city centre Location within Scotland
- Former names: Reid School of Music

General information
- Type: Concert hall
- Architectural style: Italianate
- Location: Edinburgh, Scotland, UK, 74 Lauriston Place
- Coordinates: 55.9448062°N 3.1896425°W
- Construction started: 13 February 1858
- Opened: 14 February 1859
- Owner: University of Edinburgh

Design and construction
- Architect: David Cousin
- Designations: Category A listed building

Other information
- Seating capacity: 218

Website
- www.eca.ed.ac.uk/facility/reid-concert-hall

The Reid Concert Hall is a small music venue in the city of Edinburgh, Scotland. It is located in the south-western corner of Bristo Square about 0.53 kilometres (0.33 mi) south of the Royal Mile, and is part of the University of Edinburgh. Originally opened in 1859 as the Reid School of Music by the university's professor of music, John Donaldson (1789-1865), it was designed by the Scottish Architect David Cousin and is a Category A listed building. The hall is named after General John Reid, an army officer and musician who founded the Chair of Music (Reid Professor of Music) at the university. The Reid Concerts take place every 13 February.

== Performances ==
The Reid Hall hosts a number of classical chamber music concerts throughout the year, mostly performed by students and academics. The Reid Concerts are performed every year under the organisation of the Reid Professor. They are held on 13 February in remembrance of General John Reid and in line with the terms of his bequest that established the professorship.

In its history a number of works by Kenneth Leighton were premiered at the Reid Hall. After the composer's death, the hall hosted a memorial concert performed by Wakefield Cathedral Choir.

During the Edinburgh Festival Fringe, the Reid Hall is used as a performance venue called "The Cowbarn" by Underbelly.

== Architecture ==
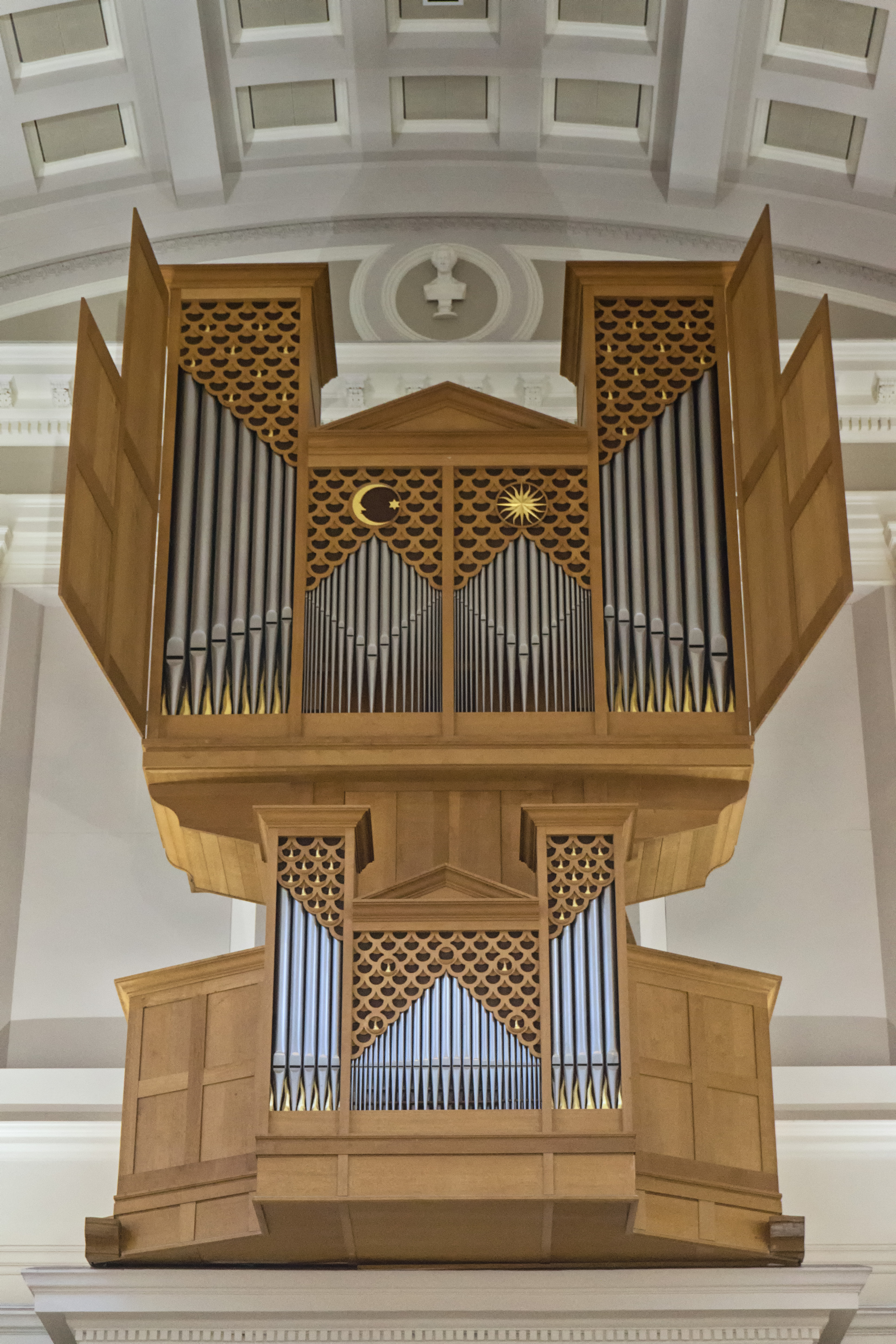
The 1978 Ahrend organ inside the concert hall

The Reid School of Music is a tall, rectangular sandstone ashlar building, designed by David Cousin in an Italianate Neoclassical style. The exterior large sash windows are flanked by decorative shell-headed niches. The roof is surrounded with an ornate, dentilled cornice and heavy, bracketed eaves, below which is an inscription carved into the frieze, " Endowed by General Reid — School of the theory of music — University of Edinburgh". Steps lead up to the entrances, which are flanked by pairs of classical columns and topped with porticos.

The interior consists mostly of a spacious concert hall, which is noted for its highly decorated neoclassical coffered tunnel vaulted ceiling. Against the east wall of the concert hall is a reproduction classical organ, which was built by Jürgen Ahrend in 1978. The wooden casing was designed by James Haig Marshall of Ian G Lindsay and Partners. The concert hall was designed to offer "dry" acoustics with low reverberation. By contrast, the neighbouring McEwan Hall opened in 1897 is a grand, colossal space with high reverberation.

== Music museum ==
When the Reid Hall was built, Professor John Donaldson also added a museum gallery to display his private collection of old and unusual musical instruments, which was considered to be the oldest purpose-built musical museum in Europe. The North Room housed the John Donaldson Collection of Musical Instruments, which, along with the Russell Collection, formed part of the Musical Instruments collection of the University of Edinburgh. In May 2017, during a £6.5m restoration and renovation of St Cecilia's Hall, the instruments were relocated from the Reid Hall to the existing museum collection at St Cecilia's Hall, resulting in a unified, permanent collection of over 5,000 objects.

== See also ==
- List of music museums
- St Cecilia's Hall
