= Sophie Weisse =

- Born: 1852; Edinburgh, Scotland
- Died: 1945 (aged 92–93); Guildford, England
- Occupation: Teacher
- Known for: Founded the school Northlands, and oversaw Donald Tovey's early education

Sophie Weisse (1852–1945) was a Scottish music teacher and founder of Northlands, an all-girls school in Surrey, England. She was the teacher and life-long friend of the music scholar and composer Donald Tovey.

== Biography ==
Weisse was born in Edinburgh in 1852 to immigrant parents. Her father, Traugott Heinrich Weisse, was a refugee of the German Revolution of 1848. Although blind, he worked as a German language teacher and wrote a book on German grammar, which ran into multiple editions. His wife, Sophie Marquidorff, was a Lithuanian pianist who performed regularly in chamber-music concerts in Edinburgh. Weisse had a younger brother, Heinrich, born in 1855. Like their father, Heinrich also worked as a teacher. In adulthood he used the name Henry Whitehouse. A sister Mary was born a year after Henry, and then a brother Victor was born in 1860. The family home was a cultural centre for Edinburgh people with interests in literature and philosophy.

Little is known of Weisse's early life and education.

Weisse had a large network of friends and associates. She knew Robert Louis Stevenson as a child through school and her father's role as his German tutor. Weisse claimed it was her father's influence that encouraged Stevenson to take up writing. Both Weisse and her brother Henry were long-time friends of Hungarian violinist Joseph Joachim. She spent time with Leopold von Ranke in the final weeks of his life, and published an account of their time, Leopold von Ranke, reminiscences of Berlin 1884-1886.

Weisse never married and had no children of her own. For a few years following Tovey's divorce from his first wife, she and her former student, Clara Wallace, had joint guardianship of his young son, John Wellcome.

Weisse died in January 1945 at Guildford, Surrey.

== Teaching career ==
On the suggestion of friends, Weisse went to Eton in early 1880 with the intention of settling and establishing a school for the children of the college masters. She purchased Bendemere House in Englefield Green and turned it into an all-girls school called Northlands in 1892. Weisse ran the school for twenty-five years. It was a school of general education, but music and art were given a prominent place in the curriculum. Elizabeth Ponsonby numbered among the pupils. Drawing upon her network of associates, Weisse had many musical celebrities visit the school, including Joseph Joachim, Maud MacCarthy, flautist Louis Fleury and cellist Pablo Casals. In her role as a teacher, Weisse encountered the young Donald Tovey, who would go on to become a renowned pianist, music scholar and composer.

== Relationship with Donald Tovey ==
Upon identifying Tovey's talent for music at the age of four, Weisse took it upon herself to manage his education. She oversaw all aspects of his education until he attended Balliol College, Oxford. Despite not being a pianist herself, Weisse had studied Ludwig Deppe's piano method and used this as the basis to teach Tovey the piano. When Tovey was an adolescent, she arranged for him to study counterpoint with Walter Parratt and James Higgs, and composition with Hubert Parry.

Tovey featured as the pianist in the Northland's concerts, providing a platform for his launch as a concert pianist.

Weisse also supported Tovey's career by financing the publication of his Piano concerto in 1903, of which she was the dedicatee. She subsequently provided the funds for the publication of more of his work between 1906 and 1913.

Weisse and Tovey maintained a relationship throughout their lives, although it was strained at times. Weisse disapproved of choices Tovey made in his personal life and expressed frustration with a stall in his career between 1902 and 1914. When the Reid Chair of Music at the University of Edinburgh became available to Tovey, Weisse was dismissive, believing that the role was beneath him, stating that the students are ‘the worst set of amateurs’ and expressed her disappointment that he had passed up the opportunity of a summer of concerts in mainland Europe. However, upon Tovey's acceptance of the role of Reid Professor of Music at the University, Weisse followed Tovey to Edinburgh.

Whilst Tovey held of the post of Reid Professor, he bestowed on Weisse an honorary degree of Doctor of Music in 1936, in recognition of her services to music.

== Philanthropy ==
Weisse was a benefactor of the University of Edinburgh, with which she had an association through her relationship with Tovey.

In memory of Tovey, upon his death in 1941, she gifted the property at 18 Buccleuch Place to the University. The property was named 'The Tovey Memorial Rooms', with the intention that it be used for student study. She also gifted Philip de Laszlo portraits of Tovey and herself, and £750 for the foundation of the Tovey Memorial Prize for annual award to the undergraduate in the Faculty of Music who shows the greatest promise in composition or in instrumental performance.

Her collection of around 600 books and scores relating to Beethoven was purchased by the University in 1948.

Much of her correspondence, both professional and personal, is held in the University Archives. It includes correspondence between Weisse and Tovey, Louis Fleury, Hubert Parry, Joseph and Ellen Joachim, and J.A. Fuller-Maitland.
