= Grand Duo =

Grand Duo may refer to

- Violin Sonata in A major, D 574 (Schubert)
- Sonata in C major for piano four-hands, D 812 (Schubert)
- Grand Duo concertant (Chopin and Franchomme), cello and piano
- Gran Duo Concertante, two double basses and orchestra by Bottesini
- Grand Duo Concertant (Weber), clarinet and piano
