= Frederick Niecks =

German musical scholar and author

Frederick Niecks (3 February 1845 – 24 June 1924) was a German musical scholar and author who resided in Scotland for most of his life. He is best remembered for his biographies of Frédéric Chopin and Robert Schumann.

== Biography ==
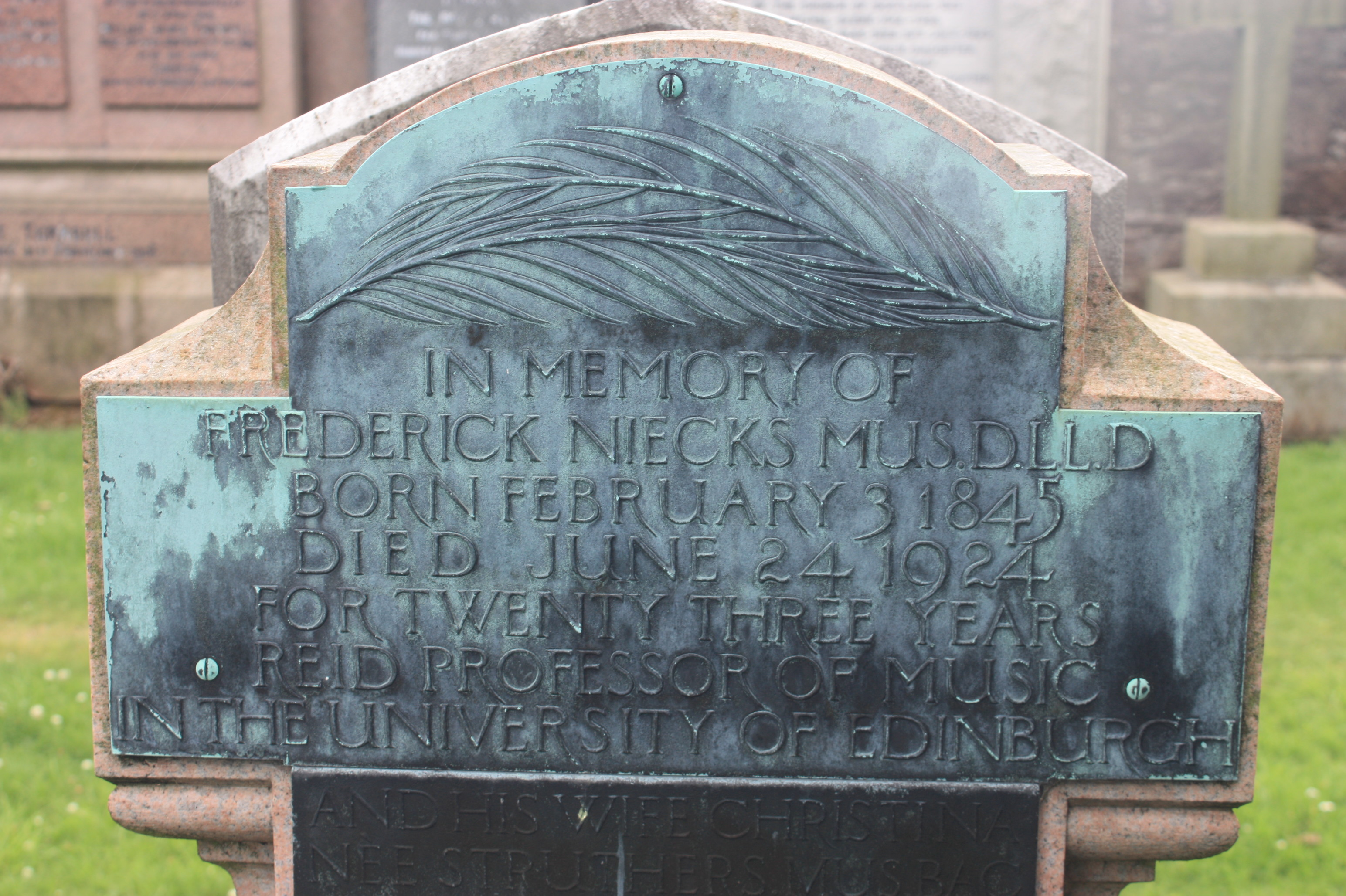
Grave of Frederick Niecks, Grange Cemetery

Friedrich Maternus Niecks was born in Düsseldorf, son of a conductor and teacher; his grandfather was a professional musician. He studied music under his father; he later studied violin under Leopold Auer and others, and studied piano and composition under Julius Tausch. At age 13 he made his debut playing Charles Auguste de Bériot's Violin Concerto No. 2, then joined the Musikverein orchestra, with whom he remained until age 21.

In 1868 he expressed a desire to move to Great Britain, and Alexander Mackenzie invited him to settle in Scotland, where he became viola player in Mackenzie's string quartet in Edinburgh and an organist and teacher in Dumfries. In 1879 he became a regular contributor to The Musical Times.

In 1884 he published a Concise Dictionary of Musical Terms, in two editions. In 1888 he published his magnum opus, Frédéric Chopin as Man and Musician, with a German edition coming out in 1889. This was the first comprehensive biography of Chopin.

In 1891 he was appointed Reid Professor of Music at the University of Edinburgh, which post he held until 1914. His activities there included leading a string quartet and presenting an annual series of historical concerts, in addition to his lecturing and teaching duties. His published musical papers included The Flat, the Sharp and the Natural; The Teaching of Musical History; A History of Programme Music from the 16th Century to the Present Time; and The Nature and Capacity of Modern Music.

He was created a Doctor of Music by Trinity College Dublin in 1898. In 1907, aged 62, he married the daughter of Sir John Struthers, Secretary of the Scottish Education Department.

In 1914, on the outbreak of World War I, he was required to return to Germany. He was succeeded as Reid Professor by Donald Tovey. He later returned to Edinburgh, where he died in 1924, aged 79. He is buried in Grange Cemetery near the south-east corner.

His widow Christina Niecks (1869-1942) edited his biography of Robert Schumann and published it the year after his death. She died in 1944; she bequeathed to the Edinburgh University Library her collection of Chopiniana, including letters written by Chopin, Franz Liszt and Clara Schumann.

== Reputation ==
In the 19th century, Niecks' reputation as a Chopin scholar was strong, but diminished in his later years. The Monthly Musical Record wrote in 1915: "His whole professional life has been one long big accident [including] the manner in which he first came to be regarded as the greatest living authority on Chopin". In recent years there are claims that "Niecks' sections on 1841–1849 and the posthumous years are flawed with half-truths, hearsay, misinformation, omissions, hints and puns", and that such inaccuracies have been copied and perpetuated by other writers.

Nevertheless, in 2011, the Fryderyk Chopin Institute, in Warsaw, Poland, published a Polish version of Niecks' Chopin biography.

== Sources ==
- Grove's Dictionary of Music and Musicians, 5th ed, 1954, Vol VI, p. 83-4
