= John Donaldson (music scholar) =

English music scholar and educator

John Donaldson (baptised 5 January 1789; died 12 August 1865) was an English music scholar and educator.

His father, John, was an organ builder operating in Newcastle upon Tyne and York. The younger Donaldson moved to Glasgow and opened a music academy in 1816, but in the 1820s qualified as an advocate and ceased teaching. He was nevertheless well-regarded as a pianist and produced a Sonata in G minor in 1822. He developed an interest in acoustics. According to The New Grove Dictionary of Music and Musicians, he first took an interest in the Reid Professorship of Music at the University of Edinburgh in 1838; the Oxford Dictionary of National Biography states that he first applied for the position in 1841. He was eventually appointed to it in 1845, and aimed to transform music teaching at the university. He purchased a large array of scientific equipment and instruments, established regular lecture series, and made acoustic experiments. But this was not achieved without opposition from the trustees of Reid's bequest; he spent five years engaged in legal proceedings to extract greater allowances to cover teaching, equipment and building space. He won, and the university was ordered to pay for a music room, which became the Reid School of Music. His health suffered under the stress of the legal proceedings, however, and he died in 1865.
