= The Bride of Dionysus =

The Bride of Dionysus is an opera by Donald Tovey, to a libretto by R. C. Trevelyan. It was written between 1907 and 1918, and premiered at the Empire Theatre, Edinburgh, on 23 April 1929.

== The Bride of Dionysus ==
The Bride is Tovey's only opera. It is based on the legends of Theseus, Ariadne, and the Minotaur. After its premiere, it received a few further performances in Edinburgh in 1929 and 1932. Although Fritz Busch enquired about the opera for performance at Glyndebourne Festival Opera, nothing came of this. Extracts from the opera were released on CD in 2010. The manuscript of the opera is at the Reid Music Library at Edinburgh University.
