= Essays in Musical Analysis =

Series of essays on classical music by Donald Tovey

- Author: Donald Francis Tovey
- Genre: Music
- Publication date: 1935

Sir Donald Francis Tovey's Essays in Musical Analysis are a series of analytical essays on classical music. The essays came into existence as programme notes, written by Tovey, to accompany concerts given (mostly under his own baton) by the Reid Orchestra in Edinburgh. Between 1935 and 1939, they were published in six volumes as Essays in Musical Analysis. Each volume focused on a certain genre of orchestral or choral music (for example, Volumes I and II were devoted to Symphonies; Volume III to Concertos), with many of the works discussed with the help of music examples. In 1944, a posthumous seventh volume appeared on chamber music. In 1989, a new version was published with some essays omitted and the remainder of Volumes I-VI consolidated into two volumes.

Tovey's Essays were written as introductory notes for the concert-going public and are occasionally light-hearted in tone. Nevertheless, they analyse the pieces and describe their structure in much more depth than standard programme notes, even in a few pages each. Tovey saw his role as being "counsel for the defence" (Introduction to Volume I): in speaking up on behalf of the work about to be performed, he was seeking to facilitate the listener's appreciation of its artistic content and technical merits. As a result, his approach tends to 'track' the structure of a work as it unfolds through time before the ear of his imaginary 'naive listener'.

- Volume 1: Symphonies. Includes essays on Beethoven's overtures and symphonies, including the author's famous study of the Ninth Symphony; all Brahms's overtures and symphonies; 11 symphonies by Haydn; six by Mozart; three by Schubert, three by Sibelius; four by Dvorak.
- Volume 2: Symphonies (II), variations, and orchestral polyphony. Schumann, Bruckner, Tchaikovsky, Julius Rontgen, Bach Orchestral Suites and Concertos, Vaughan Williams, Holst.
- Volume 3: Concertos. Analysis of concertos by Mozart, Haydn, Beethoven, Chopin, Joachim, Brahms, Dvorak, Elgar, Somervell, Franck, Dohnanyi, Spohr, Mendelssohn, Schumann, Saint-Saens, Bruch, Stanford, Delius, R. Strauss, Glazounov, Sibelius, Schmidt, Respighi and Walton.
- Volume 4: Illustrative music. Essays on works by Mozart, Beethoven, Schubert, Berlioz, Mendelssohn, Schumann, Wagner, Dvorak, Parry, Elgar (Falstaff), J B McEwen and Holst.
- Volume 5: Vocal music. Includes long essays on Bach's B minor Mass, Beethoven's Mass in D, Haydn's The Creation and Verdi's Requiem.
- Volume 6: Supplementary essays, glossary and index. CPE Bach, Mozart, Beethoven, Mendelssohn, Brahms, Reger, Mahler, Elgar, Sibelius, Havergal Brian.
- Volume 7: Chamber music. Essays on Bach's Goldberg Variations and The Art of Fugue as well as key works by Haydn, Mozart, Beethoven, Schumann, Chopin, and Brahms.
