= Reid Professor of Music =

The Reid Professorship in Music was a position founded within the University of Edinburgh in 1839 using funds provided in a bequest from General John Reid.

== History ==
On his death in 1807 General John Reid left a fortune of more than £50,000. Subject to the life-interest of his only daughter, who had married a Mr Robertson without his consent, he left this money to found a professorship of music in the University of Edinburgh, and to be further applied to the purchase of a library, or otherwise laid out in such a manner as the principal and professors of the university might think proper.

Accordingly, in 1839, after the daughter's death, the chair of music was founded. The fund had increased by that time to about £70,000; but the university authorities largely availed themselves of the discretion given to them in the application of the money. They diverted the bulk of it from the primary object to the further uses mentioned in Reid's will, and they fixed the professor's salary at £300, the minimum which he had named.

== List of professors ==
- Nigel Osborne (1989–2012)
- Kenneth Leighton (1970–1988)
- Sidney Newman (1941–1970)
- Donald Tovey (1914–1940)
- Frederick Niecks (1891–1914)
- Herbert Oakeley (1865–1891)
- John Donaldson (1845–1865)
- Henry Hugh Pierson (1843–1844) — elected but probably did not really teach
- Henry Bishop (1841–1843)
- John Thomson (1839–1841)
