= Donald Tovey =

British musicologist (1875–1940)

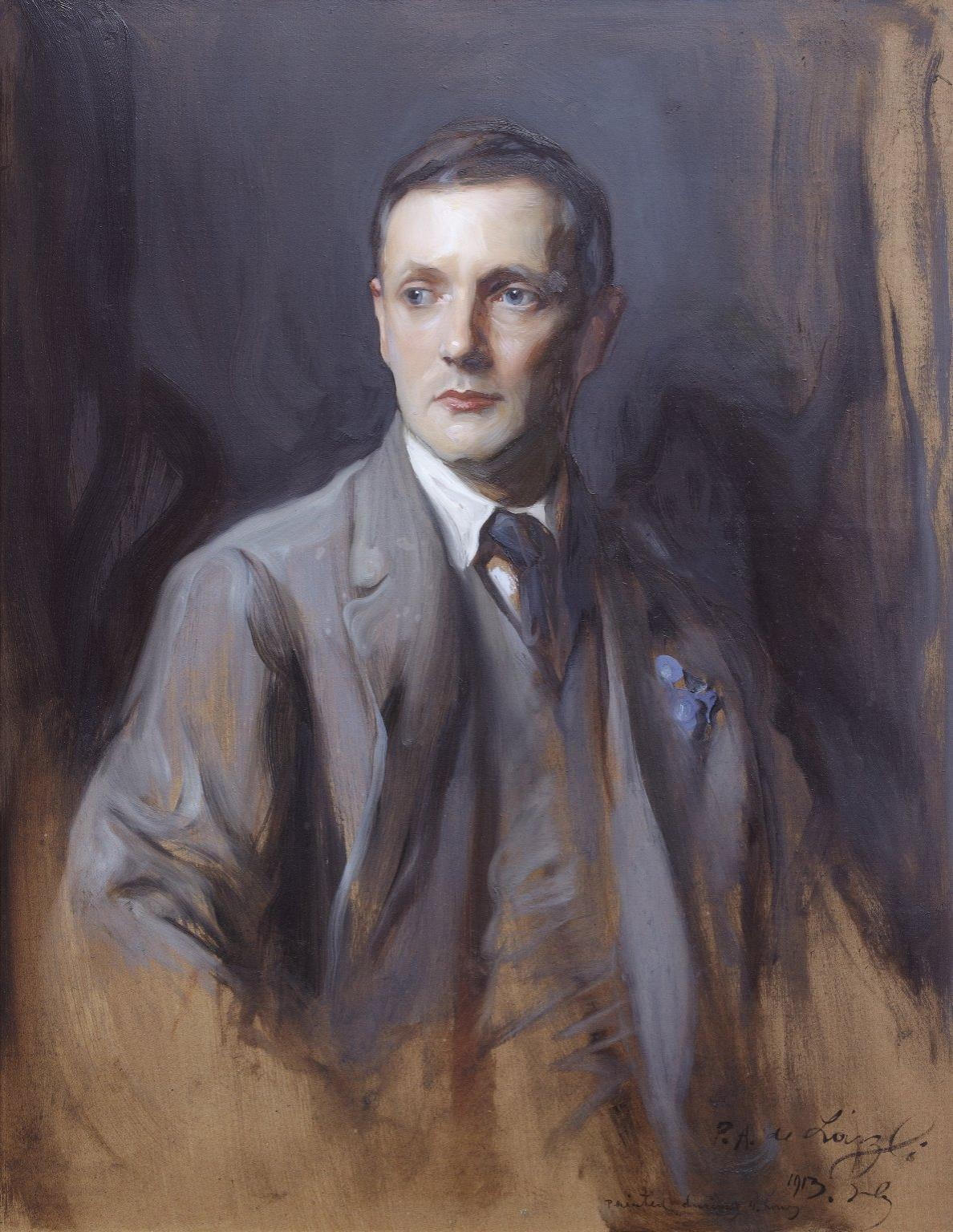
- Portrait by Philip de László, 1913
- Born: July 17, 1875; Eton, Berkshire, England
- Died: July 10, 1940 (aged 64); Edinburgh, Scotland

Academic work
- Discipline: Musicology
- Notable works: Essays in Musical Analysis

Sir Donald Francis Tovey (17 July 1875 – 10 July 1940) was a British music analyst, musicologist, writer on music, composer, conductor and pianist. He had been best known for his Essays in Musical Analysis and his editions of works by Bach and Beethoven, but since the 1990s his (relatively few) compositions have been recorded and performed with increasing frequency. The recordings have mostly been well received by reviewers.

== Life ==
He was born at Eton, Berkshire, the son of Duncan Crookes Tovey, an assistant master at Eton College, and his wife, Mary Fison. As a child Tovey was privately educated exclusively by Sophie Weisse. She was impressed by his musical gifts evident at an early age and took it upon herself to nurture him. Through her network of associates he was introduced to composers, performers and music critics. These included Walter Parratt, James Higgs and (from the age of 14) Hubert Parry for composition. In 1898, Tovey graduated from Balliol College at Oxford University, where he had studied the classics and developed his interest in music, particularly that of Bach.

When Tovey was seven or eight years old, he met violinist Joseph Joachim, another acquaintance of Weisse. Tovey played piano with the Joachim Quartet in a 1905 performance of Brahms's Piano Quintet, in F minor, Op. 34. By then Tovey was already composing and had gained some moderate fame, with works performed in Berlin, Vienna, and London. His large scale Piano Concerto (with Tovey as soloist) made its debut at Queen's Hall in November 1903 under the baton of Sir Henry Wood, and Tovey played it again in 1906 under Hans Richter.

During this period he also contributed heavily to the 1911 Encyclopædia Britannica, writing many of the articles on music of the 18th and 19th centuries.

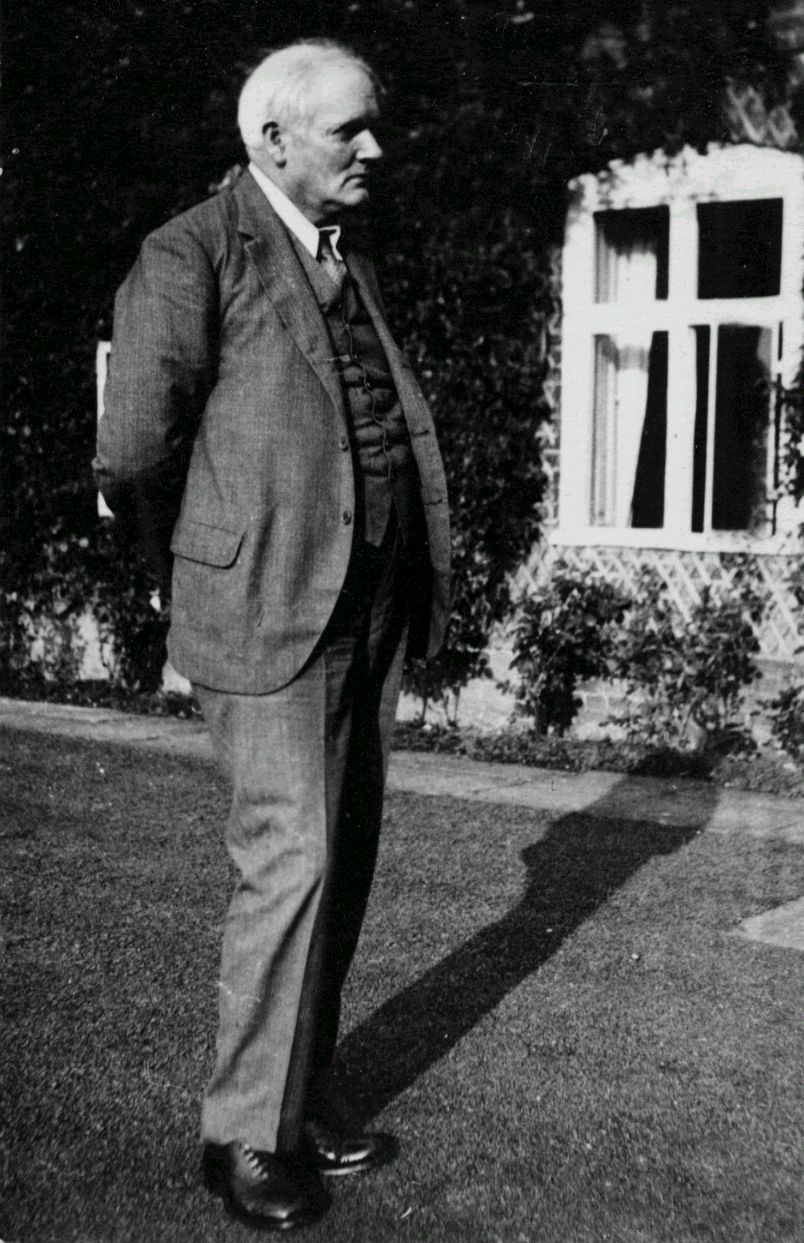
Tovey, c. 1938

In 1914, he began to teach music at the University of Edinburgh, succeeding Frederick Niecks as Reid Professor of Music; there he founded the Reid Orchestra. For their concerts he wrote a series of programme notes, many of which were eventually collected into the books for which he is now best known, the Essays in Musical Analysis. In 1917, he was elected a Fellow of the Royal Society of Edinburgh. His proposers were Ralph Allan Sampson, Cargill Gilston Knott, John Horne and Sir Edmund Taylor Whittaker.

As he devoted more and more time to the Reid Orchestra, to writing essays and commentaries and producing performing editions of Bach and Beethoven, Tovey composed and performed less often later in life; but the few major pieces he did complete are on a large scale, such as his Symphony of 1913 and the Cello Concerto completed in 1935 for his longtime friend Pablo Casals. Performing also became problematic. In illustrated radio talks recorded in his last few years, his playing is severely affected by a problem with one of his hands.

Tovey made several editions of other composers' music, including a 1931 completion of Bach's Die Kunst der Fuge (The Art of Fugue). His edition of the 48 Preludes and Fugues of Bach's The Well-Tempered Clavier, in two volumes (Vol. 1, March 1924; Vol. 2, June 1924), with fingerings by Harold Samuel, for the Associated Board of the Royal Schools of Music, has been reprinted continually ever since. His completion of the (presumed) final unfinished fugue in The Art of Fugue has nothing of pastiche about it, and in fact has often been recorded as the final piece of the set. His influential Essays in Musical Analysis based on his Reid Orchestra programme notes, were first published at this time, in six volumes between 1935 and 1939. They were edited by Hubert Foss of the Oxford University Press.

He was knighted by King George V in 1935, reportedly on the recommendation of Sir Edward Elgar, who greatly admired Tovey's edition of Bach. He died in 1940 in Edinburgh. His archive, including scores, letters, handwritten programme notes and annotations in the scores of others, is held by Heritage Collections at the University of Edinburgh library. In 2009 Richard Witts created a simple catalogue of the archival material available from the University on-line.

== Family ==
Tovey married his first wife, Margaret "Grettie" Cameron, the daughter of Hugh Cameron R.S.A., on 22 April 1916. In May 1919 they adopted an infant son, their only child, whom they named John Wellcome Tovey. Following a tumultuous relationship, in part strained by Cameron's mental health issues, the couple divorced in July 1922. She died a few years later. On the divorce from his first wife, Tovey's son John was placed under the guardianship of Weisse and Clara Georgina Wallace, who had also been a pupil of Weisse and known to Tovey since boyhood.

Clara Wallace and Tovey married on 29 December 1925. She became Lady Tovey upon his knighthood in 1935. They had a supportive marriage, often travelling together for Tovey's domestic and international engagements. They remained together until his death in 1940. Lady Tovey died in September 1944 at Hedenham Lodge, Norfolk.

== Compositions ==
From the start, the Teutonic heavy seriousness and traditional craftsmanship of Tovey's first concert works in the early 1900s felt somewhat old-fashioned amidst the early stages of the English Musical Renaissance, but they did find more favour on the continent. His official opus 1, the four movement Piano Trio in B minor was already composed on a large scale. It was completed in 1895 during Tovey's first term at Balliol and dedicated "to Sir Hubert Parry as the first work of a grateful pupil". There were other chamber works during this period, most of them including a piano part for Tovey to play himself: from 1900 he energetically promoted them through a series of regular chamber music performances. Early successes, receiving positive press notices, included the Piano Quintet in C, Op. 6, first performed at St James's Hall in London on 8 November 1900, and the Piano Quartet in E minor, Op. 12, played at the same hall on 21 November 1901. The Times judged him "a composer with serious aims and a very high standard", although the quartet "was written in a somewhat sombre vein".

His patron Sophie Weisse helped fund his concert appearances, and also financed the publication of his epic, but not overtly virtuosic Piano Concerto in A major, Op. 15 in 1903 (though significantly it was published in Germany, not in Britain). The Concerto, with its particularly expressive F♯ minor adagio movement, was first performed on 4 November 1903 by the Queen's Hall Orchestra, conducted by Sir Henry Wood, with Tovey himself as the soloist. (Tovey also performed Mozart's Piano Concerto in C major, K.503, at the same concert). It was successfully revived in 1906 under Richter, and again in 1913 in Aachen, Germany under Fritz Busch.

Weisse also funded the publication of Tovey's early chamber works between 1906 and 1913, including the two String Quartets, Opp. 23 and 24 (both composed in 1909) and his fourth and final Piano Trio in D major, Op. 27 of 1910. But the most significant new work after the Piano Concerto was another full-scale orchestral piece. The Symphony in D, Op.32, commissioned by Busch after the success of the Piano Concerto performance in Aachen, was written under great time pressure in 1913 and first performed in Aachen under Busch on 11 December 1913. A London performance (by the London Symphony Orchestra) followed on 31 May 1915. However, further performances were few. Tovey made small revisions in 1923. It was revived in Edinburgh and broadcast by the BBC on 25 February 1937 with the composer conducting the Reid Orchestra. A modern recording was not issued until 2006.

From 1914 his academic career took precedence over composition, although his sense of isolation from more modernist trends may also have contributed to the silence. The Bride of Dionysus, an ambitious music drama based on the Greek legend, was begun in 1907, using a text written by his friend R. C. Trevelyan. It took over ten years for Tovey to complete it, and then it had to wait a further decade before its premiere in 1929. There was very little else after that apart from the Cello Concerto, Op. 40, begun in 1933 for Pablo Casals, and first performed by him on 22 November 1934 in Usher Hall, Edinburgh. The Times described it as "a work of considerable power and beauty", but the subsequent London performances, on 11 and 12 November 1935, were ill-prepared and the press notices were negative. Famously, in reviewing a later Queen's Hall performance and broadcast on 17 November 1937 Constant Lambert commented that "the first movement...seemed to last as long as my first term at school".

== Tovey as a theorist of tonality ==
Tovey's belief that classical music has an aesthetic that can be deduced from the internal evidence of the music itself has influenced subsequent writers on music. In his essays, Tovey developed a theory of tonal structure and its relation to classical forms that he applied in his descriptions of pieces in his famous programme notes for the Reid Orchestra, as well as in more technical and extended writings. His aesthetic regards works of music as organic wholes, and he stresses the importance of understanding how musical principles manifest themselves in different ways within the context of a given piece. He was fond of using figurative comparisons to illustrate his ideas, as in this quotation from the Essays (on Brahms' Handel Variations, Op. 24, Tovey 1922):

The relation between Beethoven's freest variations and his theme is of the same order of microscopical accuracy and profundity as the relation of a bat's wing to a human hand.

Similarly in his book on Beethoven, dictated in 1936 but published posthumously in 1944:

We do not expect a return to the home tonic to be associated with a theme we have never heard before, any more than we expect on returning from our holiday to find our house completely redecorated and refurnished and inhabited by total strangers.

== Recordings ==
- Recordings of Tovey performing on piano were made for the National Gramophonic Society (NGS-114-117) on 6 and 11 June, and 4 September 1928, playing Tovey's conjectural completion of Bach's The Art of Fugue, Bach's Sonata No. 2 in A Major BWV1015 (1st mvt), and Beethoven's 10th Violin Sonata in G major, Op. 96 (complete) with violinist Adila Fachiri. The latter is the celebrated recording in which, on the first side after the first movement exposition, Tovey calls out, "Return to the beginning of the record; second time..." and then resumes playing, so that the listener can take the repeat or omit it, at her/his discretion. The Columbia recording of The Art of Fugue with the Roth String Quartet (1934–1935) has Tovey's conjectural completion of the work, played by Tovey on the piano, on the last 78 side.
- The Bride of Dionysus – Prelude and vocal extracts from the full opera Dutton Epoch CDLX 7241; also: Prelude. Toccata TOCC 0033
- Cello Concerto, Op. 40 (1935). Pablo Casals, soloist, BBC Symphony Orchestra, cond. Adrian Boult, rec. 1937, Symposium 1115; also: Alice Neary, Cello, Ulster Orchestra, cond. George Vass Toccata TOCC 0038
- Cello Sonata in F, Op. 4, Rebecca Rust (cello) & David Apter (piano), Marco Polo 8.223637
- Chamber Music Volumes 1, 2 and 3. Piano Trios op.1, op.8, Piano Quintet, Variations on a Theme by Gluck, London Piano Trio, Ormesby Ensemble, Toccata 0068, 0226. Complete Cello Sonatas, Alice Neary, cello, Kate Gould, cello, Gretel Dowdeswell, piano Toccata 0497
- Elegiac Variations for cello and piano, Op. 25, Alice Neary (cello) and Gretel Dowdeswell (piano) Toccata TOCC 0038
- Piano Concerto in A, Op. 15: Steven Osborne, piano; BBC Scottish Symphony Orchestra, cond. Martyn Brabbins, Hyperion CDA 67023
- Piano Trio, op. 27, Piano Quartet, op.12, Sonata Eroica, op.29 for solo violin, London Piano Trio. Guild GMCD 7352
- Sonata Eroica, op. 29 for solo violin, Rupert Marshall-Luck EM Records EMRCD079 (2023)
- String Quartet in G, op.23, Aria and Variations, op.11, Tippett Quartet, Guild GMCD 7346
- Symphony in D, Op. 32 (1913): Reid Orchestra, cond. Donald F. Tovey, rec. 25 February 1937. Symposium 1352; also: Malmö Opera Orchestra, cond. George Vass. Toccata TOCC 0033

== Selected publications ==
- Donald Francis Tovey (1931). A Companion to Beethoven's Pianoforte Sonatas (Complete Analyses). London, The Associated Board of The R.A.M. and The R.C.M.
- Sir Donald F. Tovey (1936) – Normality and Freedom in Music The Romanes Lecture Delivered in The Sheldonian Theatre 20 May 1936. Oxford, At the Clarendon Press.
- Sir Donald F. Tovey, editor, Forty-Eight Preludes and Fugues, JS Bach, 1924, published by (British) Associated Board of the Royal Schools of Music
