= Piano Quartet No. 2 =

Piano Quartet No. 2 may refer to:

- Piano Quartet No. 2 (Beethoven)
- Piano Quartet No. 2 (Brahms)
- Piano Quartet No. 2 (Dvořák)
- Piano Quartet No. 2 (Enescu)
- Piano Quartet No. 2 (Fauré)
- Piano Quartet No. 2 (Mendelssohn)
- Piano Quartet No. 2 (Mozart)
- Piano Quartet No. 2 (Oswald)
- Piano Quartet in B-flat major (Saint-Saëns)
