= Piano Quartet No. 1 =

Piano Quartet No. 1 may refer to:

- Piano Quartet No. 1 (Beethoven)
- Piano Quartet No. 1 (Brahms)
- Piano Quartet No. 1 (Dvořák)
- Piano Quartet No. 1 (Enescu)
- Piano Quartet No. 1 (Fauré)
- Piano Quartet No. 1 (Mendelssohn)
- Piano Quartet No. 1 (Mozart)
- Piano Quartet in E major (Saint-Saëns)
