= Piano quartet =

Chamber music composition for piano and three other instruments

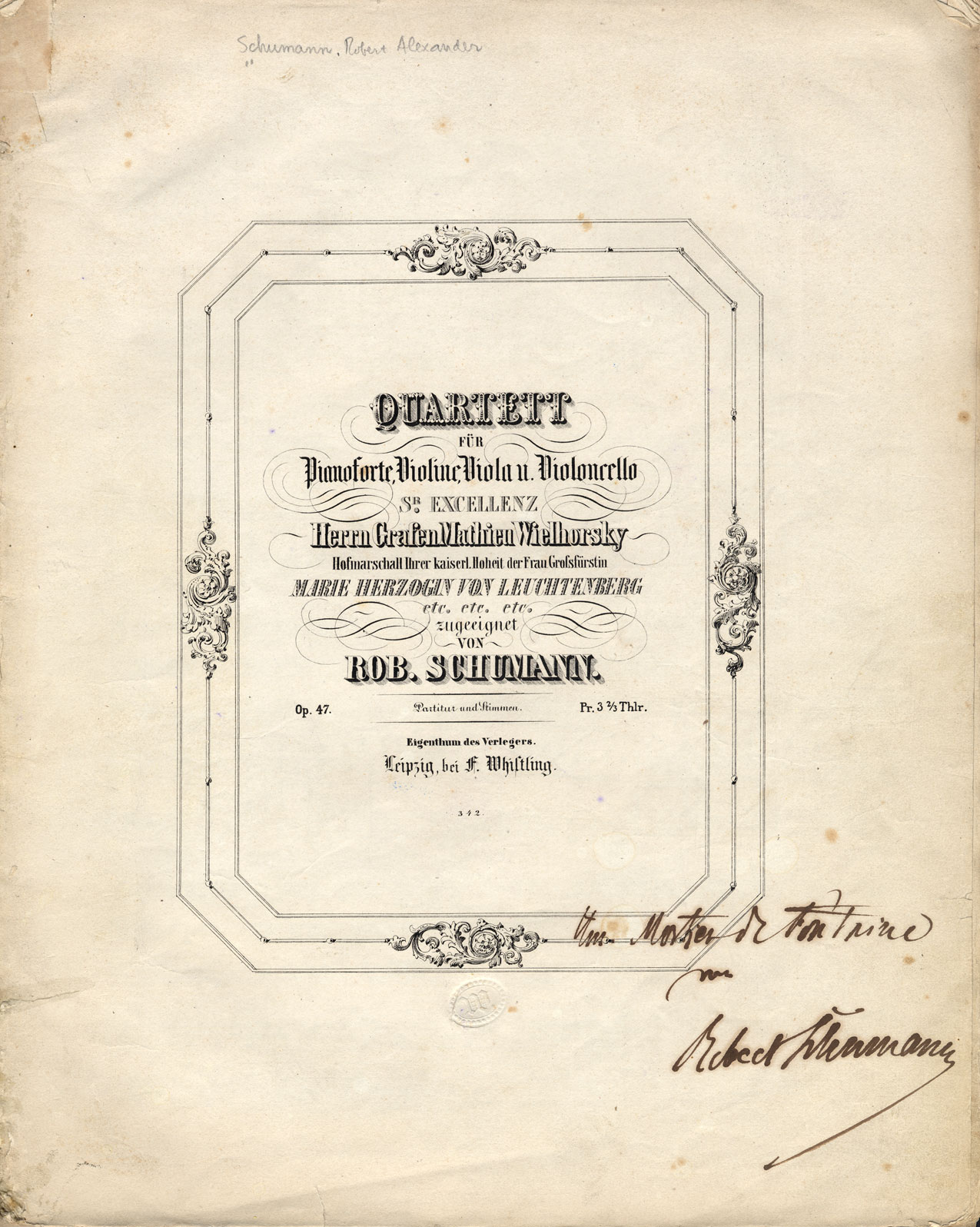
Title page of the first edition of Schumann's Piano Quartet (1845)

A piano quartet is a chamber music composition for piano and three other instruments, or a musical ensemble comprising such instruments. Those other instruments are usually a string trio consisting of a violin, viola and cello.

Piano quartets for that standard lineup were written by Wolfgang Amadeus Mozart, Robert Schumann, Ludwig van Beethoven, Johannes Brahms, Antonín Dvořák and Gabriel Fauré among others. In the 20th century, composers have also written for more varied groups, with Anton Webern's Quartet, opus 22 (1930), for example, being for piano, violin, clarinet and tenor saxophone, and Paul Hindemith's quartet (1938) as well as Olivier Messiaen's Quatuor pour la fin du temps (1940) both for piano, violin, cello and clarinet. An early example of this can be found in Franz Berwald's quartet for piano, horn, clarinet and bassoon from 1819, his opus 1.

A rare form of piano quartets consist of two pianos with two players at each piano. This type of ensemble is informally referred to as "eight-hand piano", or "two piano eight hands". Eight-hand piano was popular in the late 19th century before the advent of recordings as it was a mechanism to reproduce and study symphonic works. Music lovers could hear the major symphonic works all in the convenience of a parlour or music hall that had two pianos and four pianists. Many of the popular works of Mozart, Schumann, Brahms and Dvořák were transcribed for two piano eight hands. The majority of 8 hand piano music consists of transcriptions, or arrangements.

== List of works ==
The following is an incomplete list of piano quartets by famous and lesser-known composers. Ordering is by surname of composer.

=== A-B ===
- Elfrida Andrée
  - Piano Quartet A minor (1870)
- Henk Badings
  - Piano Quartet (1973)
- Jeanne Barbillion
  - Quatuor avec piano
- Béla Bartók
  - Piano Quartet in C minor (1898)
- Arnold Bax
  - Piano Quartet, in one movement (1922)
- Ludwig van Beethoven
  - Piano Quartet WoO 36, No. 1 in E♭ major (1785)
  - Piano Quartet WoO 36, No. 2 in D major (1785)
  - Piano Quartet WoO 36, No. 3 in C major (1785)
  - Opus 16/b: Piano Quartet in E♭ (1797) (arrangement of Quintet for Piano and Winds, Op. 16)
- Paul Ben-Haim
  - Piano Quartet in C minor, Op.4 (1920)
- Wilhelm Berger
  - Piano Quartet in A major, op. 21 (published 1887)
  - Piano Quartet in C minor, op. 100
- Charles Auguste de Bériot
  - Piano Quartet in A minor, Op. 50 (1881)
- Leopoldine Blahetka
  - Piano Quartet No. 1 in A major, Op. 43 (1836)
  - Piano Quartet No. 2 in E♭ major, Op. 44 (1837/38)
- Arthur Bliss
  - Piano Quartet in A minor (1915)
- Nancy Bloomer Deussen
  - Pacific City for Piano Quartet (2017)
- Léon Boëllmann
  - Piano Quartet in F minor, Op. 10 (c. 1890)
- William Bolcom
  - Piano Quartet (1976)
- Mélanie Bonis
  - Piano Quartet No. 1 in B♭ major, Op. 69 (1905)
  - Piano Quartet No. 2 in D major, Op. 124 (1927)
- Johannes Brahms
  - Piano Quartet No. 1 in G minor, Op. 25 (1859)
  - Piano Quartet No. 2 in A major, Op. 26 (1862)
  - Piano Quartet No. 3 in C minor, Op. 60 (1875)
- Charlotte Bray
  - Replay (2011)
  - Zustände (2016)
- Frank Bridge
  - Phantasy Piano Quartet in F♯ minor, H. 94 (1910)
- Dora Bright
  - Piano Quartet in D major (1893)
- James Francis Brown
  - Piano Quartet (2004)'

=== C-D ===
- Alexis de Castillon
  - Piano Quartet in G minor, Op.7 (1869)
- Georgy Catoire
  - Piano Quartet in A minor, Op.31 (1916)
- Ernest Chausson
  - Piano Quartet in A major, Op.30 (1897)
- Rhona Clarke
  - Undercurrent (2001)
- Osvaldo Coluccino
  - Eco immobile (2002)
- Aaron Copland
  - Piano Quartet (1950)
- Vincent d'Indy
  - Piano Quartet in A minor, Op.7 (1878–88)
- Tina Davidson
  - Barefoot (2011)
  - Leap (2020)
- Peter Maxwell Davies
  - Piano Quartet (2007)
- Emma Lou Diemer
  - Piano Quartet (1954)
- Ernst von Dohnányi
  - Piano Quartet in F♯ minor, (1894)
- Théodore Dubois
  - Piano Quartet in A minor (1907)
- Jan Ladislav Dussek
  - Piano Quartet in E♭ major (1804)
- Antonín Dvořák
  - Piano Quartet No. 1 in D major, Op. 23 (1875)
  - Bagatelles, Op. 47 (for two violins, cello and harmonium (or piano); 1878)
  - Piano Quartet No. 2 in E♭ major, Op. 87 (1889)

=== E-F ===
- Danny Elfman
  - Piano Quartet (2017)
- Rosalind Ellicott
  - Piano Quartet in D major (1895)
- George Enescu
  - Piano Quartet No. 1 in D major, Op. 16 (1909)
  - Piano Quartet No. 2 in D minor, Op. 30 (1943–1944)
- Gabriel Fauré
  - Piano Quartet No. 1 in C minor, Op. 15 (1876–79, Finale rev. 1883)
  - Piano Quartet No. 2 in G minor, Op. 45 (1885–86)
- Morton Feldman
  - Piano, Violin, Viola, Cello (1987)
- Zdeněk Fibich
  - Piano Quartet in E minor, Op. 11 (1874)
- Graciane Finzi
  - Free Quartet (1984)
- Elena Firsova
  - Frozen Time (2013-16)

- Eugénie-Emilie Juliette Folville
  - 1er Quatuor pour piano, Op. 9 (1885)
- Jacqueline Fontyn
  - Musica a quattro for piano quartet (1966)
- Arthur Foote
  - Piano Quartet in C major, Op. 23 (1890)
- Erika Fox
  - Malinconia Militare for Piano Quartet (2003)
- Richard Franck
  - Piano Quartet No.1 in A major, Op.33 (1901)
  - Piano Quartet No.2 in E major, Op.41 (1905)
- Carl Frühling
  - Piano Quartet in D major, Op. 35
- Robert Fuchs
  - Piano Quartet No. 1 in G minor, Op. 15 (1876)
  - Piano Quartet No. 2 in B minor, Op. 75 (1904)
- Vivian Fung
  - Shifting Landscapes (2018)

=== G-H ===
- Hans Gál
  - Piano Quartet in B♭ major, Op.13 (1914)
- Friedrich Gernsheim
  - Piano Quartet No. 1 in E♭ major, Op. 6 (1865)
  - Piano Quartet No. 2 in C minor, Op. 20 (performed in 2003. Pub. ca. 1870.)
  - Piano Quartet No. 3 in F major, Op. 47 (1883)
- Ruth Gipps
  - Brocade, Op. 17 (1941)
- Hermann Goetz
  - Piano quartet in E major Op. 6 (1867)
- Reynaldo Hahn
  - Piano Quartet in G major
- Ilmari Hannikainen
  - Piano Quartet in F♯ minor
- John Harbison
  - November 19, 1828 (1988)
- Robert Helps
  - Piano Quartet (1997)
- Louise Héritte-Viardot
  - Piano Quartet No. 1 in A major, Op. 9 (published in 1883)
  - Piano Quartet No. 2 in D major, Op. 11 (published in 1883)
  - Piano Quartet No. 3 in D minor (1877-1878)
- Heinrich von Herzogenberg
  - Piano quartet No.1 in E minor, Op. 75 (1891-1892)
  - Piano quartet No. 2 in B♭ major, Op. 95 (1897)
- Alfred Hill
  - The Sacred Mountain (1932)
- Wilhelm Hill
  - Piano Quartet in E♭ major, Op. 44 (1879)
- Ferdinand Hiller
  - Piano Quartet No. 1 in B minor, Op. 1 (1826)
  - Piano Quartet No. 2 in F minor, Op. 3 (1830)
  - Piano Quartet No. 3 in A minor, Op. 133 (1870)
- Franz Anton Hoffmeister
  - Piano Quartet in G major (1785)
  - Piano Quartet in B♭ major (1788)
- Herbert Howells
  - Piano Quartet in A minor, Op. 21 (1916-1st version, 1936-2nd version)
- Hans Huber
  - Piano Quartet No.1 in B♭ major, Op.110 (1891/2?)
  - Piano Quartet No.2 in E major, Op.117 (1901)
- Ferdinand Hummel
  - Piano Quartet in C♯ minor, Op. 19 (1879)
- Johann Nepomuk Hummel
  - Piano Quartet in G major, Op. post. (2 movements; published in 1839)
- William Hurlstone
  - Piano Quartet in E minor, Op. 43 (1906)

=== I-L ===
- Salomon Jadassohn
  - Piano Quartet 1 in C minor, Op.77 (1884)
  - Piano Quartet 2 in G major, Op.86 (1887)
  - Piano Quartet 3 in A minor, Op. 109 (1890)
- Marie Jaëll
  - Piano Quartet in G minor (1875)
- Gustav Jenner
  - Piano Quartet in F major (1905)
- Robert Kahn
  - Piano Quartet No. 1 in b minor, Op. 14 (1891)
  - Piano Quartet No. 2 in a minor, Op. 30 (1899)
  - Piano Quartet No. 3 in c minor, Op. 41 (1904)
- Hannah Kendall
  - Network Bed (2018)
- Friedrich Kiel
  - Piano Quartet No. 1 in a minor, Op. 43 (1866)
  - Piano Quartet No. 2 in E major, Op. 44 (1866)
  - Piano Quartet No. 3 in G major, Op. 50 (1867)
- Uuno Klami (1900-1961)
  - Piano Quartet in D major
- Arnold Krug
  - Piano Quartet in C minor, Op. 17 (1879)
- Friedrich Kuhlau
  - Piano Quartet No. 1 in C minor, Op. 32 (1820-1821)
  - Piano Quartet No. 2 in A major, Op. 50 (1822)
  - Piano Quartet No. 3 in G minor, Op. 108 (composed in 1829, published in 1833)

- Josef Labor
  - Piano Quartet in C major, Op.6 (1893)
- Paul Lacombe
  - Piano Quartet in C minor, Op. 101 (1904)
- Libby Larsen
  - Over, Easy (2009)
- Anne Lauber
  - Piano Quartet (1989)
- Luise Adolpha Le Beau
  - Piano Quartet in F minor, Op. 28 (1883-1884)
- Nicola Le Fanu
  - Miniature and Canon (2000)
- Helvi Leiviskä
  - Piano Quartet in A major, Op. 1 (1926)
- Guillaume Lekeu
  - Piano Quartet in B minor - (incomplete, first and second movement only; 1893)
- Jeanne Leleu
  - Quatuor pour piano et cordes (1922)
- Lowell Liebermann
  - Piano Quartet Op.114 (2010)
- Helene Liebmann
  - Grand Quatuor pour Pianoforte, Violon, Viola et Violoncelle in A♭ major, Op. 13
- Ruth Lomon
  - Shadowing for Piano Quartet (1993)
  - Running with the Wolves for Piano Quartet (1994)

=== M ===
- Alexander Mackenzie
  - Piano Quartet in E♭ major, Op. 11 (1873)
- Gustav Mahler
  - Piano Quartet in A minor (only 1st movement completed; 1876)
- Otto Malling
  - Piano Quartet in C minor, Op.80 (1904)
- Joan Manén
  - Piano Quartet Op. A-6 "Mobilis in mobili" (1901)
- Bevan Manson
  - Quartet for violin, viola, cello and piano (2007)
- Tera de Marez Oyens
  - Dublin Quartet (1989)
- Heinrich Marschner
  - Piano Quartet No. 1 in B♭ major, Op. 36 (1827)
  - Piano Quartet No. 2 in G major, Op. 158 (1853)
- Bohuslav Martinů
  - Piano Quartet, H. 287 (1942)
- Emilie Mayer
  - Piano Quartet in E♭ major
  - Piano Quartet in G major
- Selga Mence
  - Piano Quartet (2015)

- Fanny Hensel
  - Piano Quartet in A♭ major, H-U No. 55 (1822)
- Felix Mendelssohn
  - Piano Quartet in D minor (1821)
  - Piano Quartet No. 1 in C minor, Op. 1 (1822)
  - Piano Quartet No. 2 in F minor, Op. 2 (1823)
  - Piano Quartet No. 3 in B minor, Op. 3 (1825)
- Elena Mendoza
  - Nebelsplitter for Piano, Violin, Viola and Cello (2007/2008)
- Olivier Messiaen
  - Quatuor pour la fin du temps (for clarinet, violin, cello, and piano; 1941)
- Darius Milhaud
  - Piano Quartet, Op. 417 (1966)
- Bernhard Molique
  - Piano Quartet, Op. 71 in E♭ major (published 1870)
- Wolfgang Amadeus Mozart
  - Piano Quartet No. 1 in G minor, K. 478 (1785)
  - Piano Quartet No. 2 in E♭ major, K. 493 (1786)

=== N-R ===
- Eduard Nápravník
  - Piano Quartet in A minor, Op.42 (1882)
- Zygmunt Noskowski
  - Piano Quartet in D minor, Op. 8 (premiered in 1879, published in 1881)
- Vítězslav Novák
  - Piano Quartet in C minor, Op.7 (1894, rev. 1899)
- Cornélie van Oosterzee
  - Piano Quartet in C♯ minor (c. 1890)
- Henrique Oswald
  - Piano Quartet No. 1 (Piccolo quartetto) in F♯ minor, Op. 5 (1888)
  - Piano Quartet No. 2 in G major, Op. 26 (1898)
- Hubert Parry
  - Piano Quartet in A♭ major (1882)
- Dora Pejačević
  - Piano Quartet in D minor, Op. 25 (1908)
- Walter Piston
  - Piano Quartet (1964)
- Prince Louis Ferdinand of Prussia
  - Piano Quartet No. 1 in E♭ major (published 1806)
  - Piano Quartet No. 2 in F minor (published 1806)
- Ebenezer Prout
  - Piano Quartet in C major, Op.2 (1865 ca.)
  - Piano Quartet No.2 in F major, Op.18 (1882?)
- Osmo Tapio Räihälä
  - Les Oréades (2014)
- Santa Ratniece
  - feu sur glace (2019)
- Max Reger
  - Piano Quartet No. 1 in D minor, Op.113 (1910)
  - Piano Quartet No. 2 in A minor, Op.133 (1914)
- Carl Reinecke
  - Piano Quartet in E♭ major, Op.34 (1853)
  - Piano Quartet in D major, Op.272 (1904)
- Josef Gabriel Rheinberger
  - Piano Quartet in E♭ major, Op. 38 (1870)
- Ferdinand Ries
  - Piano Quartet in F minor, Op.13 (1808)
  - Piano Quartet in E♭ major, Op.17 (1809)
  - Piano Quartet in E minor No.3, Op.129 (1820 or 1822?)
- Amanda Röntgen-Maier
  - Piano Quartet in E minor (1891)
- Anton Rubinstein
  - Piano Quartet in C major, Op. 66 (1864)

=== S ===
- Camille Saint-Saëns
  - Piano Quartet in E major, Op. post (1851–53)
  - Serenade in E♭ major, Op. 15 (for violin, viola (or cello), organ, and piano; 1865)
  - Piano Quartet in B♭ major, Op. 41 (1875)
  - Caprice sur des airs danois et russes, Op. 79 (for flute, oboe, clarinet and piano; 1887)
  - Barcarolle in F major, Op. 108 (for violin, cello, harmonium, and piano; 1898)
- Leander Schlegel
  - Quartet for pianoforte, violin, viola and violoncello in C major, Op.14 (1908?)
  - Quartet for 2 violins, viola and violoncello in G major, Op.17 (1905)
- Alfred Schnittke
  - Piano Quartet, based on a fragment by Gustav Mahler (1988)
- Franz Schubert
  - Adagio and Rondo concertante in F major, D487 (1816)
- Georg Schumann
  - Piano Quartet in F minor, Op. 29 (1901)
- Robert Schumann
  - Piano Quartet in E♭ major, Op. 47 (1842)
- Cyril Scott
  - Piano Quartet in E minor, Op. 16 (1899)
- Johanna Senfter
  - Piano Quartet in E minor, Op. 11
  - Piano Quartet in D minor, Op. 112
- Eric Sessler
  - Piano Quartet (2004)
- Vache Sharafyan
  - "Adumbrations of the Peacock" for piano quartet (2003)
  - "Good-lights" four movements for piano quartet (2018)
- Caroline Shaw
  - Thousandth Orange (2018)
- Nikos Skalkottas
  - Scherzo for piano quartet (1939)
- Alice Mary Smith
  - Piano Quartet No. 1 in B♭ major (1861)
  - Piano Quartet No. 2 in E major
  - Piano Quartet No. 3 in D major (1864)
  - Piano Quartet No. 4 in G minor (1867)
- Linda Catlin Smith
  - Dark Flower (2020)
- Marcelle Soulage
  - Piano Quartet (1925)
- Charles Villiers Stanford
  - Piano Quartet No. 1 in F major, Op. 15 (1879)
  - Piano Quartet No. 2 in C minor, Op. 133 (1914)
- Johann Franz Xaver Sterkel
  - Piano Quartet in B♭ major, StWV 157 (ca. 1804)
- Richard Stöhr
  - Piano Quartet in D minor, Op.63
- Richard Strauss
  - Piano Quartet in C minor, Op. 13 (1884–1885)
- Rita Strohl
  - Quatuor pour piano et cordes en ré mineur (1891)
- Josef Suk
  - Piano Quartet in A min, Op.1 (1891)
- Ananda Sukarlan
  - Variations on C. Simanjuntak's "Tanah Tumpah Darahku" (2020)
- Freda Swain
  - The Sea (1938)

=== T-Z ===
- Dobrinka Tabakova
  - Goldberg Gymnopedie (2011)
- Josef Tal
  - Piano Quartet for violin, viola, cello & piano (1982)
- Sergei Taneyev
  - Piano Quartet in E major, Op. 20 (1906)
- Ferdinand Thieriot
  - Piano Quartet in E♭ major, Op.30 (1875)
- Anna S. Þorvaldsdóttir
  - Shades of Silence (for violin, viola, cello & harpsichord; version for violin, viola, cello & piano also available; 2012)
  - Piano Quartet (2017)
- Donald Tovey
  - Piano Quartet in E minor, Op. 12 (1913)
- Joan Tower
  - White Granite for Piano Quartet (2010)
- Eduard Tubin
  - Piano Quartet in C♯ minor, ETW 59 (1930)
- Joaquín Turina
  - Piano Quartet in A minor, Op. 67 (1931)
- Stefania Turkewich
  - Piano Quartet
- Gwyneth Van Anden Walker
  - Letters to the World (2001)
  - Earth and Sky for Violin, Viola, Cello, and Piano with Readers (2018)
- Joelle Wallach
  - Runes and Ritual
- William Walton
  - Piano Quartet in D minor
- Johann Baptist Wanhal
  - Piano Quartet in E♭ major, Op. 40 No. 1
  - Piano Quartet in G major, Op. 40 No. 2
  - Piano Quartet in B♭ major, Op. 40 No. 3
- Graham Waterhouse
  - Skylla and Charybdis (2014)
- Vilma von Webenau
  - Piano Quartet in E minor
- Carl Maria von Weber
  - Piano Quartet in B♭ major, J. 76 (1809)
- Judith Weir
  - Piano Quartet (2000)
- Charles-Marie Widor
  - Piano Quartet in A minor, Op. 66 (1891)
- John Williams
  - Air and Simple Gifts (2009)
- John Woolrich
  - Adagissimo (1997)
  - Sestina (1997)
- Georg Hendrik Witte
  - Piano Quartet in A major, Op. 5 (1867)
- Władysław Żeleński
  - Piano Quartet in C minor, Op. 61 (1907)

== List of ensembles ==
- Fauré Quartet
- Domus Quartet
- Garth Newel Piano Quartet
- Mariani Klavierquartett
- Tunnell Piano Quartet
- Copenhagen Piano Quartet
- Bohuslav Martinů Piano Quartet
- Bartholdy Piano Quartet
- Menuhin Festival Piano Quartet
- Berlin Piano Quartet
- Ames Piano Quartet
- Mozart Piano Quartet
- Amara Piano Quartet
- Frith Piano Quartet
- Ax, Ma, Laredo & Stern

== See also ==
- Classic 100 chamber (ABC)
- Mozart Piano Quartet
