= Piano Quartet in E-flat major =

Piano Quartet in E-flat major may refer to:

- Piano Quartet No. 2 (Mozart)
- Piano Quartet No. 1 (Beethoven)
- Piano Quartet (Schumann)
- Piano Quartet No. 2 (Dvořák)
