= Piano Quartet in D major =

Piano Quartet in D major may refer to:

- Piano Quartet No. 2 (Beethoven)
- Piano Quartet No. 1 (Dvořák)
- Piano Quartet No. 1 (Enescu)
