= Mozart Piano Quartet =

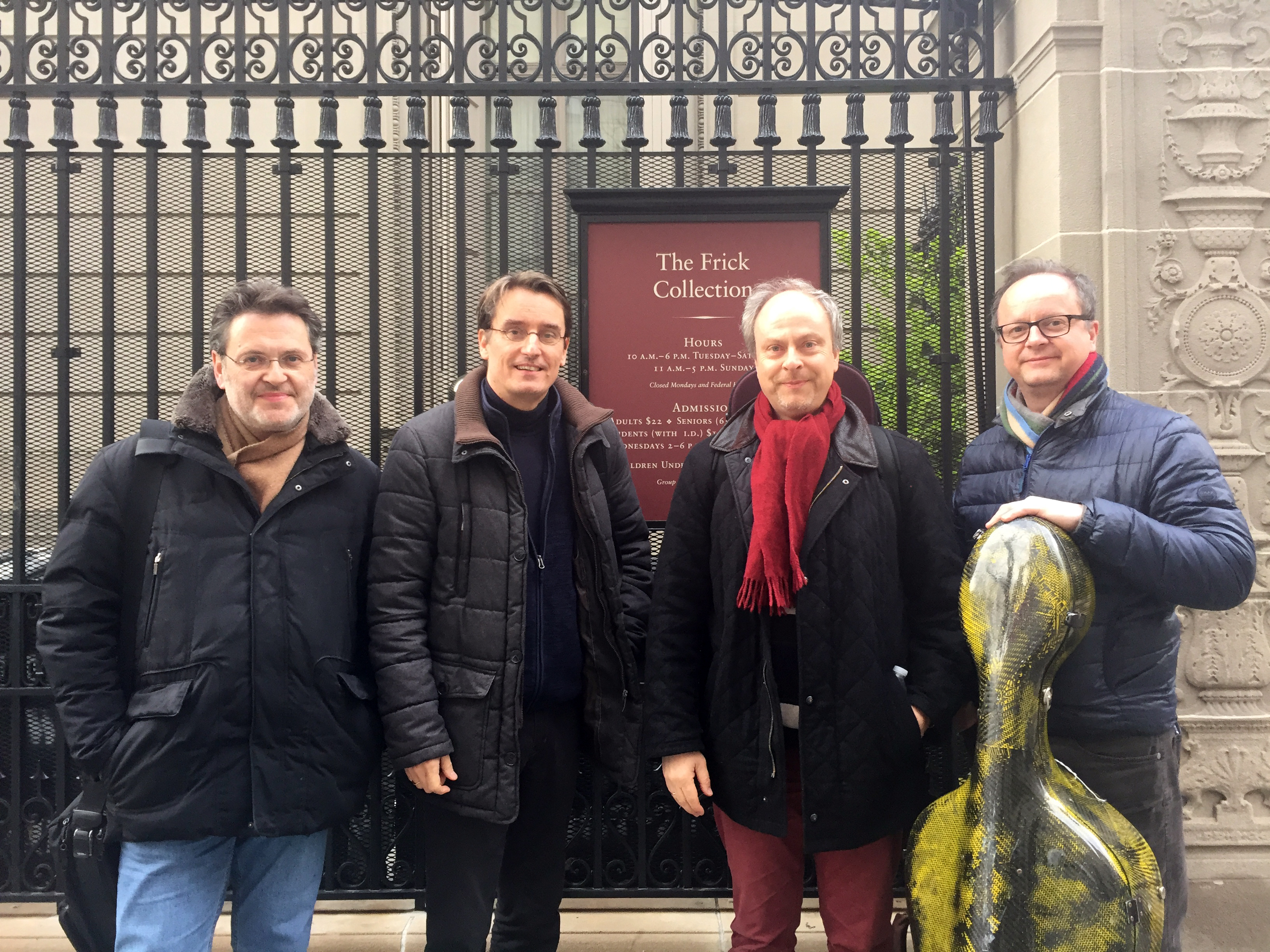
- Mozart Piano Quartet at the Frick Collection in New York, 2018

Background information
- Origin: Germany
- Genres: Classical
- Occupation: piano quartet
- Instruments: 1 piano, 1 violin, 1 viola, 1 cello
- Years active: 2000–present
- Members: Paul Rivinius; Mark Gothoni; Hartmut Rohde; Peter Hoerr
- Website: mozartpianoquartet.com

The Mozart Piano Quartet is a classical music piano quartet founded in 2000 in Germany. The members are pianist Paul Rivinius, violinist Mark Gothoni, violist Hartmut Rohde, and cellist Peter Hoerr, who are all internationally prize-winning soloists.

== History ==
The Mozart Piano Quartet plays a wide range of classical music, and has recorded works by composers such as Beethoven (The Piano Quartet Op. 16 and the Eroica Symphony arranged by Ferdinand Ries), the quartets of Richard Strauss and Antonín Dvořák, as well as the multi award-winning premiere recordings of the great piano quartets by Mélanie Bonis, and Camille Saint-Saëns, which won 'Best Chamber America', 'Editors's Choice' in Gramophone Magazine. There have, as well, been many live radio broadcasts, recordings and productions in places like Germany, the United States, Spain, Italy, Brazil, and Australia.

The Mozart Piano Quartet regularly performs in major festivals and venues in the United States, Europe, and the Far East. These have included Lincoln Center for the Performing Arts, Wigmore Hall, Melbourne Festival, Mahler Festival, and the Concertgebouw in Amsterdam. Their regular tours to North and South America include well-known concert halls in New York, Washington, Los Angeles, Boston, Chicago, and Philadelphia as well as in the halls in Brazil, Colombia, Peru, Mexico, and Canada.

== Members ==
=== Piano ===
- Tamara Cislowska (2000-2004)
- Paul Rivinius (2004–present)

=== Violin ===
- Natalie Chee (2000-2004)
- Mark Gothoni (2004–present)

=== Viola ===
Hartmut Rohde

=== Violoncello ===
Peter Hoerr

== Discography (2000-2018) ==
The Mozart Piano Quartet records exclusively for the German label Dabringhaus & Grimm (MDG)

- Piano Quartet and Horn Quintet by H.G.Witte by January 2018 (2018), MDG
- Schumann / Brahms: Piano Quartets (2011)
- Mozart - Piano Quartets KV478 & KV493 (2009)
- Saint-Saëns - Piano Quartets (2009)
- Bonis - Piano Quartets (2008)
- Beethoven - Chamber music (2007)
- Strauss - Piano Quartet Op. 13 (2005)
- Dvorák - Piano Quartets Op.23 & Op.87 (2003)
- Jenner - Complete Chamber Works (2002)
- Mozart - Piano Quartets KV 478 & KV 493 (2002)
- Brahms - Piano Quartets Op. 26 & Op. 60
