= Piano Quartet in B-flat major (Saint-Saëns) =

Piano Quartet by Camille Saint-Saëns

Piano Quartet in B♭ major
- Piano quartet by Camille Saint-Saëns
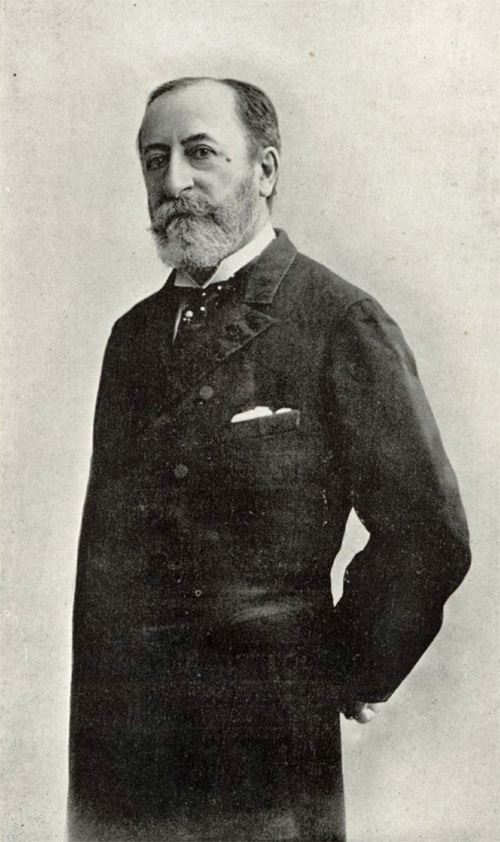
- Saint-Saëns c. 1880
- Key: B♭ major
- Opus: 41
- Composed: February 1875
- Dedication: Jules Foucault
- Published: October 1875 (Durand)
- Movements: four
- Scoring: piano; violin; viola; cello

Premiere
- Date: 6 March 1875
- Location: Salle Pleyel, Paris
- Performers: Camille Saint-Saëns; Pablo de Sarasate; Alfred Turban; Léon Jacquard

The Piano Quartet in B♭ major, Op. 41, also known as the Piano Quartet No. 2, was written by Camille Saint-Saëns in February 1875. Dedicated to Jules Foucault, it was premiered on 6 March 1875 in Paris. It has been called one of Saint-Saëns' neglected masterpieces and is in the core repertoire of the piano quartet.

== History ==
The Piano Quartet in B♭ major is preceded by a Piano Quartet in E major, which Saint-Saëns had written more than 20 years earlier, but remained unpublished until 1992. The Piano Quartet in B♭ major was written in February 1875, an eventful year that marked his marriage to Marie-Laure Truffot and the birth of his son André, the composition of Le Déluge and the fourth piano concerto, and the premiere of Danse macabre.

The work was dedicated to Jules Foucault and was premiered on 6 March 1875 at Salle Pleyel with the composer on the piano, Pablo de Sarasate (violin), Alfred Turban (viola), and Léon Jacquard (cello). It has been arranged for piano duet by Auguste Horn (1877) and for two pianos by Jules Griset (1910).

== Structure ==
External audio
- Performed by the Fine Arts Quartet and Cristina Ortiz
- I. Allegretto
- II. Andante maestoso ma con moto
- III. Poco allegro più tosto moderato
- IV. Allegro

The piano quartet consists of four movements, which are cyclical in nature.

1. Allegretto
2. Andante maestoso ma con moto
3. Poco allegro più tosto moderato
4. Allegro

The first movement features two themes of differing character: the first is more improvisational, interchanging between the piano and the strings, while the second is more lyrical.

The slow second movement in G minor features a rhythmic motif driven by the piano and a chorale-like motif in the strings developed in fugal lines.

The third movement is a scherzo in rondo form.

The finale is a fantasy-like movement with contrapuntal elements. It references the first theme from the slow movement in the recapitulation, and the two themes of the opening movement in the coda, joined by the chorale-like theme of the slow movement.

== Legacy ==
Jeremy Nicholas has called the Piano Quartet a neglected masterpiece, alongside the Septet and the Violin Sonata No. 1. Today it is part of the standard repertoire of the piano quartet.
