= Piano Quartet No. 3 (Brahms) =

Piano Quartet by Johannes Brahms

Piano Quartet in C minor
- No. 3
- Chamber music by Johannes Brahms
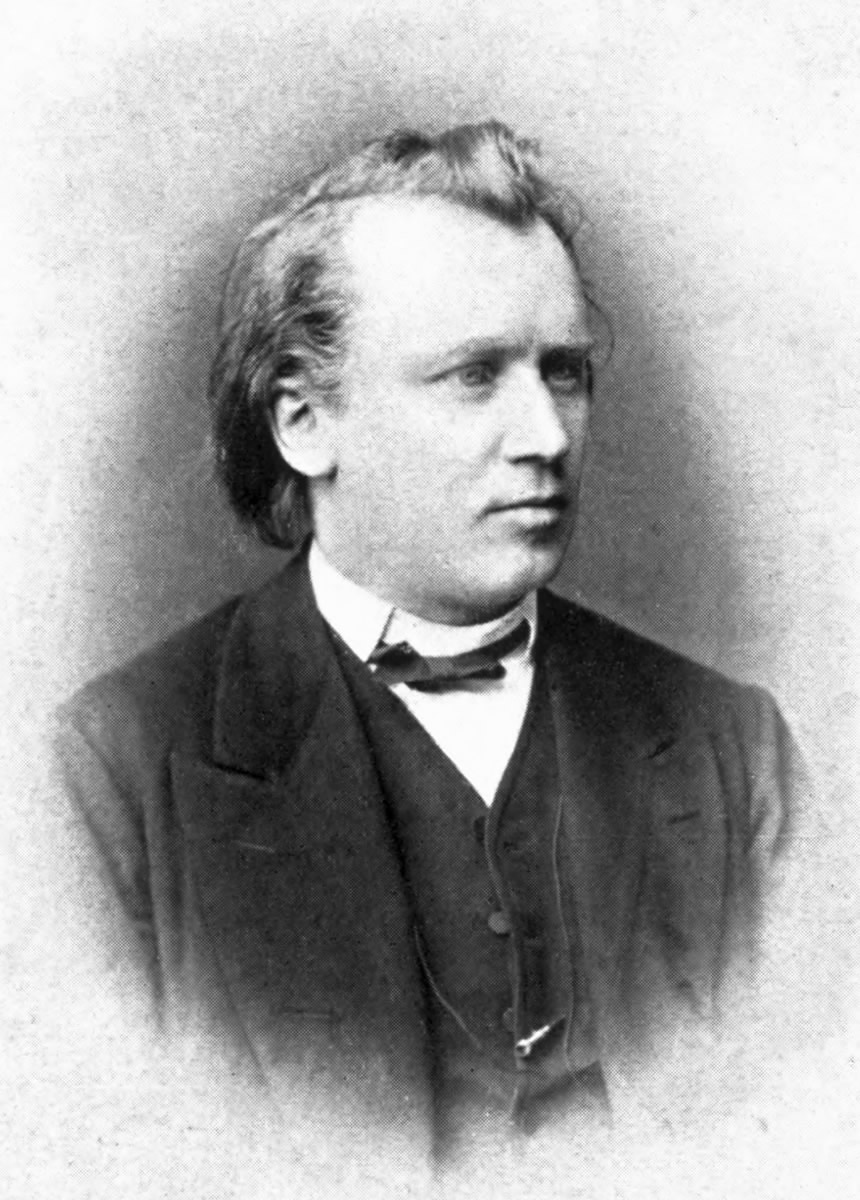
- The composer c. 1872
- Other name: Werther Quartet
- Opus: 60
- Composed: 1875
- Movements: four
- Scoring: violin; viola; cello; piano

The Piano Quartet No. 3 in C minor, Op. 60, completed by Johannes Brahms in 1875, is scored for piano, violin, viola and cello. It is sometimes called the Werther Quartet after Goethe's The Sorrows of Young Werther. The premiere took place in Vienna on November 18, 1875, as part of the Hellmesberger Quartet's opening concert of the season. Brahms was the pianist. Richard Wagner and his wife Cosima were in attendance.

== Music ==
The quartet is in four movements:

1. Allegro non troppo (C minor)
2. Scherzo: Allegro (C minor → C major)
3. Andante (E major)
4. Finale: Allegro comodo (C minor → C major)

=== I. Allegro non troppo ===
The first movement is a sonata-form movement in C minor in triple meter. It begins with the piano playing bare octaves on C. The violin, viola, and violoncello then play the first theme, consisting of two sighing gestures of a descending minor second, followed by a descending theme. Some have speculated that the sighing motive is a musical utterance of the name "Clara", in reference to Clara Schumann, the composer, pianist, and lifelong friend and love interest of Brahms. More clear is Brahms's transposed version of Robert Schumann's "Clara theme", found in various pieces such as his Bunte Blätter, Op. 99 (1841), on which both Clara and Brahms wrote sets of piano variations. The Clara theme (C–B–A–G♯–A, often transposed: here E♭–D–C–B–C) was first detected by Eric Sams in his essays and books on Schumann and Brahms. In his 1971 essay “Brahms and his Clara Themes”, Sams writes on the “Clara content” in op. 60: “The first sentence of that autobiographical work is doubly expressive of Clara. Furthermore, there is direct evidence that this melodic form actually embodied her, for Brahms as for Schumann.”

After the first statement of the theme, the piano plays octaves on B♭. The opening motives, again played by the strings, becomes more chromatic and unsettling, until finally coming to rest on the dominant of C, G major. The viola and violin play pizzicato octaves on E♮ before the strings cascade down the C harmonic minor scale that ushers in the first theme, stated forte. After a brief development of this theme, an ascending gesture based on sixteenth-notes alternating between the notes of a minor second serves as the transition to the second theme in the relative major of C minor, E♭ major. This second theme is an uplifting eight-measure theme stated initially in the piano alone. Brahms then uses the technique of theme and variations to construct four variations on this theme, each eight measures long. A short idea based on the opening theme closes the exposition, which is not repeated.

The development section begins by restating the theme from measures 32–35 in E♭ minor. This moves to B major for a new fortissimo idea (perhaps a variation) based on the same theme. The quartet's opening sighing motives become developed in an E minor passage that incorporates a triplet figure on the second beat of the measure, and eventually the previous B major idea is restated identically in G major. The second theme from the exposition is then treated in imitative (almost canonic) counterpoint in C minor. After the beginning of the third contrapuntal treatment of this theme, a dominant pedal is sustained in octaves on G. This resolves unexpectedly to an A♭ major chord that is quickly brought down to C minor by the opening sighing motive in the piano.

The sighing motive indicates the beginning of the recapitulation. Rather than affirming the tonic of C minor, however, Brahms takes the recapitulation in a different direction: the opening section again ends on a dominant pedal on G with the violin and viola playing pizzicato octaves on E♮, but the E♮ is used to turn the music to E minor. Chromatic descent is employed to bring the music to a half-cadence on D, leading to the second theme in G major. This is perhaps the only sonata form movement in the minor mode in which the recapitulation features the second subject in the key of the major dominant. The second theme is first stated by the viola, which is then followed by three new variations (the first being played by the violin, the second and third by the piano), and one of the same variations as the exposition. A fifth variation leads to a short digression in C major but becomes chromatic and ends with a development the first theme, coming to a cadence on C. This is followed by a brief coda that expands on the first motives heard in the piece. Nevertheless, the key of C minor is arguably not clearly established by the recapitulation (the key signature of C minor is present at the end of the movement for less than two complete pages). The movement ends with a clear tonic–dominant–tonic perfect cadence, stated piano. The expansive and exploratory nature of the movement, along with the quiet closing dynamic, helps make the conventional final cadential progression appear mysterious.

=== II. Scherzo: Allegro ===
The second movement is a tempestuous scherzo (ternary form) in compound duple meter in C minor, the same key as the first movement. Donald Francis Tovey argues that Brahms puts the scherzo in the same key as the first movement because the first movement does not sufficiently stabilize its own tonic and requires the second movement to "[furnish] the tonal balance unprovided for by the end of the first movement." Although it is the shortest scherzo of Brahms's piano quartets, it is formally and tonally very complex.

The movement begins with an opening motif of a descending octave on G and a rising minor second to A♭ stated by the piano, followed by a falling diatonic line accompanied by the strings. The first theme, which clearly derives from the opening motif, is immediately by the solo piano played after this and Brahms uses the technique of developing variation to expand this theme. Most melodic ideas can be traced to the opening motif or the ascending minor second of the opening motif, which, notably, is the inversion of the descending sighs of the introduction of the first movement. This scherzo is very chromatic and unstable tonally, although it does actually move to a secondary phrase on the dominant and returns to the tonic with frequency. The scherzo ends with a pedal on the tonic C minor.

The middle section is not demarcated by the title of trio as are the middle sections of the scherzi from Brahms's previous two piano quartets. Moreover, this middle section serves more as a section of contrasting material than as a structural contrast—it maintains the same key signature, time signature, and tempo as the scherzo, is not musically marked off in any clear way, and even develops the same themes as the scherzo. One may argue whether it is in fact a trio at all, as nineteenth century composers knew it. Nonetheless, the middle section begins with a new theme, an ascending line in quarter notes in the strings, accompanied by a descending triplet figure played by the piano. This instrumentation is soon reversed and earlier themes from the scherzo become further developed. The transition back to the scherzo develops and rhythmically diminishes the opening motif of the scherzo and is the most chromatic, rhythmically complex, loud, and dramatic section of the movement. The scherzo is repeated almost entirely, however, the section immediately preceding the tonic pedal is omitted and replaced with a climactic dominant chord in a very high register in the strings, ending with a tierce de picardie on C major with three loud declamations of the tonic major chord.

=== III. Andante ===
The Andante is in a modified ternary form: ABCA′ with a coda. This is the only movement of the quartet that is not in C minor, and it is in the key of E major, a remote key in the context of C minor. This can be explained by its origin as the slow movement to a piano quartet in C♯ minor, which Brahms revised and published as Op. 60 in C minor. The key of E major is easily explained in the tonal context of C♯ minor, but the key choice of this movement was not revised as was the first movement; it should also be noted that the slow movement to Brahms's Symphony No. 1 in C minor is also in E major.

The Andante begins with a luscious melody played by the violoncello in its upper register (Theme A) with only the piano as accompaniment, clearly inspired by Schumann's Piano Quartet, where a similarly sumptuous melody opens the slow movement. The opening thematic material of this melody is a sequence of descending thirds, a gesture frequently used by Brahms (such as in his Op. 119, No. 1, and the opening to Symphony No. 4, to name two examples). The violin eventually joins in with a new melody over the cello. The viola enters later with a tutti descending stepwise idea. The A section, which is itself in a sort of AAB form, ends in the conventional dominant key of B major.

The B section (in ABAB form) begins with a syncopated ascending stepwise melodic line in the violin to be played molto dolce (Theme B). The piano begins to gain prominence with a distorted version of the opening cello line, played symmetrically across the piano (Theme C). Another theme developed in the B section is a falling line with dotted rhythms (Theme D).

The third section begins in B major but is highly chromatic. The piano plays a version of Theme B in broken octaves under consistent eighth-notes played by the violin and viola. This figure ends with a version of Theme C in broken octaves in the piano. This alternates with the string section, which develops Theme C. The piano rejoins and develops Themes C and D with the strings in E minor, but soon the violin plays Theme D over the other strings. At this point, the strings alternate with the piano, which plays Theme D in an unstable harmonic palette in broken octaves, while the strings play a combination of Themes C and D. This passage of alternating instruments moves from E minor to C minor to G♯ minor back to E major in the reprise of the A section.

The only significant differences between the first and second A sections are that in the second, the piano moves in triplets, there is a full string texture almost entirely throughout (often using pizzicato), and the piano begins the theme (although it is soon replaced by the cello). The coda is introduced by a new chord progression in the first tutti idea and by a solo cello line. Theme B is presented first by the viola and then by the violin, and the movement ends with the first measure of Theme A, stated first by the cello and then by the piano, concluding with a pianissimo affirmation of the tonic.

=== IV. Finale: Allegro comodo ===
The finale is a sonata-allegro in C minor in cut time with a secondary subject in E♭ major. The tempo is Allegro comodo and the exposition is repeated. The piano accompaniment for the first theme, stated immediately in measure 1, is derived from the opening piano line of Felix Mendelssohn's Piano Trio in C minor, Op. 66, movement 1. Mendelssohn's Piano Trio also features a quotation of a chorale melody taken from the sixteenth-century Genevan psalter 'Vor deinen Thron tret ich hiermit' (“Before Your Throne I Now Appear”). Vincent C. K. Cheung has also observed that the opening G–E♭ motion in the violin, coupled with the G–G–G–C in the piano greatly points toward the “Fate theme” in Beethoven's Fifth Symphony. Brahms's piece thus operates on multiple levels of reference (both literary and musical) and quotation.

The movement begins with the violin playing a theme above piano accompaniment. Both lines are separate themes that are developed individually throughout the movement, but they are similar in one major respect: both are constructed of three ascending notes preceded by a pickup, which go to a neighbor tone of the highest note and move back to that note. The essential notes of the violin theme are B–C–D–E♭–F–E♭, and the essential notes of the piano theme are: G–C–E♭–G–F♯–G (the rest of the piano theme is a descending sequence of ascending seconds: G–A♭–F–G–E♭–F–D–E♭). Therefore, the violin line uses an upper neighbor tone while the piano line uses a lower neighbor tone. This is crucial for understanding Brahms's development of the thematic ideas of this movement.

The violin melody is halting and primarily diatonic, played over an energetic piano accompaniment. It moves from C minor to G minor, although it ends with a change of mode to G major. After this, the violin plays a descending stepwise melody, which under close inspection is revealed to be an inversion of its own original theme (from B–C–D–E♭–F–E♭ to G–F–E♭–D–C–B) in successive quarter notes. The viola and cello soon accompany this figure. This builds up until measure 39, where a thunderous theme erupts in all instruments. This moves quickly to an idea constructed in triplets. Tonally, this passage is in C minor, and the final progression ends with an alternation between B-diminished and A♭ major. The piano plays a broken A♭ major chord, followed by a broken A♭ minor chord that is used to make a transition to E♭ major.

The section in the relative major begins with a theme clearly composed from the theme of the piano's accompaniment, in this case stated by the violin and viola moving in unison over a piano accompaniment based on the previous broken chordal figure. This briefly exchanges with a cello countermelody. When the violin and viola soar to an unexpectedly high register, the piano interrupts by playing an explosive broken dominant seventh chord. The strings respond by a piano, homophonic, homorythmic theme to be played mezza voce (medium voice). This idea is taken directly from the opening string theme of the first movement. Rather than accompanying this theme, the piano plays a descending broken chord after each utterance. The exposition ends in E♭ major, and Brahms indicates that it should be repeated.

The development begins with an exploration of the descending third that begins the violin's opening theme; when sequenced, this produces a series of descending thirds that recalls the opening theme of the third movement (G♯–E–C–A). The piano accompanies this with its initial theme. Brahms quickly eliminates accidentals from the key signature as the piece progresses to D major and A minor. Interspersed are descending chromatic phrases played by the piano. In measures 117–118, the cello introduces a new four-note idea (E–F–D–E) played pizzicato underneath the piano. This idea is taken from the second half of the first piano theme (G–A♭–F–G). The viola plays the opening of the piano's first theme, which resembles an inversion of the sequenced thirds developed moments earlier. Brahms repeats this pattern almost exactly, moving from A minor to E minor to B minor. In B minor, the piano develops its initial theme to a greater extent. This part of the development section is concluded by syncopated phrases by the viola and piano, which echo the second half of the piano's first theme in B minor.

Austrian musicologist and educator Karl Geiringer has shown that the next section (measures 155–188) is an insertion "in order to mitigate the excessive conciseness of this movement." Later insertions were atypical of Brahms because of his "striving after compression," and it seems that he "for once overshot the mark." The later addition explains the motion away from B minor, only to return to the key some thirty measures later. This section continues with the homorhythmic theme in G major, then in E♭ major. What follows is a quick (Tempo I) development of the initial piano theme in C minor, with all strings playing the opening four notes (moving in the often used progression i – I – iv). This exact sequence is used again in the coda to turn the movement from the minor mode to major. A dominant seventh chord in C minor is used as a pivot chord to return to B minor (a similar progression is used in Brahms's Ballade, Op. 118, No. 3, in which a dominant seventh chord built on G moves abruptly to B major). The violin develops its initial theme in B minor and then D minor with all three string instruments. The final notes of the theme (F–E♭) are sequenced and inverted repeatedly, recalling the significance of descending seconds in the first movement of this quartet. This moves from D minor to G minor to C minor. The end of the development section sees a very high and prolonged A♭, which parallels the end of the development section of the first movement.

The recapitulation, which reinstates the key signature of C minor, begins with the initial violin theme stated forte by all strings, accompanied by the piano playing broken octaves in triplets, outlining the main notes of its theme. After the first statement, the piano resumes its original accompaniment and the strings are reduced to a piano dynamic. This proceeds similarly to the exposition, albeit with the themes developed more extensively. Notably, the music turns toward G minor more strongly and the key signature changes to C major, as the relative major section from the exposition is in the tonic major in the recapitulation. The rest of the recapitulation is nearly identical to the exposition, ending in C major.

The coda begins at measure 311, with the piano loudly declaring the homorhythmic theme, alternating with the strings. The violin theme is then played by the strings in C major, but it soon shifts back to C minor (the key signature too returns). The four-note idea from the development section comes back, this time with its first note removed. The chromatic descending scale in the piano, an abbreviation of the violin theme in the viola, the four-note theme, and the chord progression (i – I – iv) indicate that the coda draws more from the development section than from the exposition or recapitulation. The music quietly subsides into a tranquillo section in which the inversion of the violin theme (first stated in measures 21–22 from the exposition) is sequenced across the strings while the piano continues to develop its initial theme. The violin and cello eventually sustain the tonic C for a great amount of time while the piano and viola begin to lean toward the tonic major in a continuing I – iv progression. All instruments continue to die down as the piano plays one last descending chromatic scale, the violin and viola combine the piano's initial theme with the quarter note rhythm of the violin theme, and the cello sustains a low C. As the piano and strings reach their final notes, a C major chord stated pianissimo is held briefly, shining out of the mist. Two sudden forte C major chords complete this quartet.
