= Matvei Wielhorski =

Russian-Polish cellist (1794–1866)

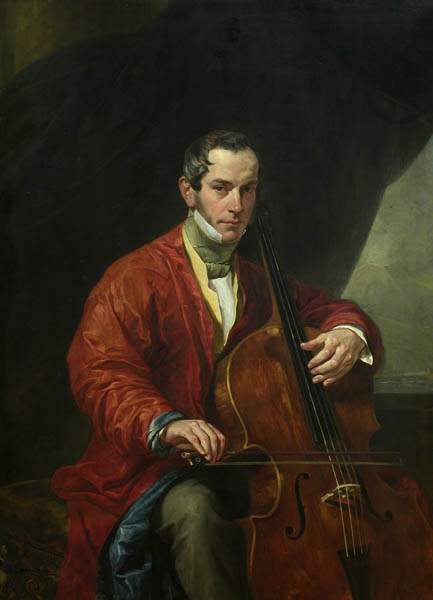
Matvei Wielhorski in 1828 by Karl Bryullov

Count Matvei Wielhorski (Russian: Матве́й Ю́рьевич Виельго́рский, Polish: Mateusz Wielhorski) (born Saint Petersburg, 15 April [O.S. 26 March] 1794 – died Nice, March 5, 1866) was a Russian cellist and count of Polish parentage. His ability to play cello was praised by Hector Berlioz. He studied music in Italy with Luigi Cherubini and returned to Russia where he became a patron of the arts. He supported Mikhail Glinka who would become Russia's first major composer and entertained Robert and Clara Schumann on their visit to Russia. Schumann dedicated his Piano Quartet to Wielhorski.

== Early life ==
The Wielhorski family home was located near the Mikhailovsky Palace, home of Grand Duke Michael Pavlovich of Russia, whose wife Elena Pavlovna hosted a political and musical salon. Matvei's brother Mikhail Wielhorski was a composer. There was no conservatory in Russia during those days, so Wielhorski and his brother studied in Paris under Cherubini. When they returned to Russia they were given positions at the Tsar's court and, as members of the aristocratic class, became patrons of the arts. European music like Mozart and Beethoven, composers that the Wielhorski's held in high regard, had come to Russia by way of the salons, such the one hosted by Grand Duchess Pavlovna, and The Philharmonic Society.

Pavlovna introduced Matvei to Anton Rubinstein.

== Composers ==
=== Glinka ===
The Wielhorski's provided rehearsal space for Glinka's opera A Life for the Tsar. Trained in Italy, Glinka became Russia's first major composer. A Life for the Tsar has been described as "patriotic and very monarchist", with a story by Vasily Zhukovsky and libretto by the Baron G. F. Rosen.

=== Robert Schumann ===
Schumann dedicated his Piano Quartet to Wielhorski, who had entertained the composer and his wife, Clara, on their visit to St. Petersburg in 1844. The evening included a lengthy performance of chamber music which included Schumann's own First Symphony. The Schumanns were reportedly impressed with Wielhorski's rendition of Mendelssohn's cello sonatas. Works by Beethoven, Spohr (played by violist Bernhard Molique) and Glinka were also performed.
