= Mark Gothoni =

Finnish violinist (born 1967)

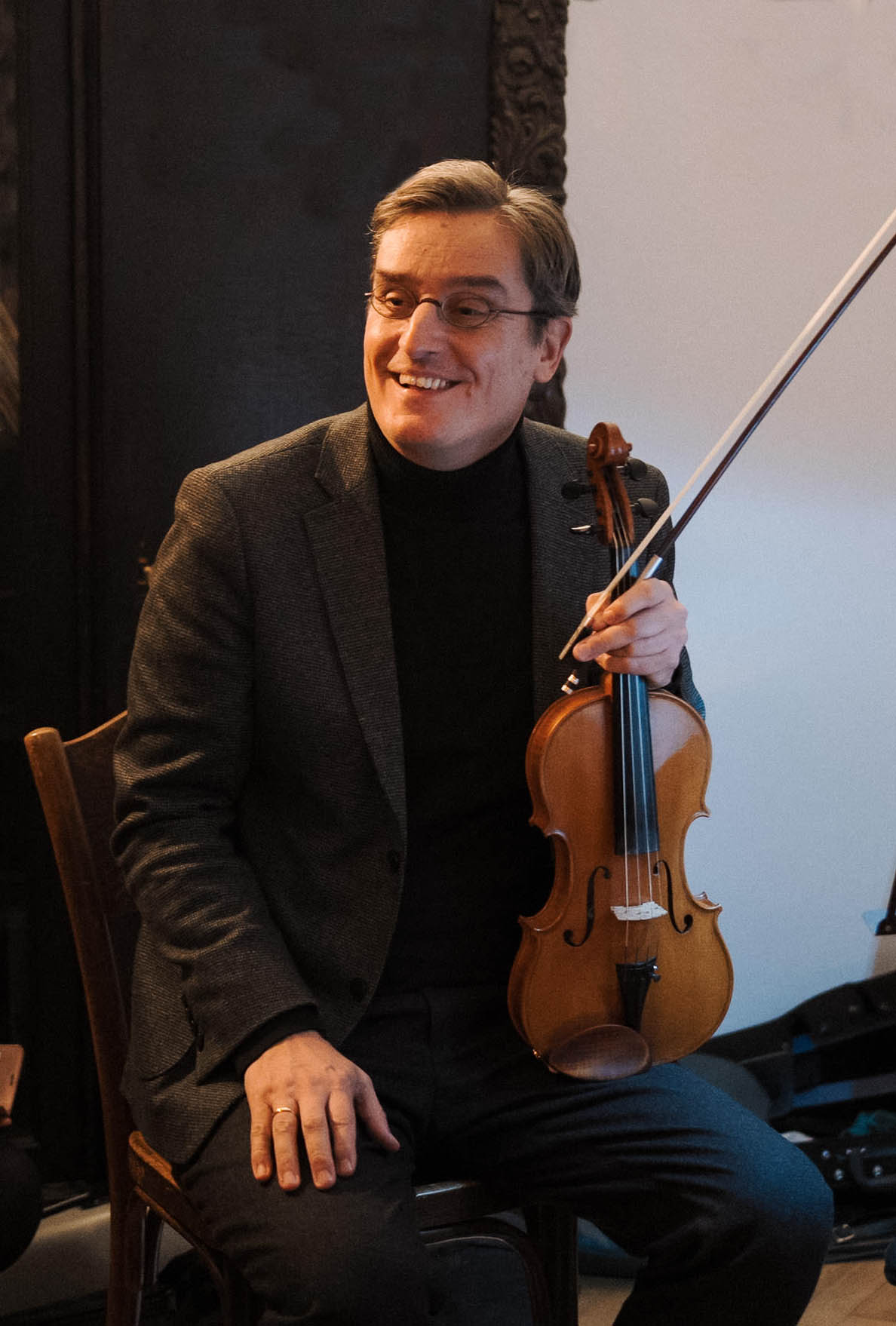
- Mark Gothoni in 2022

Background information
- Born: Mark Gothoni; 8 November 1967 (age 58); Lahti, Finland
- Genres: Classical
- Occupations: Violinist, pedagogue
- Instrument: Violin

Mark Gothoni is a German based Finnish violinist, who has made an international career as a chamber musician, soloist and professor at Berlin University of the Arts.

== Biography ==
Mark Gothoni was born in Lahti, Finland on 8 November 1967, and began his musical training at the age of six at the Sibelius Academy in Helsinki. Subsequently he became a pupil of Ana Chumachenco in Munich. He received further guidance from Shmuel Ashkenasi in Chicago and Sandor Végh in Salzburg.

Winner of several international competitions, he was honored in 1991 as “Debut-of-the-Year” at the Jyväskylä Arts Festival in Finland. Since then he has performed as a soloist and as chamber musician around the globe, including major festivals in Europe, Israel, the United States, and the Far East and concert halls like the Berlin Philharmonie, Concertgebouw Amsterdam, Lincoln Center New York, Library of Congress Washington, Wigmore Hall London and Kioi Hall Tokyo. As professor of violin at University of the Arts Berlin he is giving master classes all over the world and he is head of the chamber music department of the Savonlinna Music Academy in Finland. He served as concertmaster of the Zurich and Munich Chamber Orchestras amongst others and in 2004-08 he was the leader and musical director of the European Union Chamber Orchestra. He is the first violinist of the Orpheus Quartet and member of the award-winning Mozart Piano Quartet, with which he records exclusively for the German label MDG - Dabringhaus & Grimm.

== Family ==
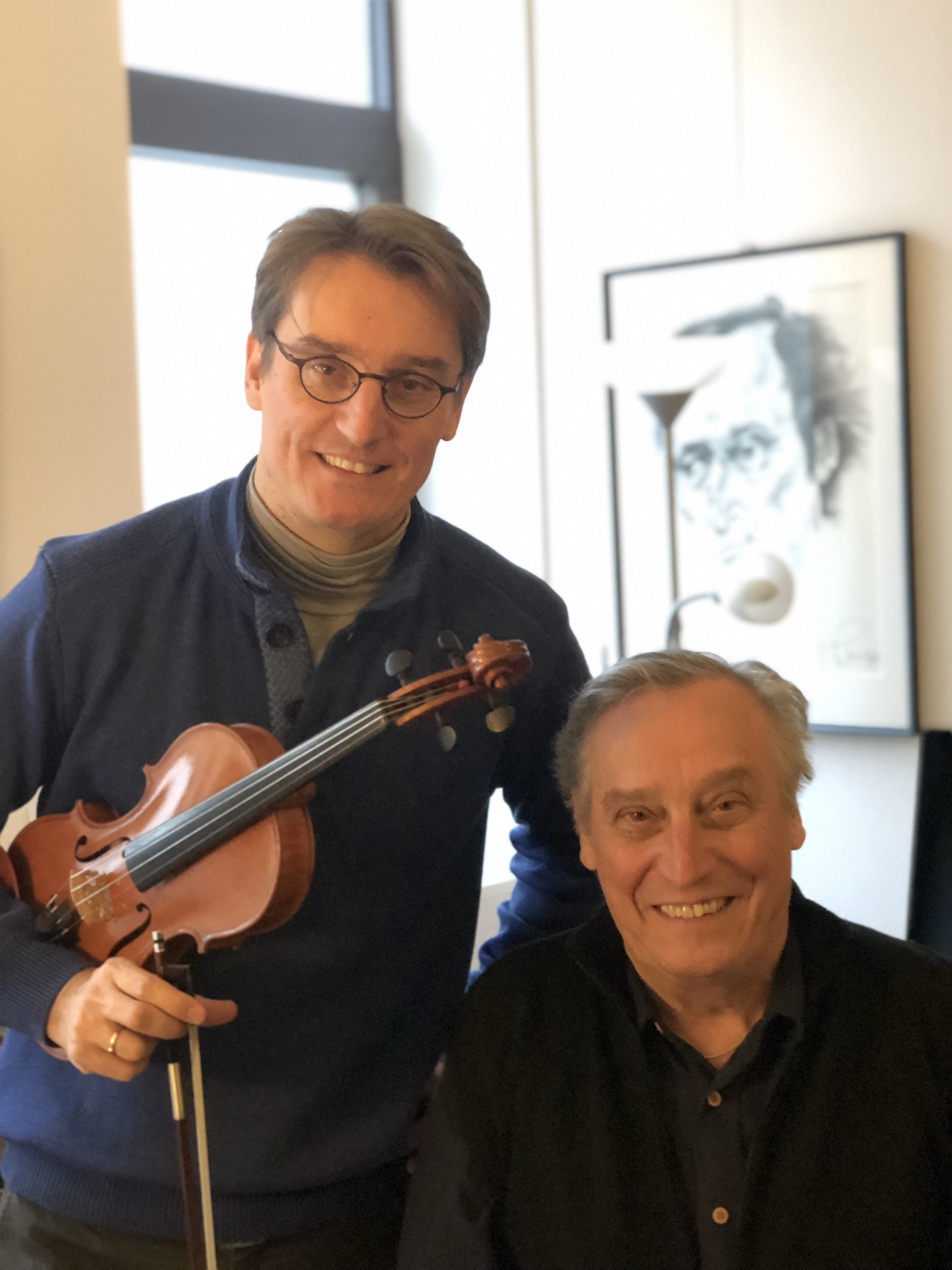
Mark and Ralf Gothoni in 2019

His father is the renowned pianist Ralf Gothoni, half brother Maris Gothoni and his daughter Lin Gothoni is an actress and a singer. He is married to the Japanese cellist Yuko Miyagawa since 2006.
