= Piano Quartet No. 2 (Mendelssohn) =

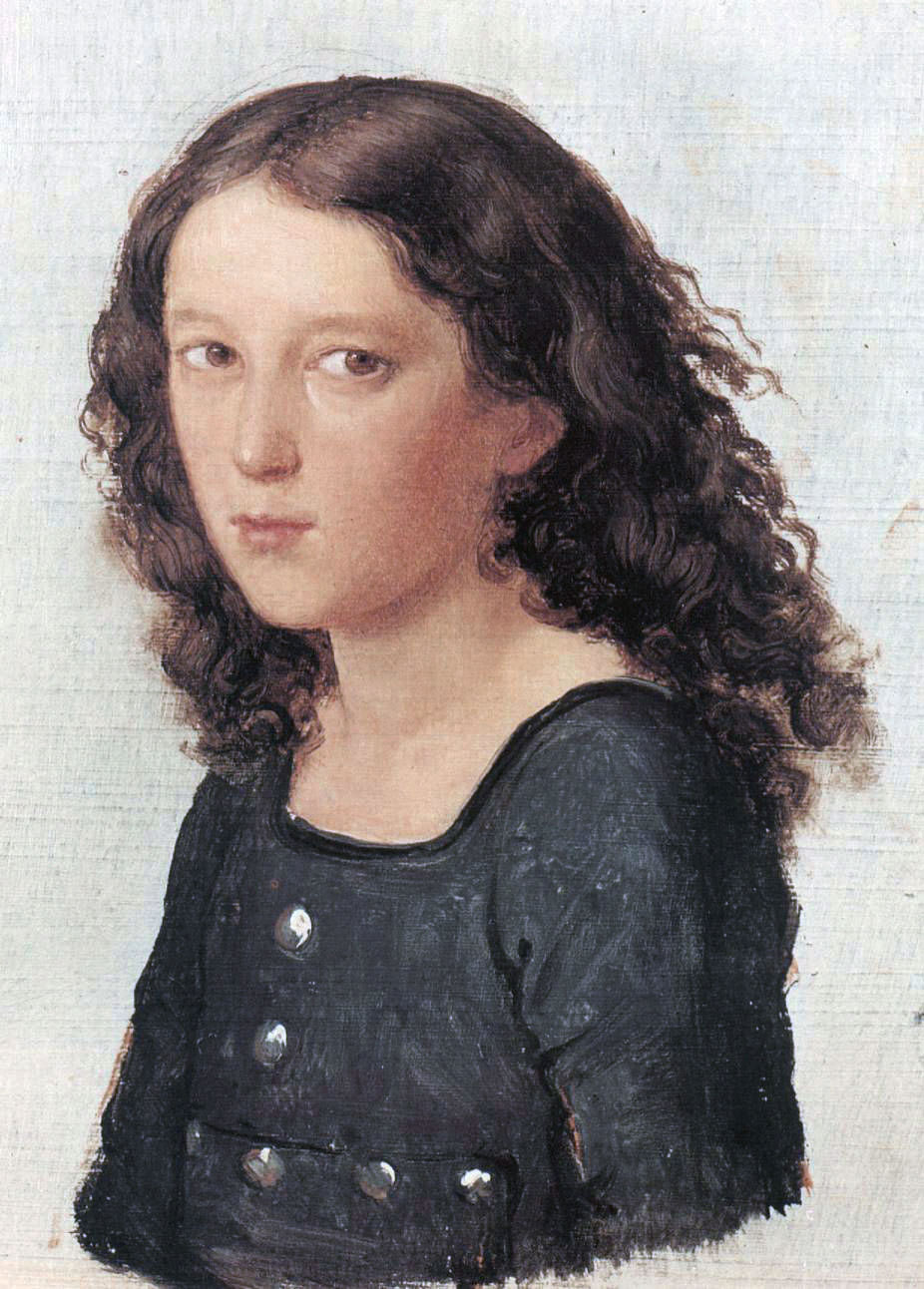
Felix Mendelssohn aged 12 (1821) by Carl Joseph Begas

Felix Mendelssohn's Piano Quartet No. 2 in F minor, Op. 2, for piano, violin, viola and cello was published in 1823, a year after his first Piano Quartet No. 1 in C minor, Op. 1. This work is dedicated to Carl Friedrich Zelter, who became Mendelssohn's composition and music tutor starting at the age of eight years old. Zelter would take Mendelssohn on trips to go see Johann Wolfgang von Goethe, who was also an important figure in Mendelssohn's life when it came to the composition of his earliest pieces between the years 1821-1825.

Mendelssohn's three piano quartets were the first piano quartets he composed and published. He composed the second quartet at the age of only 14 years.

== Historical Context ==
When Mendelssohn was eight years old, his parents got him a music tutor, Carl Friedrich Zelter. Zelter was Mendelssohn's composition and music theory tutor and he was always described as "rough-tongued, " coarse," and conservative but always kept his mindset neutral when he would teach Felix. He was so impressed by Felix that he would write letters to Goethe about him and he would end up taking Felix on a trip to Weimar, the first time in 1820, to meet Goethe. In one of Zelter's letters to Goethe, he mentioned how it was extremely rare for a Jewish person to go into music professionally. But, this did not change his views on Mendelssohn as a student, if anything, it encouraged him to get Mendelssohn out in the world because of how impressive it would be.

When Felix went to Weimar, he played the piano for Goethe for two hours, performing works by composers such as Bach, improvisations, and some of Felix's own compositions. Once Goethe saw for himself what Zelter was talking about, he kept Felix there for 16 days to work with him and Felix would end up taking more trips to see Goethe, with Zelter, throughout his teen-hood. Overall, the relationship between Mendelssohn and Zelter was very strong because of the type of influence that Zelter had on him and Mendelssohn would later create his own beginning works. Thus Mendelssohn dedicated the Piano Quartet No. 2 in F minor to Zelter.

== Analysis ==
A typical performance lasts just under half an hour. The work has four movements:

1. Allegro molto (F minor)
2. Adagio (D♭ major)
3. Intermezzo: Allegro moderato (F minor)
4. Finale: Allegro molto vivace (F minor)

=== I. Allegro molto ===
The second theme has similar musical elements from the first theme and development. Mendelssohn does this by using chromatic third relations to build up a series of modulations in ascending half or whole steps by going through a pattern of V and I. While the development goes through a harmonic exploration, the recapitulation has a thematic recurrence, which was a popular thing to do within the 19th century. Lastly, the coda is in two parts (the second half is marked Più allergro).

=== II. Adagio ===
Mendelssohn continues to explore the music, harmonically and in the development section. It begins in A♭ major. Then in a ascending motion, he modulates through a series of foreign keys.

=== III. Intermezzo ===
The movement is in 6/8 meter and the rhythm of the movement lacks variety and is very repetitive.

=== IV. Finale ===
In similarity to the first and second movements, this movement has a lot of ascending modulations throughout the piece. For the most part, the piano part dominates majority of the piece.

== Reception ==
There are two early reviews of his Piano Quartet No. 2 in F minor, Op. 2. The first one was written in November, 1825 by a critic using the pseudonym "BAMZ" and states that Mendelssohn was very talented, but he is too focused on form and not focused enough on the "material." This could mean he was too focused on the structure of the piece than the musicality of the piece itself. The second review was written sometime in 1828 by a critic using the pseudonym "LAMZ." It states that the piano quartet is the most successful example of this genre and it is "subdued, but always alive."
