= Hartmut Rohde =

German violist

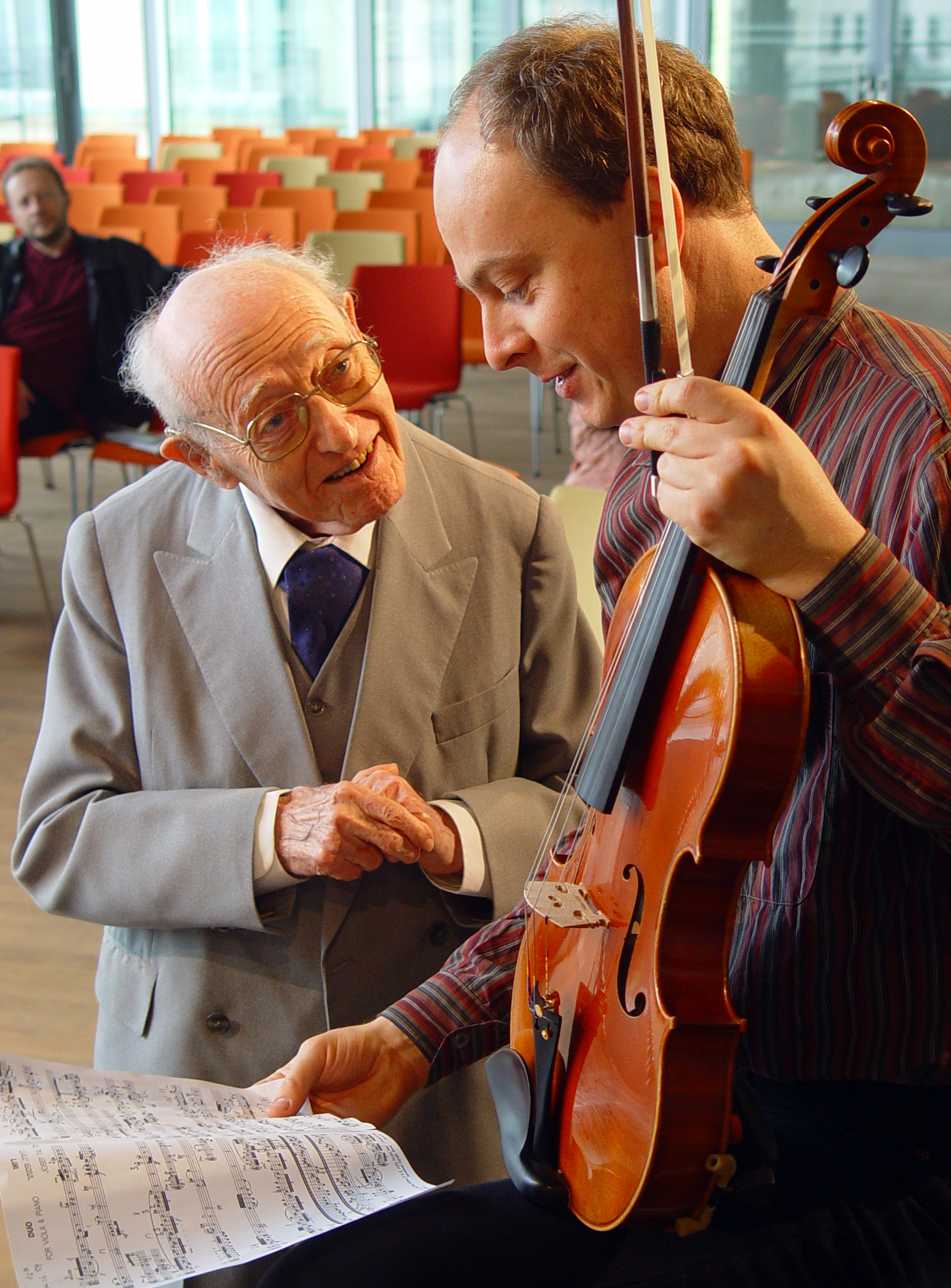
- Rohde (right) with Israeli composer Josef Tal. Berlin 2005
- Born: April 28, 1966 (age 59); Hildesheim, Lower Saxony, Germany
- Occupation: Violist

Hartmut Rohde (born 28 April 1966 in Hildesheim) is a German violist. He teaches at the Berlin University of the Arts.
