= Piano Quartet No. 2 (Brahms) =

Piano Quartet in A major
- No. 2
- Chamber music by Johannes Brahms
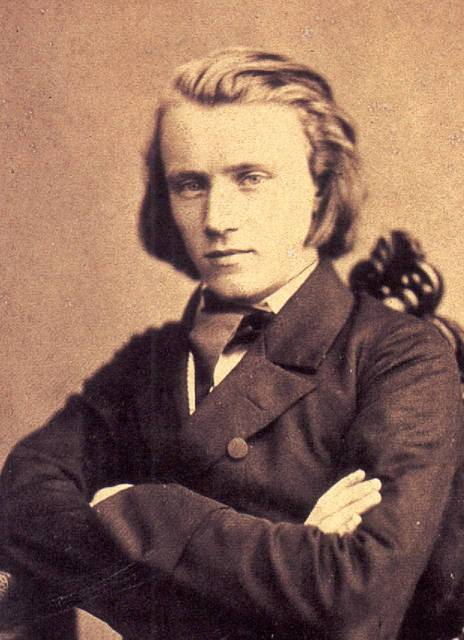
- The composer in 1853
- Opus: 26
- Composed: 1861
- Performed: 1863
- Duration: 50 minutes
- Movements: four
- Scoring: violin; viola; cello; piano.

The Piano Quartet No. 2 in A major, Op. 26, by Johannes Brahms is scored for piano, violin, viola and cello. It was completed in 1861 and received its premiere in November 1862 by the Hellmesberger Quartet with the composer playing the piano part. It has been especially noted for drawing influence from composer Franz Schubert. Lasting approximately 50 minutes, this quartet is the longest of Brahms's chamber works to perform and one of the longest piano quartets in the repertoire. He also made an arrangement of this quartet for two pianos.

== Music ==
The quartet is in four movements:

1. Allegro non troppo (A major)
2. Poco adagio (E major)
3. Scherzo: Poco allegro (A major, trio in D minor)
4. Finale: Allegro (A major)

The first movement is in sonata form. The second movement is in rondo form. The third movement is a scherzo and trio in compound ternary form, where both the scherzo and the trio are in sonata form. The fourth movement is in sonata-rondo form.
