= Piano Quartet No. 1 (Mendelssohn) =

Mendelssohn's 1st piano quartet

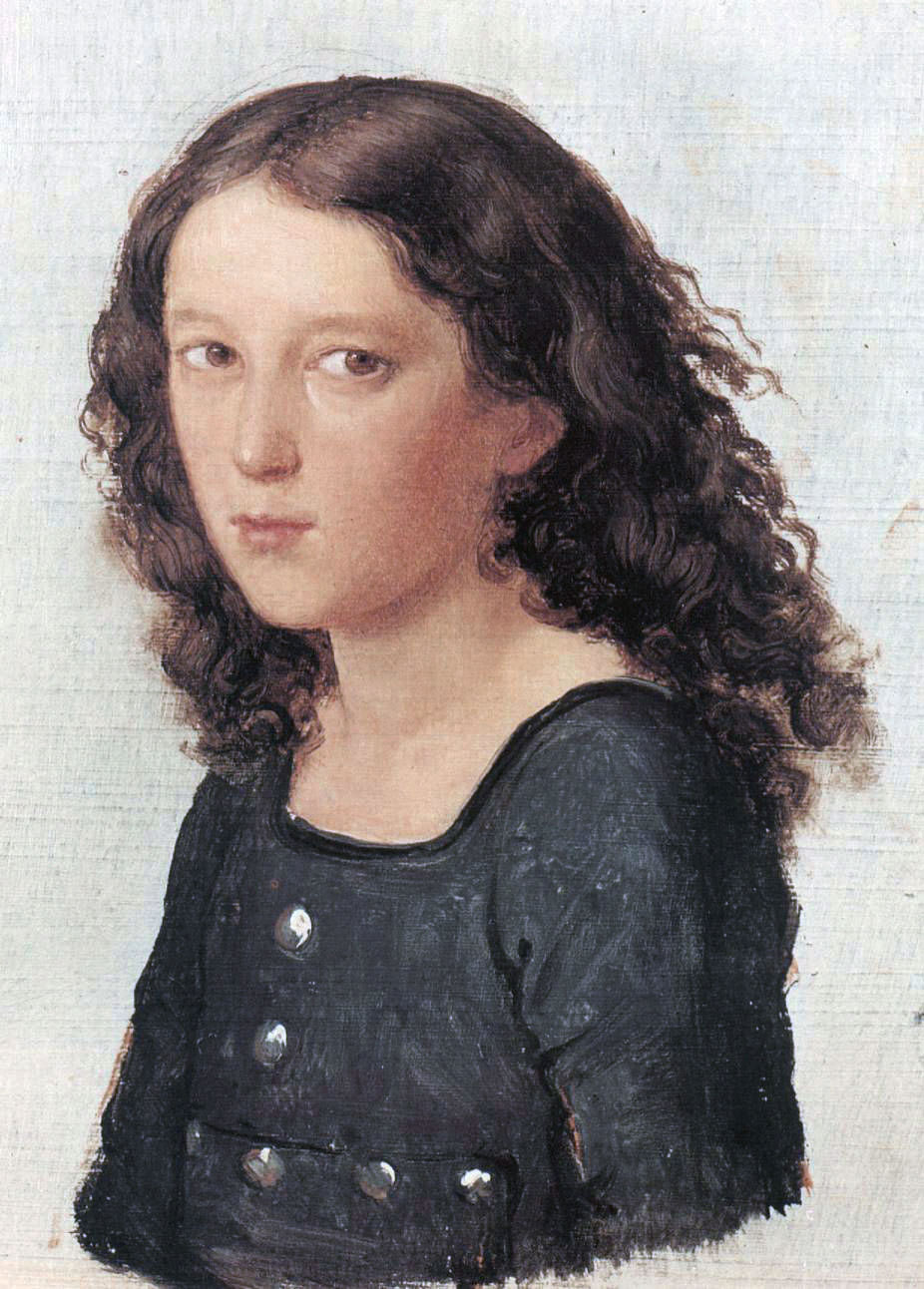
Felix Mendelssohn aged 12 (1821) by Carl Joseph Begas

Felix Mendelssohn's Piano Quartet No. 1 in C minor, Op. 1 (MWV Q 11), for piano, violin, viola and cello was completed on 18 October 1822 and dedicated to Polish Prince Antoni Radziwiłł. Mendelssohn's three numbered piano quartets were the first works of his to be published, hence their opus numbers. The piece was published in 1823, when Mendelssohn was fourteen years old.

== Structure ==
The work has four movements:

1. Allegro vivace (C minor)
2. Adagio (A♭ major)
3. Scherzo: Presto (C minor)
4. Allegro moderato (C minor)

A typical performance lasts just under half an hour.
