= Rehearsal letter =

Mark in an orchestral score

An example of rehearsal letters

A rehearsal letter, sometimes referred to as rehearsal marks, rehearsal figures, or rehearsal numbers, is a boldface letter of the alphabet in an orchestral score, and its corresponding parts, that provides the conductor, who typically leads rehearsals, with a convenient spot to tell the orchestra to begin at places other than the start of movements or pieces. Rehearsal letters are most often used in scores of the Romantic era and onwards, beginning with Louis Spohr. Rehearsal letters are typically placed at structural points in the piece.

== Purpose ==
In the course of rehearsing an orchestral piece, it is often necessary for the conductor to stop and go back to some point in the middle, in order to master the more difficult passages or sections, or to resolve a challenge that the ensemble is having. Many scores and parts have bar numbers, every five or ten bars, or at the beginning of each page or line. But as pieces and individual movements of works became longer (extending to several hundred bars) as the Romantic era progressed, bar numbers became less practical in rehearsal.

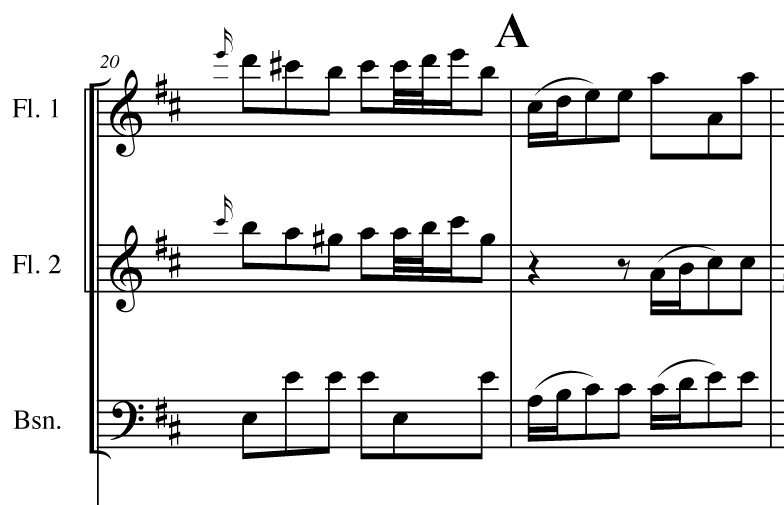
From a page in the full score of Christoph Graupner's Symphony in D major, Nagel 75. If the conductor wants to resume rehearsal from the second measure shown here, they could either say "measure 21" or "letter A".

For example, a conductor can tell their musicians to resume at bar 387, so that the musicians have to find the nearest bar number in their parts (e.g. 385 or 390) and count back or forward a couple of measures. Even if the number 387 is written at the appropriate bar, it might not particularly stand out. But if there is, for example, a big, bold letter M in the score and parts, it is much easier for the conductor to just say "begin at letter M". Even if the conductor were to say "one bar before letter M", that would still be more convenient than saying "bar 386". Alternatively the conductor could first say "before M..." and allow the players time to find M and then say "one bar".

In the score of a full orchestra, rehearsal letters are typically placed over the flutes' (or piccolo's) staff, and duplicated above the first violins' staff. For concert bands, rehearsal letters are placed over the piccolo's staff (or flutes'), and over the trumpets'. Rehearsal letters should appear in every part, but the conductor or librarian should check this and also make sure that they agree with the conductor's score; if they do not, the letters from the parts should be copied to the conductor's score. For typical pieces or movements of the Romantic era marked allegro, the letters A to Z can be used up, though the letters I, J or O (or all) may be skipped.

Placement and frequency of the letters do not follow a hard-and-fast rule. Generally they are inserted at places where there is a musically significant change, for example a new theme, or a change in dynamic or instrumentation or the start of a new section – just those places where a conductor might want to restart in rehearsal. In addition, having the letters coincide with musical signposts can help players who are counting rests confirm they are still in the right place, which would not be possible if the marks were placed at numerically regular intervals.

The letter A is almost always used for a point close to the beginning, but not for the very beginning itself because it is much easier to say "from the beginning". Likewise, rehearsal letters are not necessary at changes in tempo, key signature or time signature, as the name of the new tempo or signature can serve the same purpose. For example, in some editions of Beethoven's Ninth Symphony, letter A of the Finale does not occur until bar 140, when the relatively late entry of the first violins with the "Ode to Joy" theme might not stand out enough to the other players to be a convenient point of reference, whereas the reminiscences of the previous movements' themes are more easily referenced by their tempo markings.

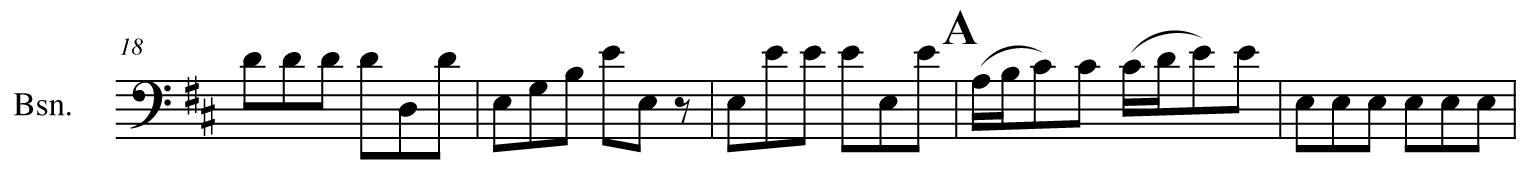
From the bassoon part of Christoph Graupner's Symphony in D major, Nagel 75. If the conductor says to resume playing from measure 21, the bassoonist has to count from measure 18, or count backwards from measure 23. But if the conductor says to resume from letter A, the bassoonist needs only find the letter A in his or her part.

A rehearsal letter usually breaks a multimeasure rest in a part (except in cases where a given instrument does not play at all in a given movement of the work). Because rehearsal letters are sometimes independent of edition and in some cases even version, they are also useful for telling applicants for positions in the orchestra what passages they need to play at the audition. They are also useful for easy reference in scholarly essays about orchestral works. However, rehearsal letters are altogether absent from some editions of some pieces that have them in other editions, such as the older editions of Richard Wagner's Meistersinger prelude.

Rehearsal letters are less useful in unaccompanied instrumental music such as the solo piano repertoire (although they may be used in duets), since the instrumentalist has no need to communicate to a fellow player where to resume playing. Songs also tend not to use them, because it is more useful to refer to the lyrics (except in pieces where the lyrics are highly repetitive, or those with long lyric-less sections).

The first edition of Antonio Vivaldi's Four Seasons has rehearsal letters A to G for each concerto, but the purpose was to relate the music to stanzas in the four sonnets that were published along with the music. Nothing prevents musicians from using those letters as rehearsal letters, other than them being relatively far apart.

== Longer scores ==
=== Multiple letters ===
In some cases, A to Z might not be enough. After Z, Aa may be used, followed by Bb, and so on until Zz (though Ii, Jj and/or Oo might also be skipped). The Wilhelm Hansen edition of Jean Sibelius's Symphony No. 7 in C major presents one unusual case: the letters A to Z (including both I and J, as well as O) are used up with just three more pages left in the score. For the final flute and bassoon solo, the editors use Ö (the final letter of the Finnish alphabet) as a rehearsal letter.

Boxed rehearsal numbers

=== Rehearsal numbers ===
In the case of some composers, such as Gustav Mahler and Dmitri Shostakovich, twice through the alphabet might still not be enough. For this reason, some editors prefer rehearsal numbers to rehearsal letters. Mahler's and Shostakovich's scores use rehearsal numbers rather than letters. These are typically in boldface and enclosed in a box, or less commonly, a circle. Confusingly, however, some editions enclose bar numbers in boxes, though usually not in bold. In the Schirmer edition of Roy Harris's Symphony No. 3 (in one movement), the rehearsal numbers are enclosed in circles, and they occur every ten measures, actually being the bar number divided by 10. That rehearsal numbers "are easily confused with measure numbers" is a reason sometimes given in favor of rehearsal letters.

Advocates of rehearsal numbers counter that even 26 letters are not enough for some scores. Whereas rehearsal letters reset to A for each movement of a multi-movement work (even for connected movements), rehearsal numbers typically run over the course of the entire work, even if the movements are not connected. For example, the rehearsal number for the last few bars of the first movement of Edward Elgar's First Symphony is 55; the first rehearsal number of the second movement is 56. There are exceptions, however. The final outburst in the first movement of Mahler's Second Symphony is rehearsal number 27. Mahler actually wanted a pause of five minutes before the next movement, so the rehearsal numbers reset to 1, ending with 15. The third movement follows after a short break, but its first rehearsal number is 28.

== Jazz and pop ==
In jazz and pop music, the musicians frequently refer to the "A section" or the "B section" of a 32 bar song during rehearsals. In pop music, the music is commonly organized into standard sections, such as an intro, multiple verses and choruses (refrain), one or more bridges, a guitar solo (or other instrumental solos), and an outro. As such, a bandleader who wishes to start in the middle of a song will typically specify which part of this structure the band should start on (e.g., "last four bars of the bridge, going into the guitar solo" or "last verse and go to the outro"). For jazz and pop compositions with several choruses, many jazz composers and arrangers use a format in which each successive verse/chorus part of the form is assigned successive letters of the alphabet combined with a measure number: for example, letter A for the first 8-bar phrase of the verse after the introduction, A9 for the next 8-bar phrase, A17, A25, then B, B9, B17, B25 for the chorus, etc., with the special rehearsal marking TAG for the tag ending.
