= Piano Quartet No. 1 (Dvořák) =

Piano quartet by Antonín Dvořák

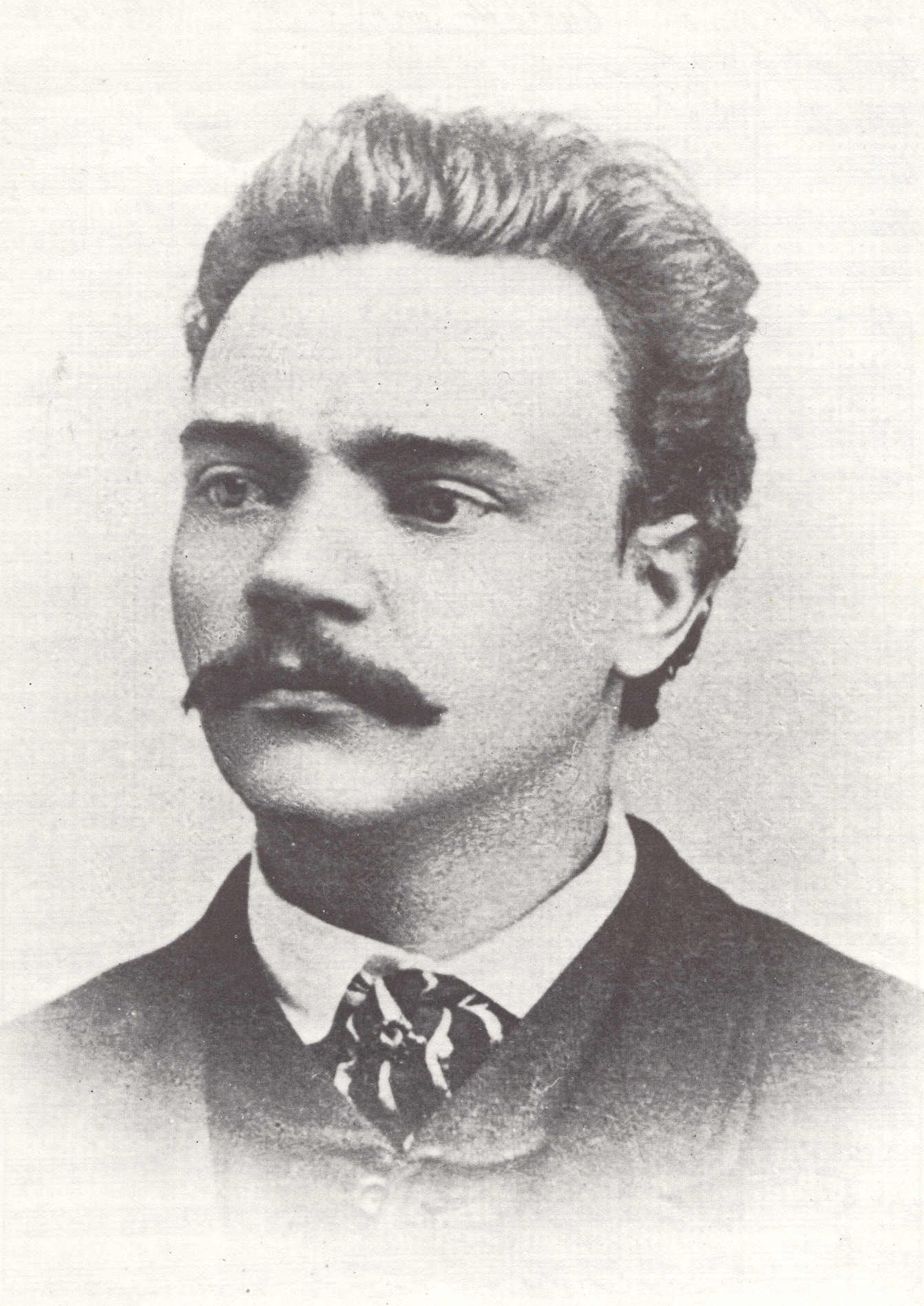
Antonín Dvořák aged 26 or 27 (1868)

The Piano Quartet No. 1 in D major, Op. 23 (B. 53), is a piano quartet by Antonín Dvořák. Composed during an 18-day period in 1875, it was premiered on 16 December 1880 in Prague, performed by Václav Kopta, Petr Mareš, Alois Neruda, and Karel Slavkovský.

== Structure ==
The composition consists of three movements:

1. Allegro moderato (D major)
2. Andantino con variazioni (B minor)
3. Finale. Allegretto scherzando (D major)

A typical performance takes approximately 35 minutes.
