= Piano Quartet No. 2 (Dvořák) =

Piano quartet by Antonín Dvořák

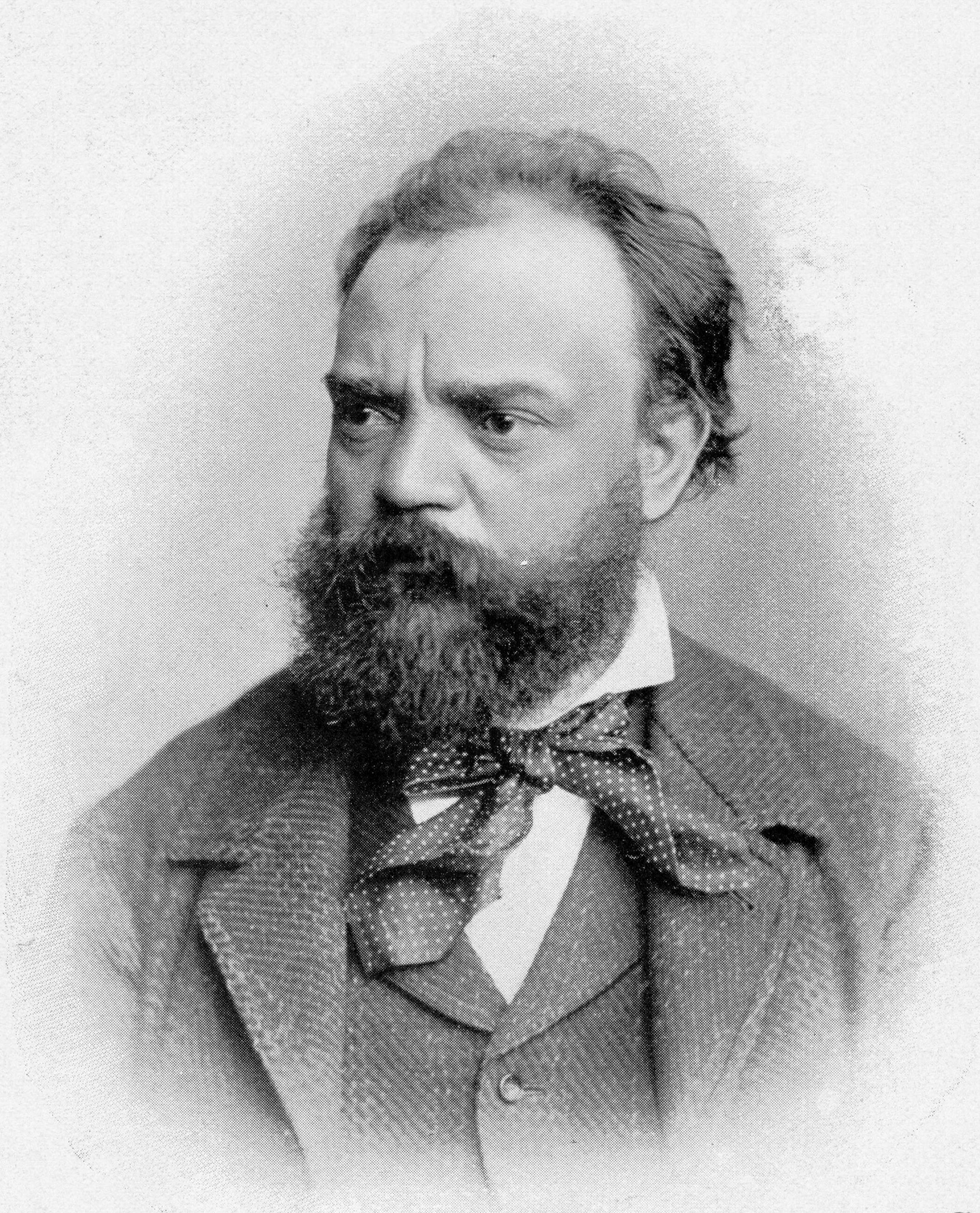
Antonín Dvořák in 1882

The Piano Quartet No. 2 in E♭ major, Op. 87 (B. 162), is a piano quartet by Antonín Dvořák. It was composed in summer 1889 at his country residence in Vysoká, and given its premiere performance on 17 October 1890 by Hugo Heermann, Ernst Welcker, Hugo Becker, and Martin Wallenstein.

== Structure ==
The composition consists of four movements:

1. Allegro con fuoco (E♭ major)
2. Lento (G♭ major)
3. Allegro moderato, grazioso (E♭ major) – Un pochettino più mosso (B major)
4. Finale. Allegro ma non troppo (E♭ minor, ends in E♭ major)

A typical performance takes approximately 35 minutes.
