= Piano Quartet in E major (Saint-Saëns) =

Piano Quartet by Camille Saint-Saëns

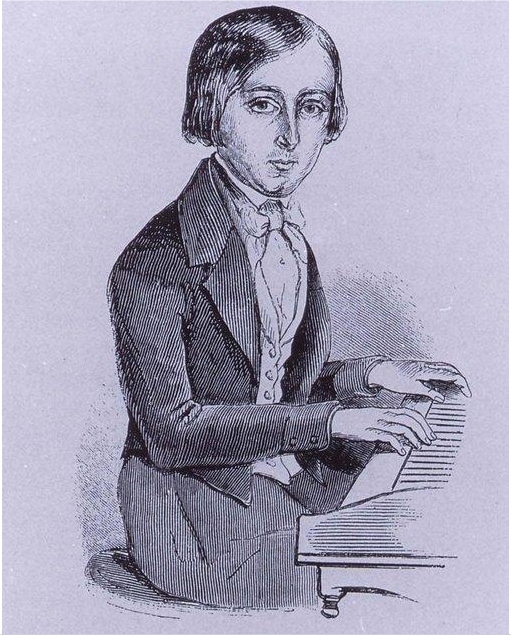
Saint-Saëns in 1846

The Piano Quartet in E major, Op. posth., by Camille Saint-Saëns, also known as the Piano Quartet No. 1 in E major, WoO, was one of the composer's earliest compositions for piano, violin, viola and cello. Completed in 1853, when he was 18 years of age, the piano quartet remained in manuscript until 1992.

== Background ==
Instead of publishing the work, Saint-Saëns donated the manuscript, with others, to the library of the Conservatoire de Paris. The Bibliothèque Nationale de France assumed the manuscript in 1964. The work was finally published in 1992, by the Éditions Musicales du Marais.

It is unknown why the composer left this work unpublished despite having performed it. Silvertrust speculated in his article that it was because in the 1850s chamber music was hard to publish in France due to the interest in operas and that by the 1870s the work, which shows signs that the composer was inspired by Beethoven, Schubert and Schumann, was too German sounding to publish in France following the Franco-Prussian War. It is also possible that Saint-Saëns was reluctant to present the work to a Parisian audience that was, at the time, sceptical of music by contemporary French composers.

== Structure ==
The quartet is structured in three movements:

1. Poco andante – Allegro vivace
2. Andante
3. Allegro con fuoco
