= Piano Quartet No. 2 (Enescu) =

- Chamber music by George Enescu
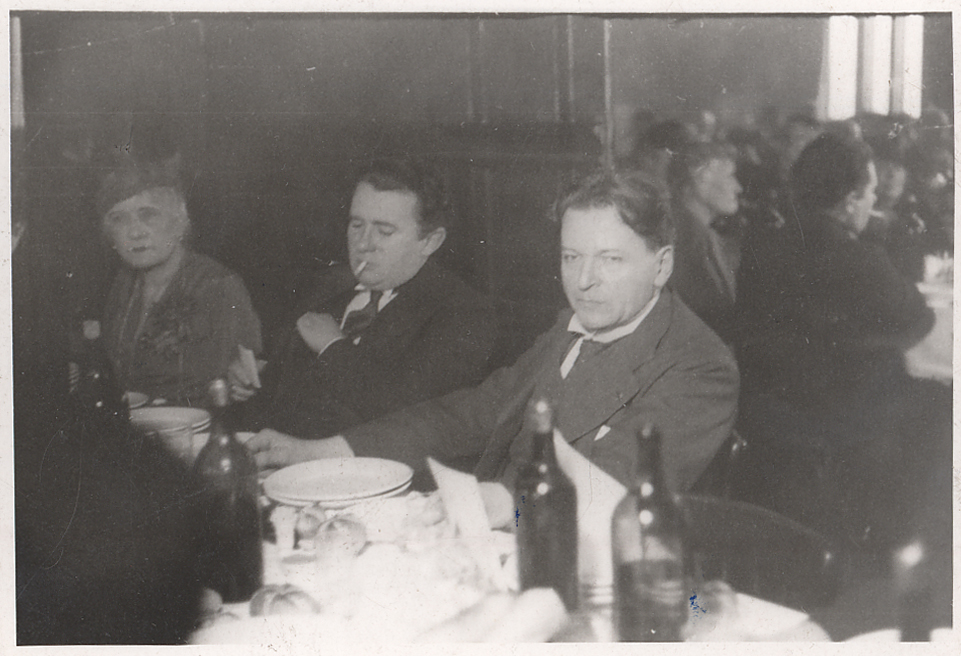
- Enescu in the 1940s
- Key: D minor
- Opus: 30
- Composed: 1943–44
- Dedication: Gabriel Fauré
- Performed: 31 October 1947 Library of Congress, Washington
- Movements: 3
- Scoring: piano; violin; viola; cello

Piano Quartet No. 2 in D minor, Op. 30, is a chamber-music composition by the Romanian composer George Enescu, written in 1943–44.

== History ==
Enescu began work on his Second Piano Quartet in July 1943. The first movement was finished on 27 July in Bucharest, the second movement on 27 August in Dorohoi, and the score was completed on 4 May 1944, at the composer's villa Luminiș, near Sinaia, all during the worst part of the war for Romania. Nevertheless, it contains some of his most tranquil music. The score is dedicated to the memory of his composition teacher, Gabriel Fauré.

The first performance of the work was given at the Library of Congress in Washington, DC, by the Albeneri Trio (Alexander Schneider, violin; Benar Heifetz, viola; Erich Itor Kahn, piano) with violist Milton Katims, on 31 October 1947, under the auspices of the Elizabeth Sprague Coolidge Foundation. A rival contender for the premiere was a French radio broadcast performance by Yvonne Astruc, violin, Maurice Vieux, viola, Charles Bartsch, cello, with the composer at the piano, on 29 October, but almost certainly in 1948 rather than 1947.

== Analysis ==
The quartet is in three movements:

1. Allegretto moderato
2. Andante pensieroso ed espressivo
3. Con moto moderato – Allegro agitato

The first movement, in D minor, is in sonata-allegro form; the second, slow movement, in E major, is in a three-part song form, with introduction and coda; the finale is an agitated, rapid movement in free sonata form in D minor but ends with a coda in D major. Characteristically for Enescu, the quartet is built cyclically: The opening idea of the first movement generates the thematic substance of the whole quartet. Fragments or cells of this idea are found throughout, often transformed and integrated into the composition of other main themes.

== Discography ==
- George Enescu: Cvartet nr. 2 pentru pian, vioară, violă și violoncel, in re minor, op. 30. Valentin Gheorghiu (piano), Ștefan Gheorghiu (violin), Valeriu Pitulac (viola), Aurel Niculescu (cello). LP recording, 1 disc: analogue, 33⅓ rpm, stereo., 12 in. Electrecord ST-ECE 01858. Romania: Electrecord, [1977?].
- George Enescu: Cvartet de coarde nr. 2 în sol major, op. 22, nr. 2; Cvartet nr. 2 pentru pian, vioară, violă, și violoncel în re minor, op. 30. Yvonne Piedemonte-Prelipcean (piano), members of the "Voces" String Quartet (Bujor Prelipcean, violin; Gheorghe Haag, viola; Dan Prelipcean, cello). Recorded in 1981. LP recording, 1 disc: analogue, 33⅓ rpm, stereo, 12 in. Electrecord ST ECE 01854. Romania: Electrecord, 1981.
  - Op. 30 from this recording reissued, coupled with Piano Quartet No. 1 played by the same forces (with Anton Diaconu, violin, in place of Bujor Prelipcean), CD recording, 1 disc: digital, 4¾ in., stereo. Olympia OCD 412. Olympia Explorer Series. London: Olympia, 1991.
- Enescu: Piano Quintet, Op. 29; Piano Quartet No. 2, Op. 30. The Solomon Ensemble (Dominic Saunders, piano; Anne Solomon, violin; Ralf Ehlers, viola; Rebecca Gilliver, cello; and in Op. 29, Andrew Roberts, violin). Recorded Potton Hall, Suffolk, England, Sept. 22–24, 2001. CD recording, 1 disc: digital, 4¾ in., stereo. Naxos 8.557159. [S.l.]: HNH International, 2003.
- George Enescu: Impressions from Childhood, Op. 28 (arr. for violin and orchestra by Theodor Grigoriu); Chamber Symphony, Op. 33; Piano Quartet No. 2, Op. 30, in D minor. Sherban Lupu (violin), Sinfonia da Camera, Ian Hobson, cond. (Opp. 28 and 33); Ian Hobson (piano), Sherban Lupu (violin), Csaba Erdélyi (viola), Mirel Iancovici (cello) (Op. 30). CD recording, 1 disc: digital, 4¾ in., stereo. TROY 1100. Albany: Albany Records, 2009.
- George Enescu: The Piano Quartets. Tammuz Piano Quartet (Oliver Triendl, piano; Daniel Goede, violin; Lars Anders Tomter, viola; Gustav Rivinius, cello). Recorded BR München, Studio 2, 27–28 March 2009 (Quartet No. 1), 24–25 November 20078 (Quartet No. 2). CD recording, 1 disc: digital, 4¾ in., stereo. CPO 777 506-2. Georgsmarienhütte: CPO, 2010.
- Enescu: Piano Quartets Nos. 1 and 2. Schubert Ensemble (William Howard, piano; Simon Blendis, violin; Douglas Paterson, viola; Jane Salmon, cello). Recorded Potton Hall, Dunwich, Suffolk, England, 6–7 December 2010 (Quartet No. 1), 12–13 February 2011 (Quartet No. 2). CD recording, 1 disc: digital, 4¾ in., stereo CHAN 10672. Colchester, Essex, England: Chandos, 2011.
