= Piano Quartets (Beethoven) =

Set of piano quartets by Ludwig van Beethoven

- Chamber music by Ludwig van Beethoven
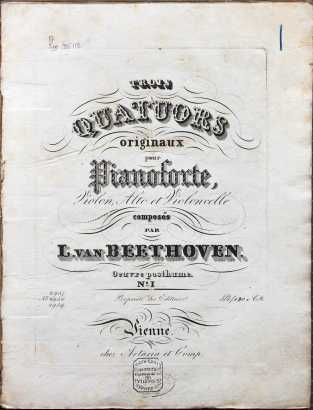
- Beethoven Piano Quartets- WoO36 - title-page (1st publication 1828)
- Catalogue: WoO 36
- Composed: 1785, Bonn
- Published: 1828, Vienna
- Publisher: Artaria
- Movements: Each quartet has 3 movements
- Scoring: piano; violin; viola; cello

The Piano Quartets, WoO 36, by Ludwig van Beethoven are a set of three piano quartets, completed in 1785 when the composer was aged 14. They are scored for piano, violin, viola and cello. He composed a quartet in C major, another in E♭ major, and a third in D major. They were first published posthumously in 1828, however numbered in a different order: Piano Quartet No. 1 in E♭ major, Piano Quartet No. 2 in D major, and Piano Quartet No. 3 in C major.

== History ==
When Beethoven composed these three pieces, the Piano Quartet was a rarely used ensemble. Two works by Mozart, Piano Quartet No. 1 in G minor (1785) and Piano Quartet No. 2 in E♭ major (1786), are the only significant contemporary contributions that are comparable. Beethoven modeled his piano quartets after a set of Mozart violin sonatas published in 1781, with Beethoven's C major work written in the same key and borrowing some thematic material from Mozart's Violin Sonata No. 17, K. 296. Apart from Beethoven's own arrangement of his Quintet for Piano and Wind Instruments (Op. 16) for piano quartet, these three works are the only compositions he wrote for piano, violin, viola, and cello.

Beethoven later reused material from the C major quartet for two of his early Piano Sonatas: No. 1 and No. 3. In Beethoven's original manuscript, the work in C major comes first, followed by E♭ major and D major. When the quartets were published after his death by Artaria in Vienna, there were in a different order: E♭ major, D major, and C major.

== Structure and music ==
Each quartet is in three movements. They are listed in the order of the original manuscript:

=== Piano Quartet in C major, No. 3 ===
1. Allegro vivace
2. Adagio con espressione
3. Rondo: Allegro

In the exposition of the first movement, Beethoven wrote a piano sonata with string accompaniment, but in the development and recapitulation, they play a more individual role. The third movement is in rondo form. The theme is introduced by the piano and then taken by the violin. The first episode is accompanied by plucked strings. A second episode is in A minor.

Beethoven reused the theme of the second movement for the Adagio of his Piano Sonata in F minor, Op. 2/1. He also reused material from the first movement for his Piano Sonata in C major, Op. 2/3, dedicated to Joseph Haydn in 1796.

=== Piano Quartet in E♭ major, No. 1 ===
1. Adagio assai
2. Allegro con spirito
3. Theme and variations: Cantabile

In the second quartet, the piano and the strings are equal partners. It opens unusually with an Adagio assai movement. The second movement is in sonata form, in E♭ minor. Some elements seem to anticipate the last movement of the Piano Sonata No. 8, the Pathétique. The finale movement is in seven variations on a theme.

=== Piano Quartet in D major, No. 2 ===
1. Allegro moderato
2. Andante con moto
3. Rondo: Allegro

The quartet in D major begins, more conventionally than the others, with a movement in sonata form, with a rather short development section. The second movement, marked Andante con moto, is in F♯ minor, but has a middle section in A major. The final movement is a rondo, with a theme introduced by the piano and repeated by the violin. The episodes are contrasting, and recall similar movements by Mozart.

== Recordings ==
The piano quartets were recorded by the Mannheimer Trio with Günter Ludwig (released 1963), Scheuerer Quartet in 1995, the New Zealand Piano Quartet in 2005, Milander Quartet in 2013. and by the Van Swieten Society performing on period instruments.
