= Piano Quartet No. 2 (Mozart) =

- Chamber music by W. A. Mozart
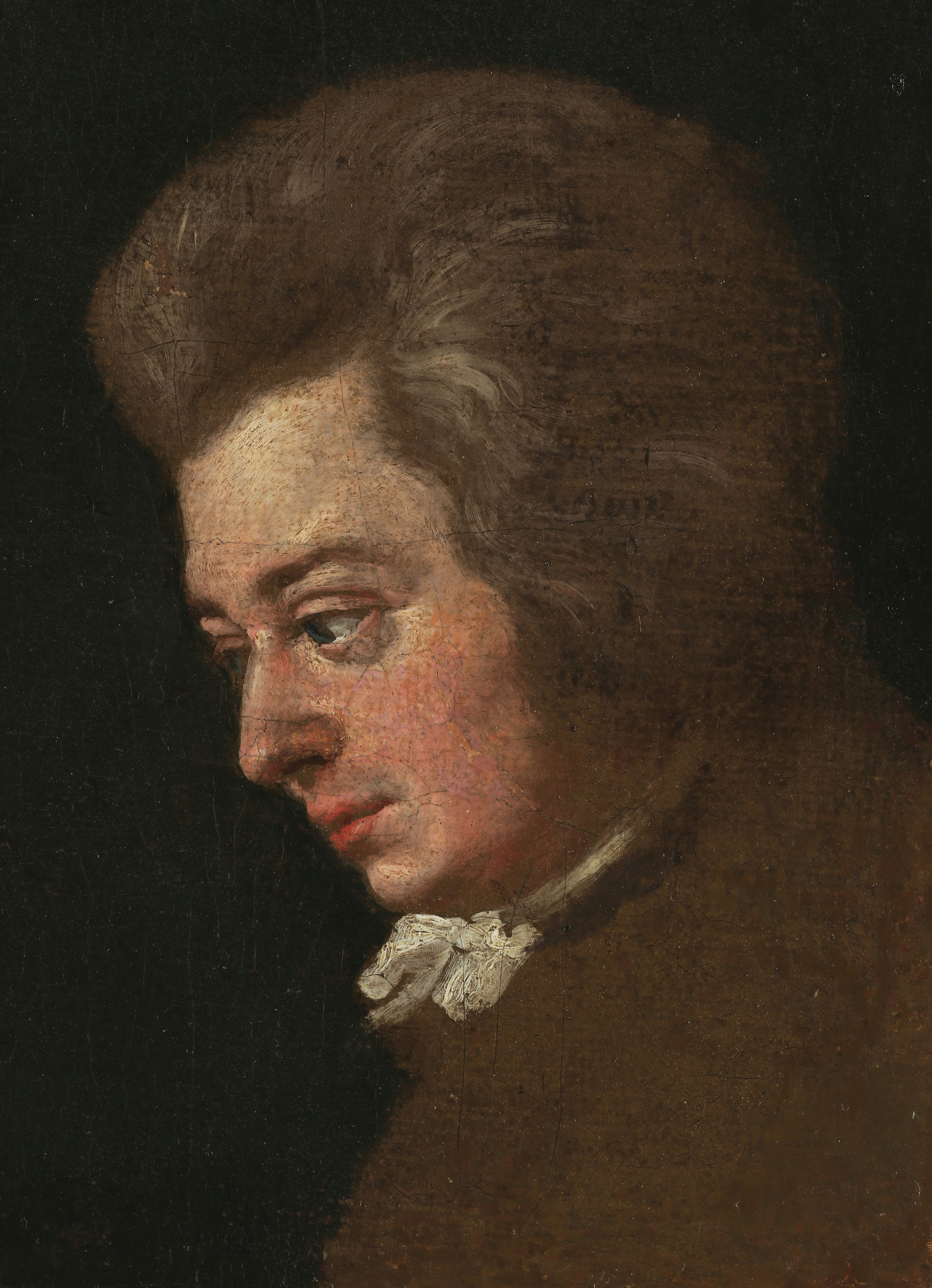
- The composer in 1782, unfinished portrait by Joseph Lange
- Key: E♭ major
- Catalogue: K. 493
- Composed: 1786
- Movements: three
- Scoring: violin; viola; cello; piano.

Mozart's Piano Quartet No. 2 in E♭ major, K. 493, was written after Franz Anton Hoffmeister released Mozart from the obligation of writing three piano quartets.

== Composition and reception ==
Mozart received a commission for three quartets in 1785 from the publisher Franz Anton Hoffmeister. Hoffmeister thought the G minor Quartet (K. 478) was too difficult and that the public would not buy it, so he released Mozart from the obligation of completing the set. Nine months later, Mozart composed this quartet anyway, completing it on 3 June 1786.

== Movements ==
The work is in three movements:

1. Allegro (common time)
2. Larghetto (3/8, A♭ major)
3. Allegretto (cut time)

== Editions and versions ==
The C. F. Peters Edition set of parts has rehearsal letters throughout the whole work; the Eulenburg Edition study score has measure numbers but no rehearsal letters, the same goes for Bärenreiter.

== Discography ==
Before CDs, almost all repeats were ignored to bring the whole piece at about 24 minutes in duration, thus allowing it to fit on one side of a phonograph record; the other side could then have the K. 478 at about 22 minutes (with repeats also ignored). Following all repeats brings the piece to about 29 to 30 minutes.

Alfred Brendel has recorded this work with members of the Alban Berg Quartett (without second violinist Gerhard Schulz); the Angel Records disc includes Brendel and the quartet playing the Piano Concerto in A major, K. 414.

However, it is far more common to pair this Quartet with the K. 478 Quartet; to give two examples: the Hyperion CD with Paul Lewis and the Leopold String Trio, and the Naxos recording by the Menuhin Festival Piano Quartet. The CBS Masterworks recording with Yo-Yo Ma, Jaime Laredo, Isaac Stern and Emanuel Ax, in addition to the two Quartets, also includes the Kegelstatt Trio, K. 498.

The quartet was recorded a number of times on period instruments with the Piano Quartet in G minor. Notable recordings of the two piano quartets include:

- Richard Burnett with Salomon Quartet (Amon Ra)
- Malcolm Bilson, Elizabeth Wilcock, Timothy Mason, Jan Schlapp (Archiv Produktion)
- Paul Badura-Skoda with Quatuor Festetics (Arcana)
- Andreas Staier with Les Adieux (Deutsche Harmonia Mundi)
- The Mozartean Players: Steven Lubin, Stanley Ritchie, David Miller and Myron Lutzke (Harmonia Mundi France)
- Bart van Oort, Tjamke Roelofs, Bernadette Verhagen and Jaap ter Linden (Columns Classics)
- La Petite Symphonie: Daniel Isoir, Stéphanie Paulet, Diane Chmela and Mathurin Matharel (Muso)
