= Piano Quartet No. 1 (Mozart) =

- Chamber music by W. A. Mozart
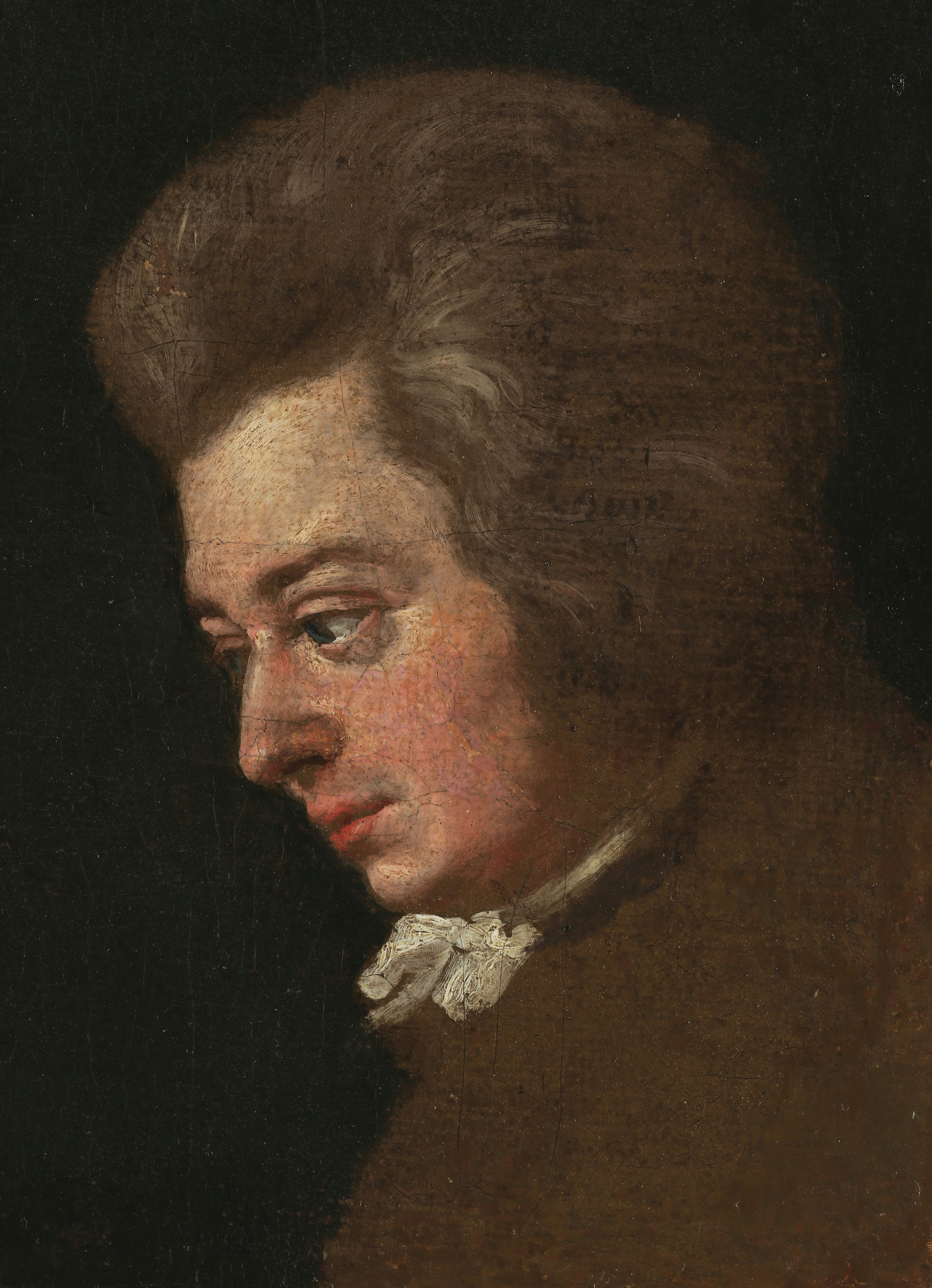
- The composer in 1782, unfinished portrait by Joseph Lange
- Key: G minor
- Catalogue: K. 478
- Composed: 1785
- Movements: three
- Scoring: violin; viola; cello; piano.

Mozart's Piano Quartet No. 1 in G minor, K. 478, is scored for violin, viola, cello, and pianoforte. It was composed in 1785.

== Composition and reception ==
Mozart received a commission for three quartets in 1785 from the publisher Franz Anton Hoffmeister. Hoffmeister thought this quartet was too difficult and that the public would not buy it, so he released Mozart from the obligation of completing the set. (Nine months later, Mozart composed a second quartet anyway, in E-flat major, K. 493).

Hoffmeister's fear that the work was too difficult for amateurs was borne out by an article in the Journal des Luxus und der Moden published in Weimar in June 1788. The article highly praised Mozart and his work, but expressed dismay over attempts by amateurs to perform it:

[as performed by amateurs] it could not please: everybody yawned with boredom over the incomprehensible tintamarre of 4 instruments which did not keep together for four bars on end, and whose senseless concentus never allowed any unity of feeling; but it had to please, it had to be praised! ... what a difference when this much-advertised work of art is performed with the highest degree of accuracy by four skilled musicians who have studied it carefully.

The assessment accords with a view widely held of Mozart in his own lifetime, that of a greatly talented composer who wrote very difficult music. This view has been challenged by Ridgewell. He points out, first, that there is almost no hard evidence of the public reception of the quartet at the time. The review above, in fact, complained about its widespread popularity among amateur musicians who performed it badly. And it is also not certain whether it referred to this piano quartet or the second, which had by then been published by Artaria. Maynard Solomon points out that Hoffmeister "contrary to legend, was so little discouraged by the reception of this his first Mozart publication that he issued eleven others of his works over the next three or four years", casting further doubt on the reasons for the cancellation of the commission.

At the time the piece was written, the harpsichord was still widely used. Although the piece was originally published with the title "Quatuor pour le Clavecin ou Forte Piano, Violon, Tallie [sic] et Basse", stylistic evidence suggests Mozart intended the piano part for "the 'Viennese' fortepiano of the period" and that, according to Basil Smallman, our modern piano is "a perfectly acceptable alternative".

== Movements ==
III. Rondo (Allegro moderato)

The work is in three movements:

1. Allegro (G minor,)
2. Andante (B♭ major, 3/8)
3. Rondo (Allegro moderato) (G major,)

== Editions and versions ==
The C. F. Peters Edition set of parts has rehearsal letters throughout the whole work; the Eulenburg Edition study score has measure numbers but no rehearsal letters, the same goes for Bärenreiter.

The quartet is also available in an arrangement for string quintet.

== Notes ==
=== Sources ===
- Deutsch, Otto Erich (1965). Mozart: A Documentary Biography. Stanford: Stanford University Press. OCLC 8991008.
- Solomon, Maynard (1995). Mozart: A Life. New York: Harper Collins Publishers. ISBN 0-06-019046-9.
