= Piano Quartet No. 1 (Enescu) =

- Chamber music by George Enescu
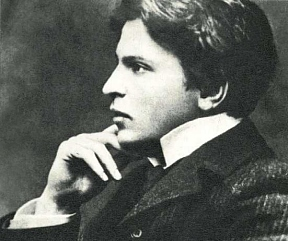
- Enescu in the 1910s
- Key: D major
- Opus: 16
- Composed: 1909
- Dedication: Mme Ephrussi
- Performed: 18 December 1909 Paris
- Published: 1965
- Movements: 3
- Scoring: piano; violin; viola; cello

The Piano Quartet No. 1 in D major, Op. 16, is a chamber music composition by the Romanian composer George Enescu, written in 1909 and first performed in Paris the same year.

== History ==
Enescu composed his First Piano Quartet in 1909: the first movement in Sinaia, the remaining two movements in Paris. The work was completed on 10 December, just over a week prior to the concert in which it was premiered, in the series Soirées d'Art on 18 December 1909—a programme that also included the premiere of the already ten-year-old Octet for Strings. The score is dedicated to Mme Ephrussi, the wife of the Parisian banker Michel Ephrussi.

There were only two further performances of the Quartet in the composer's lifetime: on 18 May 1910, and again in 1933, both times with the composer at the piano. It seems likely that Enescu had doubts about the work and might have wished to revise the score. This never happened, however, and the Quartet remained unpublished until 1965, a decade after the composer's death.

== Analysis ==
The quartet is in three movements:

1. Allegro moderato
2. Andante mesto
3. Vivace

The opening movement, a sonata-allegro in D major, starts with the principal theme presented in the unison—a device of which Enescu was fond. This theme resembles the first theme of Enescu's Wind Decet, composed three years earlier, but its development occasionally looks forward to the heterophony characteristic of Enescu's later style.

The central Andante movement is a song form in the key of A♭ minor, a tritone away from the home key of the outer movements—a relationship that Enescu will explore again in the Second Symphony. The main theme is particularly expressive, with modal coloring, and is presented at the outset of the movement in the cello. The second theme group is largely derived from the first theme, but displays a scalewise melodic cell alternating semitones and whole tones, which will emerge as a full descending octatonic scale five bars after rehearsal 39. In the coda, the piano unexpectedly introduces the secondary theme of the first movement, which is the only cyclic feature found in this work.

The finale is, like the opening movement, in sonata-allegro form, but opens unexpectedly in D minor rather than major. It possesses a relentless rhythmic pulsation which, together with a vigorous cheerfulness, serves well the traditional function of a finale, but also that of a scherzo, a movement this work lacks.
