= List of piano concertos by key =

This is a list of piano concertos by key. For the least often used keys in orchestral music, the piano concerto listed might be famous only for being in that key. Technically, the piano can play in any key, and the unaccompanied solo piano repertoire abounds in keys that are used less frequently in orchestral music. Even so, some preferences manifest themselves.

== Major ==
=== C major ===
- Piano Concerto (Leroy Anderson)
- Piano Concerto No. 1 (Beethoven)
- Piano Concerto (for Hans piano) (de Boeck)
- Piano Concerto No. 2 (Brüll)
- Piano Concerto (Busoni)
- Piano Concerto No. 5 (Field)
- Piano Concerto No. 6 (Field)
- Piano Concerto (Gál)
- Piano Concerto No. 1 (Hummel)
- Piano Concerto No. 2 (Kapustin)
- Piano Concerto No. 3 (Koczalski)
- Piano Concerto (Kuhlau)
- Piano Concerto (Lessel)
- Piano Concerto No. 5 (Moscheles)
- Piano Concerto No. 8 (Mozart)
- Piano Concerto No. 13 (Mozart)
- Piano Concerto No. 21 (Mozart)
- Piano Concerto No. 25 (Mozart)
- Piano Concerto No. 1 (F. X. Mozart)
- Piano Concerto (Pixis)
- Piano Concerto No. 3 (Prokofiev)
- Piano Concerto No. 3 (Reinecke)
- Piano Concerto No. 6, Op. 123 (Ries)
- Piano Concerto No. 7 (Röntgen)
- Piano Concerto (Vaughan Williams)
- Piano Concerto No. 1 (Weber)
- Piano Concerto (Erich Zeisl)

=== C♯ major/D♭ major ===
- Piano Concerto (Willem Andriessen)
- Piano Concerto No.1 (Curiel)
- Piano Concerto (Gablenz)
- Piano Concerto No. 2 (Golubev)
- Piano Concerto (Khachaturian)
- Piano Concerto for the Left Hand (in C♯ minor and C♯ major), Op.17 (Korngold)
- Piano Concerto No. 1 (Prokofiev)
- Piano Concerto (Sinding)

=== D major ===
- Piano Concerto (Alnæs)
- Piano Concerto (Berwald)
- Piano Concerto No. 2 (Böhner)
- Piano Concerto, Op.13 (Benjamin Britten)
- Piano Concerto (Grimm)
- Piano Concerto No. 11 (Haydn)
- Piano Concerto No. 3 (Hans Huber)
- Piano Concerto No. 3 (Kabalevsky)
- Piano Concerto No. 5 (Lemba)
- Piano Concerto No. 8 "Pastorale" (Moscheles)
- Piano Concerto No. 3 (Mozart)
- Piano Concerto No. 5 (Mozart)
- Piano Concerto No. 16 (Mozart)
- Piano Concerto No. 26 (Mozart)
- Piano Concerto [for the left hand] (Ravel)
- Piano Concerto No. 5 "Pastorale" (Ries)
- Piano Concerto No. 2 (Röntgen)
- Piano Concerto No. 1 (Saint-Saëns)
- Piano Concerto No. 1 (Shchedrin)
- Piano Concerto No. 5 (Vladigerov)

=== E♭ major ===
- Piano Concerto No. 2 (Balakirev)
- Piano Concerto No. 5 ("Emperor") (Beethoven)
- Piano Concerto No. 2 (Benedict)
- Piano Concerto No. 2 for the left hand (in C minor and E♭ major) (Bortkiewicz)
- Piano Concerto No. 1 (Bowen)
- Piano Concerto No. 3 (Cleve, with string orchestra accompaniment)
- Piano Concerto (Draeseke)
- Piano Concerto (Deutscher)
- Piano Concerto No. 2 (Eckhardt-Gramatté)
- Piano Concerto No. 1 (Field)
- Piano Concerto No. 3 (Field)
- Piano Concerto No. 4 (Field)
- Piano Concerto No. 1 (Goetz)
- Piano Concerto (for piano pédalier) (Gounod)
- Piano Concerto (Ireland)
- Piano Concerto No. 1 (Kapustin)
- Piano Concerto No. 5 (Kapustin)
- Piano Concerto Op. 25 (Slawomir Kowalinski)
- Piano Concerto No. 1 (Liszt)
- Concerto Symphonique No. 3 (Litolff)
- Piano Concerto No. 2 ("Castelli Romani") (Marx)
- Piano Concerto (Massenet)
- Piano Concerto No. 2 (Moscheles)
- Piano Concerto No. 9 (Mozart)
- Piano Concerto No. 10 [for two pianos] (Mozart)
- Piano Concerto No. 14 (Mozart)
- Piano Concerto No. 22 (Mozart)
- Piano Concerto No. 2 (F. X. Mozart)
- Piano Concerto No. 2, Op. 42 (Ries)
- Piano Concerto No. 5 (Rubinstein)
- Piano Concerto No. 3, Op. 30 (Roger Sacheverell Coke)
- Piano Concerto No. 3 (Saint-Saëns)
- Piano Concerto (for the left hand) (Franz Schmidt)
- Piano Concerto No. 3 (Stanford)
- Piano Concerto No. 2 (Sterndale Bennett)
- Piano Concerto No. 3 (Tchaikovsky)
- Piano Concerto (Urspruch)
- Piano Concerto No. 2 (Weber)

=== E major ===
- Piano Concerto No. 2 (d'Albert)
- Piano Concerto No. 3 (Bartók)
- Piano Concerto No. 4 (Herz)
- Piano Concerto No. 4 (Hummel)
- Piano Concerto No. 6 (Koczalski)
- Piano Concerto No. 2 (Lyapunov)
- "Romantisches" Piano Concerto (No. 1) (Marx)
- Piano Concerto [for two pianos] (Felix Mendelssohn)
- Piano Concerto No. 4 (Moscheles)
- Piano Concerto No. 2 (Montague Phillips)
- Piano Concerto No. 4 (Cipriani Potter)
- Piano Concerto No. 2, Op. 59 (Moritz Moszkowski)
- Piano Concerto No. 1 (Taubert)

=== F major ===
- Piano Concerto (Brandts-Buys)
- Concerto in F (Gershwin)
- Piano Concerto No. 6 [Op. posth. 1] (Hummel)
- Concerto piccolo (Piano Concerto No. 2) (Jordan)
- Piano Concerto No. 1 (Moscheles)
- Piano Concerto No. 1 (Mozart)
- Piano Concerto No. 7 [for three pianos] (Mozart)
- Piano Concerto No. 11 (Mozart)
- Piano Concerto No. 19 (Mozart)
- Piano Concerto No. 2 (Rubinstein)
- Piano Concerto No. 4 (Röntgen)
- Piano Concerto No. 5 (Saint-Saëns)
- Piano Concerto No. 2 (Shostakovich)

=== F♯ major/G♭ major ===
- Piano Concerto (Parry)
- Piano Concerto No. 2 (Volfgangs Dārziņš)
- Piano Concerto No. 1 (Krenek)

=== G major ===
- Piano Concerto (Auster)
- Piano Concerto No. 2 (Bartók)
- Piano Concerto No. 4 (Beethoven)
- Piano Concerto (Gubitosi)
- Piano Concerto (Hanson)
- Piano Concerto No. 6 (Kapustin)
- Piano Concerto No. 2 (Koczalski)
- Piano Concerto No. 1 (Lemba)
- Scottish Concerto (Mackenzie)
- Piano Concerto No. 4 (Mozart)
- Piano Concerto No. 17 (Mozart)
- Piano Concerto No. 5 (Prokofiev)
- Piano Concerto in G (Ravel)
- Piano Concerto No. 3 (Rubinstein)
- Piano Concerto No. 1 (Stanford)
- Piano Concerto No. 2 (Tchaikovsky)
- Concert Fantasia, Op. 56 (Tchaikovsky)

=== A♭ major ===
- Piano Concerto (Catoire)
- Piano Concerto (Dobrzyński)
- Piano Concerto No. 2 (Field)
- Piano Concerto No. 8 (Herz)
- Piano Concerto No. 3 (Hiller)
- Piano Concerto No. 5 (Hummel)
- Piano Concerto No. 4 (Kalkbrenner)
- Piano Concerto (No. 1) (Kunneke)
- Piano Concerto [for two pianos] (Felix Mendelssohn)
- Piano Concerto (No. 2) (Rheinberger)
- Piano Concerto No. 8, Op. 151 "Gruss an den Rhein" (Ries)
- Piano Concerto No. 2 (Stojowski)

=== A major ===
- Piano Concerto (Braunfels)
- Piano Concerto (Brun)
- Piano Concerto No. 1 (Cleve)
- Piano Concerto No. 1 (Herz)
- Piano Concerto No. 2 (Liszt)
- Piano Concerto No. 2 (Loewe)
- Piano Concerto No. 12 (Mozart)
- Piano Concerto No. 23 (Mozart)
- Piano Concerto No. 5 (Palmgren)
- Piano Concerto No. 2 (Taubert)
- Piano Concerto (Tovey)

=== B♭ major ===
- Piano Concerto No. 2 (Beethoven)
- Piano Concerto (Berkeley)
- Piano Concerto (Bliss)
- Piano Concerto No.1 (Bortkiewicz)
- Piano Concerto No. 2 (Brahms)
- Piano Concerto No. 2 (Goetz)
- Piano Concerto No. 4 (Koczalski)
- Piano Concerto No. 1 (Kreutzer)
- Piano Concerto No. 4 (Lemba)
- Piano Concerto No. 6 "Fantastique" (Moscheles)
- Piano Concerto No. 2 (Mozart)
- Piano Concerto No. 6 (Mozart)
- Piano Concerto No. 15 (Mozart)
- Piano Concerto No. 18 (Mozart)
- Piano Concerto No. 27 (Mozart)
- Piano Concerto No. 4 [for the left hand] (Prokofiev)
- Piano Concerto (Stanford, unnumbered, 1873)
- Piano Concerto No. 3 (Stoyanov)
- Piano Concerto No. 1 (Weismann)

=== B major ===
- Piano Concerto No. 2 (Glazunov)
- Piano Concerto (Huss)
- Piano Concerto No. 1 (Nikolayeva)
- Piano Concerto (Scholz)

== Minor ==
=== C minor ===
- Piano Concerto No. 3 (Beethoven)
- Piano Concerto No. 1 (Benedict)
- Piano Concerto "Symphonic Tale" (Benoit)
- Philip Marlowe Concerto (Piano Concerto No. 2) (Boissier)
- Piano Concerto No. 2 for the left hand (in C minor and E♭ major) (Bortkiewicz)
- Piano Concerto No. 3 "Per aspera ad astra" (Sergei Bortkiewicz)
- Piano Concerto No. 1 (Arthur De Greef)
- Piano Concerto (Delius)
- Piano Concerto No. 1 (Concerto capriccioso) (Théodore Dubois)
- Piano Concerto No. 7 (Field)
- Piano Concerto No. 2 (Herz)
- Piano Concerto (Tyzen Hsiao)
- Piano Concerto No. 1 (Jadassohn)
- Piano Concerto No. 4 (Kapustin)
- Piano Concerto No. 2 (Kreutzer)
- Piano Concerto (Kullak)
- Concerto Symphonique No. 5 (Litolff)
- Piano Concerto No. 1 (Medtner)
- Piano Concerto No. 2 (Medtner)
- Piano Concerto No. 7 "Pathétique" (Moscheles)
- Piano Concerto No. 24 (Mozart)
- Piano Concerto No. 2 (Rachmaninoff)
- Piano Concerto (Raff)
- Piano Concerto No. 4 (Ries)
- Piano Concerto No. 4 (Saint-Saëns)
- Piano Concerto No. 2 (Sauer)
- Piano Concerto No. 2 (Scharwenka)
- Piano Concerto No. 1 (Aloys Schmitt)
- Piano Concerto No. 1 (Shostakovich)
- Piano Concerto No. 2 (Stanford)
- Piano Concerto No. 3 (Sterndale Bennett)
- Piano Concerto No. 2 (Vladigerov)
- Piano Concerto No. 2 (Widor)

=== C♯ minor ===
- Piano Concerto (Amy Beach)
- Piano Concerto No. 5 (Cleve)
- Piano Concerto (Issay Dobrowen)
- Piano Concerto No. 2 (Miriam Hyde)
- Piano Concerto for the left hand (in C♯ minor and major), Op. 17 (Korngold)
- Piano Concerto No. 2 "The River" (Palmgren - Ends in E Major)
- Piano Concerto (Poulenc)
- Piano Concerto No. 3, Op. 55 (Ries)
- Piano Concerto (Rimsky-Korsakov)
- Piano Concerto No. 4 (Roger Sacheverell Coke)
- Piano Concerto No. 3 (Scharwenka)
- Piano Concerto (Wolf)

=== D minor ===
- Piano Concerto (Bohnke)
- Piano Concerto No. 2 (Bowen)
- Piano Concerto No. 1 (Brahms)
- Piano Concerto (Dreyschock)
- Piano Concerto No. 3 (Herz)
- Piano Concerto (Howell)
- Piano Concerto No. 1 (Kalkbrenner)
- Piano Concerto No. 5 (Koczalski)
- Concerto Symphonique No. 4 (Litolff)
- Piano Concerto No. 2 (MacDowell)
- Piano Concerto No.1 (Martucci)
- Piano Concerto No. 2 (Mendelssohn)
- Piano Concerto No. 20 (Mozart)
- Piano Concerto No. 2 (Cipriani Potter)
- Concerto for Two Pianos and Orchestra (Poulenc)
- Piano Concerto No. 3 (Rachmaninoff)
- Piano Concerto No. 3 (Röntgen)
- Piano Concerto (Rosenhain)
- Piano Concerto No. 4 (Rubinstein)
- Piano Concerto No. 2 (Aloys Schmitt)
- Piano Concerto No. 2 (Stenhammar)
- Piano Concerto No. 1 (Sterndale Bennett)
- Piano Concerto No. 2 (Stoyanov)
- Piano Concerto (Rudolf Tobias)
- Piano Concerto (Haydn Wood)

=== D♯ minor/E♭ minor ===
- Piano Concerto No. 1 (Miriam Hyde)
- Piano Concerto No. 1 (John La Montaine)
- Piano Concerto No. 1 (Lyapunov)
- Piano Concerto No. 2 (Alfredo Napoleão)
- Piano Concerto No. 1 (Trifonov)

=== E minor ===
- Piano Concerto No. 1 (Chopin)
- Piano Concerto No. 1 (Dohnanyi)
- Concerto for Piano and String Orchestra. The Toughest Decision of God (Grundman)
- Piano Concerto No. 1 (Jordan)
- Piano Concerto No. 2 (Kalkbrenner)
- Piano Concerto No. 2 (Lemba)
- Piano Concerto No. 3 (Medtner)
- Piano Concerto No. 3 (unfinished) (Felix Mendelssohn)
- Piano Concerto (Mosonyi)
- Piano Concerto No. 2 (Reinecke)
- Piano Concerto No. 6 (Röntgen)
- Piano Concerto No. 1 (Rubinstein)
- Piano Concerto No. 1 (Sauer)

=== F minor ===
- Piano Concerto (Arensky)
- Piano Concerto No. 2 (Chopin)
- Piano Concerto No. 2 (Théodore Dubois)
- Piano Concerto No. 3 (Dupont)
- Piano Concerto No. 1 (Glazunov)
- Piano Concerto (Henselt)
- Piano Concerto No. 5 (Herz)
- Piano Concerto No. 1 (Hiller)
- Piano Concerto No. 2 (Jadassohn)
- Piano Concerto No. 3 (Kapustin)
- Concerto for Two Pianos and Persussion (Kapustin)
- Piano Concerto No. 3 (Lemba)
- Piano Concerto (Reger)
- Piano Concerto No. 2 (Rozycki)
- Piano Concerto No. 4 (Scharwenka)
- Piano Concerto No. 4 (Sterndale Bennett)
- Piano Concerto No. 5 (Sterndale Bennett)
- Piano Concerto No. 2 (Tellefsen)
- Piano Concerto No. 2 (Weigl)
- Piano Concerto No. 1 (Widor)

=== F♯ minor ===
- Piano Concerto No. 1 (Balakirev)
- Piano Concerto (Bronsart)
- Piano Concerto (Burgmüller)
- Piano Concerto (Lūcija Garūta)
- Piano Concerto No. 2 (Hiller)
- Piano Concerto No. 3 (Lyudkevych)
- Piano Concerto (Magi)
- Piano Concerto No. 1 (Montague Phillips)
- Piano Concerto No. 1 (Rachmaninoff)
- Piano Concerto No. 1 (Reinecke)
- Piano Concerto (Scriabin)
- Piano Concerto No. 1 (Stojowski)

=== G minor ===
- Piano Concerto No. 3 "Fantasia" (Bowen)
- Piano Concerto (No. 11) Op. 49 (J. L. Dussek)
- Piano Concerto (Dvořák)
- Concerto Symphonique (d'Erlanger)
- Piano Concerto (Gipps)
- Piano Concerto No. 2 (Godard)
- Piano Concerto No. 3 (Golubev)
- Piano Concerto No. 2 (Kabalevsky)
- Piano Concerto No. 1 (Mendelssohn)
- Piano Concerto No. 3 (Moscheles)
- Piano Concerto No. 1 (Palmgren)
- Piano Concerto (Pejačević)
- Piano Concerto No. 2 (Prokofiev)
- Piano Concerto No. 4 (Rachmaninoff)
- Piano Concerto No. 1 (Rozycki)
- Piano Concerto No. 2 (Saint-Saëns)
- Piano Concerto No. 1 (Tellefsen)
- Piano Concerto (Viotti)
- Piano Concerto No. 4 (Vladigerov)
- Piano Concerto (Jozef Wieniawski)

=== G♯ minor/A♭ minor ===
- Concerto for Solo Piano (Alkan) (begins in G♯ minor and ends in F♯)
- Concerto for Two Pianos and Orchestra (Bruch)

=== A minor ===
- Glamour Concerto (Piano Concerto No. 1) (Boissier)
- Piano Concerto No. 4 (Bowen)
- Piano Concerto "The Red Hot" (Stephen Brown)
- Piano Concerto No. 4 (Cleve)
- Piano Concerto No. 3, Op. 214 (Czerny)
- Piano Concerto No. 1 (Eckhardt-Gramatté)
- Piano Concerto No. 1 (Godard)
- Piano Concerto No. 1 (Golubev)
- Piano Concerto (Grieg)
- Piano Concerto No. 6 (Herz) (with choral finale, orchestral parts lost)
- Piano Concerto No. 2 (Hummel)
- Piano Concerto No. 1 (Kabalevsky)
- Piano Concerto No. 3 (Kalkbrenner)
- Piano Concerto, Op. 2 (Kashperova)
- Piano Concerto (without opus number, string orchestra accompaniment) (Felix Mendelssohn)
- Piano Concerto No. 1 (MacDowell)
- Concerto Symphonique (Napravnik)
- Piano Concerto (Paderewski)
- Piano Concerto No. 4 (Aloys Schmitt)
- Piano Concerto (Robert Schumann)
- Piano Concerto (Clara Schumann)
- Highland Concerto (Arthur Somervell)
- Piano Concerto No. 1 (Stoyanov)
- Piano Concerto No. 1 (Vladigerov)
- Piano Concerto No. 2 (Weismann)

=== A♯ minor/B♭ minor ===
- Piano Concerto (Atterberg)
- Piano Concerto No. 2 (Cleve)
- Piano Concerto No. 2 (Arthur De Greef)
- Piano Concerto (Hannikainen)
- Piano Concerto No. 2 (Martucci)
- Piano Concerto No. 1 (Scharwenka)
- Piano Concerto No. 1 (Stenhammar)
- Piano Concerto No. 1 (Tchaikovsky)
- Piano Concerto No. 3 (Vladigerov)

=== B minor ===
- Piano Concerto No. 1, Op. 3 (Moritz Moszkowski)
- Piano Concerto No. 1, Op. 2 (Eugen d'Albert)
- Piano Concerto No. 2 (Dohnanyi)
- Symphonic Concerto (Furtwängler)
- Piano Concerto (Hamilton Harty)
- Piano Concerto No. 7 (Herz)
- Piano Concerto No. 3 (Hummel)
- Piano Concerto No. 1 (Koczalski)
- Concerto Symphonique No. 2 (Litolff)
- Piano Concerto No. 4 (Reinecke)
- Piano Concerto, Op. 4 (Bernhard Stavenhagen)

== See also ==
- Piano concerto
- List of compositions for piano and orchestra
- List of symphonies by key
