= Africa (Saint-Saëns) =

1891 fantasia for piano and orchestra

- Fantasia by Camille Saint-Saëns
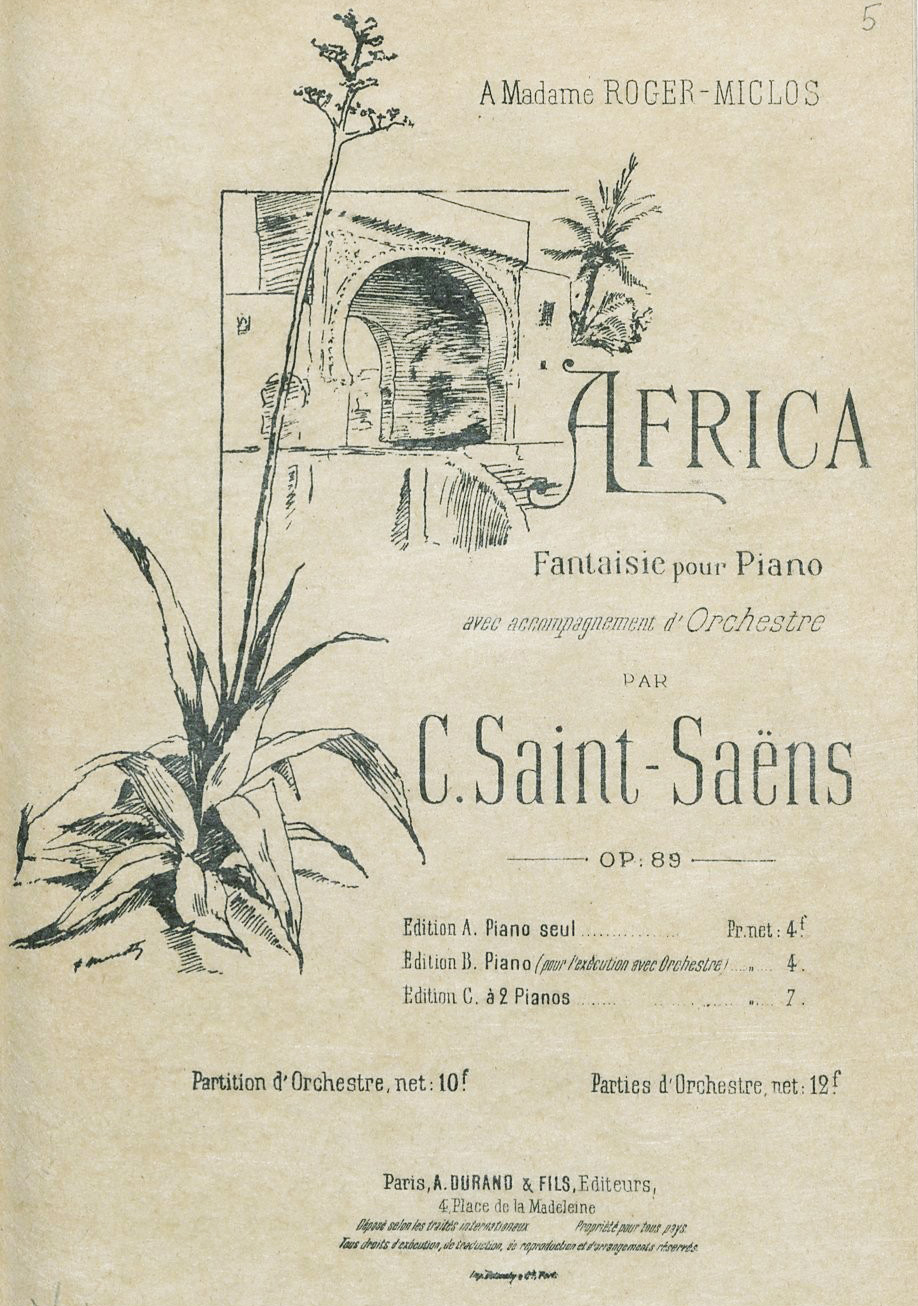
- Cover of first edition
- Key: G minor
- Opus: 89
- Composed: 1891
- Dedication: Marie-Aimée Roger-Miclos
- Published: November 1891 (orchestral parts); December 1891 (piano solo); February 1892 (orchestral score)
- Scoring: Piano and orchestra

Premiere
- Date: 25 October 1891
- Location: Paris
- Performers: Marie-Aimée Roger-Miclos; Édouard Colonne

Africa, Op. 89, is a fantasia for piano and orchestra by Camille Saint-Saëns. Composed in 1891 during a stay in Egypt, this concertante piece is marked by its mosaic-like structure and interplay of various themes, blending African musical elements with European compositional techniques.

Written during a period of personal grief following his mother's death, Saint-Saëns dedicated Africa to the pianist Marie-Aimée Roger-Miclos, to whom he had pledged a new composition. The work is held in a single movement and calls for outstanding technical virtuosity, agility, and a certain lightness of touch from the soloist, also reflecting Saint-Saëns's own formidable pianistic skill.

The premiere on 25 October 1891 was met with great acclaim, and subsequent performances took place around the globe, Saint-Saëns even considering it a signature work.

== History ==
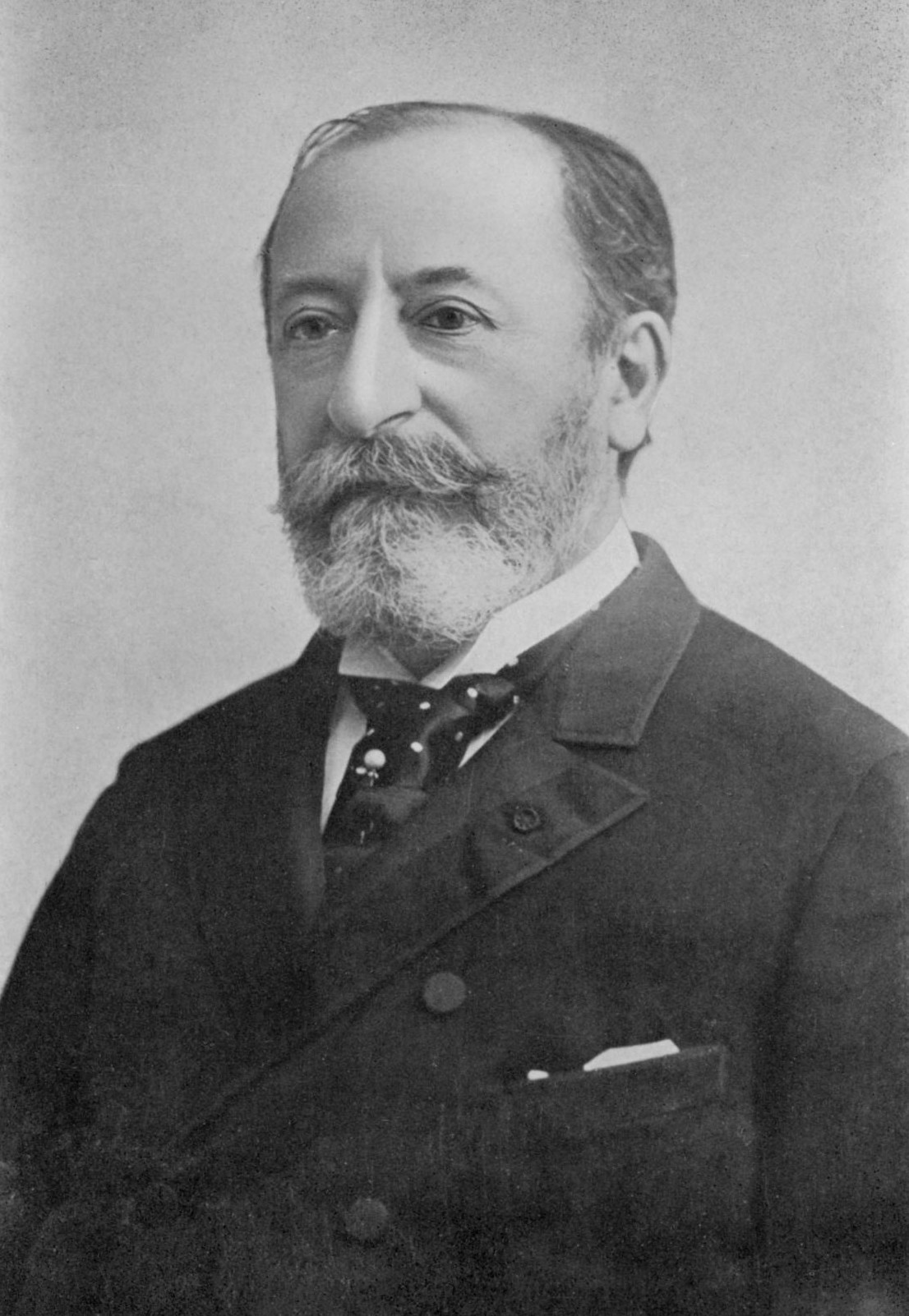
Camille Saint-Saëns

Following the loss of his mother in 1888, a devastated Camille Saint-Saëns contemplated suicide. Saint-Saëns had made a commitment to compose a new piece for pianist Marie-Aimée Roger-Miclos, and in a letter dated 20 September 1889 confessed to her to being struck by grief following his mother's death and unable to write a composition of any importance.

Battling his severe depression, Saint-Saëns sought solace in his favorite retreats, Egypt and Algeria. It was during this time that he found inspiration for Africa, a fantasia which draws heavily from North African influences. Saint-Saëns began the composition in March 1891 while he was in Cairo and completed it within a month, though continuing working on the orchestration in Algiers in June. The score was first published in Paris by his longtime publisher Auguste Durand: in October 1891, an arrangement for two pianos was the first to be published, orchestral parts were prepared in November, the piano solo version was completed in December, and the orchestral score appeared in February 1892. In a letter to Durand, Saint-Saëns described the work as a derivative of the Suite algérienne, Op. 60, and expressed his hope that it might overshadow his Rhapsodie d'Auvergne, Op. 73, as it was "more developed".

Despite Saint-Saëns's apprehensions about the piece's performance challenges, Roger-Miclos enthusiastically took on the work, expressing her confidence in her ability to master it. The premiere was held on 25 October 1891 at the Concerts du Châtelet in Paris, performed by Roger-Miclos and conducted by Édouard Colonne. Subsequent performances took place throughout Europe and in the United States, often with Saint-Saëns himself at the piano.

== Analysis ==
External audio
- Africa, performed by Jean-Philippe Collard with the Royal Philharmonic Orchestra under André Previn

Africa features various African musical elements that are incorporated into a European compositional framework. Parts of the piece are written in what is likely the nawâthar mode, a musical scale frequently used in Egyptian music:

According to musicologist Jann Pasler, the work can be divided into four parts and contains several distinct themes, which he tags as "A" through "I." The themes display a range of moods and textures and create the mosaic-like structure of a fantasia. They vary from aggressive (E and G), which are to be played marcato and fortissimo, to more folk-like and dance-like themes (H and I) that evoke a contrast with the more assertive themes. The succession of themes also recalls Arabic Nuba, a North African multi-movement music form. The piano and orchestra often alternate their articulation of the theme or its fragments, creating a varied sonic landscape.

Structure of Africa
I	A → piano cadenza → A' → piano → B → A'' → piano → C → D → D' → piano cadenza → A
II	E → ^{E}_{A} → E' → piano → F
III	G → G → B' → H → G' → H → I → F → G
IV	piano G → ^{G}_{A} → E → F' → piano

Africa begins with an interpretation of a tune heard by Saint-Saëns in Biskra (Theme A), a gateway settlement to the Sahara Desert. The theme, which is based on the musical traditions of the Chaoui people, begins with the oboe repeatedly emphasizing E, and then evolves into syncopated rhythmic patterns that play on the offbeats, creating a sense of instability.

After developing into a lengthy piano cadenza ad libitum, Saint-Saëns modulates to a different key and creates Western counterpoint between the piano and other instruments. He then introduces Theme B (Andante espressivo) in E♭ major, characterized by its folk-like tonal melody. It is performed slower and is more lyrical, offering a stark contrast in tempo, mood and character compared to the rest of the piece. The simplicity of the harmonic progression (I–I^{7}–I, I–III–I, and III–III^{7}-I) suggests that Saint-Saëns sought to emphasize its compatibility with Western music.

Rhythmic ostinati are also introduced to portray African rhythms in the composition. In the Meno allegretto section, a rhythmic motif (Theme C) presents a structure over which Saint-Saëns expresses himself freely with rapid octave descents and arpeggios.

Theme D is distinguished by its dance-like melody, the melismas of the oboe's high A, and the rhythmic ostinato on weak beats in the low register. These four themes give rise to a quasi-closed rondo structure (ABACDA) in the first part of the music.

With the second part of the piece, the focus shifts to the more aggressive themes E and G. These motifs are intended to be performed marcato and fortissimo, and particularly Theme E governs this section. Theme E utilizes the Arabic scale Maia (D♭, E♭, F, A♭, B♭, C) and oscillates around D♭, generating an assertive, aggressive atmosphere. However, this aggressiveness eventually dissipates as it modulates to G major and transforms into a variant, E', marked leggiero e tranquillo, before vanishing into chromatic arabesques and a long chromatic scale.

Theme F is a complex motif primarily consisting of triplet sixteenth notes in G major, alluding to a "swarm of drunken wasps". Theme F also serves to prepare the assertive theme G.

The third part forms a second rondo-like arch. With its binary, well-balanced rhythms, Theme G has a bombastic quality that makes it easy to remember. Like theme E, G becomes more lyrical later in G'. Theme A returns and is momentarily superimposed on themes E and G.

The third part also introduces Themes H and I, which pass quickly but add a folk-like quality to the overall atmosphere. These motifs bring a sense of playfulness and tranquility amidst the aggressive musical elements. Theme H is developed almost as if by Bach, evoking a dance:

Theme I is played only in the orchestra and turns in place within a fourth, with a bare tremoli accompaniment and a simple repeating rhythm in the low bass.

In the final part, Saint-Saëns explores the virtuosic capabilities of the piano once more, accentuating light and nimble playing. The section opens with an Animato, characterized by rapid sixteenth notes played in oscillating octaves, high on the piano, and fortissimo. As this initial intensity subsides, the aggressive Theme G is reintroduced in the bass, delivered marcato. Themes A can then be heard beneath G, followed by Theme E in thick chords. This forceful progression of Themes A, E, and G is momentarily offset by a softer return of the lighter Theme F, played leggierissimo in thirds. The piece concludes with a rapid return of the aggressive motifs A, E, and G, followed by the lighter motif F, and finally ends with seven percussive G-major chords.

== Instrumentation ==
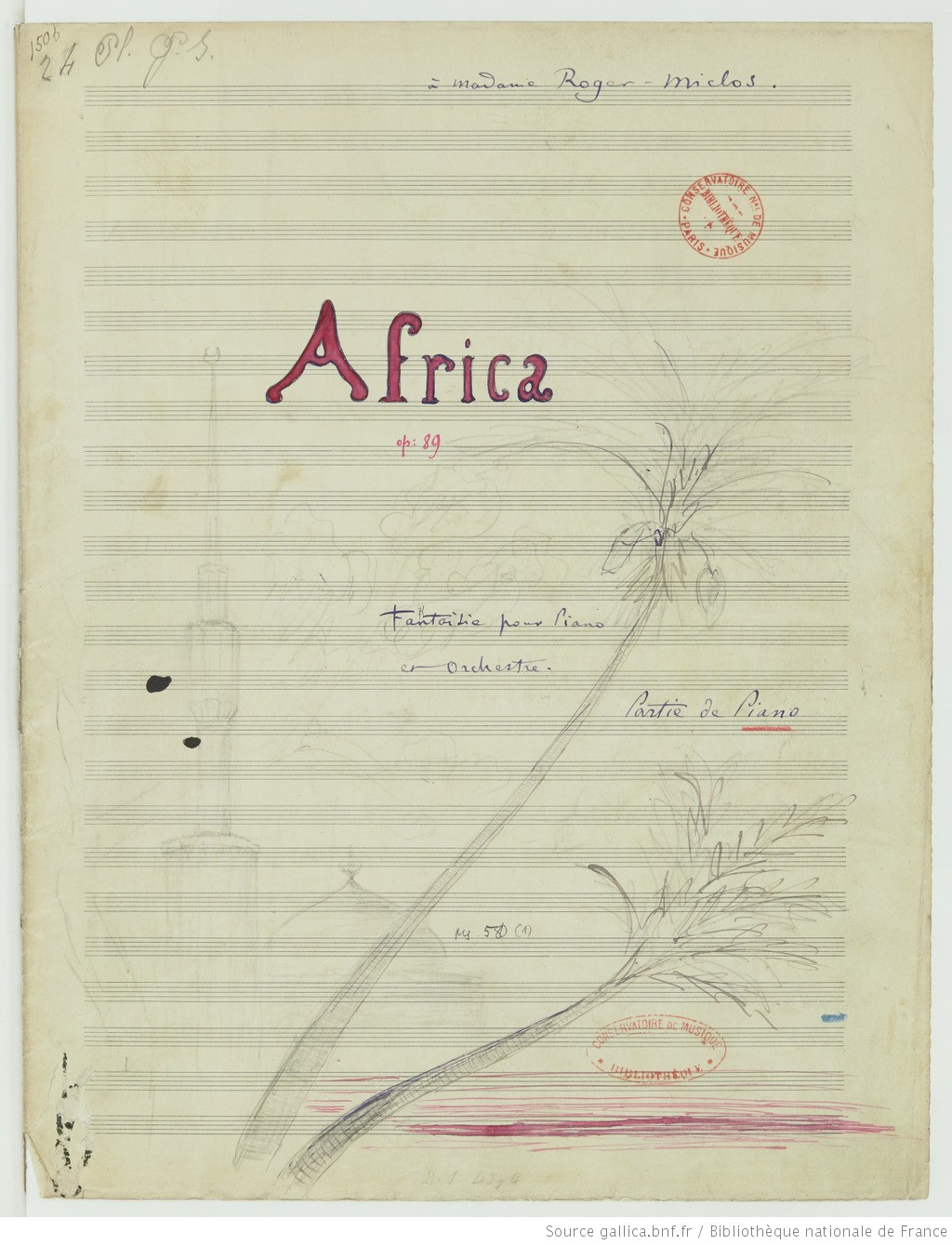
The autograph of the piano part contains sketches of an African scene

Africa is scored for solo piano and an orchestra consisting of 2 flutes, 2 oboes, 2 clarinets, 2 bassoons, 2 horns, 2 cornets, 3 trombones, timpani, triangle, cymbals, and strings. Saint-Saëns also made arrangements of the piece for two pianos and for piano solo.

The piano part is highly virtuosic and demands technical brilliance and agility from the performer. The piece features rapid passages, intricate cross-rhythms, and extensive use of the entire range of the piano. Saint-Saëns, who was an exceptional pianist himself, clearly wrote the piece to show off the talents of the pianist. The varying timbres, textures, and tempi also demonstrate the piece's virtuosity; in correspondence, Saint-Saëns has also highlighted the "lightness" and "suppleness" required to play Africa.

== Legacy ==
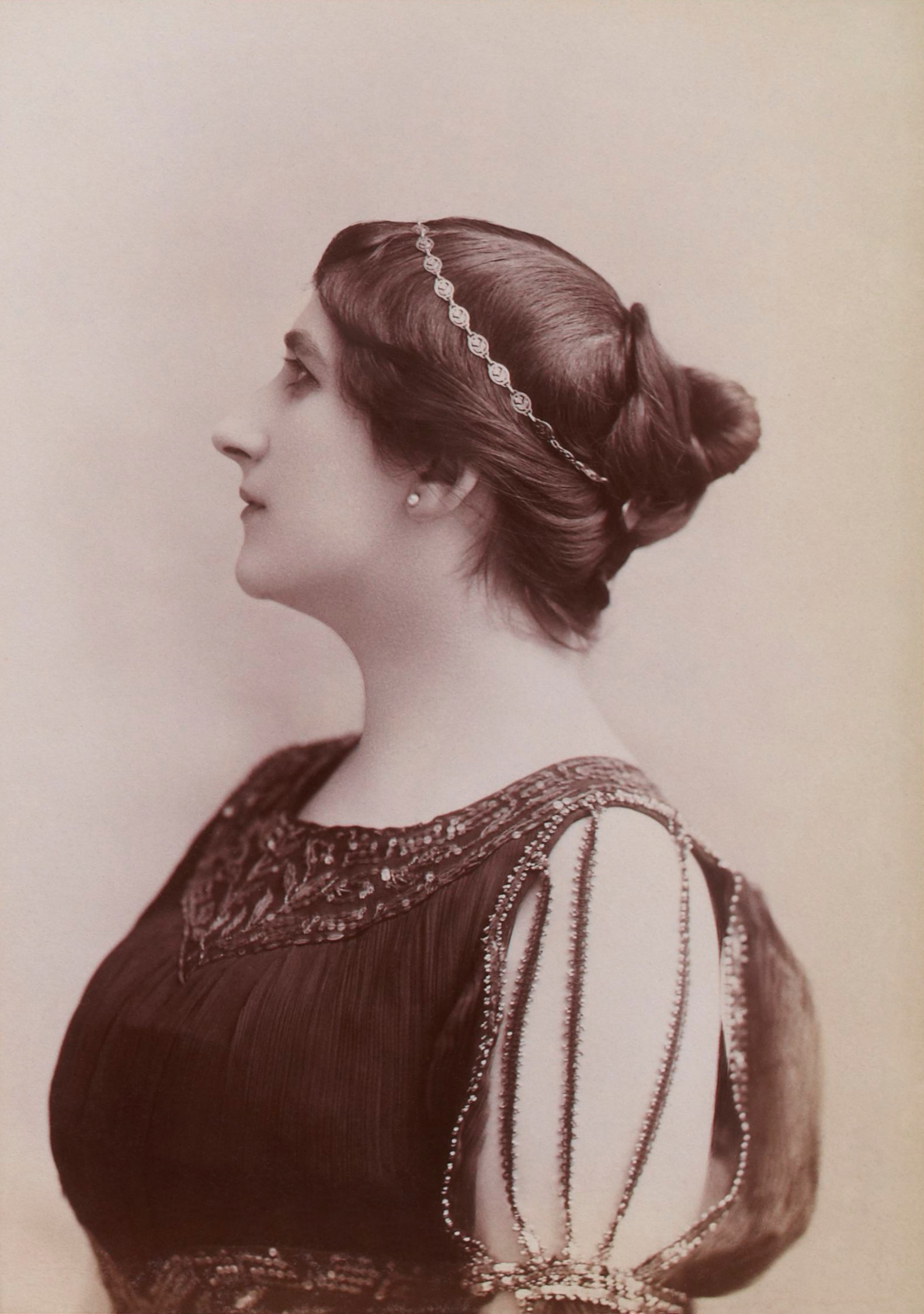
Marie-Aimée Roger-Miclos, the dedicatee, who premiered the piece

Africa's premiere was a triumph for Saint-Saëns. A reviewer for the journal L'Art musical praised the composition for its "exquisite finesse", its "captivating and stylish finish", and its "truly ingenious details in the orchestration". Africa was performed around the world, including Cambridge (1893), London (1913), Rio de Janeiro (1903), and New York (1906). In much of his correspondence during this period, Saint-Saëns frequently expressed his satisfaction with the piece and its performances, proclaiming that Africa "fits me like a glove, I play it effortlessly, without worry". When Africa was played in April 1893 in Algeria, the audience called for an encore. Despite the piece's African influences, an Algerian critic nonetheless deemed it quintessentially French.

In 1901, a reviewer for the journal Le Ménestrel also praised Marie-Aimée Roger-Miclos, the dedicatee, for her performance of the work, highlighting "her delicate and light hands" in the finale, "pianissimos of an exquisite velvety-softness," and "elements kept in the shadows needed for preserving the quasi-dreamlike, even veiled character of certain Moorish songs."

In Germany, where Saint-Saëns had not been for many years, Africa was less well received, perhaps also due to political resentments. Following a performance in Berlin in October 1906, which also included the fifth piano concerto (The Egyptian), Ernst Eduard Taubert wrote in Die Musik: "These African-Arabian motives, this geographical music, delivered especially in such large doses, really are of less interest to the public who attend these concerts." Likewise, the Allgemeine musikalische Zeitung reported that Saint-Saëns performed his works "in the most consummate manner imaginable under his masterful hands" but that did not make them "any more interesting."

Alfred Cortot wrote of Africa: "One might be tempted to see this piece as a less picturesque and less flavorful response to certain passages of the Egyptian Concerto, perhaps precisely because it leans toward a more active virtuosity. There's a similar attention to outward appearances in the choice of themes, which are oriental only in a derivative sense; a matching melodic contour that even extends to using a motif common to both pieces; and a similarity in the timbral relationships between the piano and the orchestra."

== Recordings ==
External audio
- Improvised cadenza on Africa, performed by Saint-Saëns (1904)

Africa is among the first compositions that were recorded featuring its composer as the soloist; a 78 rpm recording made on 26 June 1904, where Saint-Saëns improvises on the work's cadenza, gives an idea of his pianistic technique.

Recordings of the work include:

Year	Piano	Orchestra	Conductor	Length	Label	Catalogue
2022	Alexandre Kantorow	Tapiola Sinfonietta	Jean-Jacques Kantorow	10:32	BIS	BIS2400
2017	Romain Descharmes	Malmö Symphony Orchestra	Marc Soustrot	11:26	Naxos	8573477
2015	Louis Lortie	Bergen Philharmonic Orchestra	Neeme Järvi	9:54	Chandos	CHSA5162
2014	Philippe Entremont	L'orchestre du Capitole de Toulouse; Toulouse Capitol Orchestra	Michel Plasson	10:24	Sony	88843013272
2004	Jean-Philippe Collard	Royal Philharmonic Orchestra	André Previn	10:48	Warner Classics	5862452
2001	Stephen Hough	City of Birmingham Symphony Orchestra	Sakari Oramo	9:47	Hyperion	CDA67331-2
2001	Angela Brownridge	Hallé Orchestra	Paul Murphy	9:35	ASV	CD QSS 262
1997	Laura Mikkola	Tapiola Sinfonietta	Jean-Jacques Kantorow	10:58	BIS	BISCD790
1997	Gabriel Tacchino	Orchestra of Radio Luxembourg	Louis de Froment	11:02	Vox	CD3X3028
1993	Gwendolyn Mok	London Philharmonic Orchestra	Geoffrey Simon	11:05	Cala	CACD1015
