= Piano Concerto No. 3 (Saint-Saëns) =

Concerto by Camille Saint-Saëns

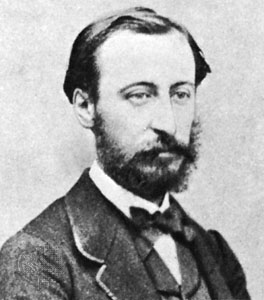
Camille Saint-Saëns in 1875

The Piano Concerto No. 3 in E♭ major, Op. 29 by Camille Saint-Saëns, was composed in 1869. The concerto is written in three movements.

When the concerto was first performed by Saint-Saëns himself at the Leipzig Gewandhaus on 27 November 1869 it was not well received, possibly because of its harmonic experimentation. It is not as often performed as his famous second concerto or the fourth or fifth concertos, but it is still an important addition to the piano concerto repertoire. It was dedicated to Élie-Miriam Delaborde, a pianist who is believed to have been the natural son of Charles-Valentin Alkan.

== Music ==
The concerto is scored for 2 flutes, 2 oboes, 2 clarinets, 2 bassoons, 2 horns, 2 trumpets, 3 trombones, timpani, and strings.

The piece follows standard concerto form. The first movement is brisk and in sonata form, the second movement is slow, and the third movement is fast. The length of the concerto is approximately 29 minutes.

The three movements are:

1. Moderato assai
2. Andante
3. Allegro non troppo

=== I. Moderato assai ===
The first movement begins in E♭ in common time with the piano playing large and rapid arpeggios. The main theme is then presented by the orchestra. The piano continues the arpeggios while the orchestra elaborates the theme. Later, the piano presents the second theme of the exposition, less rustic than the first, marked molto tranquillo, which is perhaps unique by being played by the piano by itself without any accompaniment, as well as for being in a distant key (D major). A technically brilliant cadenza follows. The cadenza is unusual because it occurs very early in the first movement rather than in its customary place at the end. The development follows after the cadenza. The piano employs many pianistic devices such as parallel octaves, rapid arpeggio and scale figures, and polyrhythms. The recapitulation follows and later the coda, profuse with octaves and large chords. The movement lasts about 14 minutes.

=== II. Andante ===
The second movement is in E major and is in 3/4. The movement is feverish and slow. The main theme is presented in the orchestra and varied and developed throughout the movement. The movement continues without pause into the third movement. It lasts about 7 minutes.

=== III. Allegro non troppo ===
The third movement is in E♭ major and is in 2/4. It is rapid and hectic with florid melodies. There are many technical difficulties confronting the soloist, including many octaves, rapid arpeggio and scale figures, and large chords. The concerto ends in an exhilarating coda. It lasts about 8 minutes.

== Recordings ==
- Aldo Ciccolini, piano, Orchestre de Paris, conducted by Serge Baudo. 2 CD Emi 1971. Choc de Classica 2019
- Philippe Entremont, piano, l'Orchestre du Capitole de Toulouse, conducted by Michel Plasson. 2 CD CBS 1976
- Gabriel Tacchino, piano, Orchestra Of Radio Luxembourg, conducted by Louis De Froment "Complete Works For Piano And Orchestra" 3 LP Vox 1976 / reprint: CD Brilliant Classics
- Pascal Rogé, piano, London Philharmonic Orchestra, conducted by Charles Dutoit. 2 CD Decca 1986.
- Stephen Hough, piano, City of Birmingham Symphony Orchestra, conducted by Sakari Oramo. 2 CD Hyperion 2000 - 2001. Gramophone Awards record of the year 2002. Diapason d'Or, Choc Le Monde de la Musique.
- Alexandre Kantorow, piano, Tapiola Sinfonietta, conducete by Jean-Jacques Kantorow (with piano concertos n°4 & 5). CD Bis 2019. Diapason d'or, Choc de Classica.
