= Piano Concerto No. 5 (Saint-Saëns) =

1896 work by Camille Saint-Saëns

- Egyptian
- by Camille Saint-Saëns
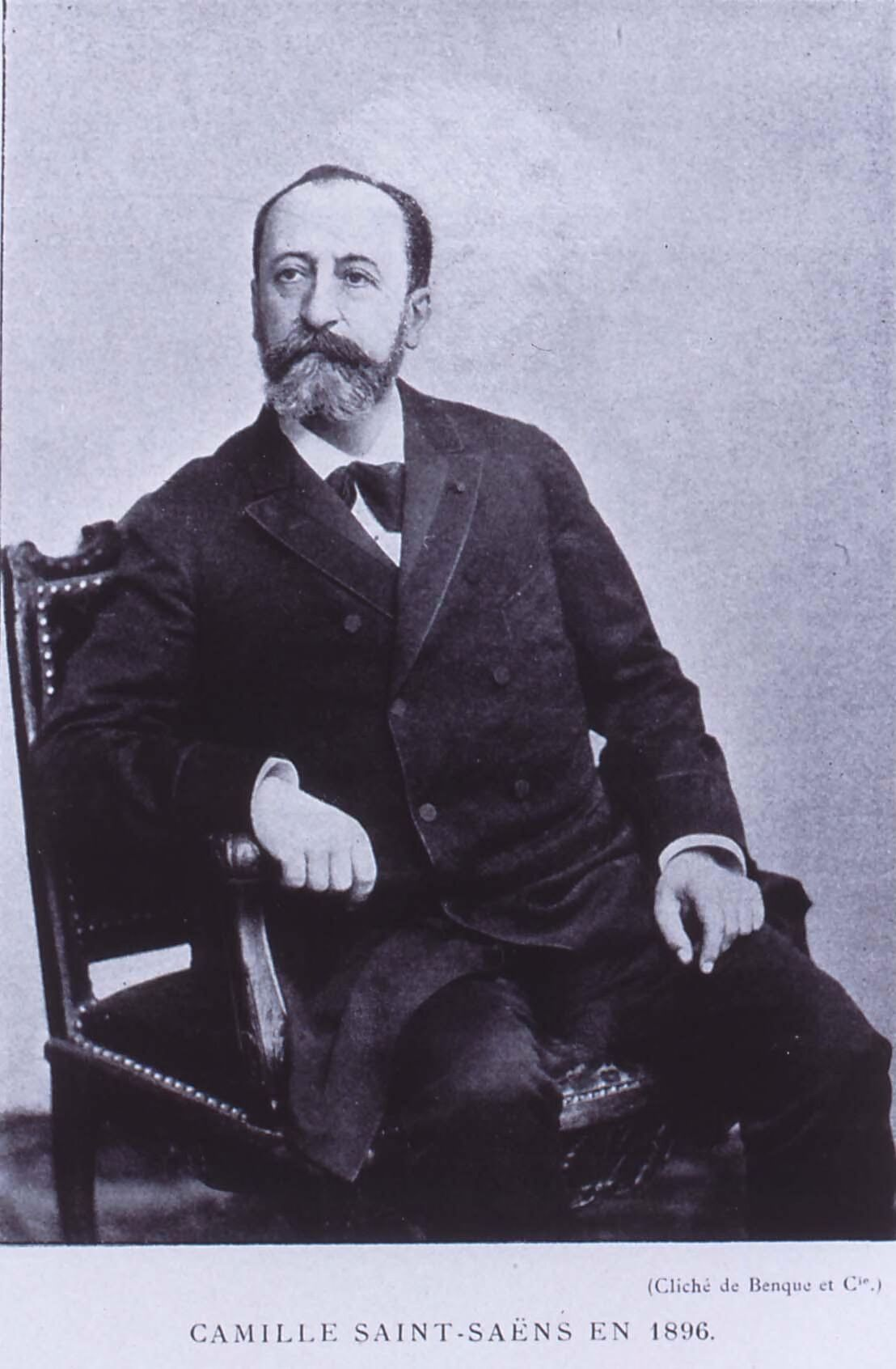
- Saint-Saëns, at the time he completed and premiered the concerto
- Key: F major
- Opus: 103
- Genre: Concerto
- Style: Romantic era
- Composed: 1896
- Dedication: Louis Dimmer
- Published: 1896
- Movements: 3
- Scoring: Piano; orchestra

Premiere
- Date: 2 June 1896
- Location: Salle Pleyel, Paris
- Conductor: Paul Taffanel
- Performers: Camille Saint-Saëns

The Piano Concerto No. 5 in F major, Op. 103, popularly known as The Egyptian, was Camille Saint-Saëns' last piano concerto. He wrote it in 1896, 20 years after his Fourth Piano Concerto, to play himself at his own Jubilee Concert on June 2 of that year. This concert celebrated the fiftieth anniversary of his début at the Salle Pleyel in 1846.

This concerto is nicknamed "The Egyptian" for two reasons. Firstly, Saint-Saëns composed it in the temple town of Luxor while on one of his frequent winter vacations to Egypt, and secondly, the music is among his most exotic, displaying influences from Javanese and Spanish as well as Middle-eastern music. Saint-Saëns said that the piece represented a sea voyage.

Saint-Saëns himself was the soloist at the première, which was a popular and critical success.

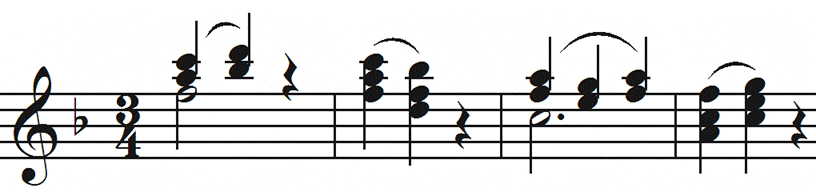
The main melody of Saint-Saëns' fifth piano concerto.

== Music ==
The concerto is scored for solo piano, piccolo, 2 flutes, 2 oboes, 2 clarinets, 2 bassoons, 4 horns, 2 trumpets, 3 trombones, timpani, tam tam, and strings.

The concerto has three movements:

1. Allegro animato
2. Andante
3. Molto allegro

=== I. Allegro animato ===
The first movement alternates several times between two contrasting themes. It begins warmly, introducing a simple subject on the piano, which is imbued at each new variation with increasing energy by a brilliant and technically challenging piano part featuring runs up and down the keyboard. This dissolves into a much slower, more melancholic subject, recalling that of the Andante sostenuto movement of Saint-Saëns' second piano concerto. Like waves, the two lead into one another until finally the second theme gives way to a gentle coda.

=== II. Andante ===
The Andante, traditionally the slow and expressive movement in concerto form, begins literally with a bang; the timpani punctuate an orchestral chord followed by an intensely rhythmic string part and an ascending and descending exotic run on the piano. This exciting introduction segues into the thematic exposition based on a Nubian love song that Saint-Saëns heard boatmen sing as he sailed on the Nile in a 'dahabiah' boat. Lush and exotic, this is the primary manifestation of the Egyptian sounds of the piece and probably the source of the nickname. Toward the end of the section, the piano and orchestra produce impressionistic sounds representing frogs and the chirping of Nile crickets.

=== III. Molto allegro ===
The soloist begins the third Molto allegro with low rumbles suggesting the sounds of ships' propellers before exhibiting a vigorous and bustling first theme that rushes all over the piano. The piano continues in its dizzying motion as the woodwinds and strings bring in a driving new melody. The two combine and overlap, creating an active tension that Saint-Saëns uses to great dramatic effect, concluding the movement with a triumphant flourish. He later adapted these themes in 1899 for the Toccata that closes the Opus 111 series of piano études.

== Recordings ==
Classic recordings of this work by Hisatada Odaka and Kazuko Yasukawa are not currently available. Selected recordings presently available include:

- Magda Tagliaferro and the Orchestre Lamoureux, conducted by Jean Fournet. Recorded 1954. Reported on 3 CD set with other composers APR 2021. Diapason d’or
- Jeanne-Marie Darré and the Orchestre National de la Radiodiffusion Française, conducted by Louis Fouretier. Recorded 1957. Reported on a 2-CD set with all 5 Saint-Saëns piano concertos (Emi classics 1996)
- Philippe Entremont and the Orchestre national du Capitole de Toulouse conducted by Michel Plasson. (Columbia Masterworks) on a 2-CD set with all 5 Saint-Saëns piano concertos. recorded 1976
- Gabriel Tacchino, piano, Orchestra Of Radio Luxembourg, conducted by Louis De Froment "Complete Works For Piano And Orchestra" 3 LP Vox 1976 / reprint: CD Brilliant Classics
- Jean-Philippe Collard and the Royal Philharmonic Orchestra conducted by André Previn. (EMI 86245), on a 2-CD set with all 5 Saint-Saëns piano concertos. Recorded 1987
- Aldo Ciccolini and the Orchestre de Paris conducted by Serge Baudo EMI 585183, on a 2-CD set with all 5 Saint-Saëns piano concertos. Recorded 1971
- Idil Biret, piano, Bilkent Symphony Orchestra, conducted by Jean Fournet. CD IBA BMP. Recorded 1999
- Anna Malikova and the WDR Symphony Orchestra conducted by Thomas Sanderling, Cologne (Audite 92.510), on a 2-SACD set with all 5 Saint-Saëns piano concertos. Recorded 2010
- Pascal Rogé and the Royal Philharmonic Orchestra conducted by Charles Dutoit. Decca 443 865–2 (2 cd set with all 5 Saint-Saëns piano concertos). Recorded 1981
- Sviatoslaw Richter and the Moscow Youth Orchestra, conducted by Kirill Kondrashin. LP Le Chant du Monde, 1955 (reported on CD 2008)
- Sviatoslaw Richter and the Radio-Sinfonieorchester Stuttgart des SWR, conducted by Christoph Eschenbach. CD Schwetzingen SWR Festspiele. Recorded 1993
- Stephen Hough and the City of Birmingham Symphony Orchestra conducted by Sakari Oramo. Hyperion CDA67331/2 (2 CD set with all 5 Saint-Saëns piano concertos and other works). Recorded 2000. Diapason d'or, Choc Le Monde de la Musique
- Mūza Rubackyté and the Lithuanian National Philharmonic Orchestra, conducted by Hans Martin Schneidt (with Piano concerto n°2, conducted by Alain Pâris). Live record. CD Doron music 2014
- Louis Lortie and the BBC Philharmonic Orchestra (complete piano concertos n°1, n°2, n°3, n°4, n°5), conducted by Edward Gardner (en). 2 CD Chandos 2018–2019
- Bertrand Chamayou and the Orchestre National de France, conducted by Emmanuel Krivine. CD Erato 2019 – Gramophone Award, Choc de Classica
- Alexandre Kantorow and the Tapiola Sinfonietta, conducted by Jean-Jacques Kantorow. SACD Bis 2019 – Diapason d'or, Choc de Classica
- Clélia Iruzum, piano, Royal Philharmonic Orchestra, conducted by Jac Van Steen. CD Somm recordings 2020
- Jean-Yves Thibaudet, piano, Orchestre de la Suisse Romande, conducted by Charles Dutoit. CD Decca 2007
