= Piano Concerto No. 2 (Saint-Saëns) =

1868 musical work by Camille Saint-Saëns

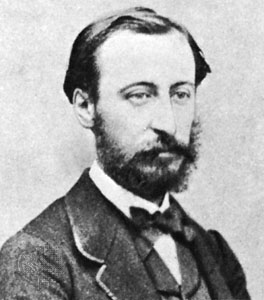
Saint-Saëns in 1875

The Piano Concerto No. 2 in G minor, Op. 22 by Camille Saint-Saëns was composed in 1868 and is probably Saint-Saëns' most popular piano concerto. It was dedicated to Madame A. de Villers (née de Haber).

At the première on 13 May, the composer was the soloist and Anton Rubinstein conducted the orchestra. Saint-Saëns wrote the concerto in three weeks and had very little time to prepare for the première; consequently, the piece was not initially successful. The capricious changes in style provoked Zygmunt Stojowski to quip that it "begins with Bach and ends with Offenbach."

== Overview ==
I. Andante sostenuto

II. Allegro scherzando

III. Presto
Performed by Bogyeong Lee with the University of Iowa Chamber Orchestra under William LaRue Jones

The concerto is scored for solo piano, 2 flutes, 2 oboes, 2 clarinets, 2 bassoons, 2 horns, 2 trumpets, timpani, crash cymbals and strings. A performance lasts around 23 minutes.

It follows the traditional form of three movements but allows for more freedom in tempo markings. Normally, the first movement is fast-paced, while the second is slower, but the first movement here is slow and the second movement has a scherzo-like quality, resulting in a form resembling a typical four-movement symphony but lacking the first movement (a form also represented by Beethoven's Moonlight Sonata).

The movements in the concerto are:

1. Andante sostenuto (in G minor and sonata form)
2. Allegro scherzando (in E♭ major and sonata form)
3. Presto (in G minor and sonata form)

=== I. Andante sostenuto ===
The concerto begins with a piano solo playing a long improvisational introduction in the style of a Bach fantasia. After the orchestra enters, the restless and melancholy first theme is played, again by the piano solo. Saint-Saëns drew the theme from his student Gabriel Fauré's abandoned Tantum ergo motet. A brief second theme appears, followed by a middle section of increasing degrees of animato. The main theme is recapitulated fortissimo and the soloist is given a long ad libitum cadenza. The Bach-like opening motif returns in the coda.

=== II. Allegro scherzando ===
The second movement is in E♭ major and, instead of being a typical adagio, resembles a scherzo. The mercurial piano part is marked leggieramente, and the two main themes are clever and light-hearted. The energetic, delicate personality of this particular movement is characteristic of Saint-Saëns' musical wit, most famously observable in Le Carnaval des Animaux.

=== III. Presto ===
The concerto concludes by returning to G minor. Like the preceding movement, it moves quickly; this time the form is an extremely fast, fiery saltarello, in sonata form, featuring a strong triplet figure. At presto speed, the orchestra and soloist rush tumultuously along, gaining volume and momentum and finishing in a whirlwind of G minor arpeggios.

== Influences ==
The concerto, particularly the second movement, heavily influenced fellow French composer Gabriel Pierné's Piano Concerto in C minor of 1887. The composer was also very fond of Chopin's Scherzo n. 4, which may have influenced this movement.

Georges Bizet wrote a transcription of the concerto for solo piano.

The concerto is featured in the 2020 film "Nocturne".

The third movement of the concerto heavily influenced the soundtrack "Etude for Ghost" in the game Mother 3.

== Recordings ==
- Benno Moiseiwitsch, piano, London Philharmonic Orchestra, conducted by Basil Cameron. 1947, report CD Naxos 2002,
- Benno Moiseiwitsch, piano, Royal Philharmonic Orchestra, conductor Sir Eugene Goossens 1960, report CD Classica (Les introuvables) 2020 (3^{e} mouvement)
- Moura Lympany, piano, London Philharmonic, dir. Jean Martinon. LP London records 1951
- Arthur Rubinstein, piano, New York Philharmonic Orchestra, conductor Dimitri Mitropoulos (Live 19/04/1953). CD Guild Music 2009
- Emil Gilels, piano, Orchestre de La Société des Concerts du Conservatoire, conductor André Cluytens. LP Columbia 11/1954, report SACD Praga 2013. Diapason d'or. piano concerto n°4
- Daniel Adni, piano, Royal Liverpool Philharmonic Orchestra, Sir Charles Groves. LP EMI 1976
- Arthur Rubinstein, piano, Symphony Of The Air, conductor Alfred Wallenstein LP RCA Victor 1958 report CD BMG Classics 1996
- Malcolm Binns, piano, London Philharmonic Orchestra, conductor Alexander Gibson. LP World Record Club 1968
- Orazio Frugoni, piano, Pro Musica Symphony Vienna, conductor, Hans Swarosky (with concerto n°5). LP Turnabout/Vox 1976
- Ruth Slenczynska, piano, Symphony of the Air, conductor Henry Swoboda LP Decca 1959 report DG Éloquence 2020. Diapason d'or 2021
- Grigory Sokolov, piano, URSS Symphony Orchestra, conducted by Neeme Järvi. LP Melodie Angel 1966
- Gabriel Tacchino, piano, Orchestra Of Radio Luxembourg, conducted by Louis De Froment "Complete Works For Piano And Orchestra" 3 LP Vox 1976 / reprint: CD Brilliant Classics
- Arthur Rubinstein, piano, The Philadelphia Orchestra, conductor Eugene Ormandy. CD RCA Victor 1970 report CD Sony 2013.
- François-René Duchable, piano, Orchestre Philharmonique de Strasbourg, conductor Alain Lombard. CD Erato 1982.
- Cécile Ousset, piano, City of Birmingham Symphony Orchestra, conductor Simon Rattle. CD Emi 1982
- Nelson Freire, piano, Radio Symphonie-Orchester Berlin, conductor Adam Fisher.Live recording 1986. CD Audite Musikproduktion 2017.
- Israel Margalit, piano, London Philharmonic Orchestra, conductor Bryden Thomson. CD Chandos 1987
- Stephen Hough, piano, City of Birmingham Symphony Orchestra, conductor Sakari Oramo. 2 CD Hyperion 2000 - 2001. Gramophone Awards record of the year 2002. Diapason d'or, Choc Le Monde la Musique.
- Peter Toperczer, piano, Slovac Philharmonic, conductor Zdenek Kosler. CD Naxos 2000
- Nicolaï Petrov, piano, (Georges Bizet's single piano transcript, 1868). CD Olympia 2002
- Franz Vorraber, piano, Anhaltische Philarmonie Dessau, conductor Golo Berg. CD Thoroffon (Bella Musica) 2003
- Brigitte Engerer, piano, Ensemble Orchestral de Paris, conductor Andrea Quin (with concerto n°5). CD Mirare 2008
- Howard Shelley, piano, Orchestra of Opera North, piano and conducting, CD Chandos 2009
- Benjamin Grosvenor, piano, Royal Liverpool Philharmonic Orchestra, conductor James Judd, CD Decca 2012
- Emmanuel Despax, piano, Orpheus Sinfonia, conducted by Thomas Carroll. CD Signum classics 2013
- Louis Schwizgebel, piano, BBC Symphony Orchestra, conductor Fabien Gabel (with concerto n°5). CD Aparté 2015
- Vadym Kholodenko, piano, Orchestre de la Radio Norvégienne, conductor Miguel Harth-Bedoya. CD Harmonia Mundi 2016. Grand piano tuning: Renee Ingeberg
- Andrew von Oeyen, piano, PKF-Prague Philarmonie, conductor Emmanuel Vuillaume. CD Warner Classics 2017
- Bertrand Chamayou, piano, Orchestre National de France, conductor Emmanuel Krivine. CD Erato 2019. Gramophone Awards, Choc de Classica.
- Nathanaël Gouin, piano, (Georges Bizet's single piano transcript 1868). CD Mirare 2020
- Jeanne-Marie Darré, piano, Orchestre National de la Radiodiffusion Française, conductor Louis Fourestier, recorded 1955. Published as CD EMI Music France 1996
