= Nathanaël Gouin =

French pianist (born 1988)

- Born: March 5, 1988 (age 38)
- Origin: France
- Occupation: Classical pianist
- Instrument: Piano

Nathanaël Gouin (born 5 March 1988) is a French classical pianist.

== Early Life ==
Born in Colombes in the northwestern suburbs of Paris, Gouin began studying piano and violin at the age of 3. Trained at the Conservatoire de Toulouse, he obtained his piano and chamber music prizes in Thierry Huillet's and Frédéric Vaysse-Knitter's classes. He was received unanimously at the Conservatoire de Paris. He followed courses at the Juilliard School in New York, and also at the Hochschule für Musik Freiburg and University of Music and Performing Arts Munich as well as at the Académie Musicale de Villecroze. He perfected his skills with Maria João Pires, Louis Lortie, Avedis Kouyoumdian , Jean-Claude Pennetier and also Dimitri Bashkirov. He trained at the Conservatories of Toulouse and Paris, the Juilliard School in New York, as well as the Hochschulen für Musik of Freiburg im Breisgau and Munich, the Villecroze Music Academy, and completed a four-year residency at the Queen Elisabeth Music Chapel.

== Career ==
He is a sought-after soloist who regularly performs in concertos with orchestras such as the Liège Philharmonic, Les Siècles , the New Japan Philharmonic, the Orchestre National d’Île-de-France, the Brussels Philharmonic, Ensemble Matheus, and the Sinfonia Varsovia , under the direction of conductors such as Karina Canellakis , Giancarlo Guerrero , Christopher Warren-Green , Jean-Christophe Spinosi and Augustin Dumay . He also performs on every continent and is invited to prestigious venues such as the grand Salle Pierre Boulez at the Philharmonie de Paris and the Cité de la Musique in Paris, La Seine Musicale in Boulogne-Billancourt, the Midem in Cannes, the Salle Bourgie in Montreal, and the Bozar and the Salle Flagey in Brussels, not to mention festivals such as those of La Roque d’Anthéron, Radio France Montpellier, Les Flâneries Musicales in Reims, Piano aux Jacobins in Toulouse, Les Folles Journées in Nantes/Tokyo/Warsaw/Yekaterinburg, and many others.

In 2016, he released a recording of Édouard Lalo’s Piano Concerto with the Liège Philharmonic under the direction of Jean-Jacques Kantorow (Outhere label), a recording that received rave reviews. Chamber music is obviously very present in his artistic life, and he is a regular partner of great performers such as Alexandra Conunova , Renaud Capuçon , Augustin Dumay , Astrig Siranossian, and Raphael Sévère . He played many four hands concerts with the Portuguese pianiste Maria Joao Pires ( Japan, Canada, Europe), who presented him to the public as part of the Partitura project, a concept that combines different generations of musicians in sharing the stage.

The album "Dear Mademoiselle" (Alpha), featuring the students of Nadia Boulanger, conceived with cellist Astrig Siranossian with the participation of Daniel Barenboim and for which Nathanaël Gouin made the transcriptions, has also received high praise. He also performs in duo with violinist Guillaume Chilemme (Ravel/ Canal+ recording and Schubert) and in trio with cellist Yan Levionnois and G. Chilemme (Beethoven Korngold album - Mirare). He is a frequent guest on television programs such as the Victoires de la Musique Classique (France 3) and on Radio Classique and France Musique.

In 2025, he founded the Notte Bianca orchestra , composed of brilliant chamber musicians, which aims to oﬀer an innovative musical and scenical new experience of stage. Giving numerous masterclasses, he teaches piano at the Alfred Cortot Ecole Normale in Paris in 2024. He is also a composer, and creates numerous works for piano, voice and orchestra.

== Prizes and distinctions ==
He has won numerous international competitions; In 2009 he won first prize at the Johannes Brahms Competition in Pörtschach, Austria, as well as the Swedish Duet Competition (1st prize) and the Lyon Chamber Music Competition.

== Selected discography ==
- Maurice Ravel's Sonates pour violon et piano (Maguelone) with Guillaume Chilemme
- Édouard Lalo's Piano Concerto in F minor (Alpha) with conductor Jean-Jacques Kantorow
- Franz Liszt Macabre ( Mirare) 2017
- Dear Mademoiselle - A Tribute to Nadia Boulanger (with cellist Astrig Siranossian) Alpha 2020
- Georges Bizet Without words (Mirare) 2020
- Caprices : Bach Brahms Rachmaninov Alkan Fauré Hahn Ohana - Solo Recital
- Sir : Britten cello sonata and Elgar with Astrig Siranossian (Alpha 2026)
- Water Music : Solo Recital full transcriptions from Nathanaël Gouin ( Mirare 2027 )
