= Ruth Slenczynska =

American pianist (1925–2026)

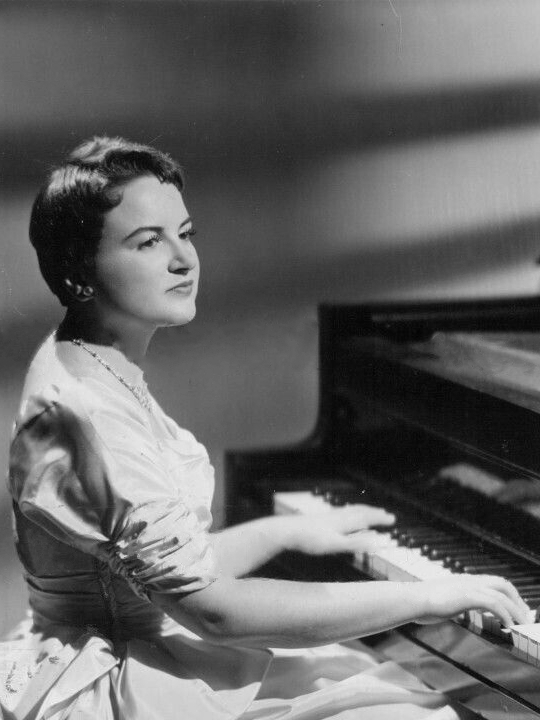
- Slenczynska, c. 1957
- Born: January 15, 1925; Sacramento, California, U.S.
- Died: April 22, 2026 (aged 101); Cupertino, California, U.S.
- Education: University of California, Berkeley
- Occupations: Classical pianist; Academic teacher
- Organizations: Southern Illinois University Edwardsville
- Spouse(s): George Born (m. 1944; div. 1953) James Kerr (died 2000)

Ruth Slenczynska (January 15, 1925 – April 22, 2026) was an American classical pianist and the last living piano student of Sergei Rachmaninoff. She was a child prodigy, pushed by her father, debuting with a full orchestra at age seven. She abandoned a career as a concert pianist at age 15, married at age 19 and began studies. She returned to performing in 1951 after a break of more than 10 years, and began to teach piano, from 1964 to 1987 as artist-in-residence at the Southern Illinois University Edwardsville. Her final album was released in 2022.

== Life and career ==
Slenczynska was born in Sacramento, California, on January 15, 1925. Her Polish father, Joseph Slenczynski (Józef Ślenczyński), was a violinist. Pushed by her father and starting at age three, Slenczynska was forced to practice the piano relentlessly. At age three, her father took her to Europe to study. She made her recital debut at age four. She played her debut in Berlin at age six and made her debut with a full orchestra in Paris at age seven. In 1934 she met Sergei Rachmaninoff after having stepped in for him for a concert. She then studied with him and also with Artur Schnabel, Egon Petri, Alfred Cortot, and Josef Hofmann. Slenczynska became Rachmaninoff's last living pupil.

At age 15, Slenczynska was overwhelmed by the pressure of a career as a concert pianist; she left home, abandoned her career as a musician, and studied psychology at the University of California, Berkeley. In 1944, when she was 19, she married a student, George Born. She returned to performing in concerts in 1951 after a break of more than 10 years. That same year, she took part in the Carmel Bach Festival. After the marriage ended in a divorce in 1953, she started teaching piano for a living.

Slenczynska was accepted as a music student by the University of California, Berkeley. In 1957, she published a book of memoirs, Forbidden Childhood, which deals with life as a child prodigy, and a book on piano technique, Music at Your Fingertips: Aspects of Pianoforte Technique. That same year she clarified the pronunciation of her surname for the Los Angeles Times: "Slen-chin-ska." In 1964, she accepted a full-time position at Southern Illinois University Edwardsville (SIUE) as artist-in-residence, a title she retained until 1987. A large assortment of her memorabilia and recordings constitutes a Special Collection in the Lovejoy Library at SIUE. Slenczynska contributed articles to trade journals including Clavier, Piano Quarterly, and Keyboard. In 2022, at age 97, she recorded her first album in nearly 60 years, My Life in Music. Slenczynska received an honorary doctorate from the Curtis Institute of Music the same year.

=== Personal life ===
In the 1960s, she married the political scientist James Kerr, who died in 2000. She turned 100 on January 15, 2025. Slenczynska died at an assisted living facility in Cupertino, California, on April 22, 2026, at the age of 101.

== Recordings ==
Slenczynska made recordings with Decca Classics between 1959 and 1963 that were reissued on ten CDs to mark her 96th birthday.

- Complete American Decca recordings, containing:
  - Chopin
    - Les 24 préludes
    - Les 24 Études
    - Les 16 valses
    - Les quatre impromptus
    - Les quatre scherzo
    - Les quatre ballades
    - Polonaise, Op. 53
  - Liszt/Chopin: Six chants polonais
  - Liszt
    - Rhapsodie espagnole
    - Rhapsodie hongroise, No. 15
    - Étude, No. 5
  - Niccolò Paganini: 6 grandes études
  - Saint-Saëns
    - Concerto pour piano n°1
    - Concerto pour piano n°2
  Decca (1956/1962). 10 CD DG Eloquence 2020. OCLC 1444357840 Diapason d'or 2021.
- My Life in Music, works by Bach, Rachmaninoff, Chopin, Debussy, Barber, and others, Decca 2022 OCLC 1313911945

Slenczynska also recorded for Aca digital, Ivory and Deutsche Grammophon.

== Publications ==
- with Biancolli, Louis: Forbidden Childhood, NY, 1957. OCLC 3860198
- Music at Your Fingertips, NY, 1961 (1976, 1986), Da Capo Press. ISBN 978-0-306-80034-4 OCLC 993507225
- On Preparations for a Piano Competition. Seventh National Chopin Piano Competition, March 2005
- Thoughts on Memorizing, herberttsang.com

=== Articles in trade journals ===
Slenczynska contributed articles to trade journals including Clavier, Piano Quarterly and Keyboard

- Haydn's Sonata No. 35 in A Flat. Clavier, 1972, Vol. 11, Issue n. 5, pp 18–25.
- Follow-up on Haydn. Clavier, 1972, Vol. 11, Issue n. 7, pp 18–26.
- The Opening of the Rachmaninov Second Concerto. Clavier, 1973, Vol. 12, Issue n. 7, p 18.
- Practice and Performance Suggestions for Rachmaninoff's Etude-Tableau, No. 2. Clavier, 1973, Vol. 12, Issue n. 7, p 29.
- Grandfatherly Guidance. Clavier, 1973, Vol. 12, Issue n. 7, pp 15–16.
- Learning Approaches to Chopin's Prelude in E Major, Op. 28, No. 9. Piano Quarterly, 1973, Vol. 21, Issue n. 81, pp 26–31.
- Build Your Own Career. Music Journal, April 1974, Vol. 32, p. 12.
- Learning Approaches to Chopin's Prelude in C Scharp Minor, Op. 28, No. 10. Piano Quarterly, 1974, Vol. 22, Issue n. 85, pp 31–33.
- Good Octaves and How to Acquire Them (with list of music). Clavier, 1977, Vol. 16, Issue n. 3, pp. 37–41.
- Master Class: Rachmaninoff Prelude Op. 23, No. 4. Clavier, 1979, Vol. 18, Issue n. 9, pp 20–24.
- On Chopin's Unexpected Invitations to Dance. Piano Quarterly, 1979, Vol. 27, Issue n. 106, p 24.
- Private Lesson: Performance Techniques for 'Sonata K. 239' by Scriabin. Keyboard, Dec 1985, Vol. 11, pp 24–26
- Private Lesson: On Prokofiev's Vision Fuguitive XVI. Keyboard, Feb 1986, Vol. 12, pp 36–37.
- On Chopin's Unexpected Invitations to Dance. Piano Quarterly, 1979, Vol. 27, Issue n. 106, p 24.
- Private Lesson: Beyond Polyrhythms: a Chopin Rubato. Keyboard, Oct 1986, Vol. 12, p 93.
- Private Lesson: How a Pianist Works on Ear-Hand Coordination. Keyboard, Jan 1986, Vol. 12, p 112.
- Private Lesson: Gaining Left-Hand Awareness. Keyboard, Sep 1986, Vol. 12, p 109.
- Private Lesson: Polyrhythmical Skill, Two Against Three. Keyboard, May 1986, Vol. 12, p 27.
- Private Lesson: Exercises for Smooth Polyrhythms: Three Against Four. Keyboard, Jan 1986, Vol. 12, pp 32–33.
- Private Lesson: On Schumann's 'Important Event' from Kinderszenen. Keyboard, April 1986, Vol. 12, pp 32–33.
- Bach's 'Three Voiced Fugue in C Minor. Clavier, 1988, Vol. 27, Issue n. 1, pp 26–29.
