= Piano Concerto No. 1 in B-flat minor =

Piano Concerto No. 1 in B-flat Minor may refer to:

- Piano Concerto (Atterberg)
- Piano Concerto No. 1 (Scharwenka)
- Piano Concerto No. 1 (Stenhammar)
- Piano Concerto No. 1 (Tchaikovsky)

== See also ==
- List of piano concertos by key
