= Piano Concerto No. 4 (Saint-Saëns) =

Concerto composed by Camille Saint-Saëns

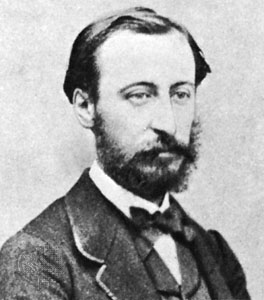
Saint-Saëns in 1875

The Piano Concerto No. 4 in C minor, Op. 44 was composed by Camille Saint-Saëns in 1875. It was premièred on October 31, 1875, at the Théâtre du Châtelet of Paris, with the composer as the soloist. The concerto is dedicated to Anton Door, a professor of piano at the Vienna Conservatory.

== Music ==
The concerto is scored for solo piano, 2 flutes, 2 oboes, 2 clarinets, 2 bassoons, 2 horns, 2 trumpets, 3 trombones, timpani and strings.

The fourth piano concerto is the composer's most structurally innovative piano concerto. In one sense, it is structured like a four-movement symphony, but these are grouped in pairs. That is, the piece is divided into two parts, each of which combines two main movements (I. A moderate-tempo Theme and Variations in C minor; II. A slower, related Theme and Variations in A♭ major; III. Scherzo in C minor; IV. Finale in C major). However, in each part there is a bridge-like transitional section, between the two main "movements" – for example, a fugal Andante in part II functions as an interlude between the two main triple-meter sections.

The two movements are:

1. Allegro moderato – Andante
2. Allegro vivace – Andante – Allegro

=== I. Allegro moderato – Andante ===
The first movement begins with a gently mischievous chromatic subject, heard in dialogue between the strings and piano soloist, and continues in a creative thematic development similar to Saint-Saëns' third symphony. The composer demonstrates brilliant skill in employing the piano and orchestra almost equally. In the Andante, he introduces a hymn-like theme with the woodwinds (also strikingly similar to the tune of the third symphony's final section), and uses this as a platform on which he builds a series of variations before bringing the movement to a quiet close.

=== II. Allegro vivace – Andante – Allegro ===
The Allegro vivace begins as a playful and cunning scherzo (although still in C minor), deriving its main theme from the original chromatic subject in the beginning of the first movement. There is a bold switch to 6/8 time, and the piano leads the orchestra into a new brief but energetic theme. Eventually the orchestra moves into a lush Andante, recapitulating the chorale-style melody. Rather suddenly, the piano climbs up to a flurry of double octave trills and a climactic trumpet fanfare, leading to the jubilant finale based once more on the hymn theme played at triple time. The concerto concludes with the piano, in cadenza-like cascades, guiding the orchestra to a fortissimo close.

== Recordings ==
- Alfred Cortot, piano, Orchestre de la Société des Concerts du Conservatoire, conducted by Charles Munch 1935. Report CD Naxos 2000
- Lélia Gousseau, piano, Orchestre National de la RTF, conducted by André Cluytens (Live 11/12/1956). CD INA 2014
- Jeanne-Marie Darré, Complete piano concertos, Orchestre de la Radiodiffusion française, conductedby Louis Fourestier. Recorded 1955–1957. 2 CD Emi 1996
- Alexander Brailowsky, piano, Boston Symphony Orchestra, conducted by Charles Munch. LP His Master's Voice 1954
- Grant Johannesen, piano, Philarmonia Orchestra, conducted by Georges Tzipine. LP His Master's Voice 1958
- Gabriel Tacchino, piano, Orchestra Of Radio Luxembourg, conducted by Louis De Froment "Complete Works For Piano And Orchestra" 3 LP Vox 1976 / reprint: CD Brilliant Classics
- Robert Casadesus, piano, New York Philharmonic, conducted by Leonard Bernstein. 1962. Report CD Sony 1993
- François-René Duchable, piano, Orchestre Philharmonique de Strsbourg, conducted by Alain Lombard (with piano concerto n°2). CD Erato 1982.
- Stephen Hough, City of Birmingham Symphony Orchestra, conducted by Sakari Oramo. CD Hyperion 2001. Gramophone Awards record of the year 2002. Diapason d'or, Choc Le Monde la Musique
- Jean-François Heisser, piano, Les Siècles, conducted by François-Xavier Roth. CD Actes Sud 2010
- Alexandre Kantorow, piano, Tapiola Sinfonietta, conducted by Jean-Jacques Kantorow (with piano concertos n°3 & 5). SACD Bis 2019. Diapason d'or, Choc de Classica
