= Preludes (Szymanowski) =

Preludes composed by Karol Szymanowski

Nine Preludes
- by Karol Szymanowski
- Karol Szymanowski in the 1910s.
- Opus: 1
- Year: 1896-1900
- Genre: Romanticism
- Published: 1906, Warsaw
- Duration: 18-20 minutes
- Scoring: Piano solo

Nine Preludes, op. 1, is a composition by Polish composer Karol Szymanowski (1882–1937). Written between 1896 and 1900 in the composer's youth, it is his first published work and bears the notable influence of Frédéric Chopin and Alexander Scriabin. The Preludes were published in 1906 in Warsaw.

== Composition and musicality ==
Before the composition of the Preludes, Szymanowski had already written a variety of piano works and songs, influenced by his upbringing in a highly musical environment. Many of these miniatures have not survived; this cycle is the only surviving work from the Szymanowski's early attempts at composition.

Szymanowski composed, according to contemporaries, frenetically and with assiduity. A fellow student from Szymanowski's time at the Warsaw Conservatory noted that the composer "would spend hours sitting over his music paper in deep concentration, covering the whole sheet with minute notes,” and that he would study pianistic passages from Chopin and Scriabin with "an utmost thoroughness". The Preludes were composed in two distinct time periods: nos. 7 and 8 were written in 1896 (when Szymanowski was only 14 years old) while the remaining seven were written four years later, in 1900.

The Nine Preludes are lyrical miniatures markedly influenced by Szymanowski's early fascination for the music of Chopin and Wagner; polish musicologist Zofia Helman observed that the Preludes were "shaped on Chopin's patterns, but directed towards contemporaneity" and deemed them "an authentic expression of youthful emotionalism". Musicologist Guy Sacre opinionated that the Preludes "bear witness to magnificent gifts—gifts that are not merely those of a follower or an epigone."

The Preludes make plentiful use of a Chopin-influenced approach to melodic lyricism, rich ornementation, polyrhythms, and innovative harmonic language featuring an intensely emotional use of dissonance. The pianistic textures lend towards an orchestral sound, but keep a distinctly introverted, intimate and particularly melancholic character: with the exception of Prelude No. 3, all of the nine preludes are written in a minor key, and all except for Prelude No. 5 are written in slow tempi.

== Preludes ==
=== 1. Andante ma non troppo in B minor (1900) ===
The opening prelude features a calmly nostalgic right-hand melody supported by a single accompanying voice in 2/4 time.

=== 2. Andante con moto in D minor (1900) ===
The second prelude is written in a highly improvisatory, rhapsodic style, with a legato rising melody in the right hand accompanied by a left-hand accompaniment on the offbeat. Soon enough, the melody is doubled at the octave and transformed into expressive chords, gaining intensity and reaching a climax but never resolving to the D minor chord until the pianississimo end of the piece.

=== 3. Andantino in D♭ major (1900) ===
This Andantino in D♭ major is the only piece of the set in a major key. It is also the shortest piece, written in only 25 bars, and never reaches a nuance above piano.

=== 4. Andantino con moto in B♭ minor (1900) ===
Tomasz Baranowski noted that this prelude, along with No. 3 and No. 6, reveal the influence of Wagner's Tristan und Isolde through not only their harmony and texture, but "also through a clear reminiscence of the motif from the introduction to that musical drama."

=== 5. Allegro molto – Impetuoso in D minor (1900) ===
The fifth prelude is the only fast-paced, virtuosic piece of the set. It breaks the serenely melancholic character of the other pieces by introducing a harsh, uncompromising miniature that finds harmonic relief only in the final chord.

=== 6. Lento – Mesto in A minor (1900) ===
This slow prelude is considered by some observers to be the most original of the set, featuring a large dramatic arc that "grows to Wagnerian proportions".

=== 7. Moderato in C minor (1896) ===
The seventh preludes is written in an improvisatory style with uncertain harmony, centered around a slow buildup to a C-minor climax.

=== 8. Andante ma non troppo in E♭ minor (1896) ===
The second-to-last Prelude of the set features a long, winding melody in the right hand moving up and down the highs of the piano. The music moves in and out of common time, occasionally venturing to bars in 3/4 and 5/4.

=== 9. Lento – Mesto in B♭ minor (1900) ===
The final piece shows a detachment from Chopin and Scriabin's influence to foreshadow the impressionistic approach that would later come to characterize much of Szymanowski's musical language.

== Reception and legacy ==
The publication of Szymanowski's Preludes "astonished listeners and professionals". For the work, Szymanowski received a special mention at the Konstanty Lubomirski Competition in Warsaw in 1903. Remembering that occasion, Zdzisław Jachimecki (author of the first biography about Szymanowski) wrote in 1927, "After the first, joyful impression on encountering these works, I was reminded of the cry with which Robert Schumann hailed the appearance of a youthful composition by Chopin".

Arthur Rubinstein, who included the pieces in his repertoire, examined the manuscript for the Preludes in 1904. He recalled: “There is no way to describe our amazement after playing the first few bars of the Prelude. This music has been written by a master! Frantically we have read all the manuscripts, and our enthusiasm and excitement grew, as soon as we realized that here we are discovering a great Polish composer.”

Jachimeki & Kindler wrote in 1922 that "the sonorous qualities of some of his preludes are an evidence of the composer's skill and refinement. There is not one banal idea."

The first two Preludes were transcribed for string quartet by fellow Polish composer Stanisław Mikuszewski in 1938, for the occasion of Szymanowski's consecration in Kraków. Ten years later in 1948, Grażyna Bacewicz transcribed the first Prelude for violin (or cello) and piano.

== Notable recordings ==
Year	Pianist	Album	Label	Comments
2005	Martin Roscoe	Szymanowski - Piano Works Vol. 4	Naxos	
2011	Frédéric Vaysse-Knitter	Szymanowski: Pieces for Piano	Integral	
2016	Magdalena Baczewska	Magdalena Baczewska plays Chopin & Szymanowski	Paraty	
2020	Mūza Rubackytė	Leopold Godowsky - Karol Szymanowski	Ligia	
2021	Joanna Domanska	Szymanowski: Piano Works Vol. 2	Dux	
2024	Krystian Zimerman	Karol Szymanowski: Piano Works	Deutsche Gramophon	Only Preludes No. 1, 2, 7 and 8 were recorded on this album.
