= Marie-Aimée Roger-Miclos =

French pianist

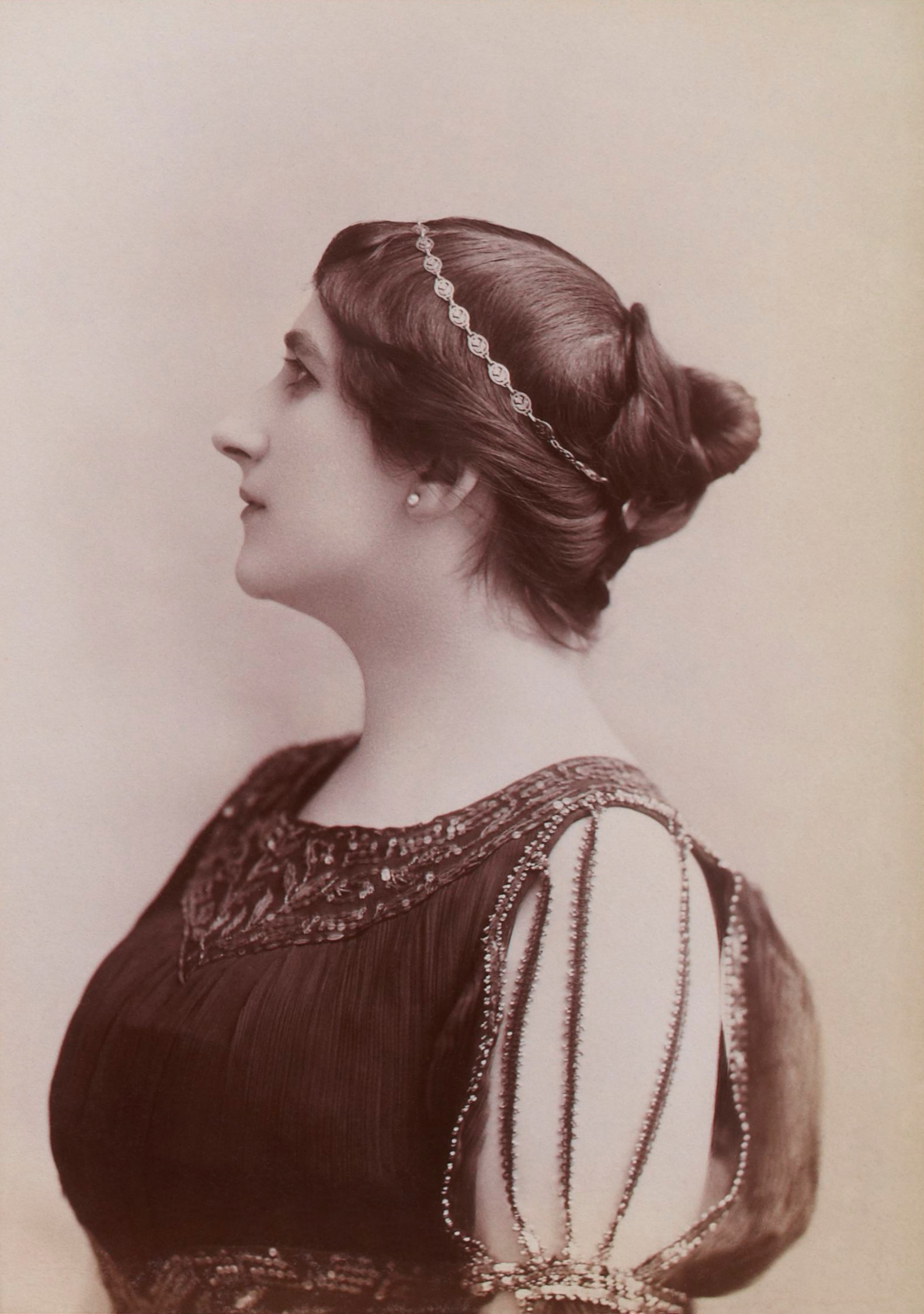
- Marie-Aimée Roger-Miclos by Léopold-Émile Reutlinger in 1902
- Born: May 1, 1860; Toulouse, France
- Died: May 19, 1951 (aged 91); Paris, France
- Other names: Aimée-Marie Roger-Miclos, Maria Roger-Miclos, Mme. Roger-Miclos-Battaille
- Occupation: pianist
- Years active: 1880s–1920s

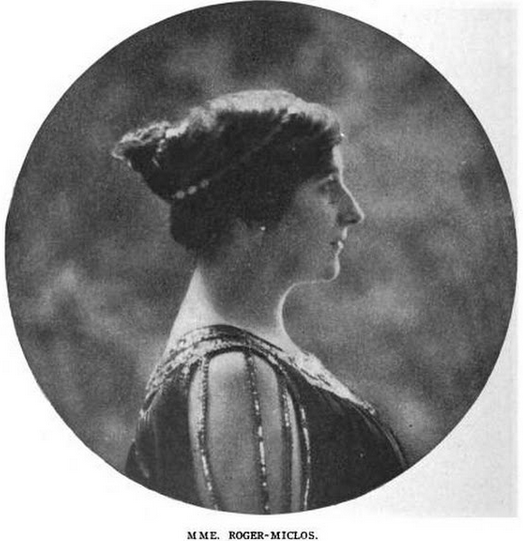
Marie-Aimée Roger-Miclos, from a 1903 publication.

Marie-Aimée Roger-Miclos (May 1, 1860 – May 19, 1951) was a French pianist. Born in Toulouse, she studied first there and then at the Paris conservatory, where she would one day teach. Several composers dedicated compositions to her, and she toured Europe and North America and produced recordings at the turn of the 20th century.

== Early life ==
Marie-Aimée Miclos was born in Toulouse. She studied at the Conservatoire de Toulouse and the Conservatoire de Paris, with Louise Aglaé Massart and with Henri Herz.

== Career ==
Several composers dedicated compositions to Roger-Miclos. Joseph O'Kelly dedicated a piano work to Roger-Miclos in 1884. Camille Saint-Saëns dedicated his Africa fantasia to Roger-Miclos, which she premiered in 1891 to great acclaim.

Roger-Miclos played in London in 1890 and 1894. She toured German-speaking cities in 1893, 1894, and 1897. She toured in the United States and Canada in the 1902–1903 season. "She comes from Southern France, the land of fire and passion, and is an artist of interesting and unconventional qualities, possessing a strongly marked sense of rhythm, brilliant and incisive touch, and her playing is marked with certainty, that adds tonal charm to brilliancy," observed one reviewer, adding "As a pianiste she is an artistic diplomat." In 1905, she made recordings of Mendelssohn and Chopin works.

She also taught piano, at the Paris Conservatoire. American painter George Da Maduro Peixotto made a portrait of her in 1893. She was also the subject of a medal made by French artist Geneviève Granger, exhibited in 1909.

== Personal life ==
Marie-Aimée Roger-Miclos married twice. Her first husband, Roger, was a railroad inspector; they married in 1881, and he died in 1887. Her second husband was fellow musician Louis-Charles Battaille, the son of Charles-Amable Battaille; they married in 1905, and he died in 1937. She died in Paris in 1951, aged 91 years.
