= Bohnke =

Bohnke is a diminutive of the German language occupational surname Bohn for a grower of beans. Notable people with the name include:

- Emil Bohnke (1888–1928), German violist, composer and conductor
- Felix Bohnke (1974), German musician
