= Piano Concerto No. 1 (Saint-Saëns) =

1858 piano concerto by Saint-Saëns

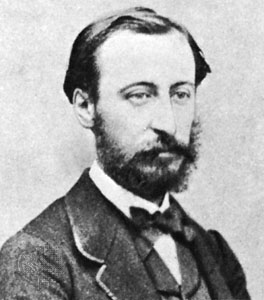
Saint-Saëns

The Piano Concerto No. 1 in D major, Op. 17, by Camille Saint-Saëns was composed in 1858, when the composer was 23 and dedicated to Marie Jaëll. It is the first piano concerto ever written by a major French composer.

== Music ==
The work is scored for solo piano, 2 flutes, 2 oboes, 2 clarinets, 2 bassoons, 4 horns, 2 trumpets, timpani, and strings. A notable feature is an opening triadic solo for the natural horn which predates the much more famous example of Brahms's Second Piano Concerto by around 20 years.

There are three movements:

1. Andante – Allegro assai
2. Andante sostenuto quasi adagio
3. Allegro con fuoco

=== I. Andante – Allegro assai ===
The piano concerto opens with a Wagnerian horn solo that fades to light strings, a soft piano melody, and more strings before breaking into the main theme of the piece. The horn is prevalent throughout, as are the strings, before concluding in D major.

=== II. Andante sostenuto quasi adagio ===
The second movement is very dark and falls slightly short of eerie; low, slow cellos back-dropped by plucking violins lead to a soft and slow piano melody. Meanwhile, the strings play a large part in the piece while the theme from the opening movement continues.

=== III. Allegro con fuoco ===
A thunderous finale mixes all of the themes from the horns, the piano and the strings in a uplifting and inspiring and blazing finale, ending in the key of D major.

== Recordings ==
- Jeanne-Marie Darré, piano, Orchestre National de la Radiodiffusion Française, conducted by Louis Fourestier. 2 CD EMI 1955 1957 report 1996
- Aldo Ciccolini, piano, Orchestre de Paris, conducted by Serge Baudo. 2 CD Emi 1971. Choc de Classica 2019
- Philippe Entremont, piano, Orchestre du Capitole de Toulouse, conducted by Michel Plasson, 2 CD CBS Sony 1976
- Gabriel Tacchino, piano, Orchestra Of Radio Luxembourg, conducted by Louis De Froment "Complete Works For Piano And Orchestra" 3 LP Vox 1976 / reprint: CD Brilliant Classics
- Jean-Philippe Collard, piano, Royal Philharmonic Orchestra, conducted by André Previn (2 CD EMI classics 1987).
- Pascal Rogé, piano, Philharmonia Orchestra, conducted by Charles Dutoit. 2 CD Decca 1981
- Stephen Hough, piano, City of Birmingham Symphony Orchestra, conducted by Sakari Oramo. 2 CD Hyperion 2001. Gramophone Awards Record of the Year 2002. Diapason d'Or, Choc Le Monde la Musique
- Anna Malikova, piano, WDR Symphony Orchestra Cologne, conducted by Thomas Sanderling. 2 SACD Audite 2010
