= Alexandre Kantorow =

French pianist

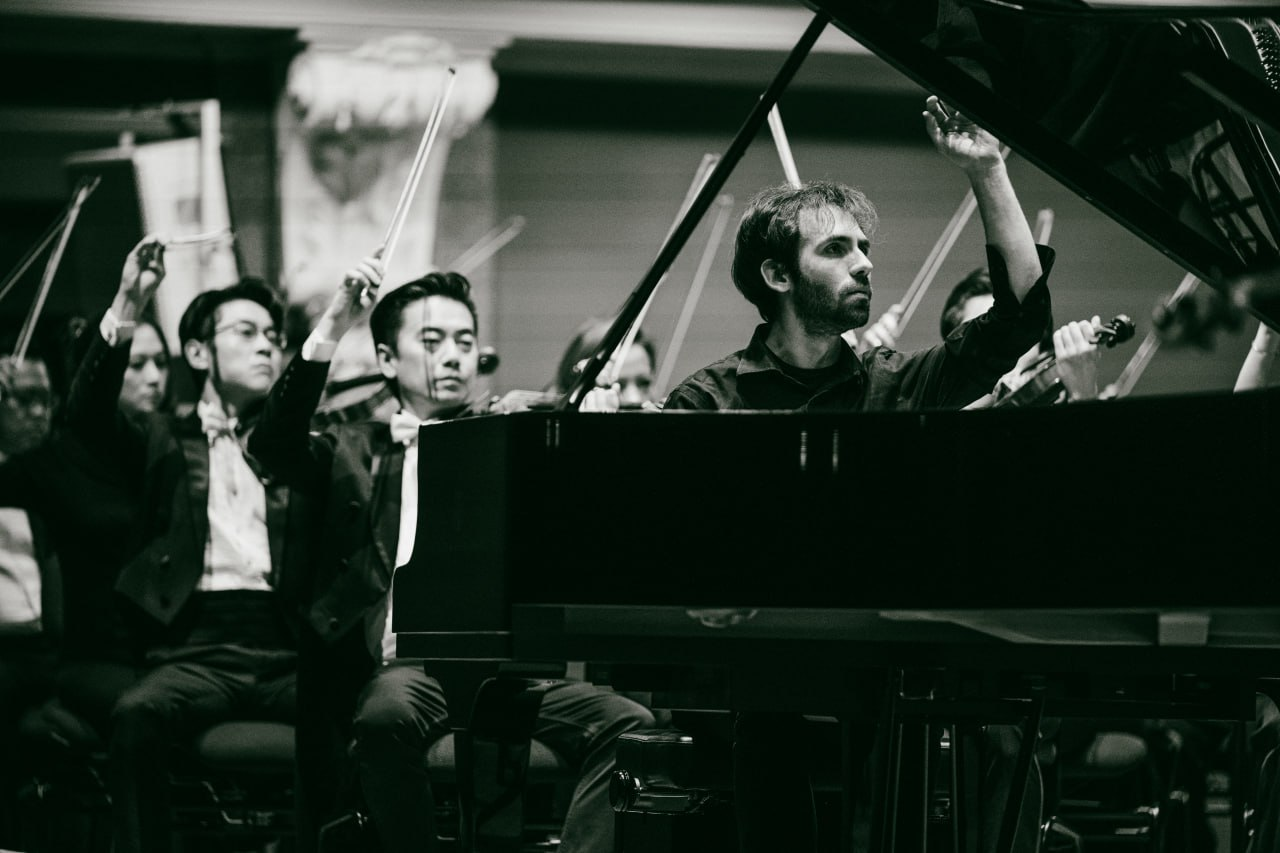
- Alexandre Kantorow at a concert in Basel, Switzerland, 2024

Background information
- Born: 20 May 1997 (age 29); Clermont-Ferrand, France
- Genres: Classical music
- Instrument: Piano
- Label: BIS Records
- Website: alexandre-kantorow.com

Alexandre Kantorow (born 20 May 1997) is a French pianist. Described by Gramophone as a "fire-breathing virtuoso with a poetic charm" and by Fanfare as "Liszt reincarnated", he won the first prize, gold medal and Grand Prix at the 16th International Tchaikovsky Competition in 2019. Kantorow was the first French winner in the history of the competition.

== Biography ==
Alexandre Kantorow was born in Clermont-Ferrand to a family of musicians in 1997. His father is the violinist and conductor Jean-Jacques Kantorow and his mother, Kathryn Dean, is also a violinist. His parents were reluctant to teach young Alexandre music, and "he stayed in nonspecialist schooling for as long as possible" to cultivate other interests. Besides music, Kantorow was interested in astrophysics, and wrote poetry.

Kantorow began to study piano at the age of five at the conservatory of Pontoise. At the age of 11, he began studies with Pierre-Alain Volondat, who was the winner of the 1983 Queen Elisabeth Competition in Belgium, and continued training with Igor Lazko at the Schola Cantorum de Paris, as well as with Frank Braley and Haruko Ueda. When he was 16 years old, Kantorow was invited to play at the La Folle Journée festival in Nantes and has since appeared at such festivals as the Festival de La Roque-d'Anthéron, the Festival Chopin à Paris, and the Festival Piano aux Jacobins. At the age of 17, he performed at the Philharmonie de Paris with the Pasdeloup Orchestra at its inaugural season to an audience of about 2,500. He has since appeared at major concert halls including the Konzerthaus Berlin, Concertgebouw in Amsterdam, the BOZAR in Brussels, and the auditorium in the Louis Vuitton Foundation. After Lazko, Kantorow studied with Rena Shereshevskaya, who was also the teacher of Lucas Debargue, at the École Normale de Musique de Paris. Shereshevskaya's views on music are unorthodox for modern musicologists: she thinks "that everything in music stemmed from Bach, and that, by using and enriching this musical language, all composers are connected through a kind of universal ur-meaning". When Kantorow started to study with Shereshevskaya, he already thought about the International Tchaikovsky Competition; his training was "compared to that of an athlete’s, was done with a view to drilling Kantorow’s subconscious".

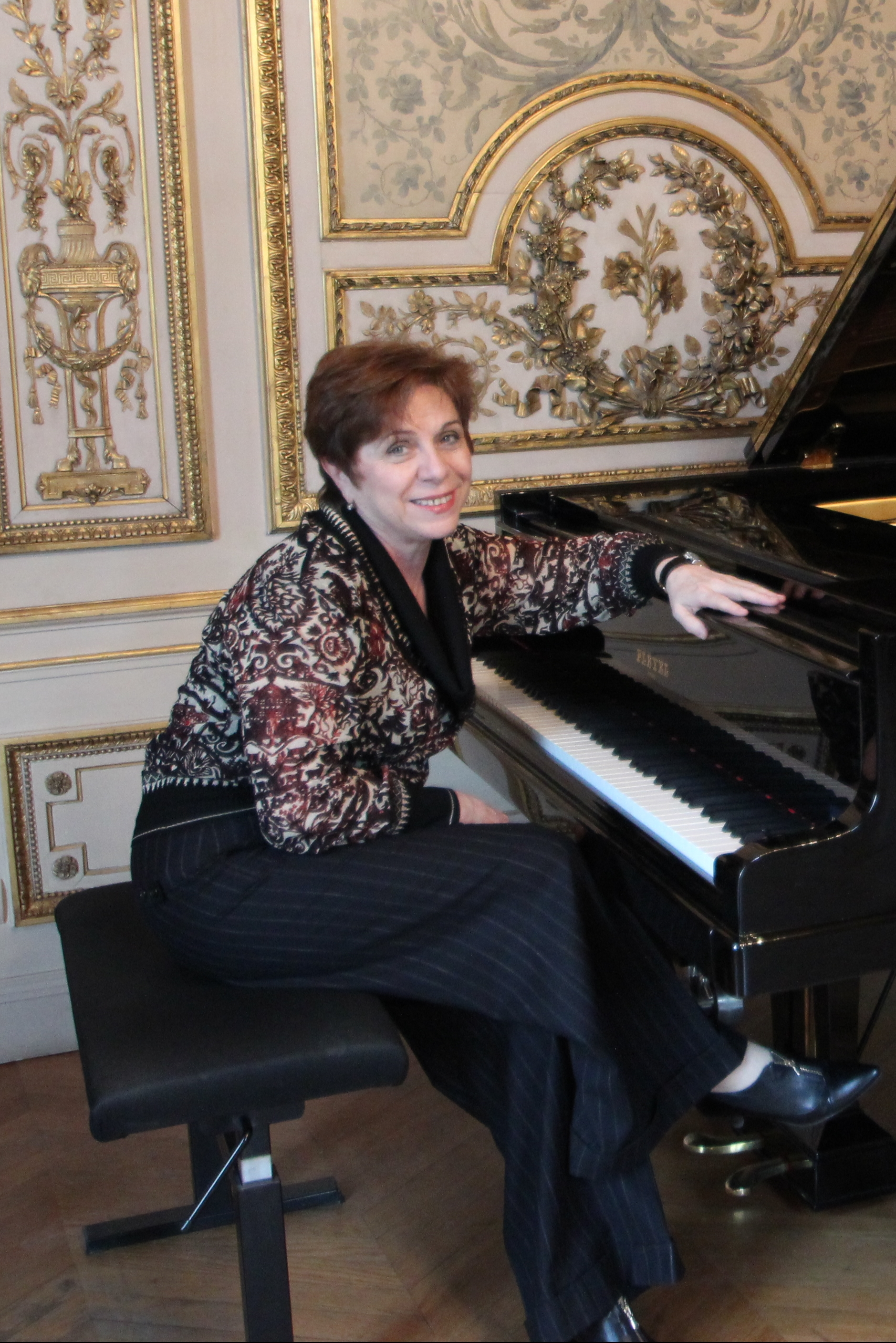
Rena Shereshevskaya, who trained Kantorow for the Tchaikovsky Competition.

In 2019, Kantorow won the first prize, gold medal, and Grand Prix at the 16th Tchaikovsky Competition, becoming the first French winner in the history of the competition. He was the only finalist in the competition to play the Tchaikovsky Piano Concerto No. 2 in G major, and also performed Brahms' Piano Concerto No. 2 in B-flat major.

In 2023 Kantorow won the prestigious $300,000 Gilmore Artist Award. Gilmore Award is not a competition, so Kantorow was unaware that he was considered for it, and when he received the news described it as "It was a bit like a 'You're a wizard, Harry,' kind of moment, from Harry Potter." The award's jury members were "impressed by his charisma, curiosity and 'inquisitive nature'". Zachary Woolfe noted that to win both the Tchaikovsky Competition and Gilmore Award "suggests Kantorow has technical security as well as something to say".

On 26 July 2024 he performed Maurice Ravel's "Jeux d’Eau" during the 2024 Summer Olympics opening ceremony under the "pouring rain"; his performance was described as "heroic and unflappable".

In 2024, he was made a Chevalier of the National Order of Merit, and before that a Chevalier of the Order of Arts and Letters.

In 2025, Kantorow played Sergei Prokofiev’s Third Piano Concerto and Franz Liszt's transcription of the “Liebestod” from Richard Wagner’s Tristan und Isolde.

Kantorow's 2024 "Brahms-Schubert" received the Gramophone's Piano Award 2025.

== Style ==
In 2019, Kantorow was described as a "pale young man with cat-like eyes and long, diaphanous fingers". The Gramophone called him a "fire-breathing virtuoso with a poetic charm" and the Fanfare called him a "Liszt reincarnated".

In the 2025 article for The New York Times, Hugh Morris described Kantorow as "a pianist from a different era", and notes that Kantorow feels "uncomfortable performing Bach in public". Morris also notes that after prestigious awards, Kantorow did not change: "he remains with the same general manager and piano teacher he has had since he was 16. Rather than signing with a major label, he remained with Bis, the small, committed Swedish label that became part of the Apple-owned Platoon in 2023".

== Discography ==
Kantorow's first recording was an album of French sonatas recorded together with his father in 2014. In 2015, his father conducted at Alexandre's recording of Liszt's concertos.

Title	Year	Compositions	Label	Duration	Refs.
Sonates françaises (with Jean-Jacques Kantorow, violin)	2014	Chevillard: Sonata in G minor, Op. 8; Fauré: Violin Sonata No. 1 in A major, Op. 13; Gédalge: Sonata No. 1 in G major, Op. 12	NoMadMusic (NMM0001)	1:09:00	
Liszt: Piano Concertos – Malédiction	2015	Liszt: Piano Concerto No. 1 in E-flat major, S.124; Malédiction, S.121 Op. 452; Piano Concerto No. 2 in A major, S.125	BIS (BIS-2100)	0:57:00	
À la russe	2017	Rachmaninov: Piano Sonata No. 1 in D minor, Op. 28; Stravinsky: The Firebird Suite (1919 Version) (arr. for piano by Guido Agosti); Tchaikovsky: Pieces (2) for piano, Op. 1; Balakirev: Islamey - Oriental Fantasy	BIS (BIS-2150)	1:16:00	
Saint-Saëns: Piano Concertos 3, 4 & 5 “L’Égyptien”	2019	Saint-Saëns: Piano Concertos Nos. 3, 4, 5	BIS (BIS-2300)	1:20:37	
Brahms, Bartók, Liszt	2020	Brahms: Rhapsody in B minor, Op. 79/1; Piano Sonata No. 2 in F♯ minor, Op. 2; Bartók: Rhapsody, Op. 1; Liszt: Hungarian Rhapsody No. 11	BIS (BIS-2380)	1:06:25	
Johannes Brahms: Piano Sonata No. 3, Chaconne & Four Ballades	2021	Brahms: Ballades (4), Op. 10; Piano Sonata No. 3 in F minor, Op. 5; Studies (5), Anh.1a / 1: Chaconne von JS Bach	BIS (BIS-2600)	1:25:00	
Saint-Saëns: Piano Concertos 1 & 2 • Africa • Wedding Cake • Allegro appassionato • Rhapsodie d’Auvergne (with Tapiola Sinfonietta, Jean-Jacques Kantorow)	2022	Saint-Saëns: Piano Concerto No. 2 in G minor, Op. 22; Wedding Cake, Op. 76; Allegro appassionato, Op. 70; Piano Concerto No. 1 in D, Op. 17; Rhapsodie d’Auvergne, Op. 73; Africa, Op. 89	BIS (BIS-2400)	1:24:58	
Brahms • Schubert	2024	Brahms: Piano Sonata No. 1 in C major, Op. 1; Liszt: Der Wanderer, S. 558 / 11 (After Schubert, D. 489); Der Müller und der Bach, S. 565 / 2 (After Schubert, D. 795 / 19); Frühlingsglaube, S. 558 / 7 (After Schubert, D. 686); Die Stadt, S. 560 / 1 (After Schubert, D. 957 / 11); Am Meer, S. 560 / 4 (After Schubert, D. 957 / 12); Schubert: Fantasy in C Major, "Wanderer Fantasy", D 760	BIS (BIS-2660)	1:12:00	
Momentum 2: Korngold, Strauss (with Liya Petrova; Royal Philharmonic; Duncan Ward)	2025	Korngold: Violin Concerto in D, Op. 35; Strauss: Violin Sonata in E-flat, Op. 18	Mirare (MIR690)	0:55:00	
