= Kullak =

Kullak is a surname. Notable people with the surname include:

- Adolph Kullak (1823–1862), German pianist and music writer
- Franz Kullak (1844–1913), German pianist and composer
- Theodor Kullak (1818–1882), German pianist, composer, and teacher
