= François-René Duchâble =

French pianist

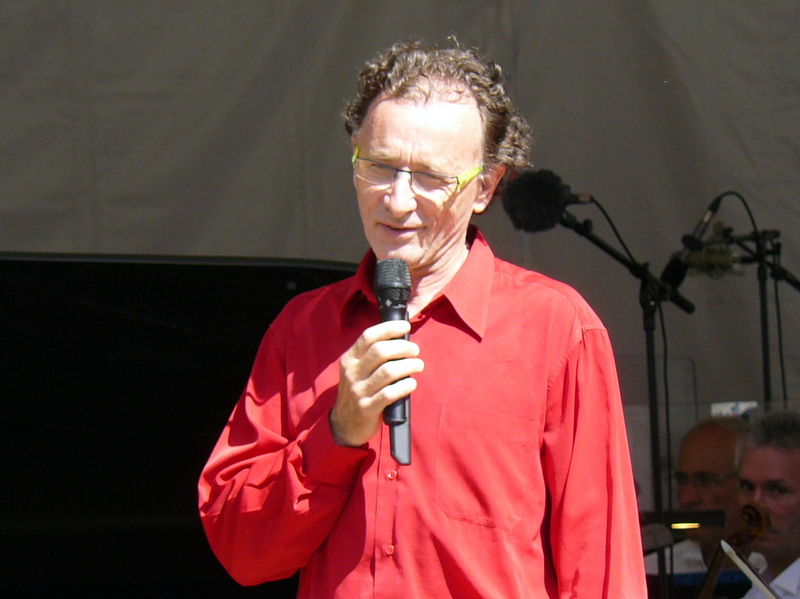

François-René Duchâble (born 22 April 1952, in Paris) is a French pianist. He studied at the Conservatoire de Paris, and at the age of 13 won the institution's first prize in piano. Three years later, he placed 11th at the Queen Elisabeth Music Competition in Brussels, and in 1973 won the Prix de la Fondation Sacha Schneider. At that time, Duchâble caught the attention of Arthur Rubinstein, who encouraged him to pursue a solo career and helped secure his first important engagements. Since then, Duchâble has had a successful concert career in Europe, the United States, Canada, and Japan.

Duchâble has had in his repertoire the concertos of Beethoven, Brahms, Schumann, Bartók, Saint-Saëns and Ravel, and solo piano works of Liszt, Chopin, and Poulenc. He has appeared at many music festivals, including those of Salzburg, Lucerne, Berlin, the London Proms, Lockenhaus, and the Flanders Festival, and has presented concerts at London's Royal Festival Hall, the Philharmonie in Berlin, and the Musikverein in Vienna. As an orchestral soloist, Duchâble has performed with the London Philharmonic, the Berlin Philharmonic, the Rotterdam Philharmonic, the Orchestre de Paris, the Orchestre de la Suisse Romande, and the Montreal Symphony. Among his musical collaborators was Micheline Ostermeyer.

In 2003, Duchâble stated that he would end his classical recital career, in protest at what he saw as the elitism of the classical music system. He had planned three concerts where in two of them, he would destroy two grand pianos, and in one, he would burn his formal concert dress. He said that he would instead tour with an electronic keyboard around France to give informal concerts.

Duchâble was the classical music technical advisor for the Danièle Thompson film Fauteuils d'orchestre (2006), and performed the solo piano works for the soundtrack. The fictional character of "Jean-François Lefort" in this film incorporates elements of Duchâble's own expressed attitudes towards the classical music world.
