= Frédéric Vaysse-Knitter =

French pianist

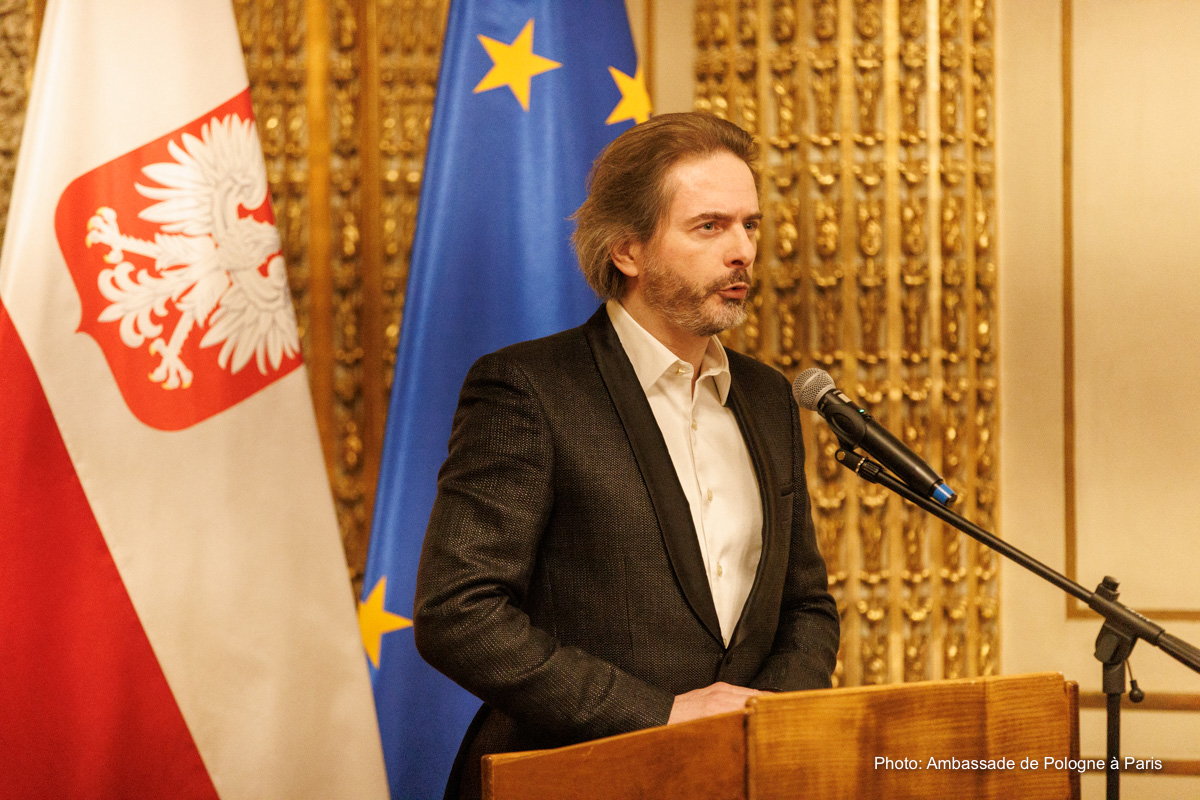
- Frédéric Vaysse-Knitter (2024)
- Born: 1975 (age 50–51)
- Education: Conservatoire de musique, danse et art dramatique en France
- Occupation: Pianist
- Website: fredericvaysseknitter.com

Frédéric Vaysse-Knitter (born in 1975 in Albi) is a French classical pianist of Polish origin.

He entered the Conservatoire de Paris at the age of thirteen where he followed the teachings of Ventsislav Yankov and Michel Béroff.

Vaysse-Knitter distinguished himself in 2006 at the Paris Opéra in John Neumeier's La Dame aux Camélias.

His last recording, the record-book Monsieur Satie, l’homme qui avait un petit piano dans la tête, text by Carl Norac, read by François Morel and illustrated by Élodie Nouhen was rewarded with a Grand Prix of the Académie Charles-Cros in 2006.

== Discography ==
- 1996 : Chopin-Liszt, Polskie Nagrania
- 2004 : Joseph Haydn sonates, Polskie Nagrania
- 2006 : Monsieur Satie, l’homme qui avait un petit piano dans la tête, with François Morel (actor), Elodie Nouhen (illustrations) sur le texte de Carl Norac, Didier Jeunesse
- 2010 : Brahms-Dvorak trios, with Virginie Robilliard (violin) and Peter Szabo (cello), Hungaroton classic
- 2011 : Frédéric Vaysse-Knitter plays Szymanowski, Intégral Classic
- 2014 : Szymanowski- Stravinsky, with Solenne Païdassi (violin), Aparté
- 2016 : Un flot antique de lumière, with Gionata Sgambaro (flute), Klarthe
