= Tapiola Sinfonietta =

The Tapiola Sinfonietta (founded in 1987) is a city orchestra in Espoo, Finland. The orchestra consists of 41 members, and its principal concert venue is Tapiola Hall (with 773 seats) at the Espoo Cultural Centre.

In the beginning, Jorma Panula, Osmo Vänskä, Juhani Lamminmäki, and Jean-Jacques Kantorow (the honorary conductor) served as principal conductors. Nowadays, the orchestra does not have a principal conductor. Instead, they have an artistic board consisting of the general manager and two musicians elected by the orchestra.

Tapiola Sinfonietta records and tours regularly and currently has more than 60 titles.

== Selected recordings ==
- Kalmuk (Westpark) with Kimmo Pohjonen 2002
- Nicolas Bacri : Sturm und Drang, conducted by Jean-Jacques Kantorow, BIS 2009
- Carl Maria von Weber : Symphonies, Works for Bassoon & Orchestra, conducted by Jean-Jacques Kantorow, BIS 2009
- Ludwig van Beethoven : Complete Piano Concertos Olli Mustonen, piano and conductor, Ondine 2020
- Camille Saint-Saëns : Complete Piano concertos, Rhapsodie d’Auvergne, Africa, Wedding Cake, Allegro appassionato, Alexandre Kantorow, piano, conducted by Jean-Jacques Kantorow. 2 SACD BIS 2021/2022. Diapason d’or

== See also ==
- Tapiola Choir
