= Jeanne-Marie Darré =

French classical pianist (1905–1999)

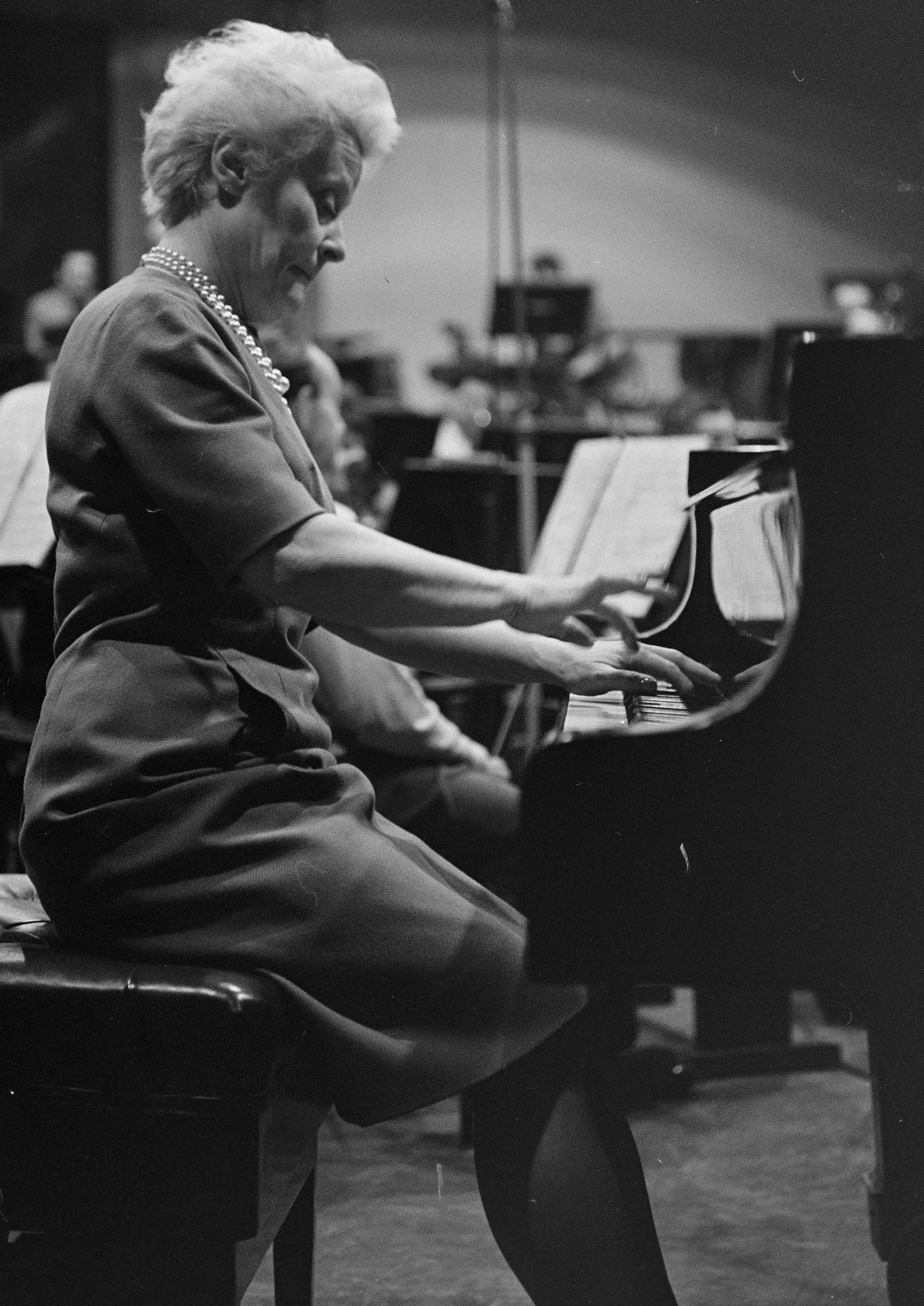

Jeanne-Marie Darré (30 July 1905 – 26 January 1999) was a French classical pianist. She was known for her lyrical and elegant interpretations of the solo works of Chopin and Liszt, and of the Saint-Saëns Concertos. She was awarded the Légion d'honneur and made a Chevalier des Arts et Lettres.

== Biography ==
Darré was born in Givet, France, in 1905. She studied at the Paris Conservatoire with Isidor Philipp and Marguerite Long, and worked with Fauré, Saint-Saëns and Ravel among others.

She made her debut at the age of 14 and her first recordings at 16. When she was 21, she played all five of the Saint-Saëns Piano Concertos in a single concert with the Concerts Lamoureux orchestra, conducted by Paul Paray. She also recorded seven piano rolls for the Duo-Art system in the mid 1920s. She at first pursued her career in Europe, only performing in the United States for the first time in February 1962 at Carnegie Hall with Charles Munch and the Boston Symphony Orchestra, and returning regularly until she retired from concert performance in the 1980s.

Jeanne-Marie Darre 1971, photo dedicated on first of her two acclaimed Southern Africa tours organised by Hans Adler.

She was a professor in the Paris Conservatoire from 1958 to 1975, was awarded the Légion d'honneur and was made a Chevalier des Arts et des Lettres.

She died in 1999, aged 93, in Port Marly, France.
