= Jean-Jacques Kantorow =

French violinist and conductor (born 1945)

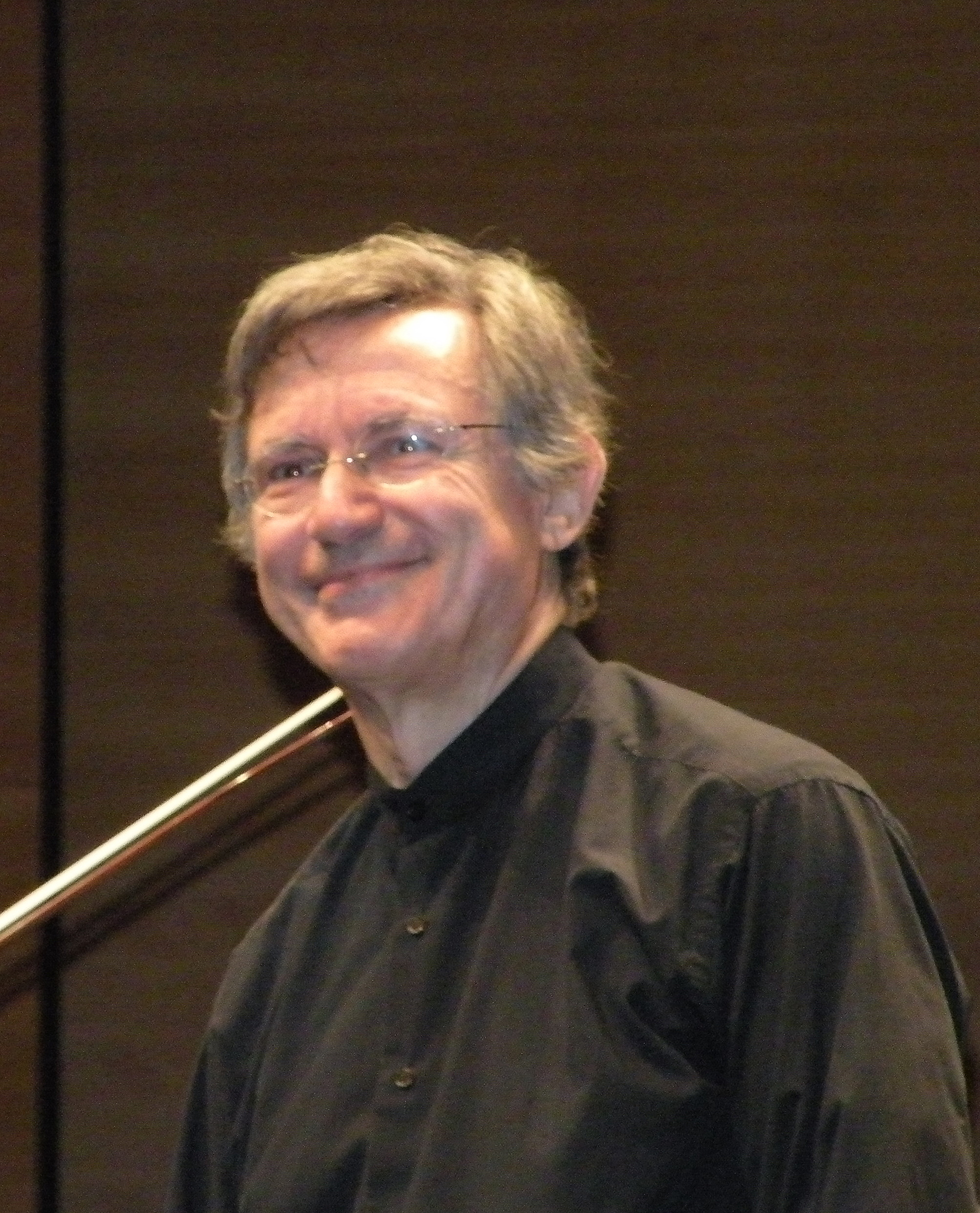
- Kantorow in 2009
- Born: 3 October 1945 (age 81); Cannes, France
- Education: Paris Conservatoire
- Occupations: Violinist and conductor
- Children: Alexandre Kantorow (son)
- Awards: Carl Flesch Competition (London); the (Genoa) Paganini Competition; the Geneva International Competition

Jean-Jacques Kantorow (born 3 October 1945) is a French violinist and conductor.

His son is the pianist Alexandre Kantorow.

== Biography ==
Kantorow was born in Cannes, France, into a family of Russian-Jewish origin. From the age of 13, he studied at the Paris Conservatoire with René Benedetti, and in 1960 won the first violin prize. In the 1960s, he won ten major international prizes, including first prizes in the Carl Flesch Competition (London), the (Genoa) Paganini Competition, and the Geneva International Competition. Since the 1970s, he has been noted for his solo performances in a very wide range of repertoire (from Baroque music to contemporary), and as a chamber music performer. His recordings have won many awards, including the Grand Prix du Disque and the Grand Prix de l'Académie Franz Liszt. He held senior positions at the Strasbourg and Rotterdam conservatories and at the Conservatoire de Paris, until his retirement from conservatoire violin pedagogy. He continues to teach privately and to give master-classes.

According to Grove Music Online, "Kantorow has an infallible technique and a beauty of tone which combines the best features of the French and Russian schools." He plays a Stradivarius attributed violin, the "ex-Leopold Auer", dated 1699.

In the 1980s, Kantorow began a separate career as conductor, becoming principal conductor of the Auvergne Chamber Orchestra and later the Ensemble Orchestral de Paris. He has longstanding conducting engagements with other European orchestras, including the Netherlands Chamber Orchestra, the Tapiola Sinfonietta of Finland, the Helsinki Chamber Orchestra, and the Lausanne Chamber Orchestra. From 2004 to 2008, he was principal director of the Orquesta Ciudad de Granada in Spain.

In 2019, his son Alexandre Kantorow won the First Prize and Gold Medal at the International Tchaikovsky Competition piano category.

== Selected recordings ==
- Camille Saint-Sëns, Symphony in A major, Symphony n° 1 in E flat major op.2, Symphony n °2 in A minor op.55, Organ Symphony n°3 in C minor op.78, Symphony "Urbs Roma" in F, Thierry Escaich, organ, Orchestre Philharmonique Royal de Liège conducted by Jean-Jacques Kantorow. 2 SACD Bis 2021. Diapason d’or
