= Gabriel Tacchino =

French pianist (1934–2023)

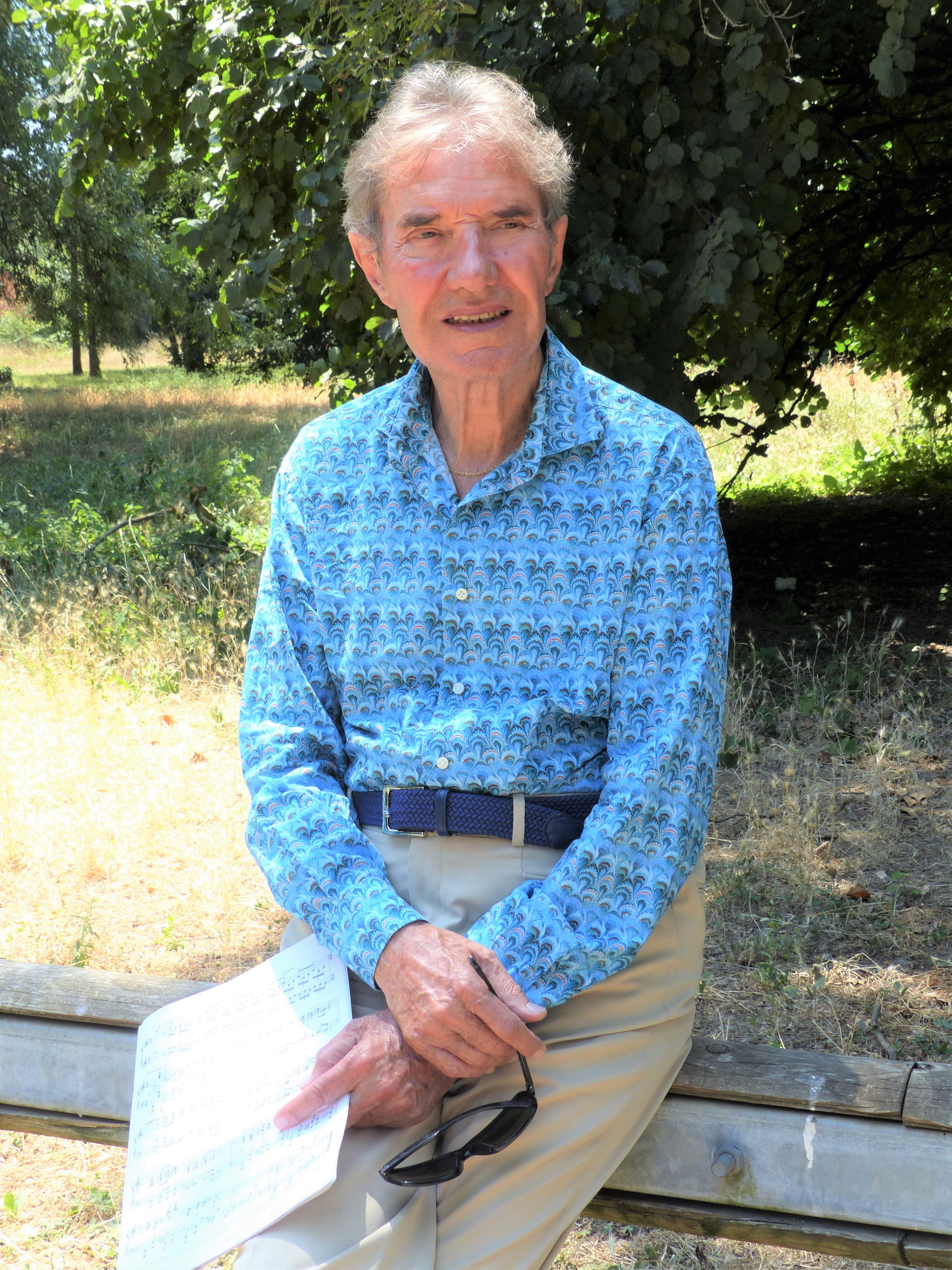
Tacchino in 2018

Gabriel Tacchino (French pronunciation: [ɡabʁijɛl takino]; 4 August 1934 – 29 January 2023) was a French classical pianist and teacher.

== Life and career ==
Tacchino was born in Cannes on 4 August 1934. He studied at the Paris Conservatoire from 1947 to 1953, where his teachers included Jacques Février and Marguerite Long. He also studied with Francis Poulenc, the only pianist ever to do so; consequently, his interpretation of Poulenc's piano music reveals a special insight into the composer's intentions.

His early prizes included the Viotti Competition (1st prize, 1953); the Busoni Competition (1954, 2nd prize); Casella International Competition (1954; 1st prize); the Geneva Competition (1955; joint 2nd prize with Malcolm Frager); and the Marguerite Long-Jacques Thibaud Competition (1957, 4th prize).

Herbert von Karajan was instrumental in Tacchino getting his break, by engaging him to play with various orchestras including the Berlin Philharmonic. His United States debut was in 1962, with Erich Leinsdorf and the Boston Symphony Orchestra. He performed under conductors such as Pierre Monteux, André Cluytens, Jascha Horenstein, Riccardo Muti, Kent Nagano, and many others. Other orchestras with which he played include the London Symphony Orchestra, Philharmonia Orchestra, Orchestre de la Suisse Romande, English Chamber Orchestra, Orchestre de Paris, Orchestre National de France, Montreal Symphony Orchestra and many others. He was also a regular solo performer on the concert platform and also held master classes.

Tacchino also played chamber music with notables such as Isaac Stern, Jean-Pierre Rampal, Pierre Amoyal, Maxence Larrieu, and others.

His recordings included the complete music for piano by Poulenc, which was reissued by EMI on five CDs in 2005; the complete piano concertos (five each) by Saint-Saëns and Prokofiev for Vox; and works by J. S. Bach, Mozart, Chopin, Franck, Grieg, Debussy, Satie, Ravel, Gershwin, Addinsell, and others for recording labels such as Erato Records and Pierre Verany.

Having taught at his alma mater the Paris Conservatoire 1975–1994, he later taught at the University of Fine Arts and Music (Geidai) in Tokyo, the Mozarteum University in Salzburg, Académie internationale d'été de Nice, and at the Schola Cantorum in Paris.

David Dubal wrote of Tacchino: "A splendid pianist. His playing is buoyant and well planned."

Tacchino died on 29 January 2023, at the age of 88.
