= La Trompette (musical society) =

La Trompette was a chamber music society based in Paris, founded by Émile Lemoine in January 1861. It has been credited with a major role in the propagation of chamber music in France. Performers included Camille Saint-Saëns, Louis Diémer, Paul Taffanel, Felix Weingartner, Pablo Casals, Harold Bauer, Wanda Landowska, Alfred Cortot, and Serge Koussevitzky.

== History ==
The society was founded in 1861 by Lemoine and three École Polytechnique fellow students who enjoyed playing quartets. The name "La Trompette" stemmed from a "non-sympathetic remark a teacher once made to quiet the quartet". With increasing popularity, it became a weekly private concert series. In 1878, the society moved to the hall of the Horticultural Society at 84 Rue de Grenelle, which seated 850.

Lemoine kept the nature of the society informal, considering himself not a manager or director but a host, and members of the society not to be subscribers but his friends, even though an annual monetary contribution was requested from each guest.

The concerts were invitation-only. Lemoine considered the audiences "very musical and ultra-select, with distinction and intellectual value but without snobbery". They began in the late evening, often with a quartet, and were held late December to early May. Most concerts combined a variety of styles, periods, and genres.

After Lemoine died in 1913, his wife continued the society.

== Saint-Saëns ==
Camille Saint-Saëns, a friend of Lemoine, was a longtime associate of La Trompette. He wrote his Septet specifically for the society, after Lemoine had "pestered" him years for a special piece to justify the name of the society.

Compositions by Saint-Saëns that were premiered at La Trompette include:

- Septet, Op. 65 (28 December 1880)
- Violin Sonata No. 1, Op. 75 (9 January 1886)
- Barcarolle, Op. 108 (18 May 1898)
