= Clarinet Sonata (Saint-Saëns) =

Sonata written by Camille Saint-Saëns

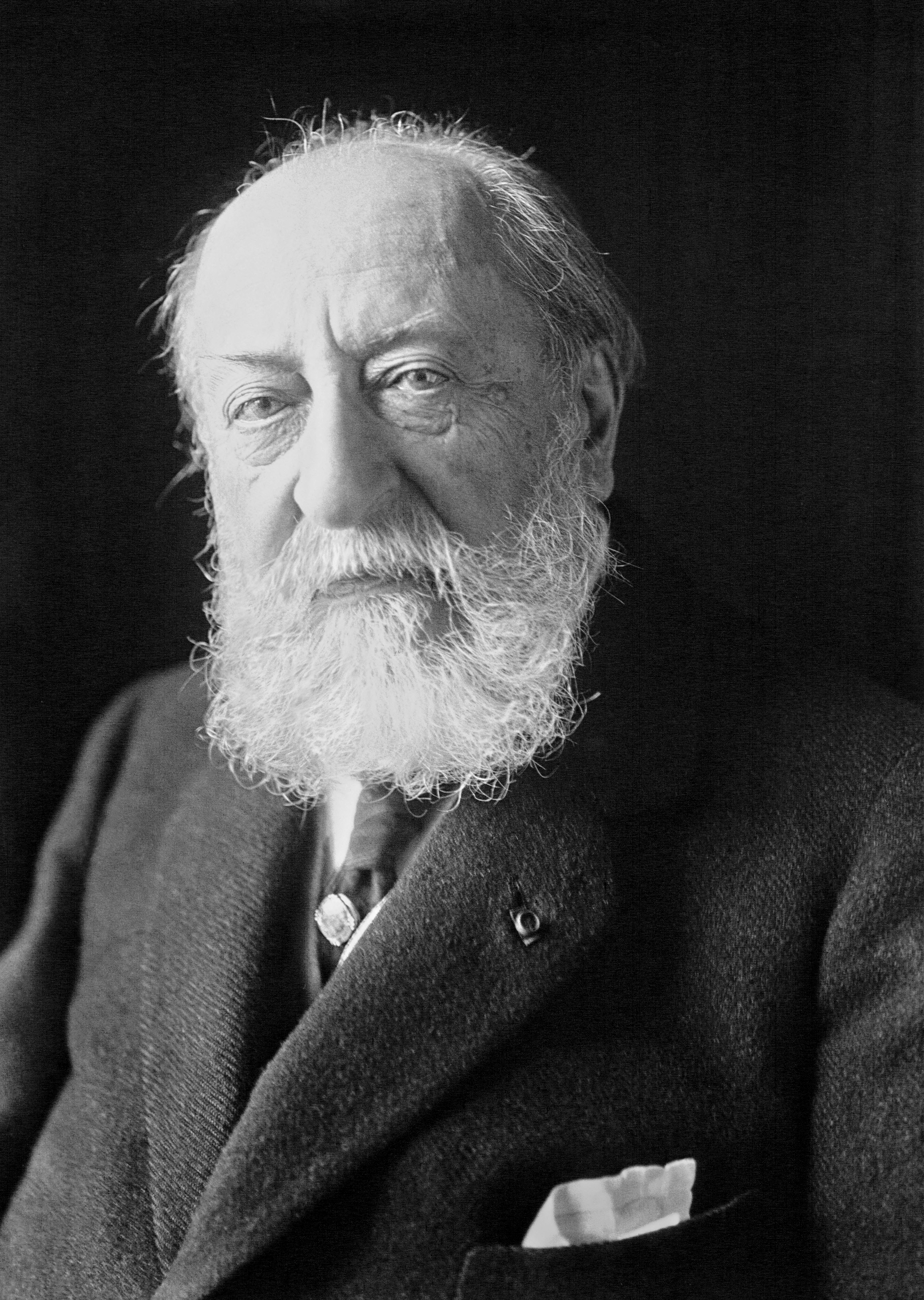
Camille Saint-Saens in 1921

The Clarinet Sonata in E♭ major, Op. 167, was written by Camille Saint-Saëns in 1921 as one of his last works. This clarinet sonata is the second of the three sonatas that Saint-Saëns composed for wind instruments, the other two being the Oboe Sonata (Op. 166) and the Bassoon Sonata (Op. 168), written the same year. These works were part of Saint-Saëns's efforts to expand the repertoire for instruments for which hardly any solo parts were written, as he confided to his friend Jean Chantavoine in a letter dated to 15 April 1921: "At the moment I am concentrating my last reserves on giving rarely considered instruments the chance to be heard."

Saint-Saëns dedicated the work to Auguste Périer, a professor at the Conservatoire de Paris.

== Structure ==
External audio
- Performed by Richard Stoltzman and Irma Vallecillo
- I. Allegretto
- II. Allegro animato
- III. Lento
- IV. Molto allegro

The work consists of four movements. A performance takes approximately 16 minutes.

1. Allegretto (E♭ major, 12/8)
2. Allegro animato (A♭ major, 2/2)
3. Lento (E♭ minor, 3/2)
4. Molto allegro (E♭ major, 4/4)

The theme of the first movement is reprised at the end of the fourth movement.

== Reception ==
For the musical scholar Jean Gallois, the Clarinet Sonata is the most important of the three wind sonatas: he calls it "a masterpiece full of impishness, elegance and discreet lyricism" amounting to "a summary of the rest". The work contrasts a "doleful threnody" in the slow movement with the finale, which "pirouettes in 4/4 time", in a style reminiscent of the 18th century.

Today the sonata is part of the standard repertoire of the clarinet.
