= Oboe Sonata (Saint-Saëns) =

Sonata written by Camille Saint-Saëns

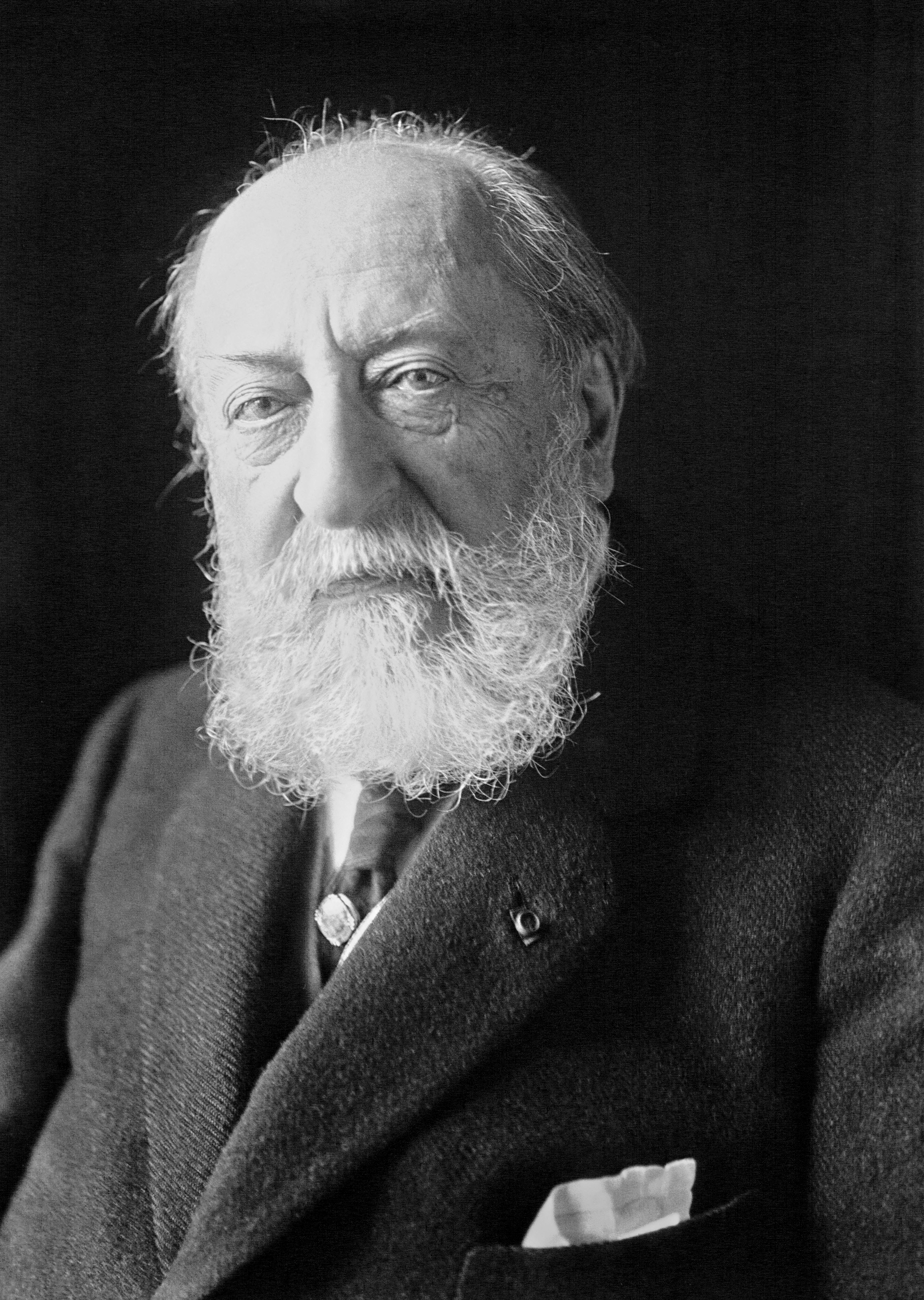
Camille Saint-Saens in 1921

Camille Saint-Saëns's Oboe Sonata in D major, Op. 166 was composed in 1921, the year of the composer's death.

This sonata is the first of the three sonatas that Saint-Saëns composed for wind instruments, the other two being the Clarinet Sonata (Op. 167) and the Bassoon Sonata (Op. 168), written the same year. These works were part of Saint-Saëns's efforts to expand the repertoire for instruments for which hardly any solo parts were written, as he confided to his friend Jean Chantavoine in a letter dated to 15 April 1921: "At the moment I am concentrating my last reserves on giving rarely considered instruments the chance to be heard."

The piece is dedicated to Louis Bas, first solo oboe with the Societé du Conservatoire de l'Opéra.

== Structure ==
It is written in three movements:

1. Andantino in D major
2. Ad libitum – Allegretto – Ad libitum in B♭ major
3. Molto allegro in D minor – D major

The movements are not ordered according to the traditional fast-slow-fast sonata system. The tempo of the movements increases successively.

The first movement, Andantino, is music of a pastoral kind, in ternary form ABA. The opening theme of the oboe solo is an echo of the Westminster Quarters.

The core of the second movement is a Romance, marked Allegretto. It is preceded by an introduction and followed by an epilogue. The introduction and epilogue are marked ad libitum - that is, the performer is free to choose the tempo considered most appropriate.

The last movement, titled Molto allegro, short and brilliant, has passages of great difficulty and virtuosity.
