= Bassoon Sonata (Saint-Saëns) =

Sonata written by Camille Saint-Saëns (1921)

- by Camille Saint-Saëns
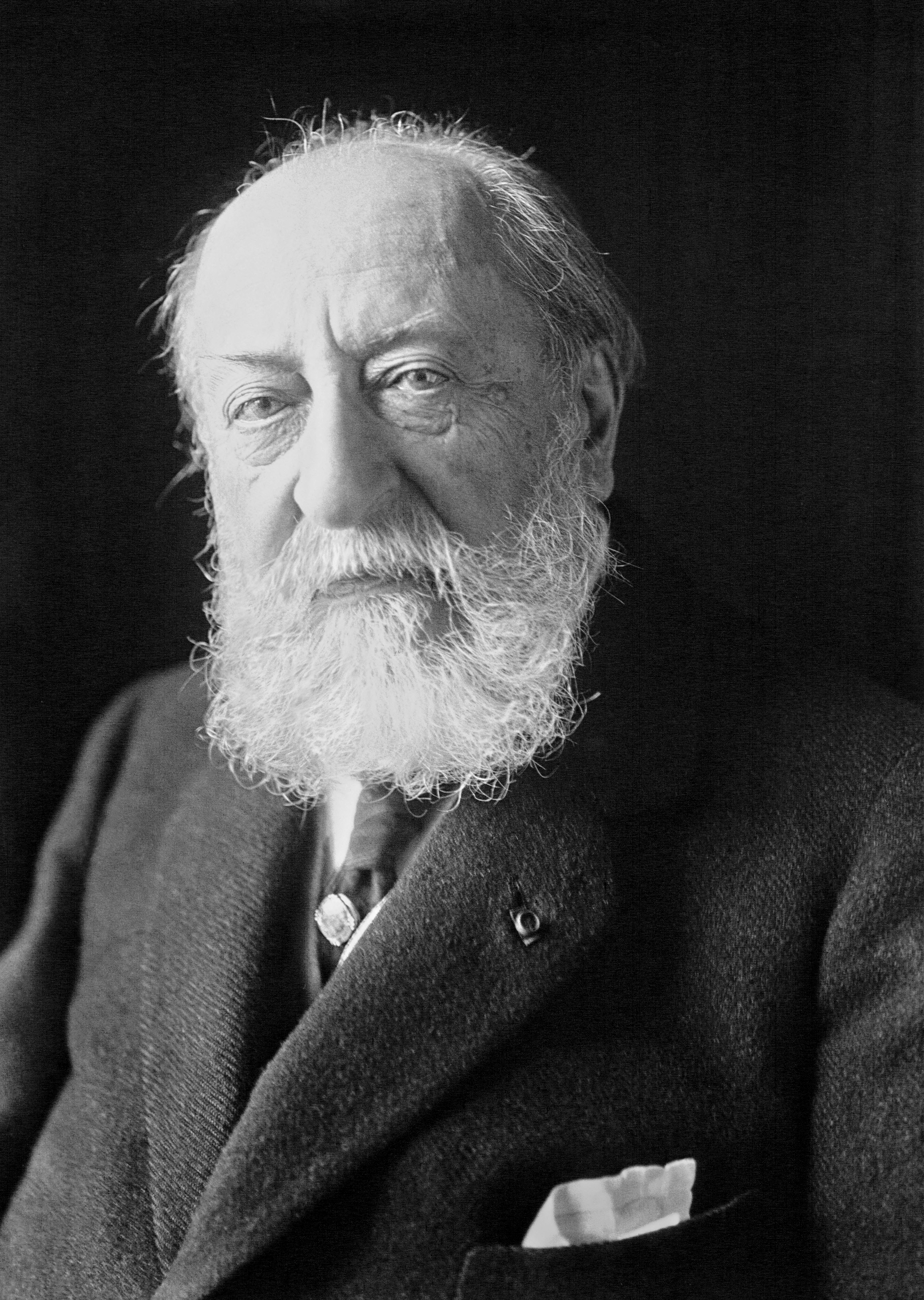
- Saint-Saëns in 1921
- Key: G major
- Opus: 168
- Composed: 1921
- Duration: approximately 13 minutes
- Movements: three
- Scoring: Bassoon and piano

The Bassoon Sonata in G major, Op. 168, was written by Camille Saint-Saëns in 1921 as one of his last works.

This bassoon sonata is the last of the three sonatas that Saint-Saëns composed for wind instruments, the other two being the Oboe Sonata (Op. 166) and the Clarinet Sonata (Op. 167), written the same year. These works were part of Saint-Saëns's efforts to expand the repertoire for instruments for which hardly any solo parts were written, as he confided to his friend Jean Chantavoine in a letter dated to 15 April 1921: "At the moment I am concentrating my last reserves on giving rarely considered instruments the chance to be heard."

== Structure ==
Bassoon Sonata
Performed by Arthur Grossman, bassoon and Joseph Levine, piano

The work consists of three movements:

1. Allegro moderato
2. Allegro scherzando
3. Molto adagio – Allegro moderato

A performance takes approximately 13 minutes.

== Reception ==
The musical scholar Jean Gallois calls the Bassoon Sonata "a model of transparency, vitality and lightness", containing humorous touches but also moments of peaceful contemplation.
