= Barcarolle =

Musical form

A barcarolle (/ˈbɑːrkəroʊl/ BAR-kə-rohl; from French, also barcarole; originally, Italian barcarola or barcaruola, from barca 'boat') is a traditional folk song sung by Venetian gondoliers, or a piece of music composed in that style. In classical music, two of the most famous barcarolles are Jacques Offenbach's "Belle nuit, ô nuit d'amour", from his opera The Tales of Hoffmann; and Frédéric Chopin's Barcarolle in F-sharp major for solo piano.

== Description ==
A barcarolle is characterized by a rhythm reminiscent of the gondolier's stroke, almost invariably in 6/8 metre at a moderate tempo.

While the most-famous barcarolles are from the Romantic period, the genre was known well enough in the 18th century for Burney to mention, in The Present State of Music in France and Italy (1771), that it was a celebrated form cherished by "collectors of good taste".

== Notable examples ==
Mikhail Glinka's "Barcarolle in G major", from Four Musical Essays (1847)
Performed by Adam Cuerden

The barcarolle was a popular form in opera, where the apparently artless sentimental style of the folklike song could be put to good use. In addition to the Offenbach example: Paisiello, Weber, and Rossini wrote arias that were barcarolles; Donizetti set the Venetian scene at the opening of Marino Faliero (1835) with a barcarolle for a gondolier and chorus; and Verdi included a barcarolle in Un ballo in maschera (i.e., Richard's atmospheric "Di’ tu se fidele il flutto m’aspetta" in Act I). The traditional Neapolitan barcarolle "Santa Lucia" was published in 1849. The 32nd Sultan of the Ottoman Empire, Sultan Abdulaziz (1830–1876), also composed a barcarolle, entitled "La Gondole Barcarolle".

Arthur Sullivan set the entry of Sir Joseph Porter's barge (also bearing his sisters, cousins and aunts) in H.M.S. Pinafore to a barcarolle, as well as the Trio "My well-loved lord and guardian dear" among Phyllis, Earl Tolloller and the Earl of Mountararat in Act I of Iolanthe. Schubert, while not using the name specifically, used a style reminiscent of the barcarolle in some of his most famous songs, including especially his haunting "Auf dem Wasser zu singen" ("To be sung on the water"), D.774.

Other notable barcarolles include: the second movement of Ludwig van Beethoven’s Piano Sonata in G, Opus 79; the three "Venetian Gondola Songs" from Mendelssohn's Songs Without Words, Opp. 19, 30 and 62; the "June" barcarolle from Tchaikovsky's The Seasons; Charles-Valentin Alkan's Barcarolles from his chants, Opp. 38a, 38b, 65, 67, and 70; Camille Saint-Saëns's Barcarolle for violin, cello, harmonium (or organ) and piano; Béla Bartók's "Barcarolla" from Out of Doors; Barcarolle, Op. 27, no. 1, by Moritz Moszkowski, and several examples by Anton Rubinstein, Mily Balakirev, Alexander Glazunov, Edward MacDowell, Mel Bonis, Ethelbert Nevin; and a series of thirteen for solo piano by Gabriel Fauré.

In the 20th century, further examples include: Agustín Barrios's Julia Florida; the second movement of Villa-Lobos's Trio No. 2 (1915) (which contains a Berceuse-Barcarolla); the first movement of Francis Poulenc's Napoli suite for solo piano (1925); George Gershwin's Dance of the Waves (1937, unpublished); Ned Rorem's three Barcarolles for piano, composed in Morocco (1949); the Barcarolle from Gian-Carlo Menotti's ballet Sebastian; the first movement of Nikolai Myaskovsky's Piano Sonata no. 8, op. 83 (1949); "Hello Young Lovers" from Richard Rodgers' The King and I (1951); "The Kings' Barcarolle" from Leonard Bernstein's Candide (1956); and Juan María Solare's neoclassical Barcarola for piano (recording included in the album Sombras blancas). Dominick Argento's 25-minute choral cycle Walden Pond (1996) is subtitled "Nocturnes and Barcarolles for Mixed Chorus"; the five-movement work makes extensive use of 6/8 meter. The penultimate movement of Arnold Schoenberg's Pierrot lunaire, Heimfahrt, is also labelled a barcarolle. Stephen Sondheim uses a barcarolle for the two princes' song "Agony" from his 1986 musical Into the Woods.

Bob Dylan’s song "I've Made Up My Mind to Give Myself to You" from his 2020 album Rough and Rowdy Ways uses Offenbach’s "Barcarolle" as a riff.
