= Septet in E-flat major =

Septet in E-flat major may refer to:

- Septet (Beethoven)
- Septet (Saint-Saëns)
