= Barcarolle (Saint-Saëns) =

Chamber composition for a quartet by Camille Saint-Saëns

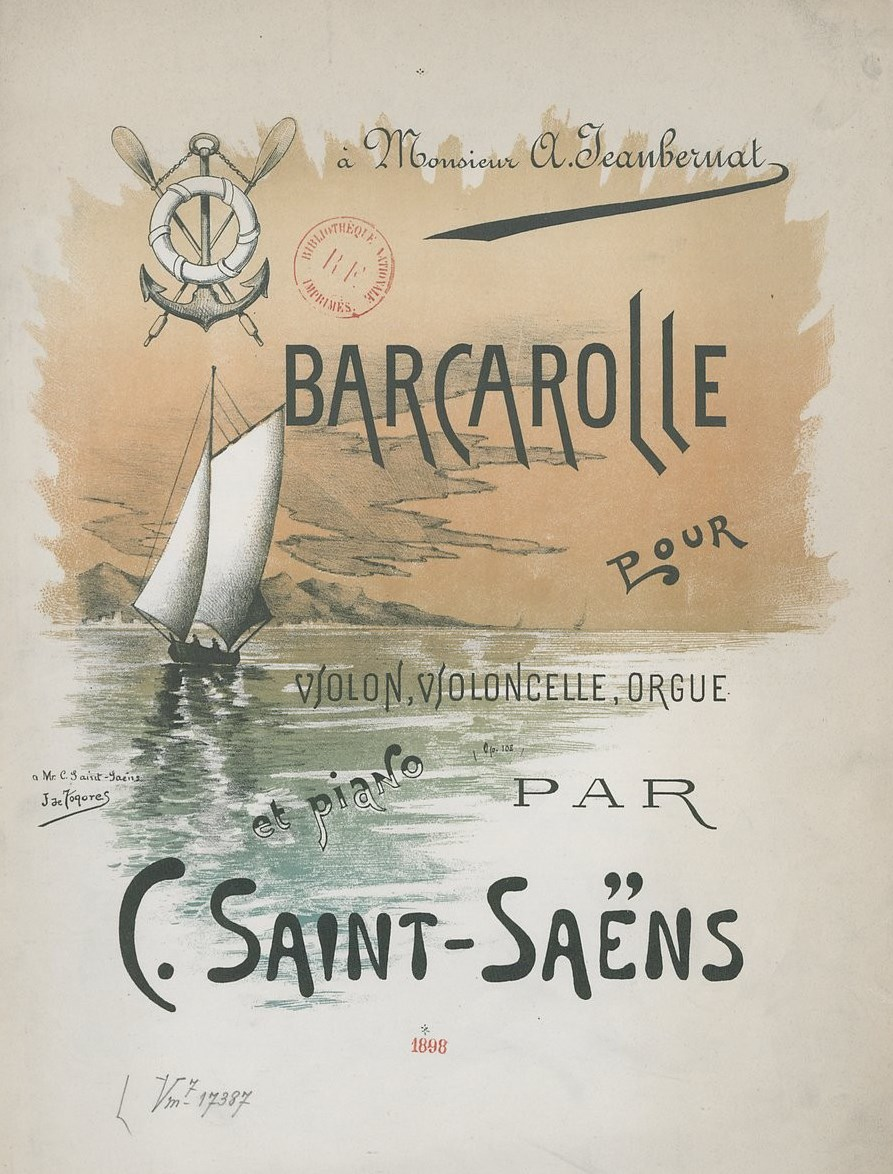
Cover of first edition (1898)

Camille Saint-Saëns's Barcarolle in F major, Op. 108 is a chamber composition for a quartet consisting of violin, cello, harmonium (or organ) and piano. Composed in 1898, the work also exists in a version for violin, cello, viola and piano created by the composer in 1909.

== Background ==
The Barcarolle was Saint-Saëns's second attempt at composing for this combination of instruments, with an 1897 attempt being abandoned after five and a half pages. In 1865 he had composed the Serenade Op. 15 for a similar combination with a viola rather than a cello as the fourth instrument. In the first performance, which took place at the musical society La Trompette on 18 May 1898, the piano was played by Louis Diémer, the violin by Guillaume Rémy, the cello by Jules Delsart, with the composer playing the harmonium.

The work is dedicated to Antonio Jeanbernat, who initiated two festivals of Saint-Saëns' works in Barcelona.

== Structure ==
The composition is structured as a single movement marked Allegretto moderato. Performance time is around 8 to 10 minutes.
