= Léonce Cohen =

French composer

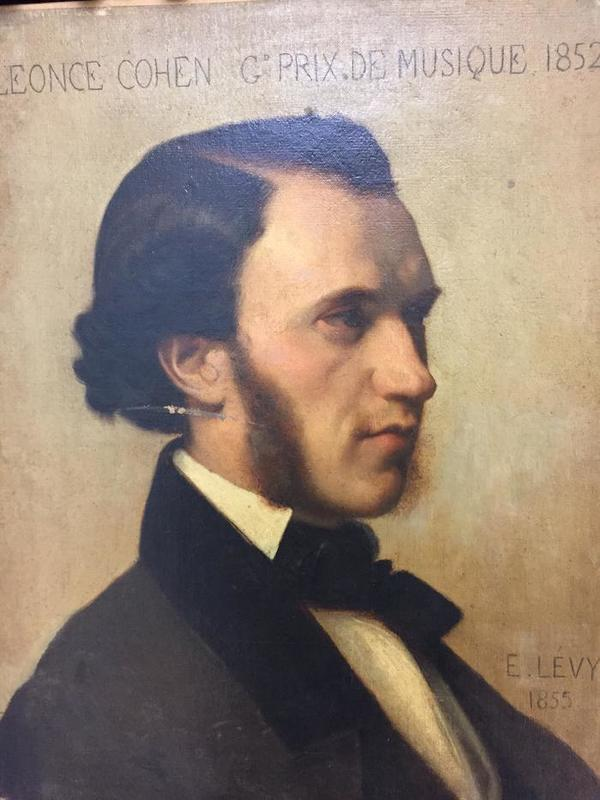

Léonce Cohen (12 February 1829 – 26 February 1901) was a 19th-century French composer.

== Biography ==
Cohen was born in Paris from an Alsatian merchant family. His father inherited a china shop in Paris, rue de Bondy, and later was the first director of the Rothschild Hospital in the 12th arrondissement of Paris. His mother, Merline Weil (1805–1875), was the sister of the writer Godcheaux Weil, known as Ben-Levy, a cousin of Adolphe Crémieux, and the great-aunt of Henri Bergson and Marcel Proust.

Aged thirteen, Cohen began his training at the Conservatoire de Paris where he specialised in the violin. Additionally, he also followed the organ class of François Benoist and studied musical composition with Aimé Leborne. He won the Prix de Rome in 1852 with the cantata Le Retour du Virginie (libretto by Auguste Rollet after Bernardin de Saint-Pierre's Paul et Virginie), beating out Camille Saint-Saëns that year.

During his studies, Cohen was violinist at the Comédie Italienne in Paris. After his stay in Rome he wrote a solemn mass, applauded by Fromental Halévy. On his return to Paris in 1855, he joined the Comédie Italienne but also the Théâtre du Vaudeville as violinist. From 1875, he worked as violist in the Orchestre de la Société des Concerts du Conservatoire.

In 1858, his operetta Mam'zelle Jeanne was created at the Théâtre des Bouffes-Parisiens, followed in 1866 by Bettina. In 1862, he published his École du musicien, ou solfège théorique et pratique, avec accompagnement de piano, which he dedicated to Ambroise Thomas.

He died in Paris.
