= Mussy-sur-Seine =

Commune in Grand Est, France

- Commune
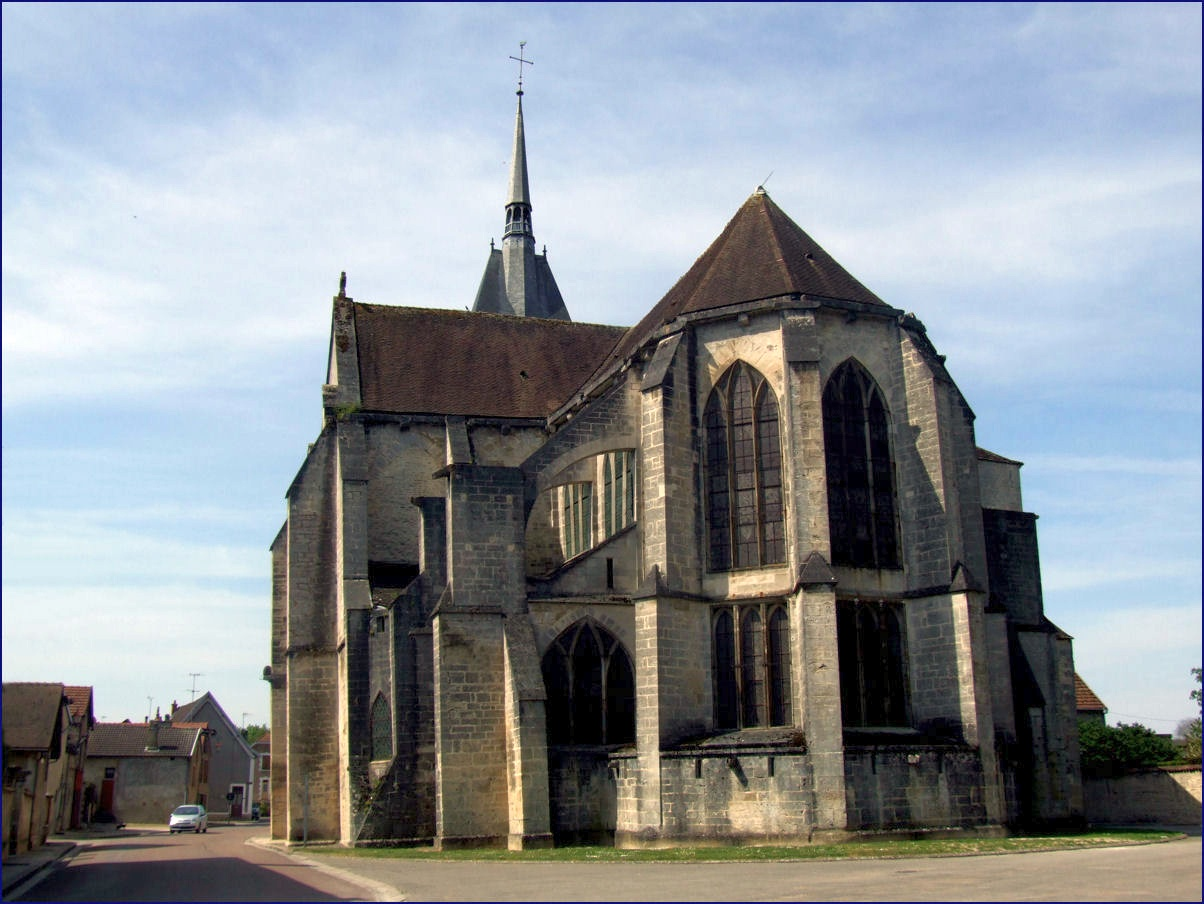
- Saint-Pierre-ès-Liens

- Coat of arms
- Location of Mussy-sur-Seine
- Location within France Location within Grand Est
- Coordinates: 47°58′40″N 4°29′52″E
- Country: France
- Region: Grand Est
- Department: Aube
- Arrondissement: Troyes
- Canton: Bar-sur-Seine

Government
  - Mayor (2020–2026): Henri Petit de Bantel
- Area^{1}: 28.07 km^{2} (10.84 sq mi)
- Elevation: 192 m (630 ft)
- Highest elevation: 339 m (1,112 ft)
- Lowest elevation: 152 m (499 ft)
- Population (2023): 914
  - Density: 32.6/km^{2} (84.3/sq mi)
- Time zone: UTC+01:00 (CET)
  - Summer (DST): UTC+02:00 (CEST)
- INSEE/Postal code: 10261 /10250
- ^{1} French Land Register data, which excludes lakes, ponds, glaciers > 1 km^{2} (0.386 sq mi or 247 acres) and river estuaries.

Mussy-sur-Seine (French pronunciation: [mysi syʁ sɛn], literally Mussy on Seine) is a commune in the Aube department in north-central France.

== Population ==
Historical population
| Year | Pop. | ±% p.a. |
|---|---|---|
| 1968 | 1,429 | — |
| 1975 | 1,682 | +2.36% |
| 1982 | 1,684 | +0.02% |
| 1990 | 1,481 | −1.59% |
| 1999 | 1,277 | −1.63% |
| 2007 | 1,170 | −1.09% |
| 2012 | 1,071 | −1.75% |
| 2017 | 1,019 | −0.99% |
| 2023 | 914 | −1.80% |
Source: INSEE

== See also ==
- Communes of the Aube department
