= Jean Chantavoine =

French musicologist and biographer

- Born: 1877; Paris
- Died: 1952 (aged 74–75); Mussy-sur-Seine
- Occupations: Musicologist, biographer

Jean François Henri Chantavoine (17 May 1877 – 16 July 1952) was a French musicologist and biographer and the secretary-general of the Paris Conservatoire.

Chantavoine was born in Paris. He published numerous books and articles, including biographies of Beethoven, Liszt, Saint-Saëns and Mozart.

In 1933, in an article in the periodical Le Ménestrel, he revealed the existence of Bizet's Symphony in C, the manuscript of which was housed in the library of the Conservatoire. Chantavoine also was the first to publish many of Beethoven's manuscript sketches and letters, for example in his 1903 Correspondance de Beethoven. He died, aged 75, in Mussy-sur-Seine.
