= National Horticultural Society of France =

The National Horticultural Society of France (French: Société nationale d'horticulture de France, or SNHF) is a horticultural society founded in 1827 by Louis-Étienne Héricart de Thury. Headquartered in Paris, it comprises specialized departments which organize conferences, themed journeys and garden visits, and exhibitions.

== History ==
The Société d’Horticulture de Paris was founded on 11 June 1827 on the initiative of Vicomte Héricart de Thury to unite enthusiasts who wanted to exchange ideas and cultivate exotic species. In 1835 the organization received royal recognition and became the Société Royale d’Horticulture. A second, similar organizations was formed, and was named Société Nationale d’Horticulture de la Seine.

Under the presidency of the Duc de Morny the two merged in 1854, taking the name Société Impériale Centrale d’Horticulture, with its headquarters on 84 Rue de Grenelle, in Paris's 7th arrondissement of Paris since 1860; the organization took the current name in 1885.

Since 2001, the SNHF organizes the yearly national competition Concours National des Jardins Potagers rewarding the best private gardens in France.

== Library and holdings ==
The SNHF maintains a library and documentation center which contains over 10,000 documents, including over 7,000 books (the oldest from 1541). In addition, it holds 1,289 periodicals and 400 horticultural catalogs. The book collection includes rare works including a 1541 transcript of Columella's work, Théâtre d'agriculture et mesnage des champs (Olivier de Serres, 1600), Genera Plantarum (Charles Linné, 1737), Principes de la méthode naturelle des végétaux (Antoine Laurent de Jussieu, 1824), and Insectivorous Plants (Charles Darwin, 1875).

The SNHF also publishes a journal, Jardins de France.

Through a partnership with the Bibliothèque nationale de France, 2,000 documents were uploaded and posted on hortalia.org.

== Associated organizations ==
The SNHF unites more than 220 horticultural societies and associations from all over France.
