= List of compositions by Camille Saint-Saëns =

Below is a sortable list of compositions by Camille Saint-Saëns. The works are categorised by genre, opus number, Ratner catalogue number, date of composition and titles. R numbers are from Camille Saint-Saëns 1835–1921: A Thematic Catalogue of His Complete Works by Sabina Teller Ratner (Oxford University Press).

Genre	Opus	R	Date	French title (original title)	English title	Scoring	Notes
Opera	—	289	1864–1865	Le timbre d'argent	The Silver Bell		Drame lyrique in 4 acts; libretto by Jules Barbier and Michel Carré; first performance in 1877
Opera	30	287	1872	La princesse jaune	The Yellow Princess		Opéra comique in 1 act; libretto by Louis Gallet
Opera	47	288	1877	Samson et Dalila	Samson and Dalila		Opera in 3 acts; libretto by Ferdinand Lemaire
Opera	—	290	1879	Étienne Marcel	Étienne Marcel		Opera in 4 acts; libretto by Louis Gallet
Opera	—	291	1881–1882	Henry VIII	Henry VIII		Opera in 4 acts; libretto by Léonce Détroyat and Armand Silvestre
Opera	—	292	1887	Proserpine	Proserpine		Drame lyrique in 4 acts; libretto by Louis Gallet after Auguste Vacquerie
Opera	—	293	1887–1888	Ascanio	Ascanio		Opera in 5 acts; libretto by Louis Gallet after the play Benvenuto Cellini by Paul Meurice
Opera	—	294	1893	Phryné	Phryné		Opéra comique in 2 acts; libretto by Lucien Augé de Lassus
Opera	—		1895	Frédégonde	Frédégonde		Drame lyrique in 5 acts; libretto by Louis Gallet
Opera	—	295	1900–1901	Les barbares			Tragédie lyrique in 3 acts; libretto by Victorien Sardou and Pierre-Barthélemy Gheusi
Opera	—	296	1902–1903	Hélène	Hélène		Poème lyrique in 1 act; libretto by the composer
Opera	—	297	1905	L'ancêtre	L'ancêtre		Drame lyrique in 3 acts; libretto by Lucien Augé de Lassus
Opera	—	298	1909–1910	Déjanire	Déjanire		Drame lyrique in 4 acts; libretto by the composer after the play by Louis Gallet; original version: 1892 incidental music for the play by Gallet
Ballet	—	306	1896	Javotte	Javotte		Ballet in 1 act; libretto by Jean-Louis Croze
Film	128	331	1908	L'assassinat du duc de Guise	The Assassination of the Duke of Guise		produced Paris, Salle Charras, 16 November 1908
Incidental	—		1892	Déjanire	Déjanire		Incidental music for the play by Louis Gallet; revised as an opera in 1911
Incidental	—	317	1893	Antigone	Antigone		Incidental music for the play by Sophocles in French adaptation by Paul Meurice and Auguste Vacquerie
Incidental	—	312	1902	Parysatis	Parysatis		Incidental music for the play by Jane Dieulafoy
Incidental	—	320	1902	Andromaque	Andromaque		Incidental music for the play by Jean Racine
Incidental	130	321	1908	La foi	La foi		Incidental music for the play by Eugène Brieux; also adapted for the concert stage as 3 Symphonic Pictures after "La Foi"
Incidental	—		1917	On ne badine pas avec l'amour			Incidental music for the play by Alfred de Musset
Orchestral	—		c. 1850	Ouverture d'un opéra comique	Comic Opera Overture in e minor	for orchestra	
Orchestral	—		c. 1850	Scherzo en la majeur	Scherzo in A major	for chamber orchestra	
Orchestral	—	159	c. 1850	Symphonie en la majeur	Symphony in A major	for orchestra	
Orchestral	2		1853	Symphonie nº 1 en mi bémol majeur	Symphony No. 1 in E♭ major	for orchestra	
Orchestral	—	162	1854	Ouverture d'un opéra comique inachevé en sol majeur	Overture to an Unfinished Comic Opera in G major	for orchestra	
Orchestral	—	163	1856	Symphonie en fa majeur "Urbs Roma"	Symphony in F major "Urbs Roma"	for orchestra	
Orchestral	55		1859	Symphonie nº 2 en la mineur	Symphony No. 2 in A minor	for orchestra	
Orchestral	49	165	1863	Suite en ré majeur: 1. Prélude; 2. Sarabande; 3. Gavotte; 4. Romance; 5. Finale	Suite in D major: 1. Prélude; 2. Sarabande; 3. Gavotte; 4. Romance; 5. Finale	for orchestra	
Orchestral	—	166	1863	Spartacus, Ouverture en mi bémol majeur	Spartacus, Overture in E♭ major	for orchestra	after the tragedy by Alphonse Pagès
Orchestral	7b	177	1866, 1891	Rhapsodie bretonne	Rhapsodie bretonne	for orchestra	1891 orchestration of 3 Rhapsodies sur des cantiques bretons for organ
Orchestral	25		1869	Orient et occident		for orchestra	original for military band
Orchestral	34	168	1871	Marche héroïque en mi bémol majeur	Heroic March in E♭ major	for orchestra	also exists in versions for piano 4-hands (1870), and 2-piano 8-hands
Orchestral	—		1872	Chant du soir (Abendlied)	Evening Song	for orchestra	transcription of Abendlied (for piano 4-hands), Op. 85 No. 12 from 12 Klavierstücke für kleine und große Kinder by Robert Schumann; also a version for piano 2-hands
Orchestral	31	169	1872	Le rouet d'Omphale en la majeur	The Spinning Wheel of Omphale in A major	for orchestra	
Orchestral	39	170	1873	Phaéton en ut majeur	Phaéton in C major	for orchestra	
Orchestral	40	171	1874	Danse macabre, Poème symphonique en sol mineur	Danse macabre, Symphonic Poem in G minor	for orchestra	
Orchestral	50	172	1877	La jeunesse d'Hercule en mi bémol majeur		for orchestra	
Orchestral	60	173	1880	Suite algérienne en ut majeur: 1. Prélude; 2. Rhapsodie mauresque 3. Rêverie du soir 4. Marche militaire française		for orchestra	recorded by the composer in piano reduction in 1919
Orchestral	63	175	1880	Une nuit à Lisbonne en mi bémol majeur		for orchestra	
Orchestral	64	174	1880	La jota aragonese en la majeur		for orchestra	
Orchestral	69		1881	Hymne à Victor Hugo	Hymn to Victor Hugo	for orchestra (with chorus ad libitum)	
Orchestral	78	176	1886	Symphonie nº 3 ("avec orgue") en ut mineur	Symphony No. 3 "Organ Symphony" in C minor	for orchestra	
Orchestral	93		1892	Sarabande et rigaudon en mi majeur	Sarabande and Rigaudon in E major	for orchestra	
Orchestral	117	180	1902	Marche du couronnement	Coronation March in E♭ major	for orchestra	written for the Coronation of Edward VII of the United Kingdom
Orchestral	130		1908	Trois tableaux symphoniques d'après La foi	3 Symphonic Pictures after "La Foi"	for orchestra	adapted from the incidental music for the play by Eugène Brieux
Orchestral	133	181	1910	Ouverture de fête en fa majeur		for orchestra	
Orchestral	—		1915	Hail! California	Hail! California	for orchestra, band and organ	composed for the 1915 Panama–Pacific International Exposition
Band	25		1869	Orient et occident		for military band	also arranged for orchestra by the composer
Band	—		1900	Hymne franco-espagnol			
Band	125		1908	Sur les bords du Nil, Marche militaire		for military band	also for piano 4-hands
Band	152		1918	Vers la victoire, Pas redoublé pour musique militaire		for military band	Two-step; also for piano 4-hands
Band	155	153	1918	Marche interalliée		for military band	also for piano 4-hands
Concertante	17	185	1858	Concerto pour piano nº 1 en ré majeur	Piano Concerto No. 1 in D major	for piano and orchestra	
Concertante	58	184	1858	Concerto pour violon nº 2 en ut majeur	Violin Concerto No. 2 in C major	for violin and orchestra	
Concertante	20	186	1859	Concerto pour violon nº 1 en la majeur	Violin Concerto No. 1 in A major	for violin and orchestra	
Concertante	16b	211	1862, 1919	Suite: 1. Prélude; 2. Sérénade; 3. Gavotte; 4. Romance; 5. Tarantelle	Suite: 1. Prélude; 2. Sérénade; 3. Gavotte; 4. Romance; 5. Tarantelle	for cello and orchestra	original version for cello and piano
Concertante	28	188	1863	Introduction et rondo capriccioso en la mineur	Introduction and Rondo Capriccioso in A minor	for violin and orchestra	
Concertante	22	190	1868	Concerto pour piano nº 2 en sol mineur	Piano Concerto No. 2 in G minor	for piano and orchestra	
Concertante	29	191	1869	Concerto pour piano nº 3 en mi bémol majeur	Piano Concerto No. 3 in E♭ major	for piano and orchestra	
Concertante	37	192	1871	Romance en ré bémol majeur	Romance in D♭ major	for flute and piano or orchestra	
Concertante	33	193	1872	Concerto pour violoncelle nº 1 en la mineur	Cello Concerto No. 1 in A minor	for cello and orchestra	
Concertante	36	195	1874	Romance en fa majeur	Romance in F major	for horn (or cello) and orchestra	
Concertante	48	196	1874	Romance en ut majeur	Romance in C major	for violin and orchestra	
Concertante	44	197	1875	Concerto pour piano nº 4 en ut mineur	Piano Concerto No. 4 in C minor	for piano and orchestra	
Concertante	—		c. 1878	Cadences pour le concerto en sol de Beethoven	Cadenzas for Beethoven's Piano Concerto No. 4	for piano	
Concertante	61	198	1880	Concerto pour violon nº 3 en si mineur	Violin Concerto No. 3 in B minor	for violin and orchestra	
Concertante	62		1880	Morceau de concert en mi mineur	Concert Piece in E minor	for violin and orchestra	
Concertante	67	189	1885	Romance en mi majeur	Romance in E major	for horn (or cello) and orchestra	also for horn (or cello) and piano
Concertante	70	37	1884	Allegro appassionato en ut dièse mineur	Allegro appassionato in C♯ minor	for piano and orchestra	also for piano solo
Concertante	73		1884	Rhapsodie d'Auvergne en ut majeur	Rhapsody of the Auvergne in C Major	for piano and orchestra	also for piano solo
Concertante	76	124	1885	Wedding Cake, Caprice-valse en la bémol majeur	Wedding Cake, Caprice-valse in A♭ major	for piano and orchestra	
Concertante	83	202	1887	Havanaise en mi majeur	Havanaise in E major	for violin and orchestra	
Concertante	94		1887	Morceau de concert en fa mineur	Concert Piece in F minor	for horn and orchestra	
Concertante	89	204	1891	Africa en sol mineur	Africa in G minor	for piano and orchestra	Also for piano solo
Concertante	103	205	1896	Concerto pour piano nº 5 "L'Égyptien" en fa majeur	Piano Concerto No. 5 "Egyptian" in F major	for piano and orchestra	
Concertante	—		1900	Cadences pour le concerto de violon de Beethoven	Cadenzas for Beethoven's Violin Concerto	for violin	
Concertante	119		1902	Concerto pour violoncelle nº 2 en ré mineur	Cello Concerto No. 2 in D minor	for cello and orchestra	
Concertante	122	207	1904	Caprice andalou en sol majeur	Caprice andalou in G major	for violin and orchestra	
Concertante	—		1906	Andante extrait d'un concerto pour piano		for violin and orchestra (or piano)	transcription of movement II from Piano Concerto No. 21, K.467 by Wolfgang Amadeus Mozart
Concertante	132	208	1910	La muse et le poète en mi mineur	La muse et le poète in E minor	for violin, cello and orchestra (or piano)	
Concertante	—	281	1911	Cadences pour le concerto en mi bémol de Mozart	Cadenzas for Mozart's Piano Concerto No. 22, K.482	for piano	
Concertante	—	279	1911	Cadences pour le concerto en ut mineur de Mozart	Cadenzas for Mozart's Piano Concerto No. 24, K.491	for piano	
Concertante	154		1918	Morceau de concert en sol majeur	Concert Piece in G major	for harp and orchestra	
Concertante	156	210	1919	Cyprès et lauriers en ré mineur		for organ and orchestra	
Concertante	162	212	1920	Odelette en ré majeur	Odelette in D major	for flute and orchestra	
Chamber music	—	107	1851–1853	Quatuor en mi majeur pour piano et cordes	Piano Quartet in E major	for violin, viola, cello and piano	
Chamber music	14		1855	Quintette en la mineur pour piano et cordes	Piano Quintet in A minor	for 2 violins, viola, cello and piano	
Chamber music	6	183	1857	Tarantelle	Tarantelle in A minor	for flute, clarinet and piano	Orchestrated in 1879
Chamber music	—		1859	Caprice brillant en si mineur	Caprice brillant in B minor	for violin and piano	
Chamber music	16	112	1862	Suite: 1. Prélude; 2. Sérénade; 3. Scherzo; 4. Romance; 5. Finale	Suite: 1. Prélude; 2. Sérénade; 3. Scherzo; 4. Romance; 5. Finale	for cello and piano	also a version for cello and orchestra
Chamber music	18		1863	Trio nº 1 en fa majeur pour piano, violon et violoncelle	Piano Trio No. 1 in F major	for violin, cello and piano	
Chamber music	15	114	1865	Sérénade en mi bémol majeur	Sérénade in E♭ major	for piano, organ, violin, and viola or cello	
Chamber music	27		1868	Romance	Romance in B♭ major	for violin, piano and organ	
Chamber music	—		1869	Marche religieuse de Lohengrin		for violin, harmonium and piano	transcription from the opera Lohengrin by Richard Wagner
Chamber music	—		c. 1870	Les odeurs de Paris		for chamber ensemble	
Chamber music	38		1871	Berceuse en si bémol majeur	Berceuse in B♭ major	for violin and piano	
Chamber music	32		1872	Sonate pour violoncelle nº 1 en ut mineur	Cello Sonata No. 1 in C minor	for cello and piano	
Chamber music	41		1875	Quatuor en si bémol majeur pour piano et cordes	Piano Quartet in B♭ major	for violin, viola, cello and piano	
Chamber music	43	194	1875	Allegro appassionato en si mineur	Allegro appassionato in B minor	for cello and piano (or orchestra)	version with orchestra, R 119
Chamber music	—		1875	Orphée, Poème symphonique		for violin, cello and piano	transcription of the symphonic poem Orpheus, S.98 (1853–1854) by Franz Liszt
Chamber music	51		1877	Romance en ré majeur	Romance in D major	for cello and piano	
Chamber music	65	122	1881	Septuor en mi bémol majeur	Septet in E♭ major	for trumpet, 2 violins, viola, cello, double bass and piano	
Chamber music	67		1885	Romance en mi majeur	Romance in E major	for horn (or cello) and piano	also for horn (or cello) and orchestra
Chamber music	75	123	1885	Sonate pour violon nº 1 en ré mineur	Violin Sonata No. 1 in D minor	for violin and piano	
Chamber music	—	125	1886	Le carnaval des animaux, grande fantaisie zoologique	The Carnival of the Animals (Le cygne)	for 2 pianos, 2 violins, viola, cello, double bass, flute (also piccolo), clarinet, glass harmonica and xylophone	
Chamber music	79	126	1887	Caprice sur des airs danois et russes		for flute, oboe, clarinet and piano	
Chamber music	91	127	1892	Chant saphique		for cello and piano	
Chamber music	92	129	1892	Trio nº 2 en mi mineur pour piano, violon et violoncelle	Piano Trio No. 2 in E minor	for violin, cello and piano	
Chamber music	95		1893	Fantaisie	Fantaisie	for harp	in A minor
Chamber music	102	130	1896	Sonate pour violon nº 2 en mi bémol majeur	Violin Sonata No. 2 in E♭ major	for violin and piano	
Chamber music	108		1897	Barcarolle en fa majeur	Barcarolle in F major	for violin, cello, harmonium and piano	
Chamber music	—		1897	Nocturne sur des motifs d'Hellé, opéra d'Alphonse Duvernoy		for violin and piano	transcription after the 1896 opera Hellé by Victor Alphonse Duvernoy; also a version for piano solo
Chamber music	112		1899	Quatuor à cordes nº 1 en mi mineur	String Quartet No. 1 in E minor	for 2 violins, viola and cello	
Chamber music	123	135	1905	Sonate pour violoncelle nº 2 en fa majeur	Cello Sonata No. 2 in F major	for cello and piano	
Chamber music	124		1907	Fantaisie	Fantaisie	for violin and harp	
Chamber music	136		1912	Triptyque: 1. Prémice; 2. Vision congolaise 3. Joyeuseté	Triptyque	for violin and piano	
Chamber music	143		1915	Élégie	Élégie [No. 1]	for violin and piano	
Chamber music	144	140	1915	Cavatine en ré bémol majeur	Cavatine in D♭ major	for trombone and piano	
Chamber music	—		c. 1918	L'air de la pendule		for violin and piano	
Chamber music	153		1918	Quatuor à cordes nº 2 en sol majeur	String Quartet No. 2 in G major	for 2 violins, viola and cello	
Chamber music	158	143	1919	Prière		for cello (or violin) and organ	version for violin, R 144
Chamber music	160	145	1920	Élégie	Élégie [No. 2]	for violin and piano	
Chamber music	166	146	1921	Sonate pour hautbois en ré majeur	Oboe Sonata in D major	for oboe and piano	
Chamber music	167	147	1921	Sonate pour clarinette en mi bémol majeur	Clarinet Sonata in E♭ major	for clarinet and piano	
Chamber music	168	148	1921	Sonate pour basson en sol majeur	Bassoon Sonata in G major	for bassoon and piano	
Chamber music	—	108	1853	Adagio en mi bémol majeur	Adagio in E♭ major	for horn and organ	
Chamber music	—			Gavotte	Gavotte	for cello and piano or orchestra	
Keyboard	1		1852	Trois morceaux	3 Pieces	for harmonium	
Keyboard	8	110	1858	Six Duos	6 Duets	for harmonium and piano	
Keyboard: organ	—		c. 1853	Deux pièces	2 Pieces	for organ	
Keyboard: organ	—	78	1857	Fantaisie en mi bémol majeur	Fantaisie in E♭ major	for organ	
Keyboard: organ	9	80	1859	Bénédiction nuptiale	Bénédiction nuptiale in F major	for organ	
Keyboard: organ	—		1863	La prédication aux oiseaux, St François d'Assise, Légende		for organ	transcription of the first St. Francis Legend, S. 175 No. 1 by Franz Liszt
Keyboard: organ	13	80	1865	Élévation, ou communion	Élévation, or Communion in E major	for organ or harmonium	
Keyboard: organ	7	87	1866	3 Rhapsodies sur des cantiques bretons, Pélérinage au pardon de Sainte Anne-la-Palud		for organ	orchestrated in 1891 as Rhapsodie bretonne, Op. 7b
Keyboard: organ	99		1894	Trois préludes et fugues: 1. Prélude et fugue en mi majeur 2. Prélude et fugue en si majeur 3. Prélude et fugue en mi bémol majeur	3 Préludes and Fugues: 1. Prélude and Fugue in E major 2. Prélude and Fugue in B major 3. Prélude and Fugue in E♭ major	for organ	
Keyboard: organ	101		1895	Fantaisie nº 2 en ré bémol majeur	Fantaisie No. 2 in D♭ major	for organ	
Keyboard: organ	107	96	1897	Marche religieuse en fa majeur		for organ	
Keyboard: organ	109		1898	Trois préludes et fugues: 1. Prélude et fugue en ré mineur 2. Prélude et fugue en sol majeur 3. Prélude et fugue en ut majeur	3 Préludes and Fugues: 1. Prélude and Fugue in D minor 2. Prélude and Fugue in G major 3. Prélude and Fugue in C major	for organ	
Keyboard: organ	150	100	1916–1917	Sept improvisations	7 Improvisations	for organ	
Keyboard: organ	157		1919	Fantaisie nº 3 en ut majeur	Fantaisie No. 3 in C major	for organ	
Keyboard: organ	—			Cinq morceaux	5 Pieces	for organ or harmonium	
Keyboard: organ	—			Morceau		for organ	
Keyboard: organ	—			Prélude en fa majeur	Prélude in F major	for organ	
Keyboard: piano	135	54	1912	Six Études pour la main gauche seule: 1. Prélude; 2. Alla fuga 3. Moto perpetuo 4. Bourrée; 5. Élégie; 6. Gigue	6 Études for the Left Hand: 1. Prélude; 2. Alla fugue 3. Moto perpetuo 4. Bourrée; 5. Élégie; 6. Gigue	for piano left hand	
Keyboard: piano	—		c. 1850	Variations sur le chœur de Judas Macchabée	Variations on the Chorus from Judas Maccabaeus	for piano 4-hands	theme: "See, the Conqu'ring Hero Comes!", Act III chorus from the oratorio Judas Maccabaeus, HWV 63 by George Frideric Handel
Keyboard: piano	11		1855	Duettino	Duettino in G major	for piano 4-hands	
Keyboard: piano	59		1880	König Harald Harfagar	König Harald Harfagar	for piano 4-hands	
Keyboard: piano	81	61	1887	Feuillet d'album		for piano 4-hands	
Keyboard: piano	86	150	1887	Pas redoublé en si bémol majeur		for piano 4-hands	
Keyboard: piano	105	63	1896	Berceuse en mi majeur	Berceuse in E major	for piano 4-hands	
Keyboard: piano	125		1908	Sur les bords du Nil, Marche militaire		for piano 4-hands	original for military band
Keyboard: piano	152		1918	Vers la victoire, Pas redoublé pour musique militaire		for piano 4-hands	original: two-step for military band; arrangement by the composer
Keyboard: piano	155	64	1918	Marche interalliée		for piano 4-hands	original for military band; arrangement by the composer
Keyboard: piano	163	65	1921	Marche dédiée aux étudiants d'Alger		for piano 4-hands with chorus ad libitum	
Keyboard: piano	8b	70	1858, 1897	Duo	Duo	for 2 pianos	after the 6 Duets for harmonium and piano
Keyboard: piano	35	66	1874	Variations sur un thème de Beethoven	Variations on a Theme of Beethoven in E♭ major	for 2 pianos	theme: Trio from movement III, Menuetto, of Ludwig van Beethoven's Piano Sonata No. 18, Op. 31 No. 3 (1802)
Keyboard: piano	96	69	1884	Caprice arabe		for 2 pianos	
Keyboard: piano	—		1884	Lenore, poème symphonique pour orchestre d'après la Ballade de Bürger	Lenore, Symphonic Poem after the Ballade de Bürger	for 2 pianos	transcription of the symphonic poem by Henri Duparc
Keyboard: piano	77	67	1885	Polonaise en fa mineur	Polonaise in F minor	for 2 pianos	
Keyboard: piano	87	68	1889	Scherzo		for 2 pianos	
Keyboard: piano	106	71	1898	Caprice héroïque		for 2 pianos	
Keyboard: piano	—		1907	Sonate en si bémol mineur de Frédéric Chopin, Op. 35	Sonata in B♭ Minor by Frédéric Chopin, Op. 35	for 2 pianos	transcription
Keyboard: piano	—		1914	Sonate en si mineur de Franz Liszt	Sonata in B Minor by Franz Liszt	for 2 pianos	transcription
Keyboard: piano	—	7	1841	Andante en sol majeur	Andante in G major	for piano	
Keyboard: piano	—	15	1842	Allegretto en mi bémol majeur	Allegretto in E♭ major	for piano	
Keyboard: piano	—		c. 1843	Valse	Waltz	for piano	
Keyboard: piano	3	25	1855	Six bagatelles	6 Bagatelles	for piano	
Keyboard: piano	—		1858	Scherzo du Songe d'une nuit d'été de Mendelssohn	Scherzo from "A Midsummer Night's Dream" by Mendelssohn	for piano	transcription from A Midsummer Night's Dream by Felix Mendelssohn
Keyboard: piano	—		1858–1859	Trois transcriptions de quatuors de Beethoven: 1. Adagio du 6^{me} quatuor 2. Scherzo du 7^{me} quatuor 3. Finale du 9^{me} quatuor	3 Transcriptions from String Quartets by Beethoven: 1. Adagio from String Quartet No. 6, Op. 18 No. 6; 2. Scherzo from String Quartet No. 7, Op. 59 No. 1; 3. Finale from String Quartet No. 9, Op. 59 No. 3	for piano	transcription of string quartet movements by Ludwig van Beethoven
Keyboard: piano	—		c. 1861	Adagio de la 3^{e} cantate d'église		for piano	transcription after Johann Sebastian Bach
Keyboard: piano	—		c. 1861	Air de la 36^{e} cantate d'église		for piano	transcription after Johann Sebastian Bach
Keyboard: piano	—		c. 1861	Andante de la 3^{e} Sonate de Violon		for piano	transcription from Sonata for Violin No. 2, BWV 1003 by Johann Sebastian Bach
Keyboard: piano	—		c. 1861	Andantino de la 8^{e} cantate d'église		for piano	transcription after Johann Sebastian Bach
Keyboard: piano	—		c. 1861	Bourrée de la 2^{e} Sonate de Violon		for piano	transcription of Tempo di Borea from Partita for Violin No. 1, BWV 1002 by Johann Sebastian Bach
Keyboard: piano	—		c. 1861	Chœur de la 30^{e} cantate d'église		for piano	transcription after Johann Sebastian Bach
Keyboard: piano	—		c. 1861	Fugue de la 5^{e} Sonate de Violon		for piano	transcription from Sonata for Violin No. 3, BWV 1005 by Johann Sebastian Bach
Keyboard: piano	—		c. 1861	Gavotte de la 6^{e} Sonate de Violon		for piano	transcription of Gavotte en rondeau from Partita for Violin No. 3, BWV 1006 by Johann Sebastian Bach
Keyboard: piano	—		c. 1861	Introduction et air de al 15^{e} cantate d'église		for piano	transcription after Johann Sebastian Bach
Keyboard: piano	—		c. 1861	Largo de la 5^{e} Sonate de Violon		for piano	transcription from Sonata for Violin No. 3, BWV 1005 by Johann Sebastian Bach
Keyboard: piano	—		c. 1861	Ouverture de la 28^{e} cantate d'église [sic]		for piano	transcription from Cantata No. 29, BWV 29 after Johann Sebastian Bach
Keyboard: piano	—		c. 1861	Presto de la 35^{e} cantate d'église		for piano	transcription after Johann Sebastian Bach
Keyboard: piano	—		c. 1861	Récitativ et air de la 30^{e} cantate d'église		for piano	transcription after Johann Sebastian Bach
Keyboard: piano	—		1862	Kermesse et valse de Faust, opéra de C. Gounod		for piano	transcription from the opera Faust by Charles Gounod
Keyboard: piano	21		1862	Mazurka nº 1 en sol mineur	Mazurka No. 1 in G minor	for piano	
Keyboard: piano	—		1867	Caprice sur les airs de ballet d'Alceste de Gluck		for piano	transcription after the opera Alceste by Christoph Willibald Gluck
Keyboard: piano	—		1867	Menuet d'Orphée		for piano	transcription from the opera Orphée et Eurydice by Christoph Willibald Gluck
Keyboard: piano	—		1869	Andante de la 36^{me} symphonie d'Haydn		for piano	transcription from Symphony No. 36 by Joseph Haydn
Keyboard: piano	—		1869	Chœur des Derviches Tourneurs tiré des Ruines d'Athèns de Beethoven	Dervish Chorus from The Ruins of Athens	for piano	transcription of the chorus from The Ruins of Athens, Op. 113 by Ludwig van Beethoven
Keyboard: piano	—		1869	Paraphrase sur Mandolinata de E. Paladilhe	Mandolinata	for piano	transcription of the song by Émile Paladilhe
Keyboard: piano	—		1870	Improvisation sur la Beethoven-Cantate de F. Liszt	Improvisation on the Beethoven Cantata by Franz Liszt	for piano	transcription after Franz Liszt
Keyboard: piano	23	31	1871	Gavotte en ut mineur	Gavotte in C minor	for piano	
Keyboard: piano	24		1871	Mazurka nº 2 en sol mineur	Mazurka No. 2 in G minor	for piano	
Keyboard: piano	—		1871	Paraphrase sur la Isleña (Havanaise), mélodie de Paladilhe	La Isleña (Havanaise)	for piano	transcription of the song by Émile Paladilhe
Keyboard: piano	—		1871	Romance sans paroles en si mineur	Romance sans paroles in B minor	for piano	
Keyboard: piano	—		1872	Chant du soir (Abendlied)	Evening Song	for piano	transcription for piano, 2-hands, of the original Abendlied for piano 4-hands, Op. 85 No. 12 from 12 Klavierstücke für kleine und große Kinder by Robert Schumann; also a version for orchestra
Keyboard: piano	70	200	1884	Allegro appassionato en ut dièse mineur	Allegro appassionato in C♯ minor	for piano	also for piano with orchestra ad libitum
Keyboard: piano	—		1875	Paraphrase sur Gallia, Cantate de C. Gounod		for piano	transcription of the 1871 oratorio by Charles Gounod
Keyboard: piano	52	35	1877	Six Études: 1. Prélude; 2. Pour l'indépendance des doigts 3. Prélude et fugue en fa mineur 4. Étude de rythme 5. Prélude et fugue en la majeur 6. En forme de valse	6 Études: 1. Prélude; 2. Pour l'indépendance des doigts 3. Prélude et fugue in F minor 4. Étude de rythme 5. Prélude et fugue in A major 6. En forme de valse	for piano	
Keyboard: piano	56	34	1872	Menuet et valse	Menuet and Waltz	for piano	
Keyboard: piano	—		1880	Andante de la 94^{me} symphonie "La surprise" d'Haydn		for piano	transcription of movement II from Symphony No. 94 by Joseph Haydn
Keyboard: piano	66		1882	Mazurka nº 3 en si mineur	Mazurka No. 3 in B minor	for piano	
Keyboard: piano	72		1884	Album: 1. Prélude; 2. Carillon; 3. Toccata; 4. Valse; 5. Chanson napolitaine 6. Finale	Album	for piano	
Keyboard: piano	—		1884	Andantino	Andantino	for piano	
Keyboard: piano	—		1884	Chanson des Maucroix de J. Durand		for piano	transcription of the song by Jacques Durand
Keyboard: piano	73	201	1884	Rhapsodie d'Auvergne en ut majeur		for piano	also for piano and orchestra; recorded by the composer for Welte-Mignon, 13 December 1905
Keyboard: piano	—		1885	Improvisation	Improvisation	for piano	
Keyboard: piano	80	40	1887	Souvenir d'Italie en sol majeur		for piano	
Keyboard: piano	85	42	1889	Les cloches du soir en la bémol majeur		for piano	
Keyboard: piano	88	43	1890	Valse canariote en la mineur	Valse canariote in A minor	for piano	
Keyboard: piano	90		1891	Suite en fa majeur: 1. Prélude et fugue 2. Menuet; 3. Gavotte; 4. Gigue	Suite in F major: 1. Prélude and Fugue; 2. Menuet; 3. Gavotte; 4. Gigue	for piano	
Keyboard: piano	97	45	1894	Thème varié	Theme and Variations	for piano	
Keyboard: piano	—		1895	La mort de Thaïs, Paraphrase de concert sur l'opéra de J. Massenet	The Death of Thaïs, Concert paraphrase	for piano	transcription after the opera Thaïs by Jules Massenet
Keyboard: piano	100		1895	Souvenir d'Ismaïlia		for piano	
Keyboard: piano	104	47	1896	Valse mignonne en mi bémol majeur		for piano	
Keyboard: piano	—		1897	Nocturne sur des motifs d'Hellé, opéra d'Alphonse Duvernoy		for piano	transcription after the 1896 opera Hellé by Victor Alphonse Duvernoy; also a version for violin and piano
Keyboard: piano	—		c. 1898	Quatre morceaux	4 Pieces	for piano	
Keyboard: piano	110	48	1898	Valse nonchalante en ré bémol majeur		for piano	
Keyboard: piano	—		1899	Deux fantaisies écrites pour le luth par D. Luis; Milan de Valence (Compositeur espagnol du XVI^{e} siècle)		for piano	transcription after Luis de Milán
Keyboard: piano	111	49	1899	Six Études: 1. Tierces majeures et mineures 2. Traits chromatiques 3. Prélude et fugue en mi bémol mineur 4. Les cloches de Las Palmas; 5. Tierces majeures chromatiques 6. Toccata (d'après le cinquième concerto)	6 Études	for piano	
Keyboard: piano	120	51	1903	Valse langoureuse		for piano	
Keyboard: piano	—		1909	Feuillet d'album	Album Leaf	for piano	
Keyboard: piano	139	55	1912	Valse gaie		for piano	
Keyboard: piano	161	57	1920	Six Fugues	6 Fugues	for piano	
Keyboard: piano	169	58	1921	Feuillet d'album	Album Leaf	for piano	
Choral: sacred	—		c. 1851	Moïse sauvé des eaux			Oratorio; words by Victor Hugo
Choral: sacred	4		1855	Messe	Mass	for 4 solo voices, chorus, orchestra and organ	
Choral: sacred	5		1856	Tantum ergo	Tantum ergo	for chorus and organ	
Choral: sacred	12		1858	Oratorio de Noël		for solo voices, chorus, string quartet, harp and organ	Oratorio
Choral: sacred	—		1858	Veni creator en ut majeur	Veni creator in C major	for chorus with organ ad libitum	
Choral: sacred	—		c. 1860	Ô Saint Autel, Cantique en ré majeur		for 3 altos, chorus and piano	Canticle
Choral: sacred	—		c. 1860	Pour vous bénir, Signeur, Cantique en mi majeur		for 3 altos, chorus and piano	Canticle; words by A. Cuinet
Choral: sacred	42		1865	Cœli enarrant (Psaume XVIII)	Cœli enarrant (Psalm 18)	for solo voices, chorus and orchestra	
Choral: sacred	45		1875	Le déluge	The Flood	for solo voices, chorus and orchestra	Oratorio; words by Louis Gallet
Choral: sacred	54		1878	Requiem	Requiem	for solo voices, chorus and orchestra	
Choral: sacred	—		1904	Offertoire pour la Toussaint en fa majeur		for chorus, organ with cello and double bass ad libitum	first version
Choral: sacred	—		1904, 1913	Offertoire pour la Toussaint en fa majeur		for chorus and orchestra	second version 1913
Choral: sacred	127		c. 1908	Psaume CL "Laudate Dominum"	Psalm 150 "Praise Ye the Lord"	for double mixed chorus, orchestra and organ	
Choral: sacred	140		1913	La terre promise	The Promised Land	for vocal soloists, chorus and orchestra	Oratorio in 3 parts; words by Hermann Klein
Choral: sacred	145		1914	Ave Maria	Ave Maria	for mixed chorus a cappella	
Choral: sacred	147		1914	Tu es Petrus	Tu es Petrus	for male chorus and organ	
Choral: sacred	148		1915	Quam Dilecta	Quam Dilecta, Motet	for mixed chorus and organ with harp ad libitum	
Choral: sacred	149		1916	Laudate Dominum	Laudate Dominum	for mixed chorus a cappella	
Choral: sacred	—			Ave verum en ré majeur	Ave verum in D major	for female chorus, organ and horn obbligato	
Choral: sacred	—			Neuf chants religieux latins	9 Sacred Latin Chants		
Choral: sacred	—			Psaume CXXXVI "Super flumina Babylonis"	Psalm 136 "Super flumina Babylonis"	for chorus	
Choral: sacred	—			Six chœurs religieux	6 Sacred Choruses		
Choral	—		c. 1848	Imogine			Cantata
Choral	—		c. 1848	Les Israëlites sur la montagne d'Oreb			Oratorio; fragment
Choral	—		c. 1848	Télésille			Cantata; words by Amable Tastu
Choral	—		c. 1849	Cantate	Cantata		words by Amable Tastu
Choral	—		c. 1850	La rose			
Choral	—		1852	Le Retour de Virginie, Cantate		for 3 voices and orchestra	
Choral	—		1852	Les cloches			Symphonic ode
Choral	—		1852	Fugue et chœur	Fugue and Chorus		
Choral	—		1852	Ode à Sainte-Cécile		for vocal soloists, chorus and orchestra	
Choral	—		1857	La toilette de la marquise de Présalé			
Choral	—		1858	Macbeth	Macbeth	for chorus and orchestra	
Choral	19		1867	Les noces de Prométhée		for narrator, soprano, baritone, double mixed chorus and orchestra	libretto by Romain Cornut
Choral	—		1867	Sérénade d'hiver		for male chorus	words by Henri Cazalis
Choral	—		1875	La nuage			
Choral	46		1876	Les soldats de Gédéon		for male chorus	words by Louis Gallet
Choral	53		1878	L'art d'être grand-père, Deux chœurs: 1. Chanson de grand-père 2. Chanson d'ancêtre		1. for female chorus and orchestra 2. for baritone, male chorus and orchestra	words by Victor Hugo
Choral	57		1879	La lyre et la harpe		for solo voices, chorus and orchestra	words by Victor Hugo
Choral	69		1881	Hymne à Victor Hugo	Hymn to Victor Hugo	for orchestra with chorus ad libitum	
Choral	68		1882	Deux chœurs: 1. Calme des nuits 2. Les fleurs et les arbres	2 Choruses	for mixed chorus with piano ad libitum	
Choral	71		1884	Deux chœurs: 1. Les marins de Kermor; 2. Les titans	2 Choruses	for chorus a cappella	words by Théobald Saint-Félix
Choral	74		1885	Saltarelle	Saltarelle	for male chorus	words by Émile Deschamps
Choral	84		1888	Les guerriers		for male chorus	words by Georges Audigier
Choral	26b		1891	Nuit persane: 1. La solitaire 2. La vallée de l'union 3. Fleurs de sang 4. Songe d'opium		for tenor, alto, narrator, mixed chorus and orchestra	words by Armand Renaud (1836–1895)
Choral	113		1899	Chants d'automne		for male chorus a cappella	words by S. Sicard
Choral	114		1900	La nuit		for soprano, female chorus and orchestra	words by Georges Audigier
Choral	115		1900	Le feu céleste		for narrator, soprano, chorus, orchestra and organ	words by Armand Silvestre
Choral	121		1903	À la France		for male chorus with mixed chorus ad libitum	words by Jules Combarieu (1859–1916)
Choral	—		1905	Ode d'Horace		for male chorus a cappella	
Choral	126		1906	La gloire de Corneille		for soloists, chorus and orchestra	Cantata; words by Sébastien-Charles Leconte (1860–1934) and Pierre Corneille
Choral	129		1909	Le matin		for male chorus a cappella	words by Alphonse de Lamartine
Choral	131		1911	La gloire		for tenor, baritone, mixed chorus and piano	words by Lucien Augé de Lassus
Choral	134		1912	Aux aviateurs		for male chorus	words by Jean Bonnerot
Choral	137		1912	Aux mineurs		for male chorus	words by Jean Bonnerot
Choral	138		1912	Hymne au printemps		for male chorus	words by Jean Bonnerot
Choral	141		1913	Deux chœurs: 1. Des pas dans l'allée: Madrigal; 2. Trinquons: Chanson à boire	2 Choruses	for mixed chorus a cappella	1. words by Maurice Boukay; 2. words by Pierre-Jean de Béranger
Choral	142		1914	Hymne au travail		for male chorus	words by Jean Bonnerot
Choral	151		1917	Trois chœurs: 1. Chansons des aiguilles 2. Salut au chevalier 3. Le sourire	3 Choruses	for female chorus and piano	1. words by Jean Bonnerot; 2. words by Paul Fournier; 3. words by Jean Mirval
Choral	—		1920	Hymne à Jeanne d'Arc		for chorus and organ	
Choral	164		—	Aux conquérants de l'air		for chorus of 2 equal voices and piano	
Choral	165		—	Le printemps		for chorus of 2 equal voices and piano	words by Jean de La Fontaine
Choral	—		—	Canon		for female chorus a cappella	
Vocal: sacred	—		c. 1844	À Saint Joseph, Cantique			Canticle
Vocal: sacred	—		c. 1844	Dans ce beau moi, Cantique			Canticle
Vocal: sacred	—		c. 1844	Nous qu'en ces lieux, Cantique			Canticle
Vocal: sacred	—		c. 1844	Reçois mes hommages, Cantique			Canticle
Vocal: sacred	—		c. 1855	La madonna col bambino, Cantique en fa majeur		for alto and piano	Canticle; words by St. Alfonso di Liguori
Vocal: sacred	—		1858	O salutaris en si bémol majeur	O salutaris in B♭ major	for soprano, alto, baritone and organ	
Vocal: sacred	—		c. 1859	Ave Maria en si bémol majeur	Ave Maria in B♭ major	for soprano and organ	
Vocal: sacred	—		c. 1859	Ave Maria en mi majeur	Ave Maria in E major	for baritone and organ	
Vocal: sacred	—		c. 1860	Ave Maria en la majeur	Ave Maria in A major	for 2 altos and organ	
Vocal: sacred	—		c. 1860	Ave verum en si bémol majeur	Ave verum in B♭ major	for soprano, alto, tenor, bass and organ	
Vocal: sacred	—		c. 1860	Heureux qui du cœur de Marie, Cantique en la majeur		for alto (or chorus) and piano	Canticle
Vocal: sacred	—		c. 1860	O salutaris en la majeur	O salutaris in A major	for alto and organ	
Vocal: sacred	—		c. 1860	Reine des cieux, Cantique en la bémol majeur		for alto (or chorus) and piano	Canticle
Vocal: sacred	—		c. 1860	Sub tuum en fa mineur	Sub tuum in F minor	for soprano, alto and organ	
Vocal: sacred	—		c. 1860	Tantum ergo en mi bémol majeur	Tantum ergo in E♭ major	for 2 sopranos, alto and organ with chorus ad libitum	
Vocal: sacred	—		c. 1863	Ave verum en si mineur	Ave verum in B minor	for soprano, alto and organ	
Vocal: sacred	—		1865	Ave Maria en la majeur	Ave Maria in A major	for soprano or tenor and organ	
Vocal: sacred	—		1865	Inviolata en ré majeur	Inviolata in D major	for alto and organ	
Vocal: sacred	—		1869	O salutaris en la bémol majeur	O salutaris in A♭ major	for soprano, alto, baritone and organ	
Vocal: sacred	—		1875	O salutaris en mi bémol majeur	O salutaris in E♭ major	for soprano and organ	
Vocal: sacred	—		1884	O salutaris en mi majeur	O salutaris in E major	for tenor, baritone and organ	
Vocal: sacred	—		1884	O salutaris en mi bémol majeur	O salutaris in E♭ major	for alto and organ	
Vocal: sacred	—		1885	Deus Abraham en fa majeur	Deus Abraham in F major	for alto and organ	
Vocal: sacred	—		1885	Pie Jesu en ut mineur	Pie Jesu in C minor	for bass and organ	
Vocal: sacred	—		1898	Panis angelicus en fa majeur	Panis angelicus in F major	for tenor or soprano, string quartet or organ	
Vocal: sacred	—		1917	Litanies à la Sainte Vierge		for voice and organ	
Vocal	—			Les heures		for narrator and piano	
Vocal	—		1841	Ariel		for voice and piano	
Vocal	—		1841	Le soir		for voice and piano	words by Marceline Desbordes-Valmore
Vocal	—		c. 1841	La maman		for voice and piano	words by Amable Tastu
Vocal	—		1844	Tandis que sur vos ans		for voice and piano	
Vocal	—		c. 1847	La Golfe de Baya		for voice and piano	words by Alphonse de Lamartine
Vocal	—		1849	Télésille		for voice and piano	words by Amable Tastu
Vocal	—		1850	Bergeronnette		for voice and piano	words by J. Lombard
Vocal	—		1850	Lamento		for voice and piano	words by Théophile Gautier
Vocal	—		1850	Le lac		for voice and piano	words by Alphonse de Lamartine
Vocal	—		1851	Guitare		for voice and piano	words by Victor Hugo
Vocal	—		1851	Le poète mourant		for voice and piano	words by Alphonse de Lamartine
Vocal	—		1851	Le rendezvous		for voice and piano	words by Eugène Fiéffé
Vocal	—		1851	Rêverie		for voice and orchestra	words by Victor Hugo
Vocal	—		1852	Idylle		for voice and piano	words by Deschoulières
Vocal	—		c. 1852	L'automne		for voice and piano	words by Alphonse de Lamartine
Vocal	—		1852	Le pas d'armes du Roi Jean		for voice and orchestra	words by Victor Hugo
Vocal	—		1852	Mélodie		for voice and orchestra	words by Alphonse de Lamartine
Vocal	—		1853	Le feuille de peuplier		for voice and orchestra	words by Amable Tastu
Vocal	—		1854	Ruhethal		for voice and piano	words by Ludwig Uhland
Vocal	—		c. 1854	La chasse du burgrave		for voice and piano	
Vocal	—		c. 1854	La porta dell'inferno		for voice and piano	words by Dante
Vocal	—		c. 1855	La cloche		for voice and piano	words by Victor Hugo
Vocal	—		c. 1855	L'attente		for voice and orchestra	words by Victor Hugo
Vocal	—		1855	Le lever de la lune		for voice and piano	words by Ossian
Vocal	—		1855	Le sommeil des fleurs		for voice and piano	words by G. de Penmarch
Vocal	—		1855	Pastorale, Duettino		for 2 voices and piano	words by Destouches
Vocal	—		c. 1855	Plainte		for voice and orchestra	words by Amable Tastu
Vocal	—		c. 1855	Viens!		for soprano, baritone and piano	words by Victor Hugo
Vocal	—		1856	À la lune		for voice and piano	
Vocal	—		c. 1857	La mort d'Ophélie, Ballade		for voice and piano	words by Ernest Legouvé after William Shakespeare
Vocal	—		1857	Le soir descend sur la colline, Barcarolle		for alto, tenor and piano	
Vocal	—		c. 1858	Pourquoi t'exiler		for voice and piano	
Vocal	—		c. 1858	Souvenances		for voice and piano	words by Ferdinand Lemaire
Vocal	—		c. 1860	Alla riva del Tebro		for voice and piano	
Vocal	—		c. 1860	Étoile du matin		for soprano or tenor and piano	words by Camille Distel
Vocal	—		c. 1860	Extase		for voice and piano	words by Victor Hugo
Vocal	10		1860	Scène d'Horace		for soprano, baritone and orchestra	words by Pierre Corneille
Vocal	—		1862	Soirée en mer		for voice and piano	words by Victor Hugo
Vocal	—		c. 1863	Canzonetta toscana		for voice and piano	
Vocal	—		c. 1864	Le matin		for voice and piano	words by Victor Hugo
Vocal	—		c. 1865	Claire de lune		for voice and piano	words by Catulle Mendès
Vocal	—		1865	Heures passées		for voice and piano	words by A. Lenfaut
Vocal	—		1865	L'enlèvement		for voice and orchestra	words by Victor Hugo
Vocal	—		1868	Le chant de ceux qui s'en vont sur la mer		for voice and piano	words by Victor Hugo
Vocal	—		1868	La coccinelle		for voice and piano	words by Victor Hugo
Vocal	—		1868	Maria-Lucrezia		for voice and piano	words by Ernest Legouvé
Vocal	—		c. 1868	Tristesse		for voice and piano	words by Ferdinand Lemaire
Vocal	—		c. 1869	À quoi bon attendre		for voice and piano	words by Victor Hugo
Vocal	—		c. 1869	Marquise, vous souvenez-vous?, Menuet		for mezzo-soprano or baritone and piano	words by François Coppée
Vocal	26		1870	Mélodies persanes: 1. La brise 2. La splendeur vide 3. La solitaire 4. Sabre en main 5. Au cimetière 6. Tournoiement (Songe d'opium)		for voice and piano	words by Armand Renaud (1836–1895)
Vocal	—		1870	Si vous n'avez rien à me dire		for voice and piano	words by Victor Hugo
Vocal	—		1871	A Voice by the Cedar Tree	A Voice by the Cedar Tree	for voice and piano	words by Alfred, Lord Tennyson
Vocal	—		1871	Désir de l'Orient		for voice and piano	words by the composer
Vocal	—		1871	El desdichado, Bolero		for 2 voices and orchestra	words by Jules Barbier
Vocal	—		1871	My Land	My Land	for voice and piano	words by T. Davis
Vocal	—		1872	Dans ton cœur		for voice and piano	words by Henri Cazalis
Vocal	—		1872	Danse macabre		for voice and piano	words by Henri Cazalis
Vocal	—		c. 1877	Vogue, vogue la galère, Barcarolle		for voice and harmonium ad libitum	words by Jean Aicard
Vocal	—		1879	Night Song of Preciosa	Night Song of Preciosa	for voice and piano	words by Isaac Ginner
Vocal	—		1880	Dans les coins bleus		for voice and piano	words by Charles Augustin Sainte-Beuve
Vocal	—		1885	Chanson à boire du vieux temps		for voice and piano	words by Nicolas Boileau-Despréaux
Vocal	—		1885	Ronde		for voice and piano	words by François Coppée
Vocal	—		1885	Une flûte invisible		for voice and flute	words by Victor Hugo
Vocal	82		1887	La fiancée du timbalier		for mezzo-soprano and orchestra	words by Victor Hugo
Vocal	—		1888	Suzette et Suzon		for voice and piano	words by Victor Hugo
Vocal	—		1890	Guitares et mandolines		for voice and piano	words by the composer
Vocal	—		1890	Présage de la croix		for voice and piano	words by Stéphan Bordèse
Vocal	—		1891	Aimons-nous		for voice and orchestra	words by Théodore de Banville
Vocal	—		1891	Amour viril		for voice and piano	words by Georges Boyer
Vocal	—		1892	Là-bas		for voice and piano	words by Jean-Louis Croze
Vocal	—		1892	Les fées		for voice and orchestra	words by Théodore de Banville
Vocal	—		1892	Les fleurs		for voice and piano	words by V. de Collerville
Vocal	—		1892	Le rossignol		for voice and piano	words by Théodore de Banville
Vocal	—		1892	Madeleine		for voice and piano	words by Alfred Tranchant
Vocal	—		1892	Romance		for voice and harp	words by Émile Bergerat
Vocal	—		1893	Fière beauté		for voice and orchestra	words by Augustin Mahot
Vocal	—		1893	La sérénité		for mezzo-soprano or baritone and piano	words by Marie-Anne Barbier
Vocal	—		1893	Peut-être?		for voice and piano	words by Jean-Louis Croze
Vocal	—		1893	Primavera		for mezzo-soprano or baritone and piano	words by Paul Stuart
Vocal	—		1893	Vive Paris, vive la France		for voice and piano	words by Alfred Tranchant
Vocal	—		1894	La libellule		for voice and orchestra	words by the composer
Vocal	98		1894	Pallas Athéné		for soprano and orchestra	words by Jean-Louis Croze
Vocal	—		1894	Pourquoi rester seulette?		for voice and piano	words by Jean-Louis Croze
Vocal	—		1896	Vénus		for 2 voices and piano	words by the composer
Vocal	—		1897	Madrigal		for voice and piano	words by Molière
Vocal	—		1898	Alla riva del Tebro		for voice and piano	arrangement of a madrigal by Giovanni Pierluigi da Palestrina
Vocal	—		1898	Les vendanges		for voice and orchestra	words by S. Sicard
Vocal	—		1898	Lever de soleil sur le Nil		for voice and orchestra	words by the composer
Vocal	—		1898	Si je l'osais		for voice and piano	words by Alfred Tranchant
Vocal	—		1898	Sonnet		for voice and piano	words by the composer
Vocal	—		1900	Les cloches de la mer		for voice and piano	words by the composer
Vocal	116	329	1900	Lola	Lola	for soprano and orchestra	words by Stéphan Bordèse
Vocal	—		1901	Désir d'amour		for baritone and piano	words from the Spanish, Deseo de amor, by Francisco Perpiñá
Vocal	—		1901	Elle		for voice and piano	words by Charles Lecocq
Vocal	118		1902	Romance du soir		for soprano, alto, tenor and bass	words by Jean-Louis Croze
Vocal	—		1903	L'arbre		for voice and piano	words by Jean Moréas
Vocal	—		1903	Sœur Anne		for voice and piano	words by André Pressat
Vocal	—		1906	Le fleuve		for voice and piano	words by Georges Audigier
Vocal	—		1907	L'étoile		for voice and piano	words by Prince Haïdar-Pacha
Vocal	—		1907–1921; 1907; 1921; 1921; 1920; 1921	Cinq poèmes de Ronsard: 1. L'amour oyseau 2. L'amour blessé 3. À Sainte-Blaise; 4. Grasselette et Maigrelette; 5. L'amant malheureux	5 Poems of Ronsard	for voice and piano	words by Pierre de Ronsard
Vocal	—		1907	Soir romantique		for voice and piano	words by Comtesse de Noailles
Vocal	—		1907	Violons dans le soir		for voice, violin and piano	words by Comtesse de Noailles
Vocal	—		1908	Fomicacicadéide		for voice and piano	
Vocal	—		1910?	La cigale et la fourmi		for voice and piano	words by Jean de La Fontaine
Vocal	—		1912	Le vent dans la plaine		for voice and piano	words by Paul Verlaine
Vocal	146		1914	La cendre rouge, Dix poèmes lyriques: 1. Prélude; 2. Âme triste 3. Douceur; 4. Silence; 5. Pâques; 6. Jour de pluie 7. Amoroso; 8. Mai; 9. Petite main 10. Reviens		for voice and piano	words by Georges Docquois (1863–1927)
Vocal	—		1914	Les sapins		for voice and piano	words by Paul Martin
Vocal	—		1914	Vive la France		for voice and piano	words by Paul Fournier
Vocal	—		1915	La Française		for voice and piano	words by Miguel Zamacoïs
Vocal	—		c. 1915	Ne l'oubliez pas		for voice and piano	words by Mme. Félix Regnault
Vocal	—		1915	S'il est un charmant gazon		for voice and piano	words by Victor Hugo
Vocal	—		1917	Honneur à l'Amérique		for voice and piano	words by Paul Fournier
Vocal	—		1918	Angélus		for voice and piano or orchestra	words by Pierre Aguétant
Vocal	—		1918	Où nous avons aimé		for voice and piano or orchestra	words by Pierre Aguétant
Vocal	—		1918	Papillons		for voice and piano or orchestra	words by Renée de Léché
Vocal	—		1918	Victoire!		for voice and piano	words by Paul Fournier
Vocal	159		1919	Hymne à la paix		for high voice and piano	words by J. L. Faure
Vocal	—		1921	Vieilles chansons: 1. Temps nouveau 2. Avril; 3. Villanelle		for voice and piano	1. words by Charles d'Orléans; 2. words by Rémy Belleau; 3. words by Jean Vauquelin de la Fresnaye
Vocal	—		—	Antwort		for voice and piano	words by Ludwig Uhland
Vocal	—		—	Chanson de Fortunio		for voice and piano	words by Alfred de Musset
Vocal	—		—	L'echo de la harpe		for voice and piano	
Vocal	—		—	God Save the King	God Save the King	for voice and piano	words in French translation
Vocal	—		—	Primavera		for voice and piano	words by Charles d'Orléans
Vocal	—		—	Sérénade		for voice and orchestra	words by L. Mangeot
Vocal	—		—	Toi		for voice and piano	words by Édouard St. Chaffray
