= Symphony No. 2 (Saint-Saëns) =

Orchestral work composed by Camille Saint-Saëns

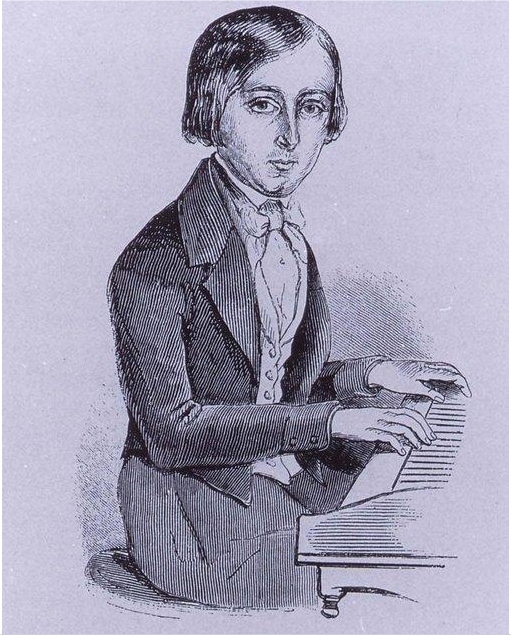
Camille Saint-Saëns in 1846

Symphony No. 2 in A minor, Op. 55, is an orchestral work composed by Camille Saint-Saëns in 1859.

== History ==
Saint-Saëns wrote a total of five symphonies, three of which are numbered: the 'first' (actually his second), this one (which is actually his fourth), and his famous 'third' (actually his fifth), known as the "Organ Symphony." In addition to these, he composed a Symphony in A major at the age of 15, as well as one in F major entitled Urbs Roma ("City of Rome") in 1857.

Saint-Saëns composed this symphony at the age of 24. He would not return to the symphony as a musical form until 27 years later, with his Organ Symphony.

Dedicated to the violinist, pianist, and conductor Jules Pasdeloup, it was premiered on 25 March 1860 in the Salle Pleyel, Paris.

== Structure ==
The symphony consists of four movements:

1. Adagio marcato – Allegro appassionato
2. Adagio
3. Scherzo: Presto
4. Prestissimo

A typical performance takes a little over 20 minutes; the work is concise and dense, with a fugal first movement and a scherzo without repeats.

== Recordings ==
- Orchestre national de l'ORTF, conducted by Jean Martinon (5 symphonies complete). 2 CD Emi 1974
- London Symphony Orchestra, conducted by Yondani Butt. CD ASV 1987
- Vienna Symphony Orchestra, conducted by Georges Prêtre (with Symphony no 1). CD Erato Musifrance 1991
- Tapiola Sinfonietta, conducted by Jean-Jacques Kantorow (with Symphony en fa majeur 2 Urbs Roma"). CD Bis 1997
- Ulster Orchestra, conducted by Yan Pascal Tortelier (with the Symphony No 3). CD Chandos 2000
- Orchestre National de Bretagne, conducted by Nicolas Chalvin CD Timpani 2006
- Malmö Symphony Orchestra, conducted by Marc Soustrot (with Symphony no 1). CD Naxos 2015
- Utah Symphony, conducted by Thierry Fisher (5 symphonies complete). 3 CD Hyperion 2018 2019
- Orchestre Philharmonique de Liège, conducted by Jean-Jacques Kantorow (5 symphonies complete). 2 SACD Bis 2021. Diapason d’or
- Orchestre National de France, conducted by Cristian Măcelaru (5 symphonies complete). 3 CD Warner classics 2021. 5 Diapasons
