= Serenade in E-flat major =

Serenade in E-flat major may refer to:

- Serenade in E-flat major (Saint-Saëns)
- Serenade for Strings (Suk)
