= Phaéton (Saint-Saëns) =

Symphonic poem by Camille Saint-Saëns

- by Camille Saint-Saëns
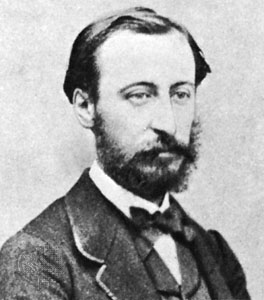
- Saint-Saëns circa 1875
- English: Phaethon
- Key: C major
- Catalogue: R170
- Opus: 39
- Period: Romanticism
- Genre: Symphonic poem
- Composed: 1873
- Dedication: Madame Berthe Pochet
- Published: 1875
- Publisher: Éditions Durand-Schönewerk & Cie
- Duration: 8–10 minutes
- Movements: 1
- Scoring: Symphony Orchestra

Premiere
- Date: December 7, 1873
- Location: Théâtre du Châtelet, Paris
- Conductor: Édouard Colonne
- Performers: Concert National

Phaéton (Phaethon), Op. 39, is a symphonic poem for orchestra, composed by Camille Saint-Saëns in 1873. It is the second in his genre's tetralogy, preceded by Le Rouet d'Omphale and followed by Danse macabre and La jeunesse d'Hercule. The work was premiered at the Théâtre du Châtelet on 7 December 1873, performed by the Concert National conducted by Édouard Colonne. Despite its initial cool reception, the work has managed to remain in the borders of the repertoire, but is largely overshadowed in popularity by Danse Macabre.

== Background ==
Hector Berlioz was an early influence of Camille Saint-Saëns, and his four programmatic symphonies paved the way for the introduction of the symphonic poem by Franz Liszt. While César Franck was the first French composer to write a symphonic poem between 1845–46, titled Ce qu'on entend sur la montagne, it was neither performed nor published during the composer's lifetime. Unaware of Franck's work, Saint-Saëns was an early admirer of the symphonic poems of Franz Liszt.

je n'avais pas subi sa fascination personnelle, je ne l'avais encore ni vu ni entendu quand je me suis épris à la lecture de ses premiers Poèmes symphoniques, quand ils m'ont indiqué le chemin où je devais rencontrer plus tard la Danse macabre, le Rouet d'Omphale et autres œuvres de même nature

I had not experienced his personal fascination, I had not yet seen or heard him when I fell in love with his first symphonic poems, when they showed me the path on which I was later to meet Danse macabre, Le Rouet d'Omphale and other works of the same nature

— Portraits et Souvenirs, "Franz Liszt" (1900)

A meeting with the Hungarian composer was the inspiration behind Saint-Saëns's Le Rouet d'Omphale, but their approach to the genre were quite different. In Liszt's conception of program music, musical form always took precedence over the extra-musical source. Saint-Saëns's instead began with details that were worked into large, more abstract forms. According to musicologist Timothy Flynn, "This approach would suggest that Saint-Saéns was thinking more symphonically and less programmatically."

Like Liszt, Saint-Saëns made use of the thematic transformation technique, in which a theme is continuously transformed to suit different moods or scenes of a story, while bringing formal unity and structure to the music. Saint-Saëns would employ this technique in other works, such as in his Symphony No. 3 in C minor.

Saint-Saëns had several interests beyond music, and ancient history was one of them. This interest reflects not only in three of the four symphonic poems, but in the chosen texts of several hymns and opera libretti. Later he would even write an essay titled "Note on the Theater Sets of Roman Antiquity." It is possible the piece may have been inspired by Jean-Baptiste Lully's opera Phaëton.

== Composition ==
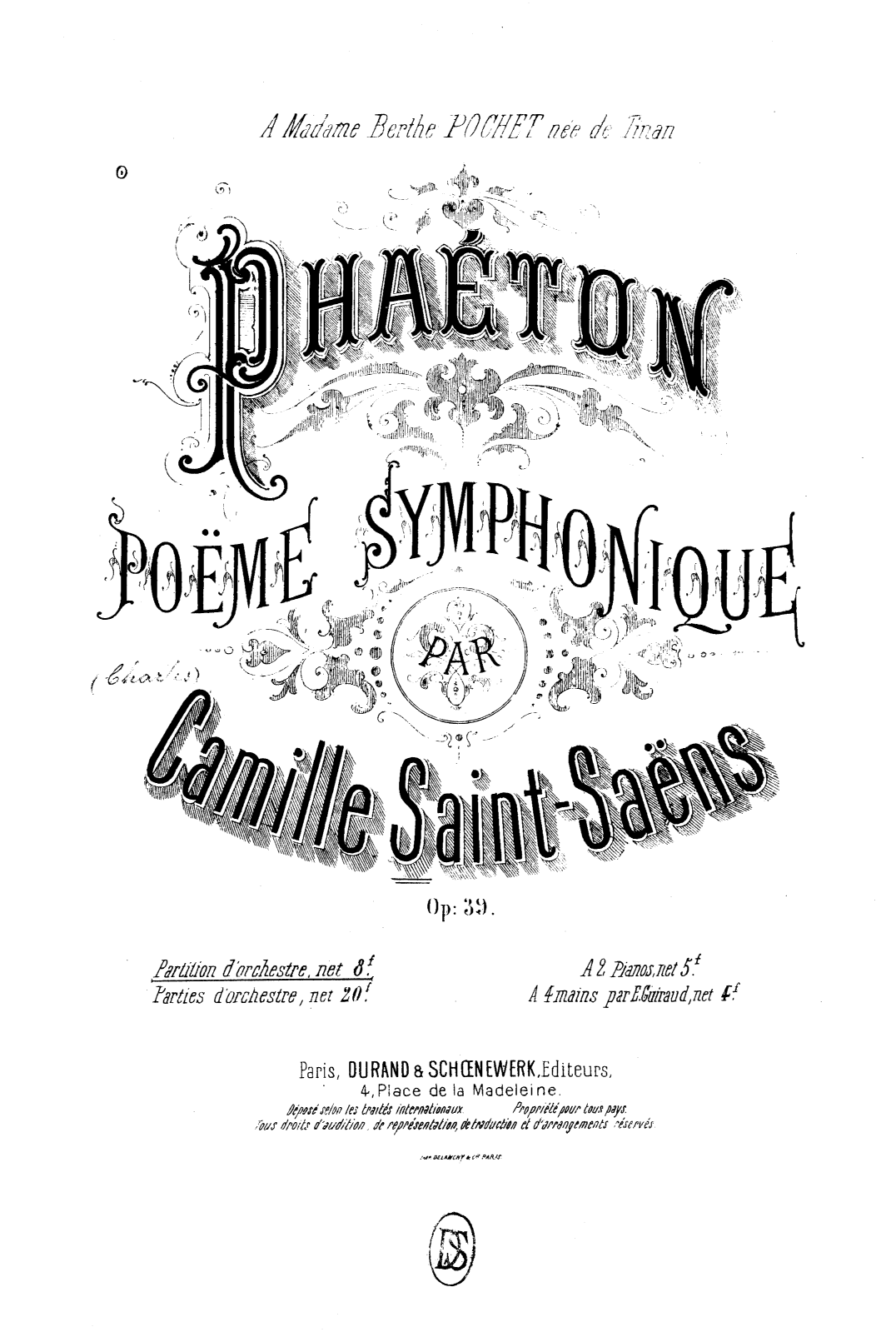
Cover of the first edition

The manuscript was completed on 12 March 1873, being dedicated to Berthe Pochet, (Note: Pochet de Tinan, Berthe (1839-1903)) a close pupil of the composer. Saint-Saëns own mother later transcribed and corrected the score. It was written during a period of failing health due to an exhausting workload consisting of composition, teaching, and concert and organ performances at La Madeleine. It was played in a two-piano reduction on 4 March 1874, performed by Marie and Alfred Jaëll. After its premiere, it was published by Éditions Durand-Schönewerk & Cie in July 1875.

Musicologist Daniel Fallon remarks the technical similarity between Le Rouet d'Omphale and Phaéton, both featuring a rhythmic motive that plays throughout the piece, while at the same time they are opposites in character. Le Rouet d'Omphale is sensuous and delicate in nature, while Phaéton is bold and dramatic. Saint-Saëns himself drew comparison between the works with the following comment: "The central idea of 'Phaéton' is pride, as the central idea of 'Le Rouet d'Omphale' is lust."

== Program ==
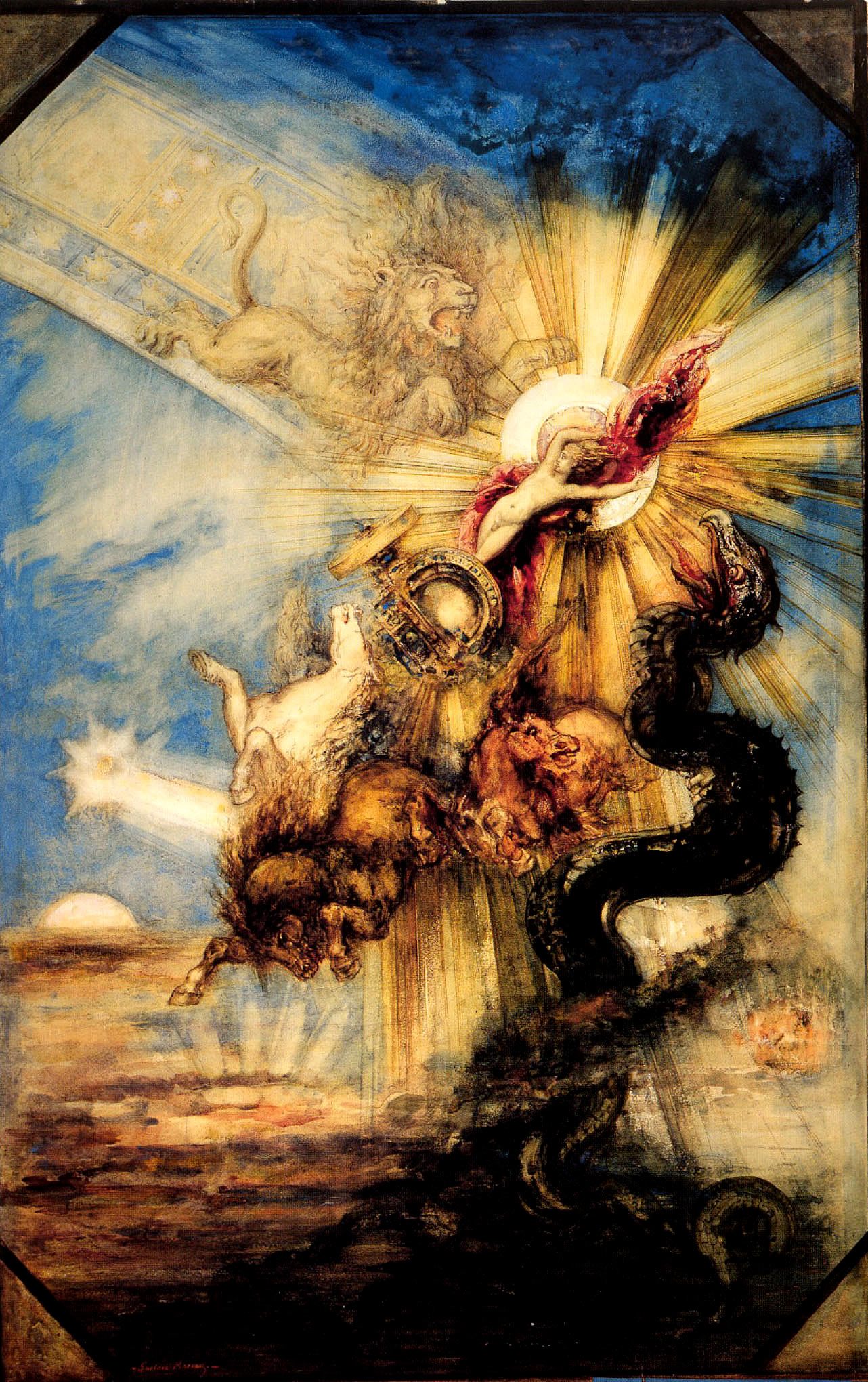
"Fall of Phaeton" (1878) by Gustave Moreau

The work depicts the ancient Greek myth of Phaethon as narrated by Ovid in Books I–II of the Metamorphoses. In it Phaethon is the son of Helios who, out of a desire to have his parentage confirmed, travels to the sun god's palace in the east. He is recognised by his father and asks for the privilege of driving his chariot for a single day. Despite Helios' fervent warnings and attempts to dissuade him, counting the numerous dangers he would face in his celestial journey and reminding Phaethon that only he can control the horses, the boy is not dissuaded and does not change his mind.

He is then allowed to take the chariot's reins; his ride is disastrous, as he cannot keep a firm grip on the horses. As a result, he drives the chariot too close to the Earth, burning it, and too far from it, freezing it. In the end, after many complaints, from the stars in the sky to the Earth itself, Zeus strikes Phaethon with one of his lightning bolts, killing him instantly. His dead body falls into the river Eridanus, and his sisters, the Heliades, cry tears of amber and are turned to black poplar as they mourn him.

The score is preceded by a program note, which is absent in the manuscript. It was written by Saint-Saëns himself.

Phaéton a obtenu de conduire dans le Ciel le char du Soleil, son père. Mais ses mains inhabiles égarent les coursiers. Le char flamboyant, jeté hors de sa route, s'approche des régions terrestres. Tout l'univers va périr embrasé, lorsque Jupiter frappe de sa foudre l'imprudent Phaéton.

Phaethon has been granted permission to drive the chariot of his father, the Sun, across the sky. But his clumsy hands lead the steeds astray. The flaming chariot, thrown off course, approaches the earthly regions. The entire universe is about to perish in flames, when Jupiter strikes the imprudent Phaethon with his thunderbolt.

— Program note for the 1875 publication

== Instrumentation ==
The piece is scored for symphony orchestra.

Woodwinds

1 piccolo
2 flutes (doubling piccolos)
2 oboes
2 clarinets
2 bassoons
1 contrabassoon (ad libitum)

Brass

4 horns (2 being natural horns)
2 trumpets
2 trombones
1 tubas

Percussion

4 sets of timpani
bass drum
cymbals
tam-tam

Strings

2 harps
Violins I
Violins II
Violas
Violoncellos
Double basses

== Arrangements ==
The piece has been extensively arranged, here is a list in chronological order.

- Two pianos (December 1874) by Camille Saint-Saëns.
- Piano four-hand (September 1883) by Ernest Guiraud.
- Military Band (1898) by P. Lançon.
- Two pianos, violin, and optional violoncello (March 1900) by Léon Roques.
- Solo piano (December 1906) by A. Benfeld.
- Chamber orchestra (June 1910) by Hubert Mouton.
- Orchestra and harmonium (May 1914) by Hubert Mouton.
- Piano trio; piano, violin and violoncello (February 1928) by Roger Branga.
  - Alternative version for piano, flute and violin.
  - Alternative version for piano, flute, violoncello, with optional contrabassoon and clarinet.

== Form ==
Camille Saint-Saëns, Phaéton
L'Orchestre de L'Association des Concerts Colonne conducted by Louis Fourestier

The piece is written in a single movement structured in several sections. Vincent d'Indy formally described the piece in two major sections, further subdivided in three each. On the other hand, Fallon claims it to be closer to a rondo.

I. Maestoso (𝅘𝅥 = 72) − Allº animato (𝅘𝅥 = 160) − (𝅘𝅥 = 168) - Le double plus lent (𝅘𝅥 = 80)

It begins with a brief maestoso introduction, with brass chords answered by rushing ascending scales from strings and woods. Fallon points the similarity between the opening with those from Liszt's Prometheus and Mazeppa. The allegro then starts with a rhythmic main theme in C major, presented by strings and harp and built on a nearly omnipresent ostinato figure, which is basis of the entire piece. It could be interpreted as Phaethon riding through the sky. According to Fallon, this programmatic depiction of galloping horses through triplet rhythm brings comparisons not only with Liszt's Mazeppa, but also with Hector Berlioz's "The ride to the Abyss" from La Damnation de Faust, as well as Franz Schubert's lied Erlkönig. The same rhythmic pattern is found in Saint-Saëns La Chase du Burgrave from 1854.

The theme modulates through several keys and more instruments are added. A crescendo leads to a solemn and expansive second theme in G major, presented by trumpets and trombones over violin ostinato figures. It possibly represents Phaethon himself. Violins then take it in piano with abundant thrills, before woodwinds take the material. A kind of development section takes place with the return of the main theme, followed by a shortened version of the second while ascending through several keys. A transition then leads to a lyrical and cantabile third theme in E-flat major, scored for horns and clarinets while violins resume their accompaniment role. It is then repeated as the rest of woodwinds join in. Fallon describes that the meaning of this piece has puzzled commentators, variously called "a song of bliss foreshadowing Phaethon's destiny", "the rising sun", "the splendour of the sun" and "a smiling view of terrestrial regions". Fallon himself claimed its purpose was to introduce lyrical contrast.

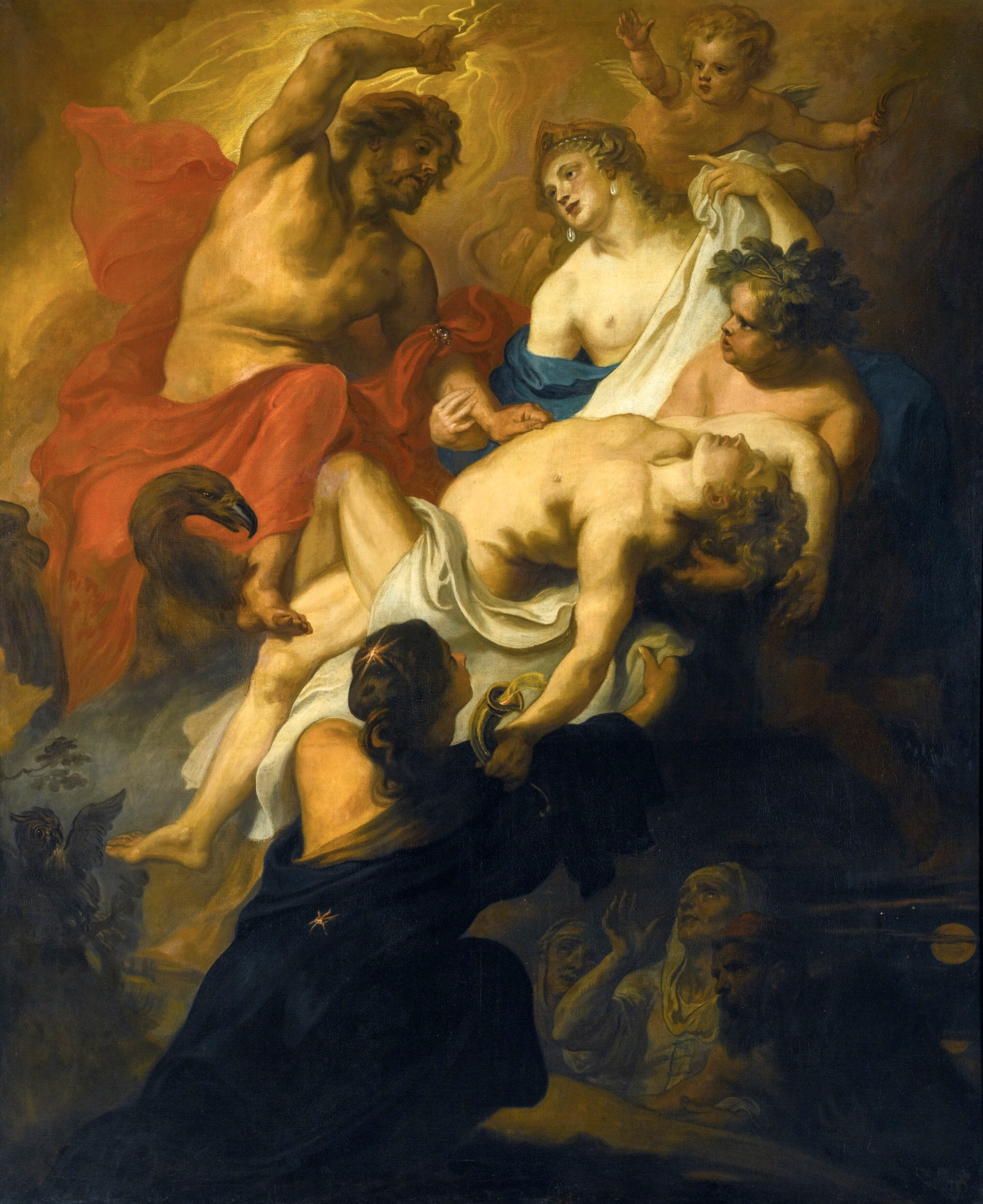
"The Gods mourning Phaeton" by Theodoor van Thulden

After a chromatic descent of the theme on strings, the galloping motive returns in a tonally unstable way, possibly representing Phaethon's anxiety that will lead to his demise. The music modulates upwards from D to G major, before a fragment of the second theme returns on trombones between G major/minor, in canon with woodwinds. Fallon notes that the following chromatic ascension of violins and violas is a device Saint-Saëns would reuse in Danse Macabre. After several dissonant chords, an ominous motive appears on bassoon, contrabassoon, tuba, cellos and basses, which in turn leads to a chromatic ascension. A thunderous climax is achieved on full orchestra with an E-flat major chord, followed by a descending motive derived from the second theme. This fortisissimo climax represents Zeus killing Phaethon with his lightning bolt.

The music then slows down, the third theme reappears on cellos in a funeral tone, which according to Fallon, is reminiscent of Liszt's Les Préludes. It is followed by the second theme on woodwinds. This is a clear example of thematic transformation, the material being transformed in a dirge to Phatheon. After a series of alternations between dominant and tonic, the work ends quietly.

== Performances and reception ==
The work was premiered at the Théâtre du Châtelet on 7 December 1873, performed by the Concert National conducted by Édouard Colonne. The parisian audience received the work with coldness, and critics dismissed the piece and program music in general, considered as unworthy of a serious musician. A critic maintained that he heard "the noise of a hack coming down from Montmartre" rather than the galloping fiery horses of Greek legend that inspired the piece. Saint-Saëns was unaffected by critic's opinions, stating that music must be judged by itself instead of what it claims to represent. The piece was better received in the ensuing performance on 12 December.

It was then performed in Berlin in February 1876, played by Benjamin Bilse's Orchestra. Further performances took place in France and Germany. In the United States, the work was first performed in Boston's Music Hall on 2 March 1876, performed by the Harvard Musical Association conducted by Carl Zerrahn. In the ensuing three years it was played in New York, Philadelphia, Cincinnati, Baltimore, Pittsburg, St. Louis and Milwaukee. With the exception of the latter, these performances were played by the Theodore Thomas Orchestra led by Carl Zerrahn.

In England, the work was first performed in London on 31 March 1898, played by the Royal Philharmonic Society of London directed by Sir Alexander Mackenzie. Saint-Saëns himself conducted the work in Rio de Janeiro, Brazil, on 25 June 1899. The piece was performed during the Brussels International Exposition of 1910, alongside works by Dukas, Debussy, Franck, Fauré, and Berlioz. Another noteworthy performance occasion was on 2 April 1913 during the inauguration of the Théâtre des Champs-Élysées, also conducted by the composer.

== Legacy ==
Despite its initial cool reception, the work has managed to remain within the borders of the classical repertoire, but it is largely overshadowed in popularity by Danse Macabre. Contemporary composers Pyotr Ilyich Tchaikovsky and Maurice Ravel praised the piece.

Brian Rees rated the work as the finest of the symphonic poems, praising the composer's melodic gift. On the other hand, Saint-Saëns biographer Stephen Studd described the work as a failure, anti-climactic and the most disappointing of the symphonic poems. Joseph Stevenson gave his appraisal as follows; "As is the case with all of the tone poems Saint-Saëns wrote in the 1870s, Phaéton is concise, dramatic, skillfully drawn, and very entertaining pictorial music. It deserves to be heard in concert much more often." Fallon considered it to be one of the most successful of Saint-Saëns's symphonic poems.

== Recordings ==
Conductor	Orchestra	Recording Date	Formats	Labels	Catalogue ID	References
Piero Coppola	Orchestre de la Société des Concerts du Conservatoire	1930, released 1998	CD / Digital	Lys	LYS 376	
Dimitri Mitropoulos	Philharmonic-Symphony Orchestra Of New York	1951, released 1956, digital remaster 2022	LP / Cassette / CD / Digital	Columbia Records (1956) / Sony Classical Records (2022)	ML 5154 / RCA 19439888252	
Louis Fourestier	L'Orchestre de L'Association des Concerts Colonne	Released 1953, rereleased and remastered in 2021	LP / CD / Digital	(Multiple labels)	Angel 35058 / EMI 585210 / 33CX 1158	
Hans-Jürgen Walther	Philharmonisches Staatsorchester Hamburg	Released 1955	LP	MGM Records	MGM E-3144	
Pierre Dervaux	Orchestre de Paris	1971, released 1972, digital release in 2021	LP / Cassette / Digital	EMI (1972) / Warner Classics (2021)	EMI 2C 069-12045	
Louis de Froment	Orchestra of Radio Luxembourg	Released 1977, rereleased 2021	LP / Digital	Vox Records (1977) / Adora (2021)	QSVBX-5144 / BM318717	
Charles Dutoit	Philharmonia Orchestra	1980, released 1981	LP / CD / Digital	Decca Records	SXL 6975	
Yondani Butt	London Symphony Orchestra	Released 1987	LP / CD	ASV Records	ASV CDDCA 599	
Seiji Ozawa	Orchestre National de France	Released 1987, rereleased 2019	LP / CD / Digital	EMI (1987) / Warner Classics (2019)	EMI CDC 7 47477-2 / WQGC-337	
Christian Badea	Royal Philharmonic Orchestra	Released 1991, digital release 2003	CD / Digital	Telarc	TELARC CD 80274	
Emmanuel Krivine	Orchestre National de Lyon	1992, digital release 2010	CD / Digital	Denon Records	DENON CO 75024	
Ronald Zollman	Basel Symphony Orchestra	Released 1995	CD	Pan Classics	PAN CLASSICS 510078	
Lorin Maazel	Pittsburgh Symphony Orchestra	Released 1996	CD / Digital	Sony Classical Records	SONY CLASSICAL SK 53979	
Yoel Levi	Orchestre national d'Île-de-France	2009, released 2011	CD / Digital	Cascavelle	CASCAVELLE VEL3136	
Neeme Järvi	Royal Scottish National Orchestra	2011, released 2012	CD / Digital	Chandos Records	CHSA 5104	
Marc Soustrot	Malmö Symphony Orchestra	2013, released 2015	CD / Digital	Naxos Records	NAXOS 8.573138	
Jun Märkl	Orchestre National de Lille	2016, released 2017	CD / Digital	Naxos Records	NAXOS 8.573745	
Ivor Bolton	Sinfonieorchester Basel	2021, released 2023	CD / Digital	Prospero Classical	PROSP 0060	
François-Xavier Roth	Les Siècles	2021, released 2023	CD / Digital	Harmonia Mundi	HMM902614.15	
