= Suite algérienne =

1880 musical work by Camille Saint-Saëns

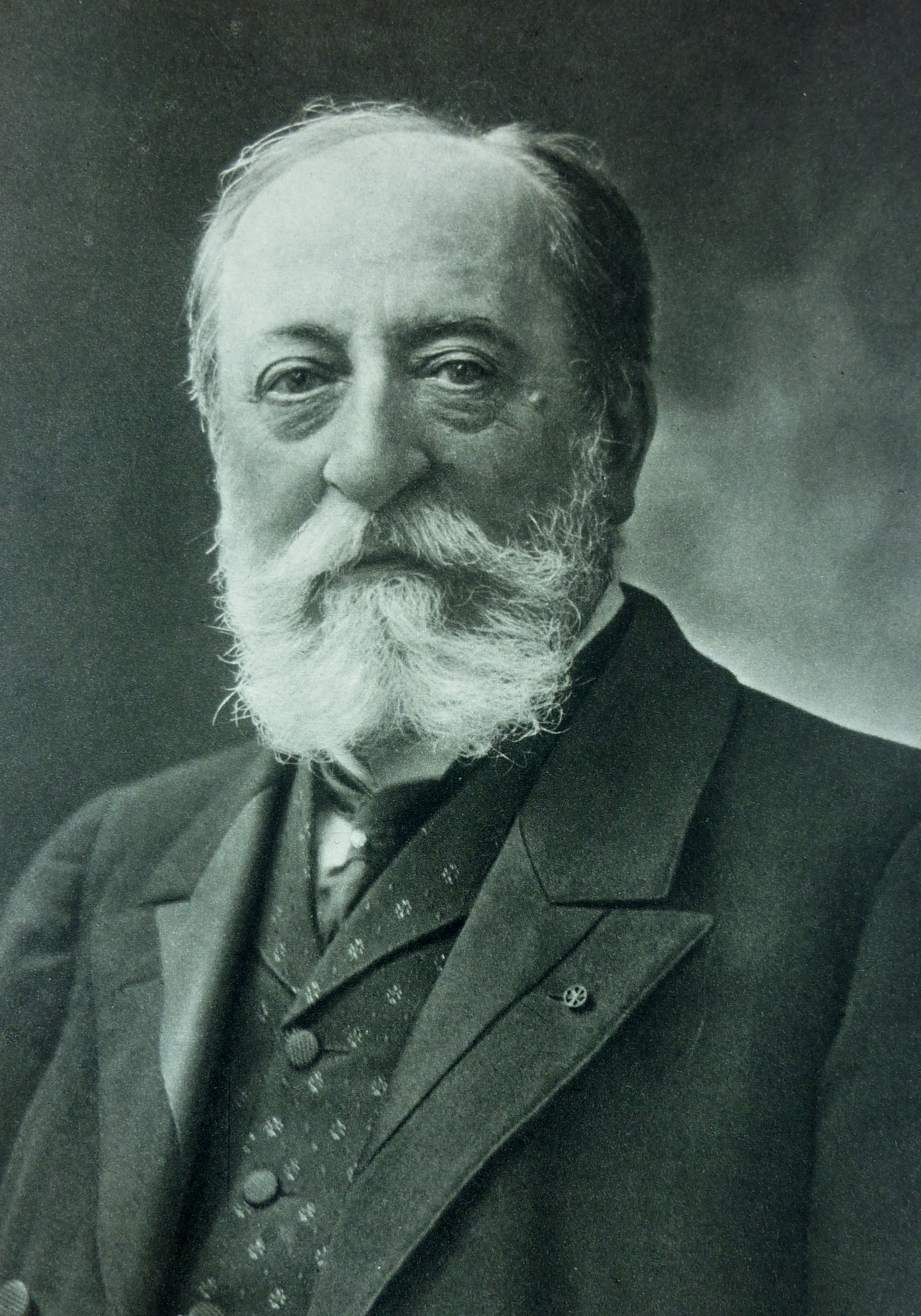
Saint-Saëns photographed by Nadar

The Suite algérienne in C major, Op. 60 is a composition by Camille Saint-Saëns in four movements.

The composer had a lifetime love for Algeria. In 1873, he visited it for the first time. The theme of the third movement of the suite came to him during that visit. He composed a single-movement Rêverie orientale, which was performed in Paris on 7 June 1879 at a charity concert under composer's direction. His publisher Auguste Durand asked him to write more pieces like this one. So in the summer 1880, which he spent in Boulogne-sur-Mer, Saint-Saëns composed three other movements: on 12 July in a letter to Durand he wrote that he began working on them. By the end of August composition was finished (he reported it in a letter to Durand written on 30 August).

The whole suite had its first performance in Paris on 19 December 1880 with Édouard Colonne as conductor. The audience loved it and the composition was published by Durand, Schoenewerk et Cie. the next year with a dedication to Albert Kopff, an ophthalmologist of Alsatian origin, who became a friend of Saint-Saëns during his stay in Algeria. He was also an excellent pianist and published arrangements of works by Saint-Saëns under pseudonym A. Benfeld.

== Music ==
The work is scored for piccolo, 2 flutes, 2 oboes, 2 clarinets, 2 bassoons, 4 horns (2 natural, 2 valved), 2 trumpets (valved), 2 cornets, 3 trombones, tuba, timpani, snare drum, triangle, tambourine, cymbals, bass drum and strings.

The work is written in four movements. Each of the movements has a program.

1. Prélude. En vue d'Alger. (View of Algiers) – Molto allegro, C major
  Program: Du pont du navire, encore secoué par une longue houle, on découvre le panorama de la ville d'Alger. On perçoit les bruits variés qui se mélangent, et au milieu desquels on distingue le cri "Ali Allah! Mohammed rassoul Allah!". Dans un dernier balancement, le navire s'est ancré au port.
2. Rhapsodie mauresque. (Moorish Rhapsody) – Allegretto non troppo, D major
  Program: Dans un des nombreux cafés maures de la vieille ville, les Arabes se livrent à leurs danses coutumières, tour à tour lascives ou effrénées, aux sons des flûtes, des rebabs et des tambourins.
3. Rêverie du soir. A Blidah. (An Evening Dream at Blida) – Allegretto quasi andantino, A major
  Program: Sous les palmiers de l'oasis, dans la nuit parfumée, on entend au loin un chant amoureux et le refrain caressant d'une flûte.
4. Marche militaire française. (French military march) – Allegro giocoso, C major
  Program: De retour à Alger. Dans le pittoresque des bazars et des cafés maures, voici que s'entend le pas redoublé d'un régiment français, dont les accents guerriers contrastent avec les rythms bizarres et les mélodies langoureuses de l'Orient.

== Recordings ==
- Saint-Saëns recorded movements 3 & 4 in a piano arrangement.
  - Released on Naxos 8.112054.

=== Complete recordings ===
==== LPs ====
- (1950s) Orchestre national de la radiodiffusion française, Louis Fourestier. — Pathé 33 DTZX 126 Artistique.
- (rel. 1956) L'Orchestre des Concerts Lamoureux, Jean Fournet. — Philips N 00703 R (Minigroove).
  - (rel. 2004) CD reissue: EMI Classics 585210.
- (rel. 1976) Frankenland State Symphony Orchestra, George Barati. — Lyrichord LLST 7103.
- (rel. 1991) Prague Radio Symphony Orchestra, Vladimír Válek - Supraphon 11 0971-1 031.

==== CDs ====
- (rel. 1988) London Symphony Orchestra, Yondani Butt. — ASV Records CDDCA599.
- (rel. 1990) Prague Radio Symphony Orchestra, Vladimír Válek. — Supraphon 11 0971-2.
- (rel. 1994) Orchestre Philharmonique de Monte Carlo, David Robertson. — Valois Records 4688.
- (rec. 1999, rel. 2000) Swiss Italian Orchestra, Francis Travis. — Chandos Records CHAN 9837.
- (rel. 2007) Orchestre Philharmonique de Nice, Marco Guidarini. — Talent Records 106.

=== Arrangements ===
==== For piano 4-hands by Gabriel Faure ====
- (rec. 2004, rel. 2005) Tomas Daukantas and Vilija Poskute. — Ars Produktion 38008.

== Sources ==
- Sabina Teller Ratner (2002). Camille Saint-Saëns, 1835-1921: A Thematic Catalogue of His Complete Works. Oxford University Press. pp. 300–304. ISBN 978-0-19-816320-6.
- Edward Blakeman. Booklet comments on CHAN 9837.
