= Piano Trio No. 2 (Saint-Saëns) =

1892 Piano Trio by Saint-Saëns

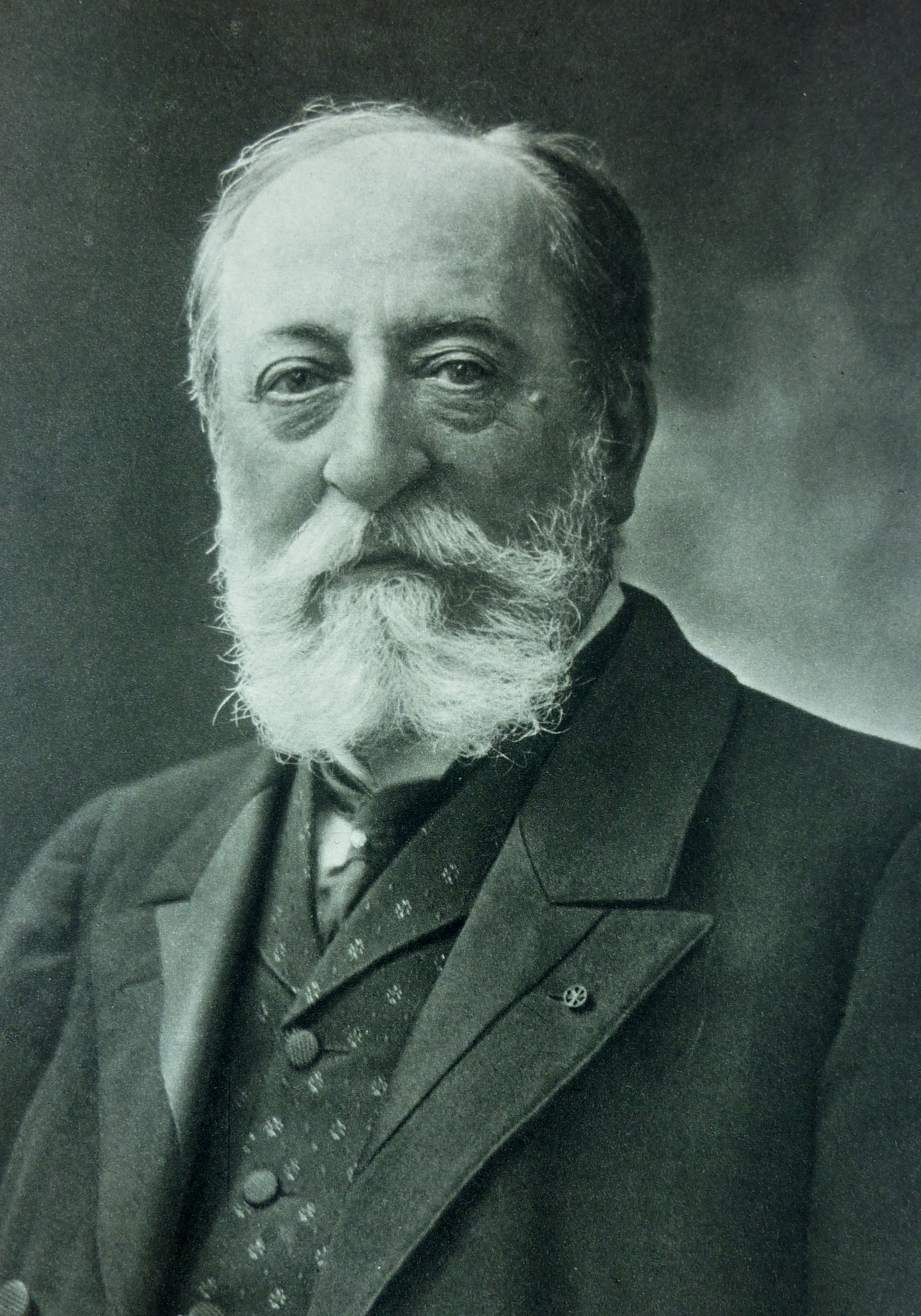
Saint-Saëns photographed by Nadar

The Piano Trio No. 2 in E minor, Op. 92, was composed by Camille Saint-Saëns in 1892. It was premiered on 7 December 1892 at the Salle Érard in Paris, performed by Isidor Philipp, Henri Berthelier and Jules Loeb.

== Structure ==
The work is unusually cast in five movements, and takes around 35 minutes to perform.

1. Allegro ma non-troppo (E minor)
2. Allegretto (E major)
3. Andante con moto (A♭ major)
4. Grazioso, poco allegro (G major)
5. Allegro (E minor)

The first and last movements are considerably longer than the middle three, creating an arch-like structure.

=== I. Allegro ma non-troppo ===
The first movement is a lengthy movement in sonata form. It opens with a dark and ominous theme shared between the violin and cello, accompanied by widely spaced chords in the piano. The second subject presents a new lyrical contrasting theme. After a dramatic development section, the movement ends boldly with an unexpected plagal cadence in E minor.

=== II. Allegretto ===
This movement is a dance-like movement in rondo form, written in 5/8 meter, in a similar vein to the second movement of Tchaikovsky’s Sixth Symphony. It alternates delicate, salon-like music with virtuosic outbursts, ultimately ending softly.

=== III. Andante con moto ===
The third movement is a brief but lyrical slow movement in the distant key of A♭ major. It is built around a small descending phrase first heard in the piano and then in the strings.

=== IV. Grazioso, poco allegretto ===
This movement is a graceful waltz in G major. It opens with a brief dark introduction before the piano introduces the main theme, cheerful in character. Two brief trio sections provide contrast in distant keys.

=== V. Allegro ===
The finale begins with a sinister theme in the piano in octaves, later joined by the strings. The music develops with increasing intensity before reaching a fugato with a theme first announced on the violin. The two themes are then combined and developed in a complex contrapuntal passage. The coda transforms the first theme into a moto perpetuo, which brings the work to a dramatic conclusion in the tonic minor.
