= Paul Fournier =

French legal historian

Paul Fournier (26 November 1853, Calais – 14 May 1935, Paris) was a French legal historian. He was a member of the Institut de France.

== Biography ==
Born in Calais, Paul Fournier obtained a law degree before studying the history of institutions at the École Nationale des Chartes, of which he was graduated in 1879 with a thesis on Officialités au Moyen Âge (Paris, 1880).

Agrégé in 1881, he was appointed professor or Roman law at the University of Grenoble where he would stay thirty three years, becoming dean of the faculty in 1904. He was appointed to the University of Paris in 1914.

In 1911 he was elected a member of the Académie des inscriptions et belles-lettres.

He is best known as a specialist in canon law.

== Selected works ==
- 1886: Un adversaire inconnu de saint Bernard et de Pierre Lombard
- 1887: La questiondes fausses décrétales
- 1894: Une collection canonique italienne du commencement du XIIe siècle
- 1895: La constitution de Léon XIII sur les églises unies d'Orient
- 1901: Étude sur les pénitentiels
- 1904: Un curé lorrain au XVIIIe siècle

== Sources ==
- Bibliothèque de l'École des chartes, 1936, vol. 97, (p. 228–232)
