= Armand Renaud =

French poet (1836–1895)

Armand Renaud (29 July 1836–15 October 1895) was a French poet.

== Life ==
Renaud was born in Versailles. He worked as an official in the Hôtel de Ville, Paris, where for a short time he was a colleague of Léon Valade, and afterwards in the prefecture of the department of the Seine, where he finally became an inspector of the fine arts (inspecteur des beaux-arts).

He was a friend of Stéphane Mallarmé, who brought him into contact with the Parnassian poets, among whom Renaud is now numbered.

Renaud's poems, often influenced by Persian and Japanese poetry, were set to music by Camille Saint-Saëns and Reynaldo Hahn.

He died in Paris and is buried in the Cimetière des Gonards in Versailles.

== Selected works ==
- Les poèmes de l'amour (1860)
- La griffe rose (1862)
- Caprices de boudoir (1864)
- Les pensées tristes (1865)
- Nuits persanes (1870)
- Au bruit du canon (1871)
- L'Héroïsme (1873)
- Idylles japonaises (1880)
- Recueil intime (1881)
- Drames du peuple (1885)

== Sources ==
- Catalogue Opale (BNF)
- Carl A. Barbier: Documents Stéphane Mallarmé. Nizet, Paris 1968/80 (7 vols; for Rebaud, esp. vol. 7)
