= La jeunesse d'Hercule =

Symphonic poem by Camille Saint-Saëns

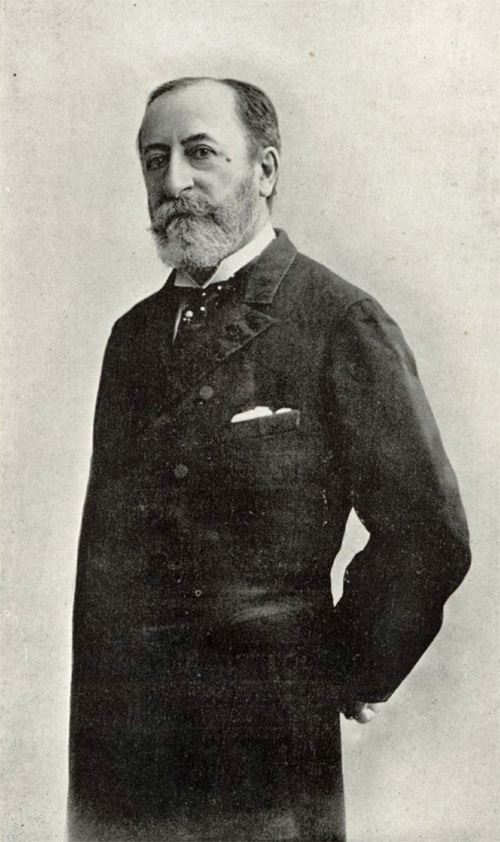
Saint-Saëns c. 1880

La Jeunesse d'Hercule, Op. 50, is a symphonic poem by Camille Saint-Saëns composed in 1876–1877.

== Overview ==
Following Le Rouet d'Omphale, Phaeton, and Danse macabre, La Jeunesse d'Hercule is Saint-Saëns' last symphonic poem, and, like Le Rouet d'Omphale, the score again develops the mythological theme of Hercules.

The composition of the piece was completed on January 6, 1877.

La Jeunesse d'Hercule, dedicated to Henri Duparc, premiered a few days later, on January 28, 1877, at the Théâtre du Châtelet, performed by the Concerts Colonne, conducted by Édouard Colonne.

== Structure ==
The work, with an average performance time of approximately seventeen minutes, comprises a movement of 509 bars, made up of several sections:

- Andante sostenuto (quarter note = 72), then
- Allegro moderato (quarter note = 108), then
- Andantino (dotted quarter note = 63), then
- Allegro (half note = 112).

La Jeunesse d'Hercule bears the opus number 50 and, in the catalogue of the composer's works compiled by the musicologist Sabina Teller Ratner, the number 172.

== Instrumentation ==
The piece is scored for symphony orchestra.

Woodwinds

1 piccolo
2 flutes
2 oboes
2 clarinets
2 bassoons

Brass

4 horns (2 being natural horns)
1 bugle
2 cornets
2 trumpets
3 trombones
1 tubas

Percussion

timpani

triangle
tambourine
drum
cymbals
bass drum

Strings

1 harp

violins I
violins II
violas
violoncellos
double basses

The score was published by Durand in 1877.

Transcriptions were also published for solo piano by Victor Staub (1910), for piano four hands by Ernest Guiraud (1877), for two pianos by the composer himself (1877), for piano four hands with violin and cello ad libitum by Léon Roques (1902), for piano trio (violin, cello, and piano) with double bass and clarinet ad libitum (and additional harmonium part ad libitum) by Roger Branga (1928), for military band by Julien Koszul (1908), for small orchestra by Hubert Mouton (1911), and for orchestra with harmonium ad libitum by Hubert Mouton (1914).

== Analysis ==
=== Programme ===
The programme of the symphonic poem is stated at the beginning of the score:

"The legend recounts that upon entering life, Hercules saw two paths open before him: the path of pleasure and the path of virtue.

"Unmoved by the seductions of the Nymphs and the Bacchantes, the hero embarks on the path of struggles and battles, at the end of which he glimpses, through the flames of the pyre, the reward of immortality."

=== Musical rendering ===
Musically, vice and virtue are thus represented by two distinct, opposing themes: "that of virtue, which primarily calls upon the violin, and that of vice, which calls upon the winds, a dichotomy inherited from that antiquity to which the composer is so passionately attached." After a gentle andante sostenuto introduction, the beautiful first theme rises, allegro moderato, sung by the strings, the second theme employing a much more powerful and rapid dynamic. Then, "a strange orientalizing episode characterizes the entire central section of the work. The return of the two main motifs then leads to a vast coda," a "glorious peroration" and a "vehement denouement reflecting Hercules’s resolve, a resolve that leads him to immortality."

The philosopher and musicologist Vladimir Jankélévitch readily draws parallels between Saint-Saëns’s symphonic poems and those of Liszt, Orpheus or Prometheus, for their "humanism. In fact, the human is at once the archangel slaying the dragon and Apollo slaying the serpent Python, Saint George, as in Raphael's painting, and the knight Bellerophon, and the robust Heracles; the monsters tamed, the roads purged of their brigands, the forests of their giants and the seas of their pirates, the inhuman everywhere begging for mercy".

== Selected recordings ==
- Saint-Saëns: Symphonic Poems, Orchestre national de Lille, Jun Märkl (dir.), Naxos 8.573745, 2017
- Camille Saint-Saëns Edition, CD 3, Orchestre de Paris, Pierre Dervaux (dir.), Warner Classics 0190296746048, 2021

== Sources ==
- Tranchefort, François-René (1996). "Camille Saint-Saëns". In Tranchefort, François-René (ed.). Guide de la musique symphonique. Les Indispensables de la musique (1st, 1986 ed.). Paris: Fayard. p. 663-672. ISBN 2-21301638-0.
- Ratner, Sabina Teller (2002). Camille Saint-Saëns 1835-1921 : A Thematic Catalogue of his Complete Works. Vol. I : The Instrumental Works. Oxford University Press. ISBN 0-19-816320-7.
- de Place, Adélaïde (2003). "Jeunesse d'Hercule, La". In Fauquet, Joël-Marie (ed.). Dictionnaire de la musique en France au XIXe siècle. Fayard. p. 635. ISBN 2-213-59316-7. (BNF 39052242)
- Caron, Jean-Luc; Denizeau, Gérard (2014). Camille Saint-Saëns. horizons. Paris: Bleu nuit éditeur. ISBN 978-2-35884-027-9.
