= Symphony in F major (Saint-Saëns) =

Symphonic work by Camille Saint-Saëns

Symphony in F Major
- Urbs Roma
- by Camille Saint-Saëns
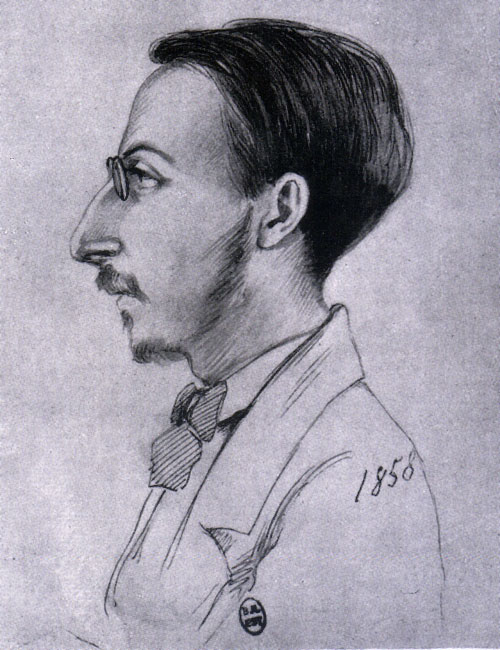
- Key: F Major
- Period: Romantic
- Genre: Symphony
- Composed: 1856
- Published: 1974
- Duration: 40 minutes
- Movements: 4
- Scoring: Symphony Orchestrea

Premiere
- Date: February 15, 1857
- Location: Conservatoire de Paris
- Conductor: Jules Pasdeloup

Symphony in F major, by Camille Saint-Saëns is a symphonic work originally published under the title "Urbs Roma". The symphony was composed in 1856 and premiered the next year at the Conservatoire de Paris under Jules Pasdeloup. It would not see publication until 1974.

== Background ==
The work was originally submitted under the title of "Urbs Roma" (the city of Rome) for a competition in Bordeaux. The competition, which Saint-Saëns won, was intended as a starting point for young composers. The composer did not leave a program or other description that indicates how the music related to its title.

The work was buried by Saint-Saëns, who never published it during his lifetime and left it out of his own catalogue. This resulted in the work never receiving an opus number.

The theme of the slow third movement was reused in the composer's L'Assassinat du duc de Guise.

== Structure ==
The work consists of four movements:

1. Largo – Allegro
2. Molto vivace (A minor)
3. Moderato, assai serioso (F minor)
4. Poco allegretto

== Characteristics ==
The work opens in a slow, somber tone before transitioning to an allegro section. The first movement is constructed unusually, moving twice between Largo and Allegro. This is similar to the construction of Symphony in D Minor by César Franck that was composed 30 years later. The second movement is a scherzo that resembles a spring round dance. The third movement is a funeral march that is described as a "funeral march for the death of an Empire". The final movement is a theme and variations that takes a nostalgic tone and fluctuates between meters.

Symphony in F major is the longest of Saint-Saëns's symphonies, with a total runtime of 40 minutes.
