= Le Rouet d'Omphale =

Camille Saint-Saëns symphonic poem

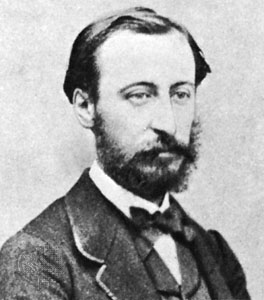
Camille Saint-Saëns in 1875

Le Rouet d'Omphale (The Spinning Wheel of Omphale or Omphale's Spinning Wheel), Op. 31, is a symphonic poem for orchestra, composed by Camille Saint-Saëns in 1871. It is one of the most famous of the four symphonic poems in a mythological series by Saint-Saëns. The other three in the series are Danse macabre, Phaéton, and La jeunesse d'Hercule. The work was printed by Éditions Durand with the dedication 'à Mademoiselle Augusta Holmès'.

== Premise ==
Apollo condemns Hercules to serve Omphale while disguised as a woman: While wearing woman's dress, Hercules slaves for three years spinning wool for her on a spinning wheel.

== Analysis ==
The piece has contrasting sections, and features an imitation of a spinning wheel, played by the strings and woodwind, which recurs throughout the piece.

== Usage ==
The middle section of Le Rouet d'Omphale was used as the theme music to the 1930s US radio drama, The Shadow.
