= Ferdinand Lemaire =

French librettist and poet

Ferdinand Lemaire (1832–1879) was a French librettist and poet, best known for writing the libretto of Camille Saint-Saëns's opera Samson et Dalila.

Lemaire was a creole, originally from Martinique, and had married a cousin of Saint-Saëns's wife. Saint-Saëns had previously set two of his poems, “Souvenance” and “Tristesse”, for voice and piano. Approached by the composer to write an oratorio on the story of Samson and Delilah, Lemaire agreed, but only if the work was to be an opera.
