= Jules Pasdeloup =

French conductor (1819–1887)

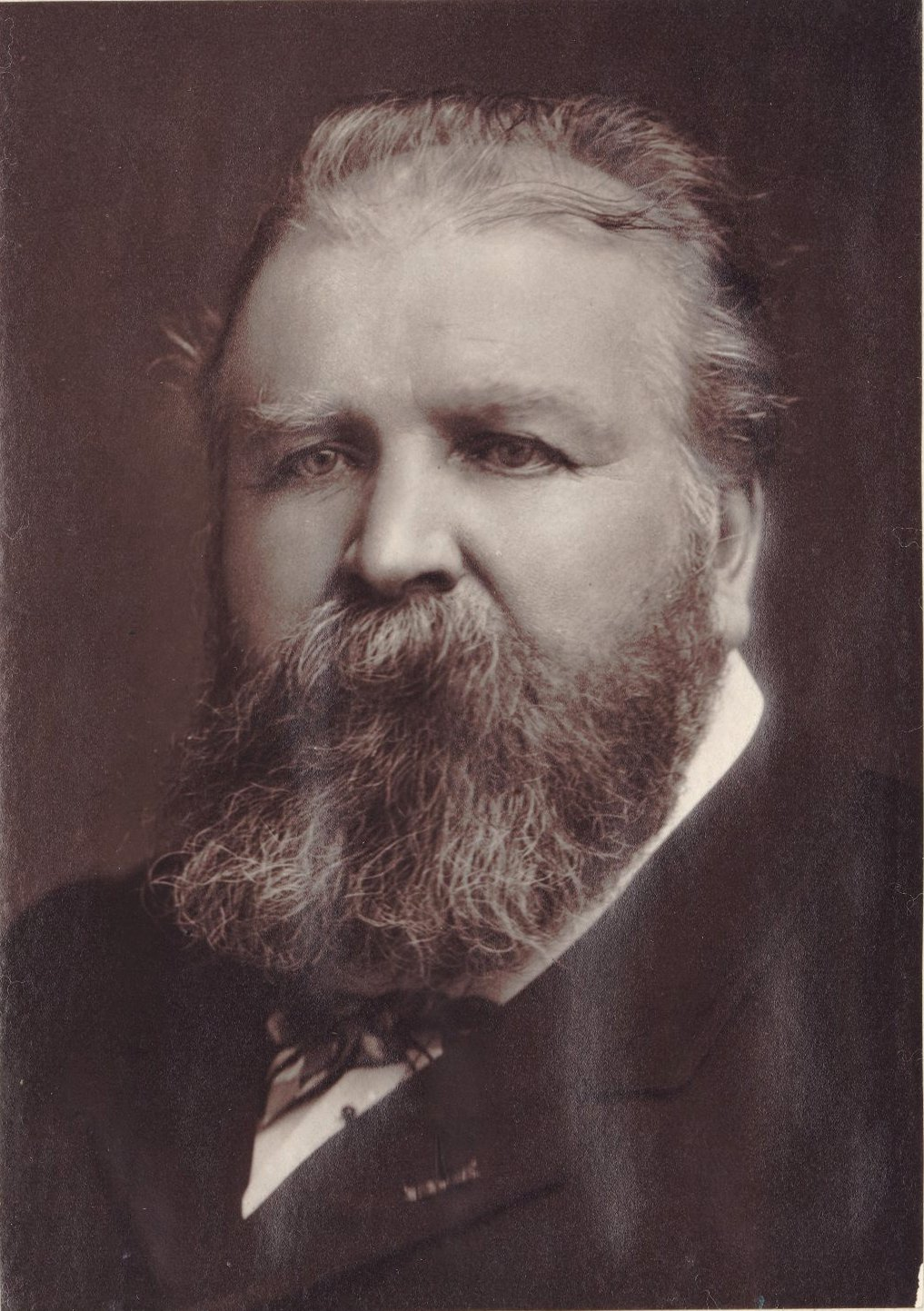
Jules Pasdeloup

Jules Étienne Pasdeloup (French pronunciation: [ʒyl etjɛn padlu]; 15 September 1819 – 13 August 1887) was a French conductor.

== Life ==
Pasdeloup was born in Paris. His father was an assistant conductor at the Opéra Comique; he was educated in music at the Conservatoire de Paris, leaving with a first prize in piano. He founded in 1851 a Société des jeunes artistes du conservatoire that gave concerts in the Salle Hertz for a decade, and, as conductor of its concerts, did much to popularize the best new compositions of the time. His popular Concerts Pasdeloup at the Cirque d'hiver, Paris, from 1861 until 1884, had also a great effect in promoting French taste in music, introducing works by Wagner and Schumann, as well as reviving public interest in the symphonies of Mozart, Haydn, and Beethoven. In 1868 he founded the Société des Oratorios to present oratorios, and joined the Théâtre Lyrique the same year, though he was disappointed there at his lack of popular success in reviving operas like Gluck's Iphigénie en Tauride. He was made a member of the Légion d'Honneur. He died, aged 67, in Fontainebleau.
