= Symphony No. 1 (Saint-Saëns) =

Symphony No. 1 in E-flat major by Camile Saint-Saëns

- by Camille Saint-Saëns
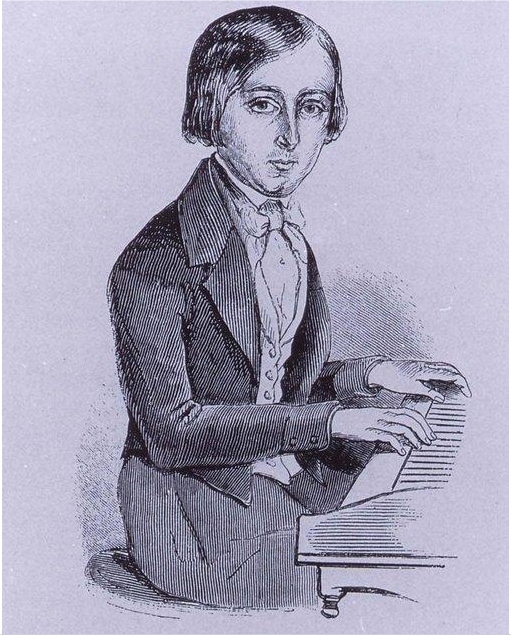
- Key: E♭ major
- Opus: 2
- Period: Romantic
- Genre: Symphony
- Composed: 1853
- Movements: 4
- Scoring: Symphony Orchestra

Premiere
- Date: December 18, 1853
- Location: Société de Sainte-Cécile, Paris
- Conductor: François Seghers

Symphony No. 1 in E♭ major, Op. 2, by Camille Saint-Saëns is a symphonic work composed in June and July 1853 and premiered in Paris the same year.

== Background ==
The work was composed by an 18-year-old Saint-Saëns who initially published it anonymously. The work's scoring for a large orchestra led the premier conductor, François Seghers, to incorrectly speculate that its composer was German. At the work's first rehearsal, Hector Berlioz and Charles Gounod were heard commenting about the composition without realizing that the work's teenage composer sat only feet away.

Several composers have been cited as possible influences on Saint-Saëns. The first movement shows the influence of Schumann, although the development departs from his usual model. The second movement is a march that resembles those of Bizet. The large-scale orchestration is said to resemble that of Beethoven, Berlioz, and Gounod.

== Structure ==
The work consists of four movements:

1. Adagio – Allegro
2. Marche – Scherzo. Allegro scherzando
3. Adagio
4. Finale – Allegro maestoso
