= Serenade in E-flat major (Saint-Saëns) =

1865 composition by Camille Saint-Saëns

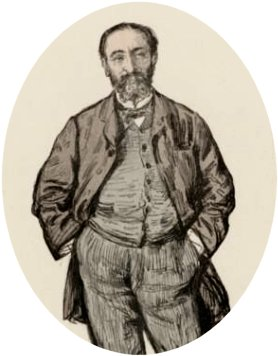
Camille Saint-Saëns in 1875

Camille Saint-Saëns' Serenade in E♭ major, Op. 15 (French: Sérénade en mi bémol majeur) is a chamber composition for a quartet consisting of piano, organ, violin and viola (or cello), composed in 1865. The serenade is one of the earliest works by the composer to make use of an organ (or harmonium) in a chamber ensemble, preceded only by the Six Duos for harmonium and piano, Op. 8. In addition to the original scoring, the work has been transcribed for orchestra, piano solo, piano four-hands, and for piano quartet, with a cello taking the part of the organ.

== Background ==
Composition of the Serenade began in 1865, and was completed by May of that year with publication, dedicated to Princess Mathilde Bonaparte Demidoff who in 1860 had exempted Saint-Saëns from military service, following shortly afterwards. The first performance did not, however, take place until the following year, when it was performed at a soirée held by the Prince of Hohenzollern on 7 January 1866. On that occasion, the organ was played by the composer, while Julian Sauzay played the piano. The Serenade was performed twice more in 1866, the third performance being attended by composers Hector Berlioz, Charles Gounod and Franz Liszt.

== Structure ==
The composition is structured as a single movement, marked Allegretto tranquillo, quasi andantino. The duration of a typical performance is around 6 to 7 minutes.
