= Yondani Butt =

Macau-born conductor (1945–2015)

Yondani Chak Cheung Butt (January 13, 1945 – August 28, 2014) was an orchestral conductor. He was born in Macau of Chinese parentage. He studied music at Indiana University Bloomington and the University of Michigan. He also had a PhD in chemistry, on which subject he has published numerous research papers, particularly on polyene photochemistry. He studied conducting with Wolfgang Vacano (1906–1985) at Indiana University, majoring in chemistry. He continued to study conducting with Josef Blatt (1906–1999) at the University of Michigan while pursuing his chemistry degree.

As founder of Symphonie Canadiana, he led the orchestra on major tours throughout North America. Since 1983, he held the position of resident conductor of the Victoria International Festival, creating the Concerti Extravaganza series, for which he conducted more than 23 concertos in six weeks. Butt recorded and performed in the US, Canada, Latin America, Asia and Europe. He led the Philharmonia Orchestra of London, London Symphony Orchestra, Royal Philharmonic, the American Symphony (with which he performed a Brahms cycle in New York), Hamilton Philharmonic of Canada, Orquesta Sinfónica del Estado de México, Singapore Symphony, Seoul Philharmonic, Japan Gunma Symphony and Het Gelders Orkest, amongst many others. He recorded the Symphony No. 1 by Mahler, Glazunov's Symphony No. 3 through Symphony No. 6, the Saint-Saëns Symphony No. 2, and many more works.

In 1995, Butt received an MRA Gramophone Award in the Symphony category for his recording of Glazunov's Symphony No. 6. He had won the same award in 1986 for his interpretation of Rimsky-Korsakov's Symphony No. 3. His recording of Glazunov's Symphony No. 3 is recognized by the Glazunov Society as definitive, and earned him the title of Honorary Patron of the Society. His extensive discography includes works by Elgar, Glière, Grieg, Kodály, Lalo, Liszt, Mahler, Raff, Saint-Saëns, Sibelius and Richard Strauss. His recording of Goldmark's Rustic Wedding Symphony featured in the classical charts and was a Gramophone Critics’ Choice.

In the early 2000s, Butt suffered damage to his vocal cords, and retired from conducting. However, in 2009 he returned to the podium, working with the London Symphony Orchestra to record many of the Austro-German classics, including Beethoven, Brahms, Schumann and Wagner, as well as works by Tchaikovsky, and a disc of French classics.

Butt was also a composer. He studied free counterpoint and composition with Bernhard Heiden. In Indiana, he studied piano with Sidney Foster, a protégé of Isabelle Vengerova and David Saperton at the Curtis Institute. In Michigan, he studied ensemble with Eugene Bossart (1917–2011) and piano with Karen Keys.

Butt died on August 28, 2014, after a sudden illness while living in China.
