= Symphony in A major (Saint-Saëns) =

Work for orchestra by Camille Saint-Saëns

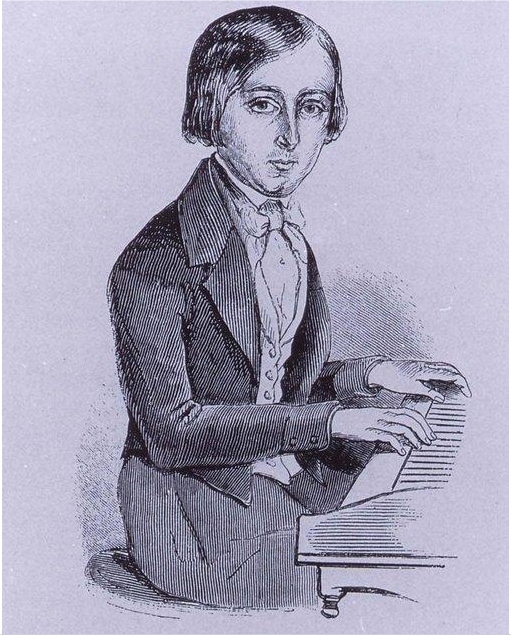
Camille Saint-Saëns in 1846

The Symphony in A major is a work for orchestra by the French composer Camille Saint-Saëns.

== History ==
Saint-Saëns wrote the symphony in 1850 at the age of 15; it is therefore one of his early works. With it, Saint-Saëns turned to absolute music, which, however, was not highly regarded in France at the time.

The work contains obvious influences from the composers Wolfgang Amadeus Mozart and Ludwig van Beethoven.

Today, the work is rarely performed. Of his five symphonies, only the Third ('Organ') Symphony is performed relatively often.

== Instrumentation ==
The symphony is scored for a modest sized orchestra, comprising:

- 2 flutes
- 2 oboes
- 2 clarinets
- 2 bassoons
- 2 horns
- 2 trumpets
- timpani
- strings

== Movements ==
The symphony is, broadly, in four movements:

1. Poco adagio – Allegro vivace (A major)
2. Larghetto (D major)
3. Scherzo vivace (A major)
4. Finale: Allegro molto – Presto (A major)

A typical performance lasts for approximately 25 minutes.

=== I. Poco adagio – Allegro vivace ===
The first movement, in A major and alla breve, begins with a brief, slow introduction in the style of Schubert or Weber before an Allegro vivace, which borrows four notes from the Finale of Mozart's Jupiter Symphony.

=== II. Larghetto ===
The second movement, lent, in D major, is reminiscent of Mendelssohn. Saint-Saëns had attended the Parisian premiere of A Midsummer Night's Dream and always championed the German composer's symphonies. The initial theme reappears three times, each time more ornate.

=== III. Scherzo vivace ===
The third movement, also in D major, alternates between a scherzo and a trio.

=== IV. Finale. Allegro molto – Presto ===
The fourth and final movement returns to the initial key with great energy (the violin part is marked "leggiero, staccato"), borrowing both from Mendelssohn and Berlioz.

== Sources ==
- Mougeot, Philippe (2003). Saint-Saëns: The Five Symphonies, booklet accompanying Jean Martinon (conductor): Saint-Saëns: Les 5 Symphonies, CZS 7 62643 2, Programme notes in French, English. Translated by Barry Millington. EMI Classics.
- Ratner, Sabina Teller (2002). Camille Saint-Saëns, 1835–1922: A Thematic Catalogue of his Complete Works, Volume 1: The Instrumental Works. Oxford: Oxford University Press. ISBN 978-0-19-816320-6.
- Fallon, Daniel Martin. The Symphonies and Symphonic Poems of Camille Saint-Saëns (Doctorate). Yale University. pp. 35–65.
