= Michael Korstick =

German pianist (born 1955)

Michael Korstick (born April 30, 1955 in Cologne, Germany) is a German pianist.

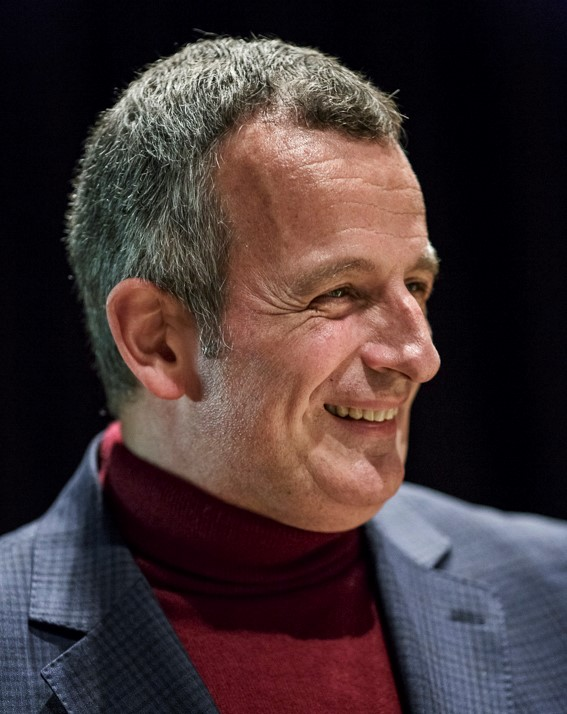
Michael Korstick (2014)

== Life ==
Korstick received his first piano lessons at the age of 9 and was first prize winner of the "Jugend musiziert" competition in Cologne at the age of 11. After graduating from high school he entered the Staatliche Hochschule für Musik in Cologne as a student of Jürgen Tröster, and in 1974 he became a student of Hans Leygraf in Hanover. In the same year he took master classes from the Russian pianist Tatiana Nikolayeva and subsequently worked with her on several occasions. He made his formal concert début in Cologne in 1975, performing Beethoven's sonatas op.106 and op.111.

In 1976 Korstick went to the United States to continue his studies at The Juilliard School in New York City where he was a scholarship student of Sascha Gorodnitzki until 1983. He spent several summers at the Aspen Music Festival and School as a student of Jeaneane Dowis. After winning the Competition of German Music Council, he returned to Germany in 1983 to start his concert career.

Critics have called Korstick "one of the most important Beethoven performers of our time" (Audiophile, Fono Forum). His repertoire consists of more than 120 works for piano and orchestra and a large number of solo works from all periods, including the complete sonatas of Beethoven. On his worldwide concert tours he has given cyclical performances of the piano concerti of Beethoven, Brahms, Liszt, Rachmaninov, Bartók, and Prokofiev.

Korstick has made more than 60 CD recordings so far, among them most notably Beethoven's 32 piano sonatas (the complete edition was released in 2012). He has been the recipient of Germany's Echo Klassik prize in 2005, the MIDEM Classical Award Cannes in 2009, as well as of eight "Awards of the German Record Critics", most recently in August 2025. He was also the recipient of the Special Achievement Award at the International Classical Music Awards (ICMA) 2022.

His 2003 recording of Beethoven's Sonata op.106 ("Hammerklavier") has been the subject of feature articles in Die Zeit and the Süddeutsche Zeitung. Jürgen Otten included him in his 2009 standard work Die großen Pianisten der Gegenwart (The Great Pianists of Our Time) as one of four German pianists. In Ingo Harden and Gregor Willmes' Pianisten Profile (Pianist Profiles) his playing is described to be of "overwhelming intensity".

From 2014 to 2022 he was full professor of piano performance at Anton Bruckner University in Linz, Austria.

== Recordings ==
=== Oehms Classics ===
- 2004 Beethoven: Piano Works Vol. 1 - Diabelli Variations op. 120
- 2005 Beethoven: Piano Sonatas Vol. 2 - Sonatas 1, 2, 3
- 2006 Beethoven: Piano Sonatas Vol. 3 - Sonatas 4, 9, 10, 12
- 2006 Beethoven: Piano Sonatas Vol. 4 - Sonatas 5, 6, 7, 8
- 2007 Beethoven: Piano Sonatas Vol. 5 - Sonatas 11, 19, 20, 13, 14
- 2007 Beethoven: Piano Sonatas Vol. 6 - Sonatas 15, Variations op. 34, op. 35
- 2008 Beethoven: Piano Sonatas Vol. 7 - Sonatas 16, 17, 18
- 2008 Beethoven: Piano Sonatas Vol. 8 - Sonatas 21, 22, 23
- 2008 Beethoven: Piano Sonatas Vol. 9 - Sonatas 24, 25, 26, 27, 28
- 2003 Beethoven: Piano Sonatas Vol. 10 - Sonatas 29, Bagatelles op. 126, Rondo op. 129
- 1997 Beethoven: Piano Sonatas Vol. 11 - Sonatas 30, 31, 32
- 2010/1997 Schumann: Kreisleriana op. 16, Arabesque op. 18, Carnaval op. 9
- 2018 Sergei Rachmaninoff: Concerto No. 3 in D minor, op. 30; Variations on a Theme of Corelli, op. 42; Sonata No. 2 in B flat minor, op. 36

=== cpo ===
- 2005 Darius Milhaud: Complete Works for Piano and Orchestra
- 2007 Max Reger: Piano Concerto in F minor, Op. 114, Bach-Busoni: Piano Concerto in D minor BWV 1052
- 2008/1997 Liszt: Années de Pèlerinage I "Suisse", Sonata in B-Minor
- 2009 Liszt: Années de Pèlerinage II "Italie"
- 2010 Liszt: Années de Pèlerinage III + Venezia e Napoli
- 2009/2010 Mendelssohn-Bartholdy: Lieder ohne Worte (complete), Variations sérieuses
- 2011 Dmitri Kabalevsky: Piano Concerti No. 1-4, Fantasy after Schubert D940, Rhapsody op. 75
- 2014 Franz Schubert: Piano Sonatas D664, D959, D960 + Moments Musicaux D780; Hungarian Melody D817
- 2015 Liszt: Harmonies Poétiques et Religieuses (complete)
- 2016 Alberto Ginastera: The Piano Music
- 2017 Dmitri Kabalevsky: Complete Piano Sonatas
- 2018 César Franck: Prélude, Choral et Fugue; Prélude, Aria et Final; Violin Sonata arr. by Alfred Cortot for solo piano
- 2020 Dmitry Kabalevsky: Complete Préludes
- 2021 Domenico Scarlatti: 37 Keyboard Sonatas ("The Essential Scarlatti")
- 2022 Ludwig van Beethoven: Piano Concertos 0 - 7
- 2025 Ludwig van Beethoven: Bagatelles & Variations
- 2025 Alberto Ginastera: Piano Quintet op. 29

=== Hänssler Classic ===
- 2007 Charles Koechlin: Piano Works Vol. 1 - "...des jardins enchantés..."
- 2008 Charles Koechlin: Piano Works Vol. 2 - Les Heures persanes op. 65
- 2008 Charles Koechlin: Offrande musicale sur le nom de BACH op. 187
- 2009 Charles Koechlin: Piano Works Vol. 3 - "...des horizons lointains..."
- 2011 Claude Debussy: Piano Music Vol. 1
- 2012 Claude Debussy: Piano Music Vol. 2
- 2013 Claude Debussy: Piano Music Vol. 3
- 2015 Claude Debussy: Piano Music Vol. 4
- 2018 Claude Debussy: Piano Music Vol. 5
- 2024 Johannes Brahms: Piano Concertos 1 & 2

=== Gramola ===
- 2013 Richard Strauss: Sonata for Violin & Piano op.18
- 2014 Iván Erőd: Sonatas for Violin & Piano
- 2014 Beethoven: Sonatas for Piano & Violin Vol.1 - Sonatas No.9,10 (op.47 Kreutzer Sonata + op.96)
- 2015 Beethoven: Sonatas for Piano & Violin Vol.2 - Sonatas No.1,2,3,8 (op.12 No.1-3 + op.30 No.3)
- 2015 Beethoven: Sonatas for Piano & Violin Vol.3 - Sonatas No.4,5 (op.23 + op.24 Spring Sonata)
- 2015 Beethoven: Sonatas for Piano & Violin Vol.4 - Sonatas No.6,7 (op.30 No.1,2)
- 2015/1999 Mussorgsky /Prokofiev /Tschaikowsky /Liapunov: Pictures at an Exhibition
- 2016 Schubert: Complete Piano Trios
- 2017 Beethoven: Triple Concerto op.56
- 2018 Bohuslav Martinů: Concerto for Violin, Piano, and Orchestra
- 2018 Edward Elgar: Sonata for Violin & Piano op.82
- 2023 Sergei Prokofiev: Complete Works for Violin & Piano
- 2024 Jean Sibelius: Works for Violin and piano
- 2025 French Violin Sonatas: Works of Gabriel Fauré, Maurice Ravel, Guillaume Lekeu, Francis Poulenc and Olivier Messiaen
- 2026 Johannes Brahms: The Viola Sonatas, op. 120 (+ Robert Schumann: Märchenbilder, op. 113)
