= Alfred Hoehn =

German editor, pianist and music educator

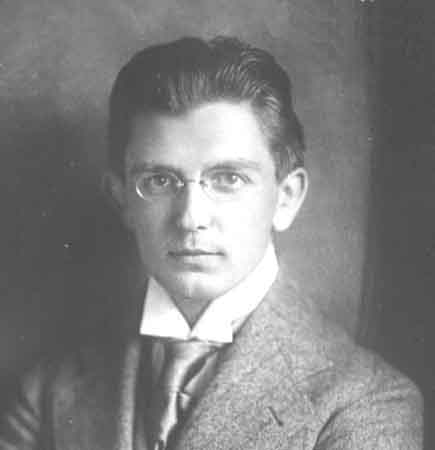
Alfred Hoehn in 1909, at the time of his first European tour.

Alfred Hoehn (20 October 1887 – 2 August 1945) was a German pianist, composer, piano pedagogue and editor.

== Life and career ==
Born in Oberellen, Hoehn was the son of a teacher and organist. He was supported by the pianist Eugen d'Albert, the conductor Fritz Steinbach, Kapellmeister of the Meiningen Court Orchestra, and Georg II, Duke of Saxe-Meiningen, who supported his musical studies. Hoehn learned the basics of piano playing from his father and went to Frankfurt in 1900, where he became a pupil at the Hoch Conservatory at the same time as attending a Realgymnasium. He received his pianistic education from Lazzaro Uzielli, a pupil of Clara Schumann.

After completing his piano studies in 1908, he studied with Fritz Steinbach, who had in the meantime accepted the position of general music director in Cologne and professor at the Hochschule für Musik und Tanz Köln there. He introduced Hoehn to the career of concert pianist in 1908. Besides that, Hoehn pursued studies with Eugen d'Albert and Ferruccio Busoni.

After his European tour in 1909, Hoehn won the Anton Rubinstein Competition in St. Petersburg in 1910 in the presence of Arthur Rubinstein, who in his memoirs reported in detail about this competition and said that Hoehn actually deserved the 1st prize.

Also in 1910 Hoehn was appointed court pianist by the Duke of Meiningen.

As early as 1907 he was given a teaching position at the Hoch Conservatory by director Iwan Knorr, which he held until 1916 and then ended at his own request. In 1913 he took over a master class at the conservatory in Strasbourg which was directed by Hans Pfitzner. In 1929 Hoehn again became a teacher at the Hoch Conservatory and after its partial transformation into the Hochschule für Musik und Darstellende Kunst Frankfurt am Main, he was professor and head of the master class in 1938. In the same function he had already been active since 1933 at the Hochschule für Musik Franz Liszt, Weimar as successor of Bruno Hinze-Reinhold.

He was a juror for the first three International Chopin Piano Competitions.

Hoehn's career was ended in the spring of 1940 by a stroke which he suffered during the rehearsal for the 2nd Piano Concerto by Brahms in the Gewandhaus (Leipzig). As a result, he was paralyzed and died after a long illness on August 2, 1945, in the hospital of Königstein im Taunus at the age of 57.

Hoehn's grave is located at the cemetery in Kronberg im Taunus, his last place of residence. His estate is kept in the Thüringisches Landesmusikarchiv.

== The pianist and teacher ==
In addition to his work as a travelling concert pianist, Hoehn had already devoted himself to pedagogical tasks as a lecturer, private tutor and professor since his student years. Hoehn was not interested in the public dissemination of his ideas. This was especially true for the system of touch (piano), which he advocated and which was not published until after his death, without the consent of the artist during his lifetime. Nothing is known about Hoehn's part in the creation and development of this practice method. His pupil Georg Roth is of the opinion that Hoehn's system is a fusion of ideas that can be traced back to the 19th century (Friedrich Wieck, Clara Schumann, Frédéric Chopin, Franz Liszt) through Hoehn's lessons with Lazzaro Uzielli and the suggestions of Eugen d'Albert and Ferruccio Busoni.

== The composer and editor ==
Alfred Hoehn published a large part of the piano sonatas, sonatines, as well as individual piano pieces and variation works by Ludwig van Beethoven for the Edition Schott. This is an original text, which however does not reach today's standard. Its fingering is in the tradition of older pianism, as can be seen in the editions of Hans von Bülow, Eugen d'Albert, Ferruccio Busoni or Alfred Cortot. This means that the fingering is primarily intended to help adequately represent the musical content of the work of art (articulation, phrasing) and that purely technical questions, such as facilitating difficult passages by means of suitable fingerings or arrangements, are secondary. Modern piano methodology takes a more liberal position here: partial elimination of finger changes for repeated notes, sparing the so-called weak fingers 4 and 5 when other solutions are possible, splitting difficult passages between two hands, and using the pedal already in the fingering arrangement.

== Reception ==
Hoehn was among others teacher of Erik Then-Bergh (1916–1982), Hans Rosbaud and Gisela Sott who said about him:

Hoehn was a first-class artist. He had everything on it—by heart, of course. He came to Hanover in 1933 with Brahms' D minor concerto under Furtwängler. We had been used to the concert up to then in the somewhat relaxed manner of Fischer and Ney, who had no technique at all. And now Hoehn came with this distanced manner, and that was of course a shock. He could do everything without having practiced. But of course he practiced insanely. When he came back from the concert, he was still practicing at night. And then he had a massive stroke. It happened during the second movement of the first Brahms concerto. Afterwards he told me that the keyboard went higher and higher. Afterwards he was paralyzed on the right side and had to give up his great career. The man had won all international competitions. The Rubinstein competition for example. And when Arthur Rubinstein says how beautifully he played the piano, it must mean something.

== Sound documents ==
=== Radio recordings ===
- Johannes Brahms: Klavierkonzert Nr. 1 d-Moll op. 15 (Radio-Symphonieorchester Berlin, Leitung: Max Fiedler). (on CD: Behind the notes: Brahms played by his colleagues and pupils. Arbiter Records 163).
- Johannes Brahms: Klavierkonzert Nr. 2 B-Dur op. 86 (Radioorchester Leipzig, conductor: Reinhold Merten, Aufnahme: 1940). (Auf CD übertragen: Cultural Death: Music under Tyranny. Arbiter Records 162.).
- Peter Tchaikowsky: Klavierkonzert Nr. 1 b-Moll op. 23 (Radio-Symphonieorchester Stuttgart, conductor: Wilhelm Buschkötter).
- Sergej Rachmaninoff: Klavierkonzert Nr. 2 c-Moll op. 18 (conductor: Hans Rosbaud).
- Max Reger: Klavierkonzert f-Moll op. 114 (Frankfurter Rundfunk-Symphonieorchester, conductor: Otto Frickhoeffer).

The recordings are partly in the inventory of the Deutsches Rundfunkarchiv.

=== Recordings on reels ===
System Welte-Mignon
(M. Welte & Söhne, Freiburg im Breisgau)

- Johann Sebastian Bach: Chromatische Fantasie und Fuge d-Moll BWV 903 (Rollennr. 3289, year 1922).
- Ludwig van Beethoven: Klaviersonate Nr. 4 Es-Dur op.7 (Rollennr. 3290/3291, 1920).
- Ludwig van Beethoven: Klaviersonate Nr. 29 B-Dur op. 106 (Rollennr. 3292/93/94, 1922).
- Ludwig van Beethoven: Variationen und Fuge Es-Dur op. 35, Teil 1 (Rollennr. 3296, 1920).
- Felix Mendelssohn Bartholdy: Scherzo a capriccio fis-Moll (Rollennr. 3375, 1920).
- Johannes Brahms: Klaviersonate Nr. 3 f-Moll op.5 (Rollennr. 3297/98/99/3300, 1920).
- Johannes Brahms: Variationen und Fuge über ein Thema von Händel B-Dur op. 24. (R. 3301/02, 1920).
- Jean-Philippe Rameau: Gavotte mit Variationen a-Moll (Rollennr. 3303, 1920).

Phonola
(Ludwig-Hupfeld AG, Leipzig)

- Frédéric Chopin: Nocturne e-Moll op. 72/1 (88 Animatic, Rollennr. 50572).
- Frédéric Chopin: Variationen über das Thema des Rondos Je vends des scapulaires from the opera Ludovic by Hérold and Halévy in B flat major op. 12 (88 Animatic, Rollennr. 50476).
- Antonin Dvořák: Poetische Stimmungsbilder op. 85/12 "Am Heldengrabe" (88 Animatic, Rollennr. 50572).

=== Recordings on discs ===
- Frédéric Chopin: Barcarolle Fis-Dur op. 60 (Parlophone E 10850, Odeon O 9108, American Decca 25177).
- Frédéric Chopin: 2 études (op. 10/12 c-Moll "Revolutionsetüde", op. 25/2 f-Moll) (Parlophone E 10915, Parlophone A 4184, American Decca 25113).
- Domenico Scarlatti: Pastorale (L 413, Arrangement: Carl Tausig) (Parlophone E 10915, American Decca 25113).

== Literature ==
- Georg Roth: Methodik des virtuosen Klavierspiels. Alfred Hoehns Methode. Breitkopf und Härtel. Leipzig, 1949, 2nd edition 1953; extended edition Florian Noetzel, Wilhelmshaven 1995, ISBN 978-3-7959-0683-2.
- Walter Niemann: Meister des Klaviers. Die Pianisten der Gegenwart und der letzten Vergangenheit. 8th edition. Schuster & Löffler, Berlin 1919.
- Hans W. Schmitz: Alfred Hoehn – ein Künstler am Klavier. In Das Mechanische Musikinstrument. Gesellschaft für Selbstspielende Musikinstrumente, Stuttgart. 13. Jg. No. 43 1987.
- Peter Seidle: Alfred Hoehn. In Ingo Harden and Gregor Willmes assisted by Peter Seidle: Pianistenprofile. Bärenreiter-Verlag, Kassel 2008, ISBN 978-3-7618-1616-5. pp. 312–313.
