= Llácer =

Llácer or Llacer is a given name and a surname. Notable people with the name include:

- Àngel Llàcer (born 1974), Spanish actor, television presenter and drama teacher
- Francis Llacer (born 1971), French former professional footballer
- Hector Cabrera Llacer (born 1994), Spanish Paralympic athlete (javelin, shot put, discus)
- José Pérez Llácer (1927–2006), Spanish racing cyclist
- Roel Caboverde Llacer (born 1947), Cuban painter
- Francisco Llácer Pla (1918–2002), Spanish composer and choral conductor
- Enrique Llácer Soler (1934–2024), Spanish jazz and classical percussionist and composer
