= Kim Eun-sun (conductor) =

South Korean conductor (born 1980)

Eun Sun Kim
- 김은선
- Born: October 23, 1980 (age 45); Seoul, South Korea
- Education: Yonsei University, State University of Music and Performing Arts Stuttgart
- Occupation: Conductor
- Employer(s): Houston Grand Opera, San Francisco Opera

Eun Sun Kim (Korean: 김은선; born 23 October 1980) is a South Korean conductor. Kim is music director of the San Francisco Opera.

== Early life ==
The daughter of a former Secretary of South Korea's Ministry of Culture, Sports and Tourism, Kim began to play the piano around age four. Her earliest music interests were in composition. She formally studied music composition at Yonsei University, where her teachers included Seung-Han Choi. Kim was a regular accompanist to singers, and Choi encouraged Kim to develop an interest in conducting. Kim continued her music studies at the State University of Music and Performing Arts Stuttgart.

== Career ==
Following completion of her studies in Stuttgart, Kim was the first prize winner in the 2008 Lopez Cobos International Opera Conductors Competition. She subsequently served as an assistant conductor to Jesús López Cobos at the Teatro Real, Madrid, from 2008 to 2010. Kim has also counted Daniel Barenboim and Kirill Petrenko among her conducting mentors. Kim made her professional conducting debut in 2012 with Oper Frankfurt in a production of La bohème.

Kim made her US conducting debut in September 2017 with the Houston Grand Opera (HGO) in a production of La traviata, in the wake of Hurricane Harvey. Based on this appearance, in May 2018, the HGO announced the appointment of Kim as its next principal guest conductor, effective with the 2019–2020 season, with an initial contract of four seasons. She is the first conductor to be named to this post in 25 years and the first female conductor ever named to this post. Also in May 2018, Kim conducted the opening concert of the Cincinnati May Festival, the first female conductor ever to conduct at the festival.

Kim made her first conducting appearance with the San Francisco Opera in June 2019, in the company's production of Dvořák's Rusalka. In December 2019, the San Francisco Opera announced the appointment of Kim as its next music director, effective August 1, 2021, with an initial contract of five years. She took the title of music director-designate with immediate effect. This appointment marks Kim's first music directorship. Kim is the first female conductor to be named music director of the San Francisco Opera. In October 2024, San Francisco Opera announced the extension of Kim's contract as its music director through the 2030-2031 season.

Cultural offices
| Preceded by Nicola Luisotti | Music Director, San Francisco Opera; 2021–present | Succeeded by incumbent |
