= Fritz Berend =

German English conductor, Music director

- Born: 10 March 1889; Hanover, German Empire
- Died: 29 December 1955 (aged 66); London, England
- Occupations: Conductor, theater and music director, composer, musicologist

Fritz Berend (10 March 1889 – 29 December 1955) was a German, later an English conductor, theater and music director as well as Kapellmeister, composer and musicologist.

== Life ==
=== Early life and education ===
Born in Hanover during the Gründerzeit of the German Empire as scion of a Jewish scholarly family, son of a lawyer and notary and later Privy Councillor of Justice Emil Berend (1846–1920) and his second wife Leonore, née Cohen, Behren grew up in Hanover with three half siblings, including the later literary scholar Eduard Berend (1883–1972). He took his Abitur at the Schillergymnasium there, studied law from 1907, initially for two semesters, but then moved to Munich to the Ludwig-Maximilians-Universität München, where he studied musicology, philosophy and art history under Heinrich Wölfflin, Theodor Lipps and Theodor Kroyer. Under Adolf Sandberger, Berend completed his doctorate at the Ludwig-Maximilians-Universität München in 1913. (Note: Notwithstanding this, the German National Library states the year 1915 as that of Berends' philosophical dissertation at the Ludwig-Maximilians-Universität München.) The title was Nicolaus Adam Strungk 1640–1700. Sein Leben und seine Werke mit Beiträgen zur Geschichte der Musik und des Theaters in Celle, Hannover, Leipzig.

Meanwhile Berend had already received practical music lessons from Emil Blume for violoncello and Heinrich Lutter for piano, and had taken further practical lessons at the Hochschule für Musik und Theater München with August Schmidt-Lindner, Friedrich Klose and Felix Mottl.

=== Career in Germany ===
In 1913, Berend got the position as assistant of Bruno Walter at the National Theatre Munich. In the following year 1914, Berend took up his first position as a theatre Kapellmeister in Freiburg im Breisgau, but this was already interrupted the following year by the war effort in World War I. Berend served from 1915 in the 4th Baden Field Artillery Regiment No. 66, became an officer and was awarded the Iron Cross second and first class as well as the "Baden Order of Merit", before he returned to Freiburg in 1918 and was able to work as a theatre Kapellmeister again until 1920.

From 1922 to 1924, Berend was engaged in Kaiserslautern as Kapellmeister at the Pfalztheater and conducted operas, symphony concerts and oratorio performances there. But still in 1924 he changed to Hagen, where he held the position of head conductor at the local opera house until 1925.

At the beginning of 1926, Berend took over the position of the first Kapellmeister at Theater Osnabrück, in 1931 also that of the Intendant. Due to the Great Depression, a theatrical cooperation with the city of Münster was agreed upon for the 1932/1933 season by "[...] the city fathers" of the two neighbouring cities and Berend was given the direction of both municipal theatres. Although Berend "completely fulfilled the expectations of his spoiled audience", including a performance of Wagner's Die Walküre, shortly after the Nazi's seizure of power the arbitrariness against Berend began: During his vacation he learned from the radio that he had been deposed as Kapellmeister in Osnabrück in favor of a successor who was politically acceptable to the Osnabrück National Socialists. The deposition had been enforced arbitrarily and without any legal basis. Since, however, according to Berend's contract of 16 March 1933, an extension for three seasons had been agreed for the Münster location, the action against Berend initially had no effect in Münster. Meanwhile, however, the party organ National-Zeitung spread malicious allusions to Berend's origins as a so-called "half-Jew": with his dismissal of a Jewish actor he had only wanted to distract from his own origins. Only a few weeks later, on 10 June 1933, Karl-Eugen Heinrich denounced the theatre director to Joseph Goebbels that Berend was "to address him as a Jew according to party official regulations". On 2 July 1933, Berend's descent was verified, and subsequently noted on the index card of the Reichstheaterkammer "fully-Jew" (?).

Although Berend was initially able to work as the first Kapellmeister in Münster, after he had received words of thanks from the "Münsterischer Anzeiger" dated 25 July 1933 "[...] not only [for] the artistic but also the human qualities of the upright front officer", he was dismissed as Intendant in Münster on 28 July 1933 and replaced by Otto Liebscher. In a personal conversation with Goebbels, Liebscher's successor Wilhelm Hanke succeeded in keeping Berend in his post, pointing out that otherwise he would have to close the Münster Theater. The opera ensemble was delighted. But on September 6, 1935, Berend was expelled from the Reichstheaterkammer, but he was able to work in Münster until the summer of 1936, when the decisive objection of the party authorities led to the "Gleichschaltung" of Berend's Theater Berends final dismissal in Münster.

In August 1936, Berend moved to see his aunt in Berlin, where he lived at Yorkstraße 10 until February 1938. During this time he initially looked for a position as a répétiteur, but then joined the Jüdische Künstlerhilfe, where he could work as a conductor, and shortly afterwards also in Breslauer Kulturbund-Orchester. Place of his work in Berlin was the Deutsches Künstlertheater ("Jüdische Künstlertheater").

Then, however, he received a warning from the non-Jewish actress Ilsabe (Ilse Annemarie) Dieck, who lived in Münster, that the Gestapo would make inquiries about the mutual relationship. Berend immediately left Berlin for South Tyrol, where his cousin, who had previously worked as a doctor also in Berlin, had acquired a country estate in Chiusa. Later he moved to Florence, where he – despite the Reichsbürgergesetz (prohibition of work) – carried out various activities to secure his livelihood. He taught music to children of German emigrants in a rural school near Florence, worked as a répétiteur and pianist in concerts, and occasionally gave lectures on music at the British Institute. Because of the violation of the ban on work, he feared the so-called "Sippenhaft" for his siblings who remained in the German Reich, especially after his brother Eduard had been arrested there. Meanwhile, Ilsabe Dieck had repeatedly travelled to the Netherlands to send Berend foreign currency regularly via fake addresses. Later his fiancée suffered a nervous breakdown and followed Berend to Florence.

=== Career in England ===
After Benito Mussolini had also enacted Italian racial laws in the fall of 1938, similar to Adolf Hitler, and Berend was now threatened with persecution and expulsion in Italy as well, the artist left the country by means of a visa after the forced payment of the "Reich Flight Tax" in the amount of 1,917 ℛ︁ℳ︁ – for which he had to sell his concert piano – and reached England on 18 March 1939.

About half a year later he was followed "[...] on household leave" by Ilsabe Dieck, who Berend married in 1940. But even in England the two of them – without work permit – only led a stifling emigrant life. (Note: Notwithstanding this, the Riemann Music Dictionary (see below) mentions one of Berend's activities in London "[...] as opera conductor and music teacher at the University.")

When the Second World War began, the couple were no longer able to travel to the United States as they had wished. So the couple was initially dependent on support from English artists or the Anglican Communion. In addition, Berend founded two orchestras with emigrants, conducted concerts and operas with them, but only for charitable purposes, for example for the Red Cross. He also gave lectures, organized concerts and opera performances in the city of Hampstead and the English province. Berend once found a larger audience when the Landesgruppe deutscher Gewerkschafter in Gross-Britannien celebrated the 25th anniversary of the November Revolution in the middle of the war on 9 November 1943: at the well-attended event with lectures, musical interludes and recitations by Ferdinand Freiligrath and Bertolt Brecht, Berend was able to present the audience with a sonata by Ludwig van Beethoven and his Victory Symphony from Egmont.

Between 1944 and the post-war period of 1951, Berend found a large public as a conductor, especially in London during the matinees of the National Gallery of Art, performing cantatas by Johann Sebastian Bach among others. Meanwhile, Berend had already received news in 1945 that his mother and half-brothers and sisters had been victims of the Holocaust.

Although Berend finally obtained British nationality in 1948, he never found a normal employment again. Although he worked at the Carl Rosa Opera Company from 1951 to 1953, he was only a guest conductor. His last position, from 1953, was only limited to "ability to work", at the Welsh National Opera Company Ltd. in Cardiff once again as music director, but was dismissed at the end of 1954 due to "reduced ability to work". In 1955 Berend's "complete incapacity to work" was determined.

After a new municipal theatre was completed in the course of the German economic miracle in Berend's former place of work in Münster, Berend was invited to conduct the first opera in 1956. However, the invitation did not reach the artist: after suffering from a heart failure in addition to his kidney disease, which had already been diagnosed in 1933, he succumbed to the disease in London at the end of December 1956 aged 66.

An application for indemnity previously submitted by Berend was not processed in Berlin in time before his death.

== Literature ==
- Josef Bergenthal: Theater-Gemeinschaft Münster-Osnabrück. In Das schöne Münster, Heft 22, ed.: Verkehrsamt der Stadt Münster in Verbindung mit dem Verkehrsverein, Münster, 1932
- Werner Röder, Herbert A. Strauss: Biographisches Handbuch der deutschsprachigen Emigration nach 1933. (International biographical dictionary of Central European emigrés 1933–1945), ed.: Institut für Zeitgeschichte, Munich among others: K. G. Saur Verlag, 1983.
- Manfred Kroboth: Ein Dirigent muss ins Exil. Ein Lebensbild des Musikers Fritz Berend, unveröffentlichtes Manuskript, Osnabrück: 1987
- Peter Junk, Martina Sellmeyer: Stationen auf dem Weg nach Auschwitz: Entrechtung, Vertreibung, Vernichtung. Juden in Osnabrück 1900–1945. Ein Gedenkbuch. 2nd edition, Bramsche: Rasch, 1989
- Klaus Hortschansky, Gerd Dethlefs: Musik in Münster. Eine Ausstellung des Stadtmuseums Münster in Zusammenarbeit mit dem Musikwissenschaftlichen Seminar der Westfälischen Wilhelms-Universität Münster vom 22. April bis 31. Juli 1994, ed.: Stadt Münster, Münster: Regensberg, 1994
- Gisela Möllenhoff, Rita Schlautmann-Overmeyer: Jüdische Familien in Münster 1918–1945. 1st edition, published by the city of Münster, Franz-Josef Jakobi, Münster: Westfälisches Dampfboot;
  - Part 1: Biographisches Lexikon, 1995
  - Part 2,1: Abhandlungen und Dokumente 1918–1935, 1998
  - Part 2,2: Abhandlungen und Dokumente 1935–1945, 2001
- Walther Killy, Rudolf Vierhaus (ed.): Deutsche Biographische Enzyklopädie, 1st edition, vol. 1, Munich: Saur, 1995, p. 436
- Christoph Schmidt: Nationalsozialistische Kulturpolitik im Gau Westfalen-Nord. Regionale Strukturen und lokale Milieus (1933–1945). (Forschungen zur Regionalgeschichte, vol. 54), plus Dissertation 2002/2003 at the University of Münster, Paderborn; Munich; Vienna; Zürich: Schöningh, 2006, ISBN 3-506-72983-7

== Archives ==
- Entschädigungsakte Fritz Berend (Aktenzeichen 53.274), Entschädigungsbehörde Berlin, Landesverwaltungsamt für Bürger- und Ordnungsangelegenheiten, Section 1
