= Philippe Bach =

Swiss conductor

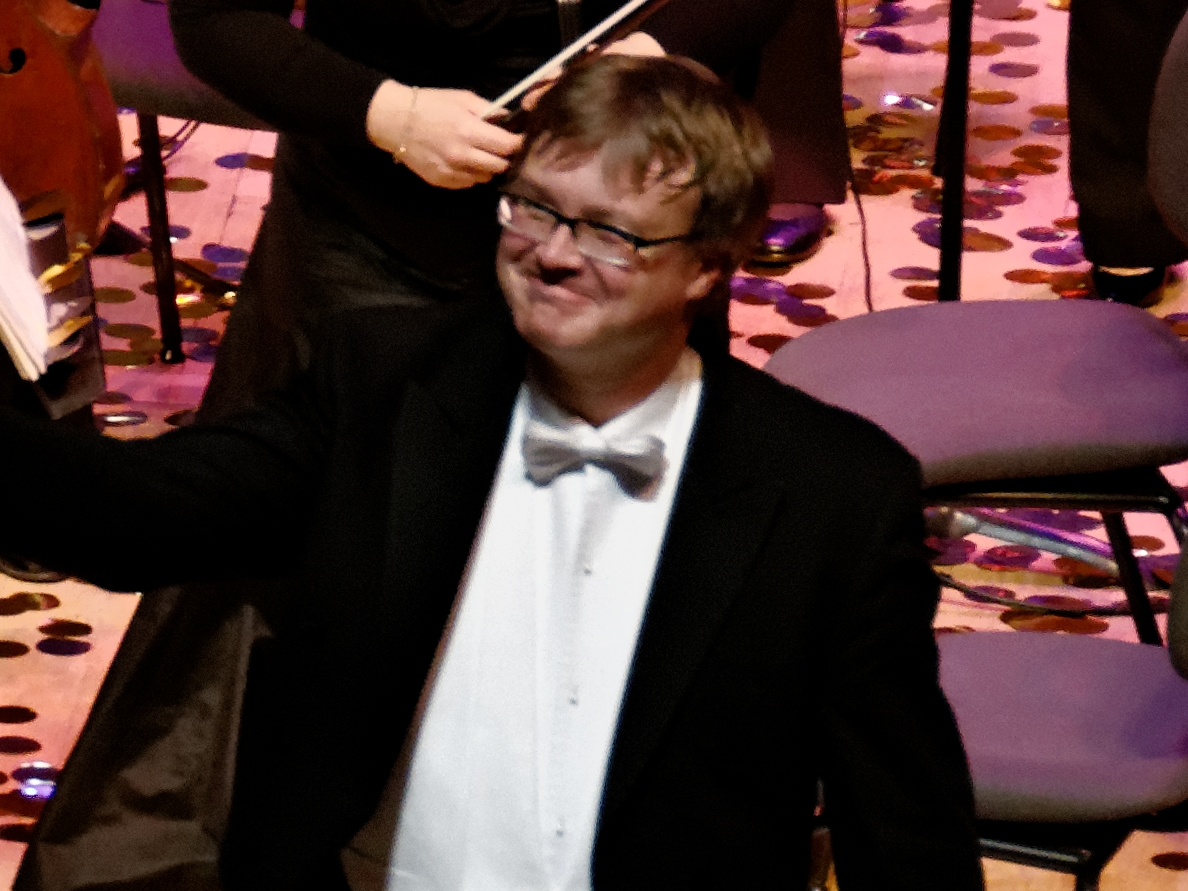
Philippe Bach

Philippe Bach (born 1974) is a Swiss conductor and current music director of Meiningen's Hofkapelle and Theatre.

== Biography ==
Bach was born in Saanen, Switzerland, and studied Horn in Bern and Genève and conducting in Zürich. Philippe Bach was a Junior Fellow in Conducting at the Royal Northern College of Music in Manchester and also attended the American Academy of Conducting at the Aspen Music Festival.

In 2006, Philippe won the first prize of the Lopez Cobos International Opera Conductors Competition and was appointed assistant conductor of the Teatro Real in Madrid.

In 2008 made his début at the Hamburg State Opera conducting Hansel and Gretel and since then has conducted Die Zauberflöte and La traviata there. At the Teatro Real in Madrid he has conducted performances of Madama Butterfly and The Barber of Seville.

In concert he has conducted the Tonhalle Orchester Zurich, Orchestra della Svizzera Italiana, Orquesta Sinfónica de Madrid, Südwestdeutsche Philharmonie, Hallé Orchestra, Royal Liverpool Philharmonic, Orchestre de Chambre de Lausanne, London Symphony (Discovery Scheme), London Philharmonic, Philharmonia (International Conductors’ Academy) and the Bournemouth Symphony Orchestras.

In December 2007 Philippe Bach was appointed first Kapellmeister and Stellvertretender Generalmusikdirektor (Deputy music director) at the Theater Lübeck, where he conducted Rigoletto, Andrea Chénier, Eugene Onegin, Il trovatore, Das Rheingold, and Othmar Schoeck's Penthesilea.

From the 2010/11 season is Bach music director at South Thuringia State Theatre in Meiningen and director of Meiningen Court Orchestra.
