= Heinrich Lutter =

German pianist and piano educator

Heinrich Lutter (13 August 1858 – 11 October 1937) was a German pianist and piano educator.

== Life ==
Lutter was born in the residence of the Kingdom of Hanover as the son of a music teacher. After the proclamation of the German Empire, Lutter studied piano from 1876 to 1886 with Franz Liszt in Weimar and Budapest, and – also in Budapest – musical composition with Robert Volkmann, and finally, again in Hannover, piano with Hans von Bülow. The content of a letter from von Bülow to Lutter in Hanover, dated 18 November 1877 from Glasgow has survived.

Lutter quickly made a name for himself in his home town as a piano teacher, where in 1887 he initiated the "Lutter Concerts" which he then directed. In the highly acclaimed chamber music concerts, played "the best singers, violinists, violoncellists and pianists".

In 1888 Lutter joined the Hannoverscher Künstlerverein. During the respective season in London, Lutter performed as a pianist from 1891 until the beginning of World War I and also gave piano lessons.

Lutter often accompanied Joseph Joachim on concert tours from 1897 to 1906. In 1908, Lutter was appointed professor. The royal professor and court pianist lived at least temporarily in Ferdinandstraße 21.

In 1910, Lutter established the Verein Celler Musikfreundein Celle in cooperation with the musician Theodor Krüger. Lutter died in 1937 in Hanover at the age of 79.

== Honours ==
The Grand Duke of Mecklenburg-Schwerin honoured Lutter with the award of the Medaille für Kunst und Wissenschaft.

== Students ==
- Fritz Berend (1889–1955), German composer, conductor and musicologist.
- Reinhard Schwarz-Schilling (1904–1985), German composer.
- Gisela Sott (1911–2002), German pianist.

== Archives ==
Archive records include:

- der Nachlass Heinrich Lutter in the Stadtbibliothek Hannover:
  - a card box with "[...] notes by Beethoven, Liszt, Mozart, including entries by Lutter, personal papers and notes".

== Literature ==
- Erich Hermann Müller von Asow (ed.): Deutsches Musiker-Lexikon. W. Limpert-Verlag, Dresden 1929, Spalte 872.
- Carl von Lachmund, Alan Walker: Living with Liszt. From the Diary of Carl Lachmund, an American Pupil of Liszt. 1882–1884. (in English: Franz Liszt Studies Series, Vol. 4), revised edition, edited, annotated and introduced by Alan Walker. Pendragon Press, New York 1998, ISBN 0-945193-56-4; passim; Vorschau
