= Carl Friedemann =

German-Swiss composer and conductor (1862–1952)

Kaiser Friedrich Marsch, Op. 66
Kaiser Friedrich Marsch (1888), played by the United States Marine Corps Band, c. 1909

Carl Bert Ulrich Friedemann (29 April 1862 – 9 April 1952) was a German-Swiss composer, conductor and musician. He wrote symphonic music, chamber music, choral works, songs and 140 marches, many of which are still played by marching bands around the world.

== Life and career ==
Friedemann was born in Mücheln at Merseburg, the Province of Saxony in the Kingdom of Prussia. As a child he received lessons for piano and violin. He studied music in Halle (Saale) and with the court conductor Emil Büchner in Erfurt. By 1883 he conducted the orchestra of the Reunion-Theater in Erfurt; he left this appointment in 1885. Meanwhile, he had also learned to play the clarinet. He then joined the band of the 71st (3rd Thuringian) Infantry Regiment in Erfurt and continued his musical training, also appearing as a soloist in local concerts as a violinist and pianist. He also served as conductor of various choirs and choral societies. In 1888 he composed the now famous "Kaiser Friedrich Marsch" as a tribute to the dying German emperor. On November 5, 1890, he passed the military band examination at the Academy of Music in Berlin.

On 20 September 1891, he became conductor of the band of the 113th (5th Baden) Infantry Regiment based in Freiburg im Breisgau. He worked here for 21 years and his fame as a conductor and composer reached beyond national borders. In 1901 he was appointed Royal Kapellmeister in Baden and in 1906 he was appointed Royal Music Director. In January 1912 Friedemann conducted his regimental band at the Café Kropf in Freiburg for his farewell concert. For health reasons he left military music in 1912.

A new commitment was waiting for him in Bern, Switzerland. There he became head of the Bern Town Band, Stadtmusik bern, and raised this wind orchestra to a respectable level. Friedemann made Bern's civic music well-known; he was on the jury of the Federal Music Festival 1906 in Freiburg, which awarded Bern's band the 1st Gold Medal in the first rank of the first city in that category. With this band he made trips to Germany, France, Italy and Spain. When he retired in 1933, he was also made conductor laureate. In 1935 he was appointed Civic Music Professor because of his outstanding service. He also founded his own publishing company there and a music school. Friedemann died in Bern.

== Compositions ==
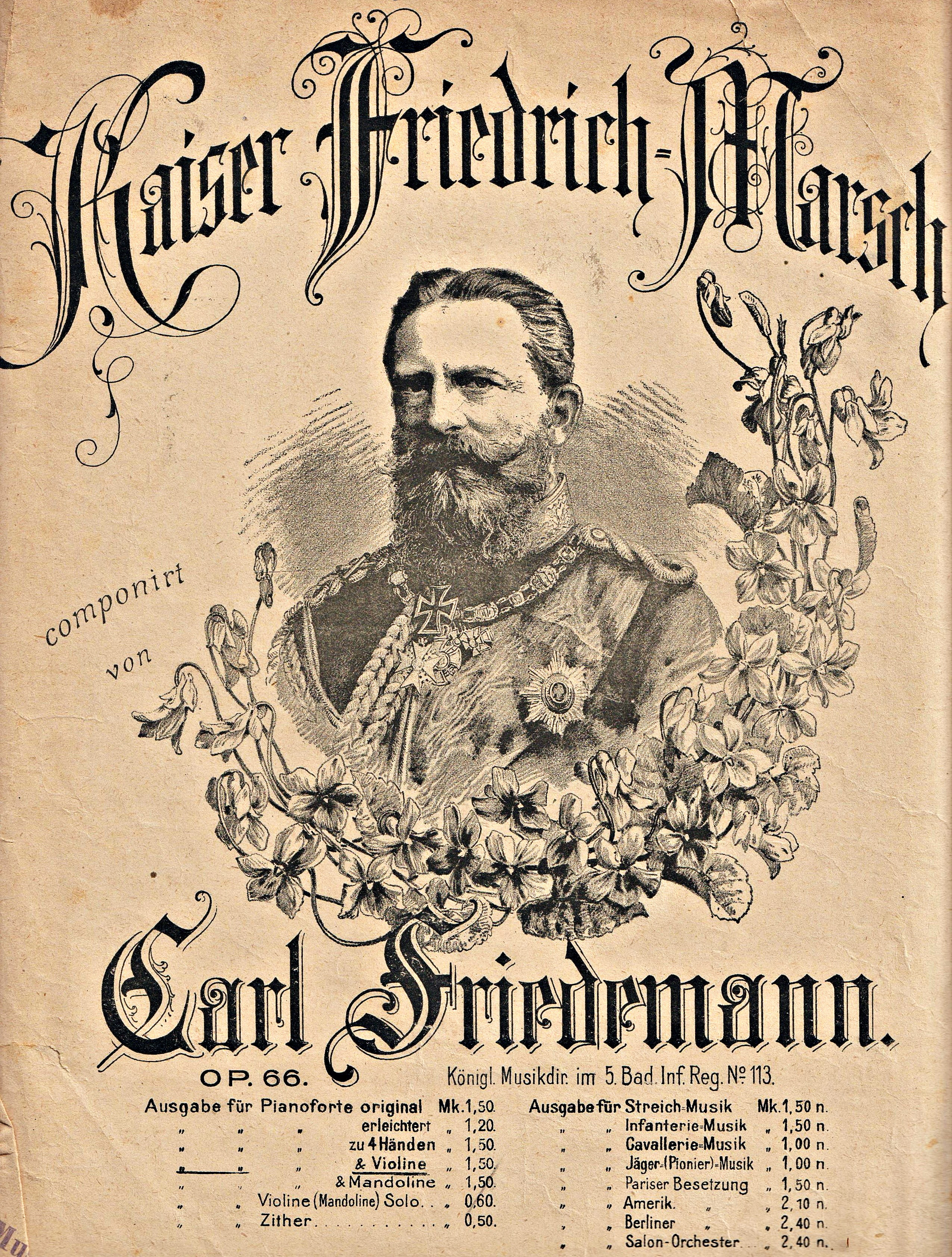
Sheet music for "Kaiser Friedrich Marsch", one of Friedemann's most popular pieces.

- Admiral Marsch
- Attaque de cavallerie: Charakterstück, Op. 145
- Bayrisch blau Marsch
- Concertino, Op. 182
- Ehestandsgeplauder, Op. 54
- Fürst Egon Marsch, Op. 172
- Fürst Max Egon-Fanfare, Op. 152
- Fürstenberg-Fanfare
- Kaiser Friedrich Marsch, Op. 66
- Kaiser-Manöver-Marsch, Op. 81
- Paraphrase on Radecke's Song "Aus der Jugendzeit", Op. 146
- Rhapsody for Violin and Orchestra
- Slavonic Rhapsody No. 1, Op. 114
- Slavonic Rhapsody No. 2, Op. 269
- Slavonic Rhapsody No. 3, Op. 297
- Symphony No. 1
- Symphony No. 2
- Gruss an Bern (March)
