= Medebach =

- Town
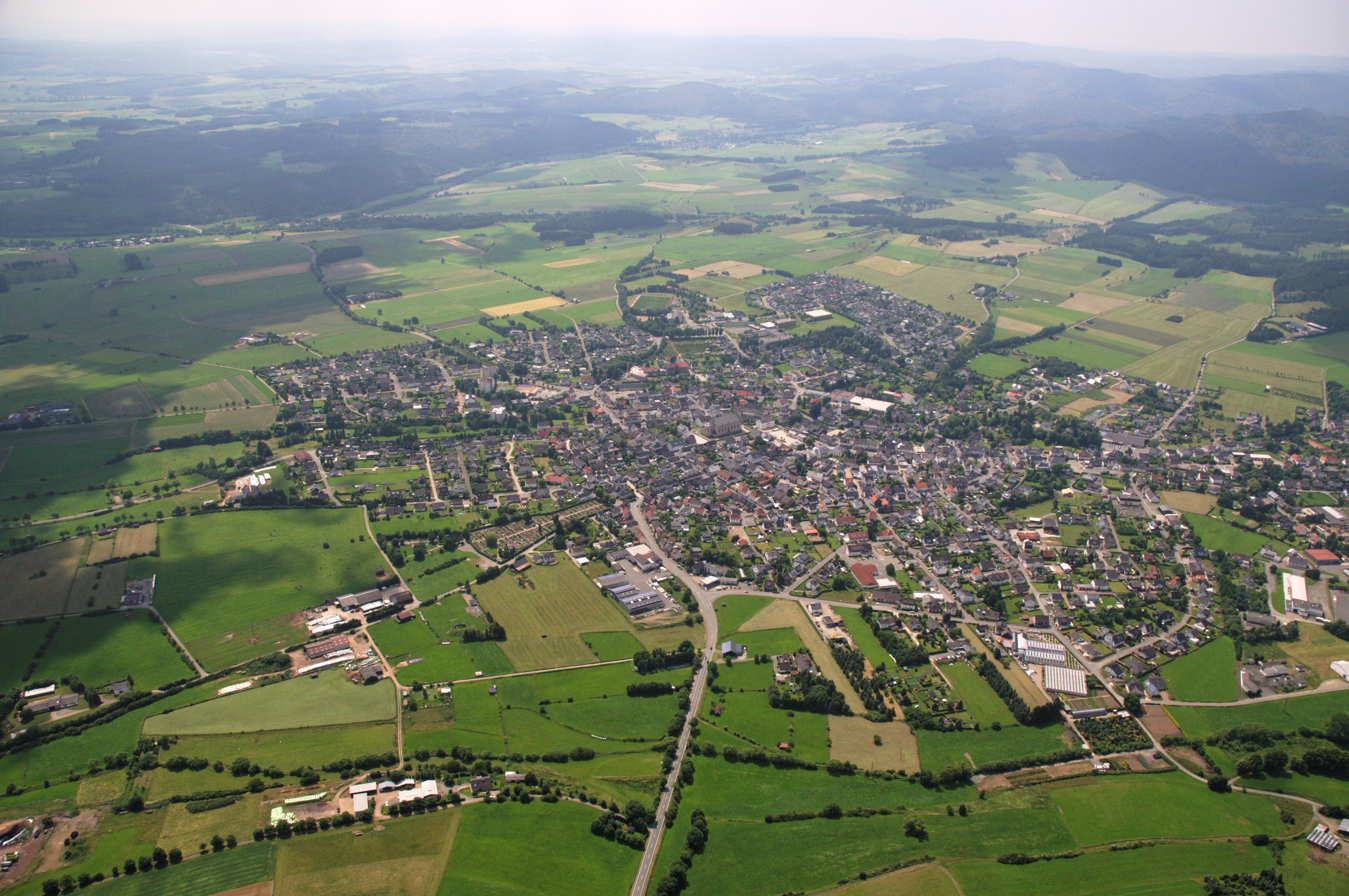

- Flag Coat of arms

- Location of Medebach within Hochsauerlandkreis district
- Interactive map of Medebach
- Location within Germany Location within North Rhine-Westphalia
- Coordinates: 51°11′50″N 8°42′25″E
- Country: Germany
- State: North Rhine-Westphalia
- Admin. region: Arnsberg
- District: Hochsauerlandkreis
- Subdivisions: 10

Government
  - Mayor (2020–25): Thomas Grosche (CDU)

Area
  - Total: 126.05 km^{2} (48.67 sq mi)
- Elevation: 410 m (1,350 ft)

Population (2025-12-31)
  - Total: 7,874
  - Density: 62.47/km^{2} (161.8/sq mi)
- Time zone: UTC+01:00 (CET)
  - Summer (DST): UTC+02:00 (CEST)
- Postal codes: 59964
- Dialling codes: 02982
- Vehicle registration: HSK
- Website: www.medebach.de

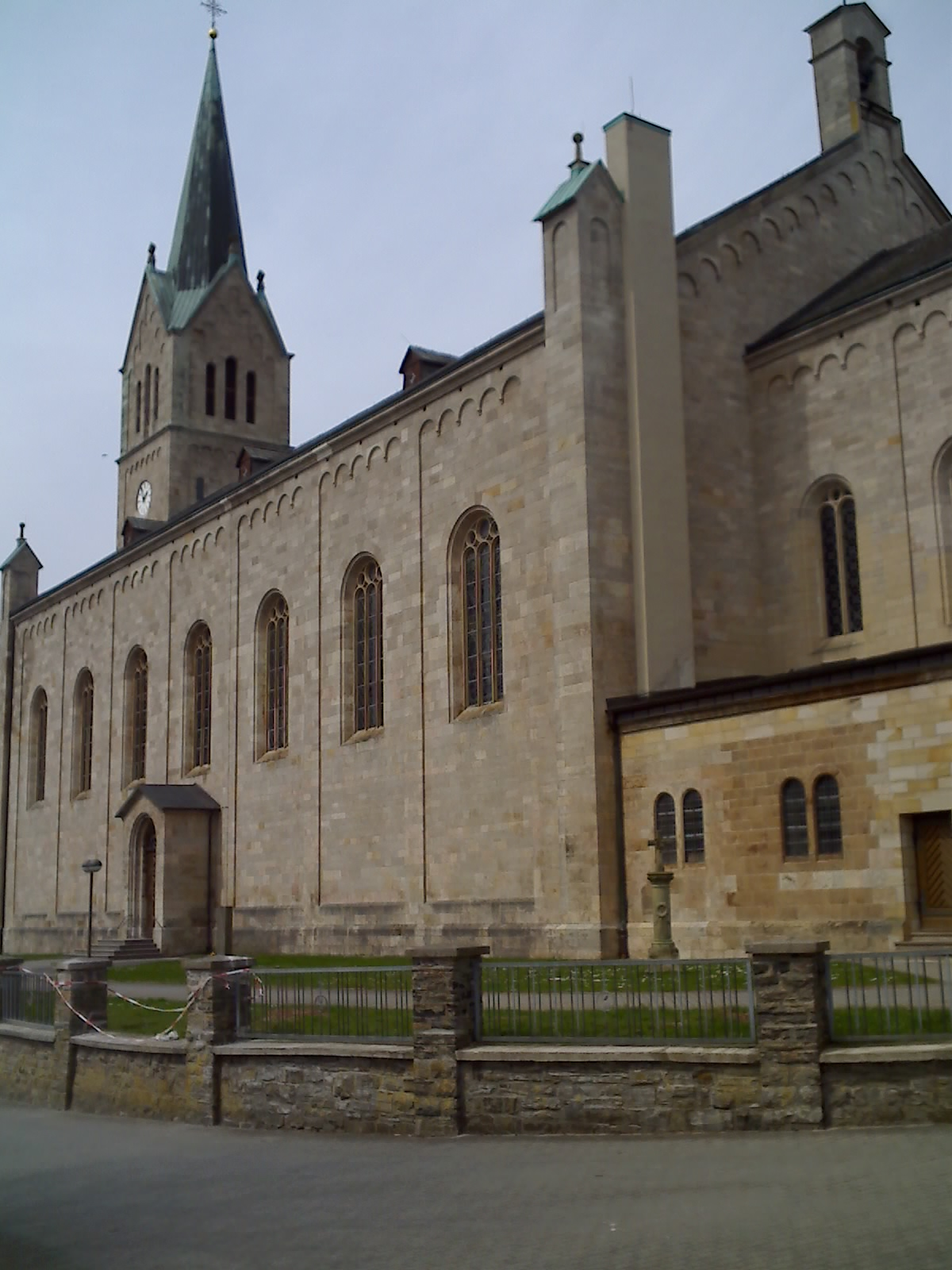
Church

Medebach (German: [ˈmeːdəbax]) is a town in the Hochsauerland district, in North Rhine-Westphalia, Germany.

== Geography ==
Medebach is situated approximately 15 km (9 mi) east of Winterberg, 17 km (11 mi) south-west of Korbach and 45 km (28 mi) north of Marburg.

=== Neighbouring municipalities ===
- Korbach
- Lichtenfels
- Willingen
- Winterberg

=== Division of the town ===
Besides, the town center of Medebach, the municipality consists of the following districts, formerly independent villages:

- Berge with Roninghausen
- Deifeld with Wissinghausen
- Dreislar
- Düdinghausen
- Küstelberg
- Medelon
- Oberschledorn
- Referinghausen
- Titmaringhausen

== History ==
The town was first mentioned in a document in 1144. It belonged to the Hanseatic League.

Medebach and its district Oberschledorn entered the international news in September 2007 during the 2007 bomb plot in Germany, when three Islamic terrorists, two German citizens and a Turk, were arrested there. They had received training in Pakistan and were about to build bombs from hydrogen peroxide in a rented holiday flat.

== Population ==
Historical population

Year	Pop.	±% p.a.
1965	6,833	—
1970	6,994	+0.47%
1975	7,351	+1.00%
1980	7,149	−0.56%
1985	7,138	−0.03%
1990	7,560	+1.16%
1995	8,200	+1.64%

Year	Pop.	±% p.a.
2000	8,356	+0.38%
2005	8,210	−0.35%
2010	7,912	−0.74%
2015	7,938	+0.07%
2020	7,987	+0.12%
2025	7,874	−0.28%

Source: Landesdatabank Nordrhein-Westfalen

== International relations ==
Medebach is twinned with

- Locminé (France)
- Worbis (Germany)

== Notable inhabitants ==
- Henricus de Medebeke, 1347 mayor of Reval
- Caspar Vopel, cartographer, mathematician, astronomer
- Wilhelm Hohoff (1848-1923), Catholic priest
- Hermann Bergenthal, painter, Oberschledorn
- Josef Bergenthal, writer (1900-1982), („Münster steckt voller Merkwürdigkeiten“, 1935), Oberschledorn
- Thomas Seeliger (born 1966), football player
