= Theodor Krüger =

German music educator, choral conductor, pianist and writer (1891–1966)

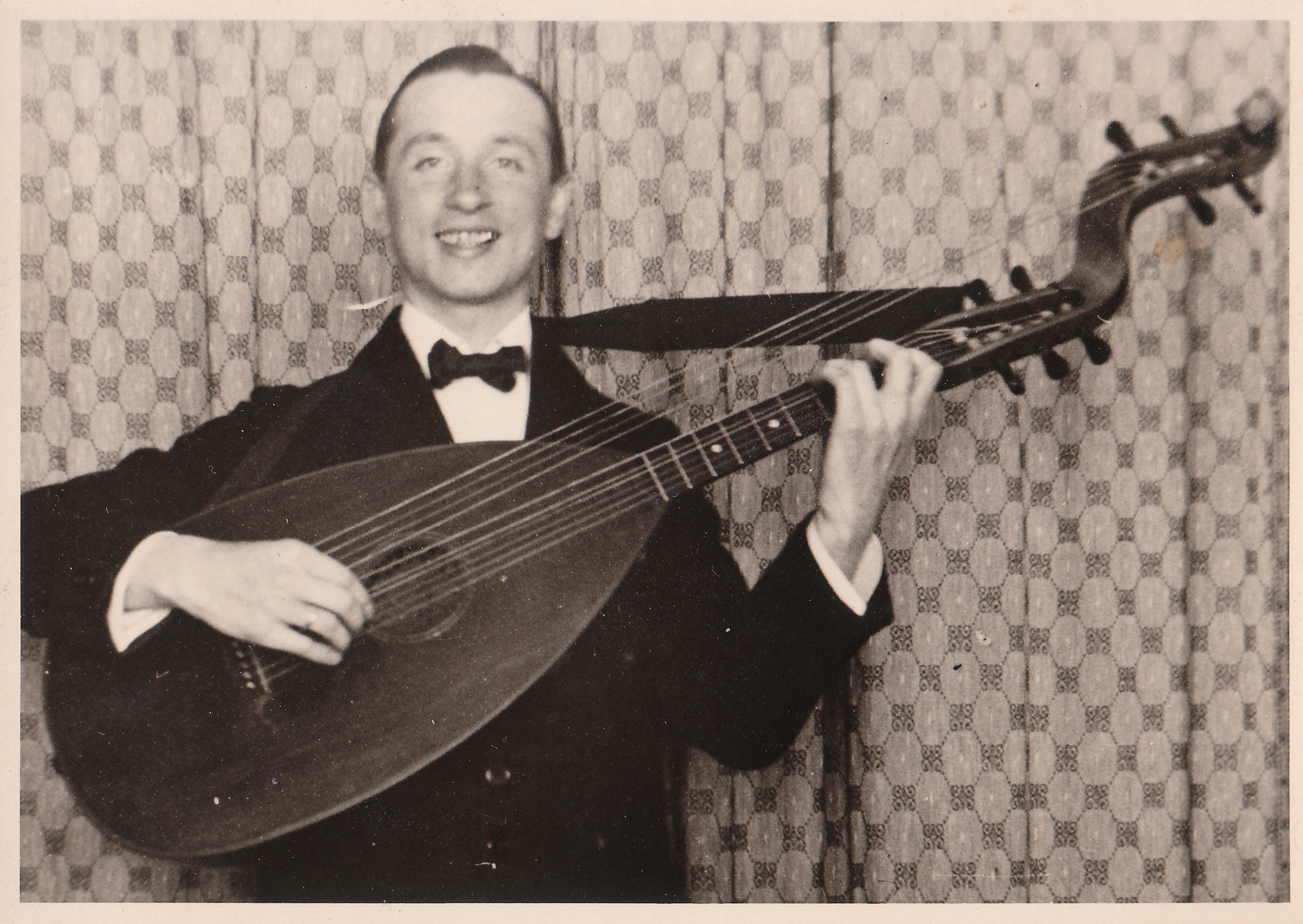
Theodor Krüger with a Deutsche Basslaute (1920)

Theodor Krüger (13 January 1891 – 28 December 1966) was a German music educator, choral conductor, pianist, composer and writer, especially on historical flutes.

== Life ==
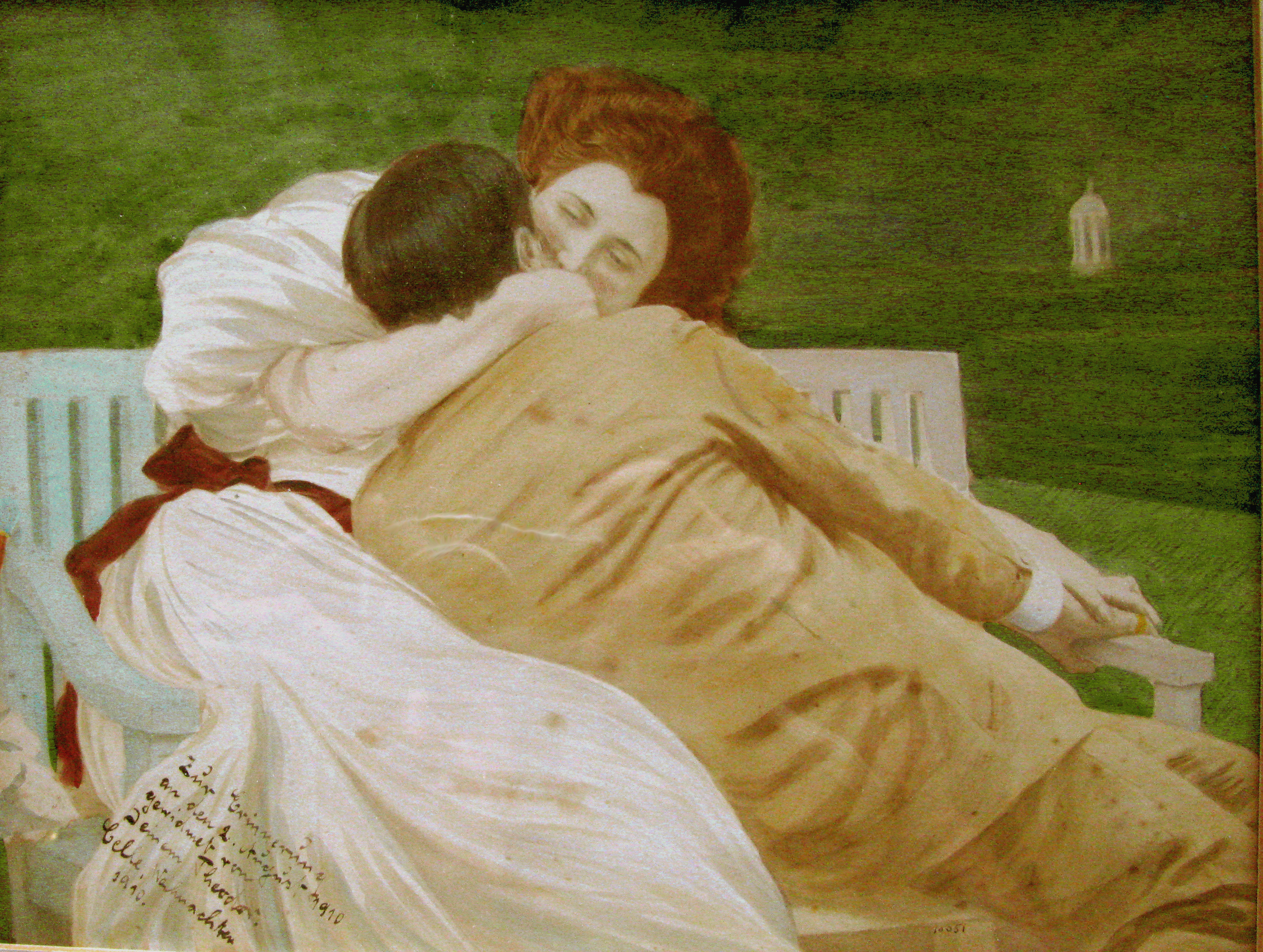
2 August 1910: Krüger with his future wife Marie Suerburg; Watercolored photograph in Jugendstil

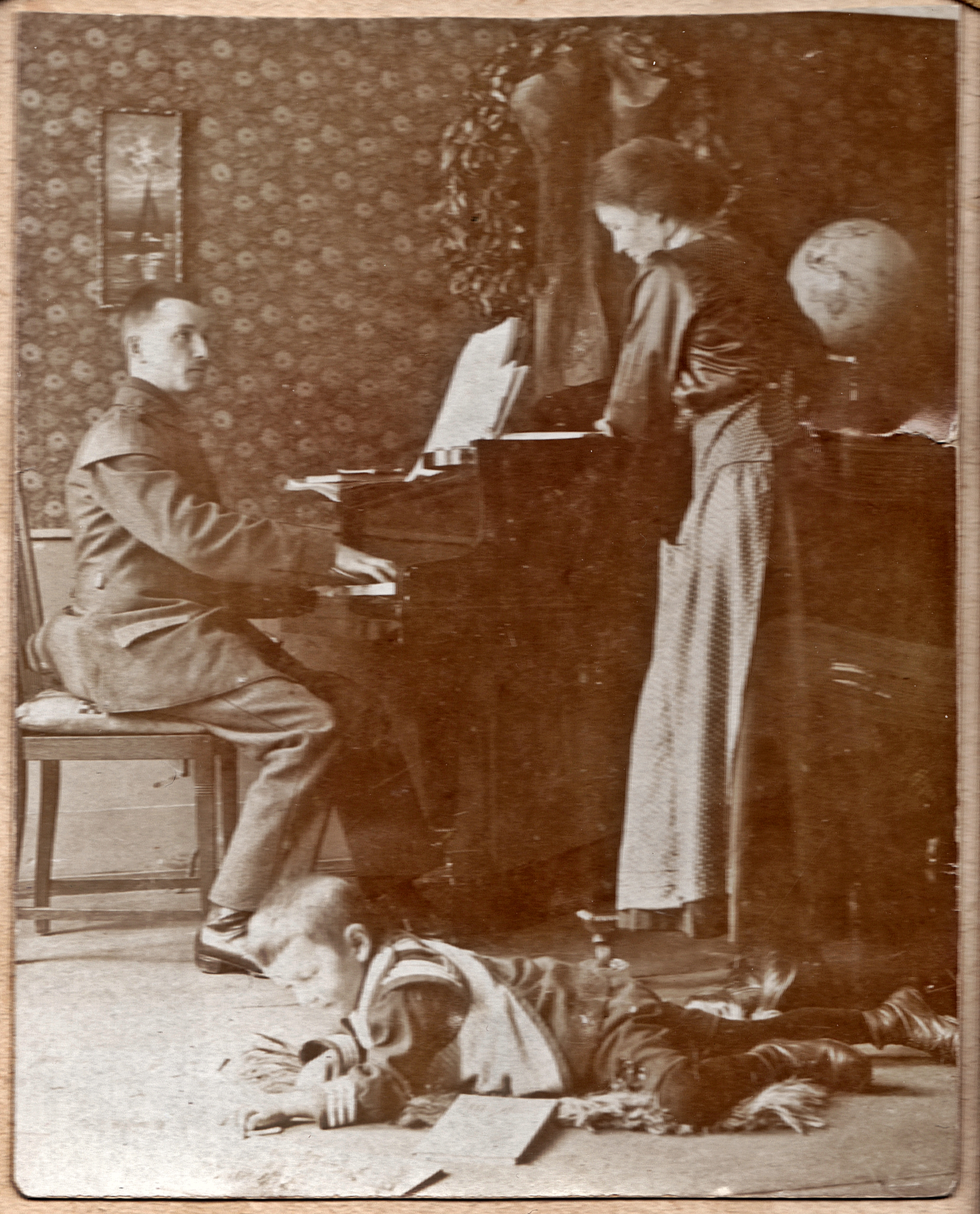
Theodor Krüger at the piano with wife Marie and son Walter during the First World War (1914)

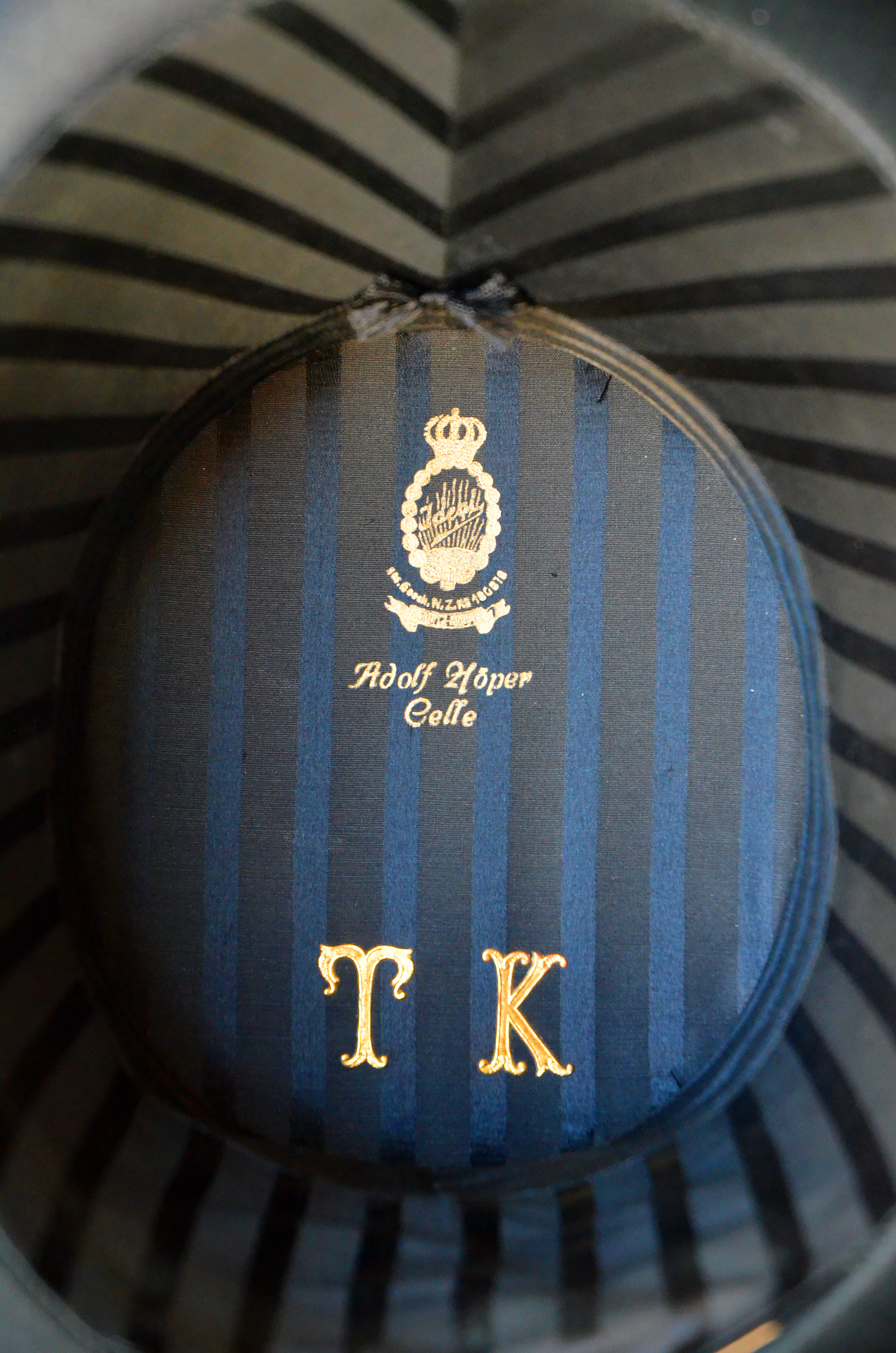
Inner lining of one of the opera hats used by the granddaughter Ilse Paul made by Adolf Höper with the initials T K

Born in Celle, Province of Hanover, Krüger grew up in Celle. Born at the time of the German Empire, Krüger received his first music lessons at the age of 9 from the pianist and flutist Friedrich Ferdinand Theodor Bach, who served in the Celle 2. Hannoversches Infanterie-Regiment Nr. 77 as a musician in martial music. During his training as a pianist at the "Louis-Krohn-Musikschule" in Braunschweig he already wrote his first compositions. In 1910 he returned to Celle, where he continued his studies in piano and theory with Fritz Reichert and Heinrich Lutter, with whom he founded the Verein der Musikfreunde Celle. He acquired his qualification as a choir conductor by studying singing with the concert and oratorio singer Heinrich Kühlborn.

Also in 1910, during the shooting festival in Celle, Krüger met his future wife Marie Suerburg (18 May 1891 in Celle - 2 February 1983 in Metzingen); the two married on 14 August 1914; the couple had two sons: Walter (21 August 1911 in Celle, killed in action 2 October 1941 in Russia) and Hans (4 April 1927 in Celle - 15 July 1986 in Metzingen).

During the First World War he served as a soldier, probably in a chapel, with an unknown place of assignment.

In 1923 he founded the men's double quartet "The Eight". Krüger temporarily took over the direction of the larger Celle male choirs: "Thalia", "Euterpe" and at the time of National Socialism also the male choir "Cellensia", which was a member of the Deutscher Sängerbund. Krüger also became active in other musical areas: He took over the direction of the "1st Celler accordion club of 1936" on 1 February 1937.

In his house Am Heiligen Kreuz 27 in Celle old town, he taught piano, recorder and music theory. Among his students was Hermann Alexander Moeck.

Krüger researched and taught about historical musicology, especially woodwind- and string instruments.

After the Second World War Krüger conducted among others the mixed choir Wathlingen and the "Volkschor Burgdorf".

Krüger died shortly before his 76th birthday. His burial place is situated in the cemetery of Celle.

== Work ==
=== Compositions ===
- Liebkosung (Cajolerie) – Waltz for pianoforte (Miss Marie Surburg in adoration -dedication-), Hannover: Verlag Gries & Schornagel, issue 272
- Deutscher Glaube, Lied für Gesang und Klavier, 1934; Saxonia phonograph record als Pliaphon-Selbstschnittfolie (Unikat "for personal use only"), Dresden: Musikverlag Saxonia, Landhausstraße 11, by letter dated 9 June 1934, postmarked Deutsche Musik-Premieren-Bühne e.V., Schallplatten-Aufnahme-Abteilung
- Celle-Lied (Piano movement; text and Lied by Arnold Breling)
- Gondolièra aràbique – Exotisches Poèm für Klavier

=== Writings ===
- Various writings in "Der Blockflötenspiegel" – Arbeitsblätter zur Belebung historischer Instrumente in der Jugend- und Hausmusik, Verlag Hermann Moeck, Celle:
  - Neue Forderungen zur Wiedergabe alter Musik, Jg. 1931, issue 5, May, pp. 33–39
  - Ein alter Meister (J. H. Schein) stellt sich vor, Jg. 1931, issue 7, July, pp. 72–75
  - Einladung zum Arbeitstreffen für Spieler von Blockflöten und anderen historischen Instrumenten auf der Jugendburg Ludwigstein vom 17.-21. Mai 1932, Jg. 1932, issue 5, (addendum)
  - Die neue Forderung: Faksimile-Drucke alter Meister zum praktischen Gebrauch, Jg. 1932, issue 2, February, pp. 17–23
  - Die Notierung der Tonfarbe, Jg. 1933, issue 11, pp. 21–22

== Nachlass ==
From the Nachlass of the composer and amateur photographer Krüger, for example, several boxes with glass plates-negatives were handed over to the Bomann-Museum in Celle.

== Literature ==
- N.N.: Die Chöre des Krüger-Kreises, in Cellesche Zeitung dated 15 October 1928
- N.N.: Vierzig Jahre Chorarbeit, in Cellesche Zeitung dated 31 March 1950
- Harald Müller (text), Ulrich Loeper (images): Biographisch-bibliographisches Lexikon Celler Musiker. Komponisten, Sänger, Instrumentalmusiker, Musikpädagogen, Musikwissenschaftler, Instrumentenbauer, Glockengießer, Musikverleger, Musikalienhändler und Musiktherapeuten (Celler Beiträge zur Landes- und Kulturgeschichte. Publication series of the Stadtarchiv Celle and the Bomann-Museum of Celle, vol. 31), edited by the city of Celle, 2003, ISBN 3-925902-50-3.
