= Meiningen Court Theatre =

Four-division theater in Thuringian, Meiningen, Germany

Coordinates: 50°34′24″N 10°24′58″E

- Interactive map of Meiningen Court Theatre
- Address: Bernhardstraße 5 Meiningen, Germany

Construction
- Opened: 1831; 195 years ago

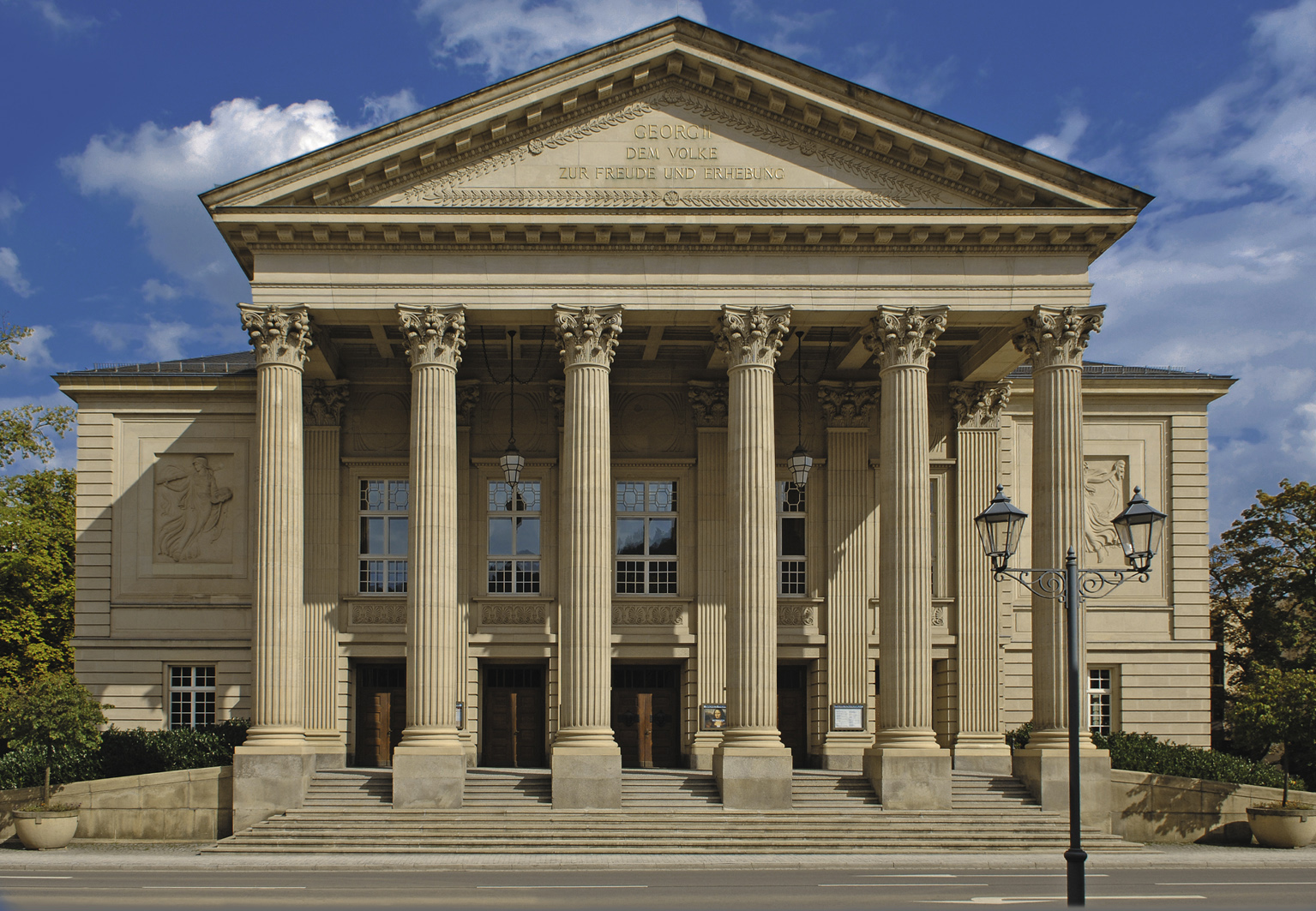
Meiningen Court Theatre, today State Theater Meiningen

The Staatstheater Meiningen (State Theatre Meiningen), also called the Meiningen Theatre, is a four-division theater in the Thuringian town of Meiningen, Germany. The theater was founded in 1831 and was called ″Meininger Hoftheater″ (Meiningen Court Theatre) until 1920.

The theatre offers music theatre (opera, operetta, musicals), drama, concerts and puppet theatre. The programme is further enhanced by the inclusion of ballet performances produced and performed by Landestheater Eisenach. The orchestra affiliated with the theatre is the Meininger Hofkapelle (Meiningen Court Orchestra). Until 2017, the theatre operated as "Südthüringisches Staatstheater" (South Thuringian State Theatre) before changing its name to "Meininger Staatstheater" (Meiningen State Theatre) and 2021 to ″Staatstheater Meiningen″ (State Theatre Meiningen). It is jointly funded by the state, city and county of Schmalkalden-Meiningen under the umbrella of the Cultural Foundation Meiningen-Eisenach, Thuringia.

Meiningen is the birthplace of the modern director's theatre which was famously promoted by the theatre's acting ensemble - dubbed as "Die Meininger" – under the direction of Duke George II during guest appearances throughout Europe in the years 1874 to 1890. They also say: no Hollywood without Meiningen. Between 1880 and 1914, the Meininger Hofkapelle was conducted by Hans von Bülow, Richard Strauss, Wilhelm Berger and Max Reger and as a guest by Johannes Brahms. To this day, this tradition, its history and further successes has secured the Meininger Theater a special place in the theatre world. The theater is so important for the city that Meiningen is also called a "Theaterstadt" (theater city).
