= Meiningen Court Orchestra =

German orchestra

- Orchestra
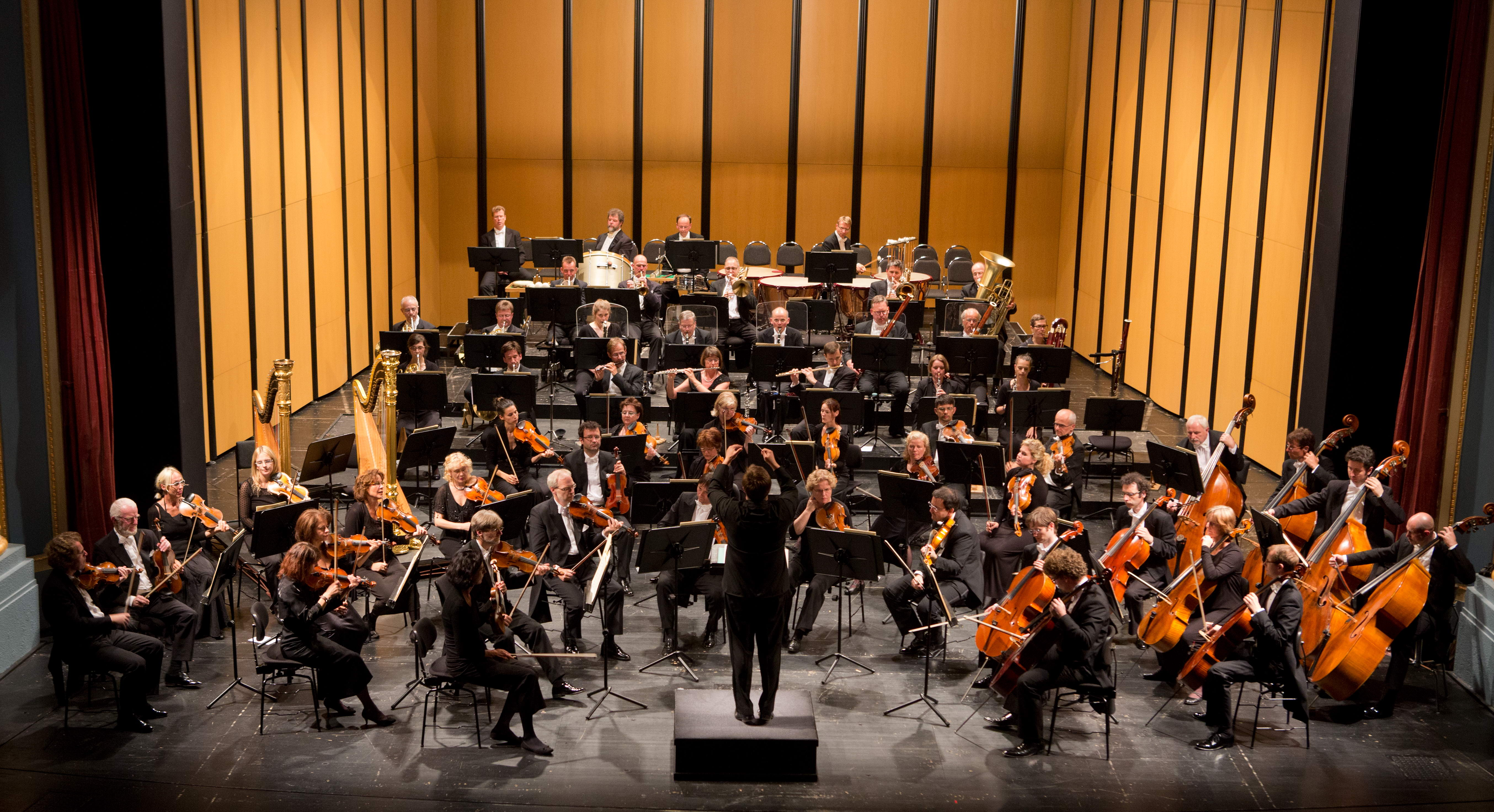
- The Meiningen Court Orchestra and conductor Philippe Bach, July 2013
- Founded: 1690
- Concert hall: Meiningen Court Theatre
- Principal conductor: Killian Farrell
- Website: www.staatstheater-meiningen.de

The Meiningen Court Orchestra (German: Meininger Hofkapelle) is one of Europe's oldest orchestras. Since 1831, the ensemble has been affiliated with the Meiningen Court Theatre, where it regularly performs opera, symphony concerts, and youth concerts. The current music director (GMD) is Killian Farrell.

== History ==
The Saxe-Meiningen ducal court orchestra was founded in 1690 by Duke Bernhard I. After its modest beginnings, the ensemble’s prominence began to grow under the leadership of the Baroque composer Georg Caspar Schürmann from 1702 to 1707. From 1711 to 1731 Johann Ludwig Bach, a second cousin of Johann Sebastian Bach, served as conductor, followed by his relatives Gottlieb Friedrich and Johann Philipp Bach.

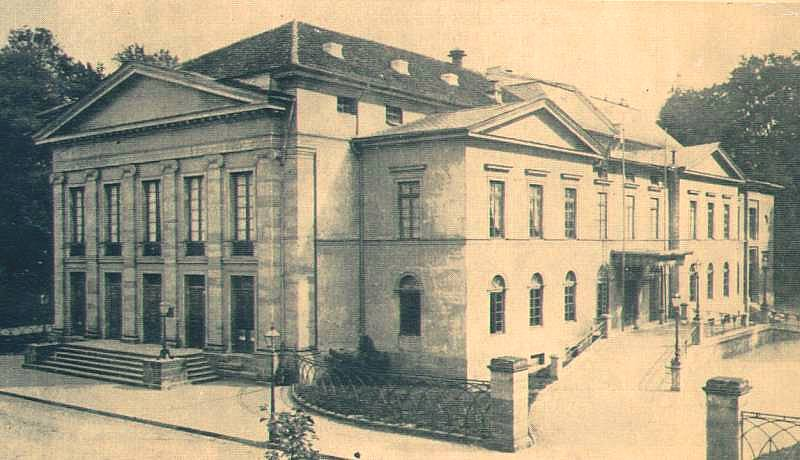
The Meiningen Theatre, rebuilt 1908

In 1867 the Court Orchestra under principal conductor Emil Blücher hosted a festival for the Allgemeiner Deutscher Musikverein (General German Music Association) in collaboration with Franz Liszt in order to promote contemporary composers like Leopold Damrosch, Eduard Lassen, Felix Draeseke, and Robert Volkmann. At Richard Wagner's request, the orchestra performed at the first Bayreuth Festival in 1876.

The orchestra's golden era commenced in October 1880 with Hans von Bülow's appointment as court music director, elevating it to elite status in Europe. Bülow collaborated with Johannes Brahms, who occasionally conducted the ensemble. In a letter to the "theatre duke" George II of Saxe-Meiningen, Brahms expressed his admiration: 'Bülow should know that even the smallest rehearsal in the smallest hall in Meiningen means more to me than any concert in Paris or London, and […] I could sing endless praises about how content and at ease I feel among the orchestra…' His Symphony No. 4 premiered in Meiningen on 25 October 1885 with the composer himself conducting. After Bülow was offered the conductorship of the Berlin Philharmonic Orchestra, the young Richard Strauss briefly served as music director in Meiningen, before being succeeded by Fritz Steinbach and Wilhelm Berger.

== Principal Conductors ==
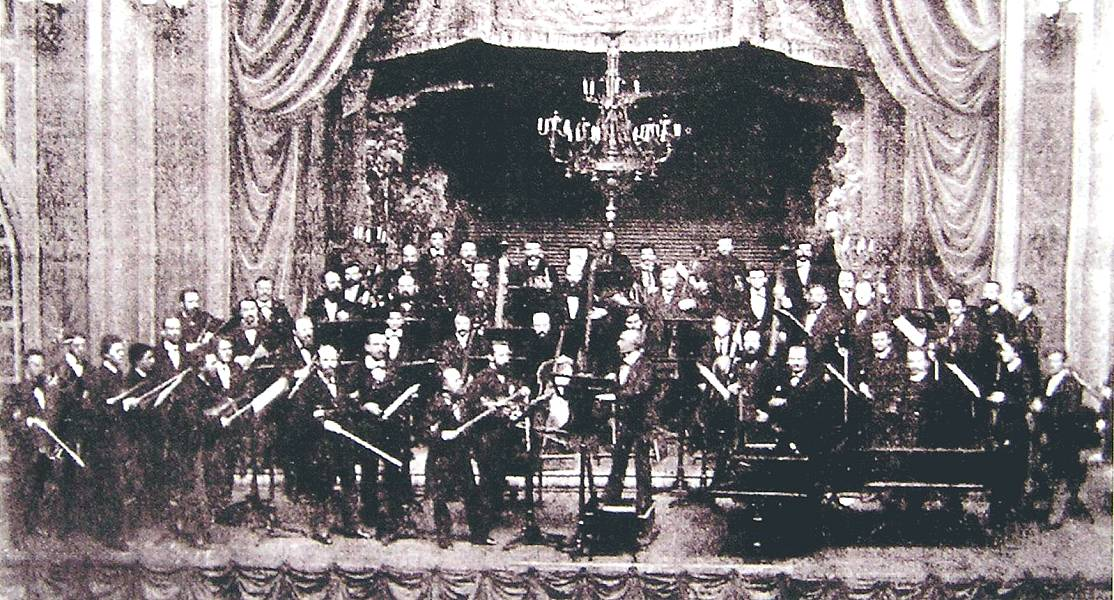
The Meiningen Court Orchestra with Hans von Bülow, 1882

- (1690–1702) Bernhard I of Saxe-Meiningen
- (1702–1707) Georg Caspar Schürmann
- (1711–1731) Johann Ludwig Bach
- (1865–1880) Emil Büchner
- (1880–1885) Hans von Bülow
- (1885–1886) Richard Strauss
- (1886–1903) Fritz Steinbach
- (1903–1911) Wilhelm Berger
- (1911–1914) Max Reger
- (1915–1920) Karl Piening
- (1926–1930) Heinz Bongartz
- (1945–?) Peter Schmitz
- (1956–1961) Rolf Reuter
- (1961–1967) Olaf Koch
- (1967–1995) Wolfgang Hocke
- (1995–1999) Marie-Jeanne Dufour
- (1999–2004) Kirill Petrenko
- (2004-2007) Alan Buribayev
- (2007–2010) Hans Urbanek
- (2010–2022) Philippe Bach
- (2023–present) Killian Farrell

== World Premieres ==
- Brahms: Symphony No. 4 in E minor, Op. 98 (25 October 1885)
- R. Strauss: Suite in B-flat major for Winds, Op. 4 (18 November 1884)

== Notable Instrumentalists ==
- Richard Mühlfeld – Violinist (1873–1876), Principal clarinettist (1876–?)
- Gustav Knoop – Cellist
- Justus Johann Friedrich Dotzauer – Cellist (1801–1805)
- Richard Bruno Heydrich – Double bassist
