= Lopez Cobos International Opera Conductors Competition =

The López-Cobos International Opera Conductors Competition, pioneer in this speciality, was held in the Teatro Real, Madrid in 2006 and 2008. The competitors conducted the Madrid Symphony Orchestra, whose members compose the jury. The first prize brought a two-year contract as Assistant Conductor in the theater.

The second edition grand winner, Eun Sun Kim, became the first woman to conduct in the Teatro Real.

== Winners ==
Year	1st prize	2nd prize	3rd prize
2006	(Switzerland) Philippe Bach	(Japan) Ryuichiro Sonoda	(South Korea) Seungup Yoon
2008	(South Korea) Eun Sun Kim	(Venezuela) Domingo A. Gca. Hindoyan	(Italy) Matteo Pagliari
