= Gisela Sott =

German pianist and piano educator

Gisela Sott (1911 – 6 January 2002) was a German pianist and piano educator.

== Life ==
Born in Hanover, Sott was a student of Heinrich Lutter and (around 1935) Alfred Hoehn at the Hoch Conservatory in Frankfurt. She later became Alfred Hoehn's assistant at the conservatory. In the 1930s and 1940s she was one of the best up-and-coming pianists in Germany, but the war events thwarted a great career. From 1938 she worked as a lecturer at Dr. Hoch's Conservatory. After the war, she continued this activity at the newly founded Frankfurt University of Music and Performing Arts, where she taught, as professor since 1971, until 1982.

Due to a heart condition, Sott had to reduce her concert activity considerably over time, and in 1959 she finally swapped the concert podium for the radio studio. There she made a number of remarkable recordings, including piano concertos by Britten, Tchaikovsky and Scriabin and music by Prokofiev and Strawinsky, which testify to a piano playing that is as differentiated as it is rousingly vital.

Sott's pedagogical legacy is a synthesis of the tradition of Franz Liszt, the playing technique of Alfred Cortot and the system of keystrokes of Alfred Hoehn, which she passed on to numerous students. After her work as a university teacher, the pianist was known in specialist circles for her valuable assistance in mastering technical problems.

Sott died in Frankfurt in 2002.
