= Caspar Vopel =

German cartographer (151--1561)

Caspar Vopel (1511–1561) was a German cartographer and instrument maker. Born in Medebach, he studied mathematics and medicine at the University of Cologne in 1526–1529. He taught mathematics at the Gymnasium of Cologne and in the early 1530s established a workshop to produce celestial and terrestrial globes, armillary spheres, sundials, quadrants and astrolabes. Vopel is sometimes credited with the promotion of the ancient asterism Coma Berenices to constellation status. An exemplar of Vopel’s 1536 globe is held at Tenri University Library, Nara. Vopel’s 1536 globe was copied on the 1552 globe of Jacques de la Garde of Blois, on the globe made by Jean Naze of Lyon in 1560, on Christoph Schniepp’s globe of c.1600, on the 1603 Nicolai Globe and on the Oterschaden globe of similar date. In 1545 he began to prepare maps and atlases. His mappemonde of 1545 is titled NOVA ET INTEGRA VNIVERSALISQVE ORBIS TOTIVS IVXTA GERMANVM NEOTERICORVM TRADITIONEM DESCRIPTIO (A New Complete and Universal Description of the Whole World, according to the Modern German Tradition). An inscription on it describes America and its people drawn from the Mundus Novus:

America, which Americo Vespucci called a New World continent or land; the name was taken from Americo Vespucci, the discoverer of the same; on the other hand, in Castile by choice they call it Terra Firma, and for that reason it is now not undeservedly called the Fourth Part of the World beyond the Equator, where it is observed that the manners of the people, their humanity, the fertility of the soil, temperance of the air and salubrity of the climate testify that they are born in more cultivated regions and more crowded with inhabitants than any other nation, be it in Asia, Europe or Africa, etc. The inhabitants lie with each other promiscuously taking no account of blood relationship and take as many wives as they please; others feed on human flesh, so much so that, it is said, a father feeds upon his children and they in turn upon the parents they are born of, according to the results of chance; and they swim like animals of the sea.

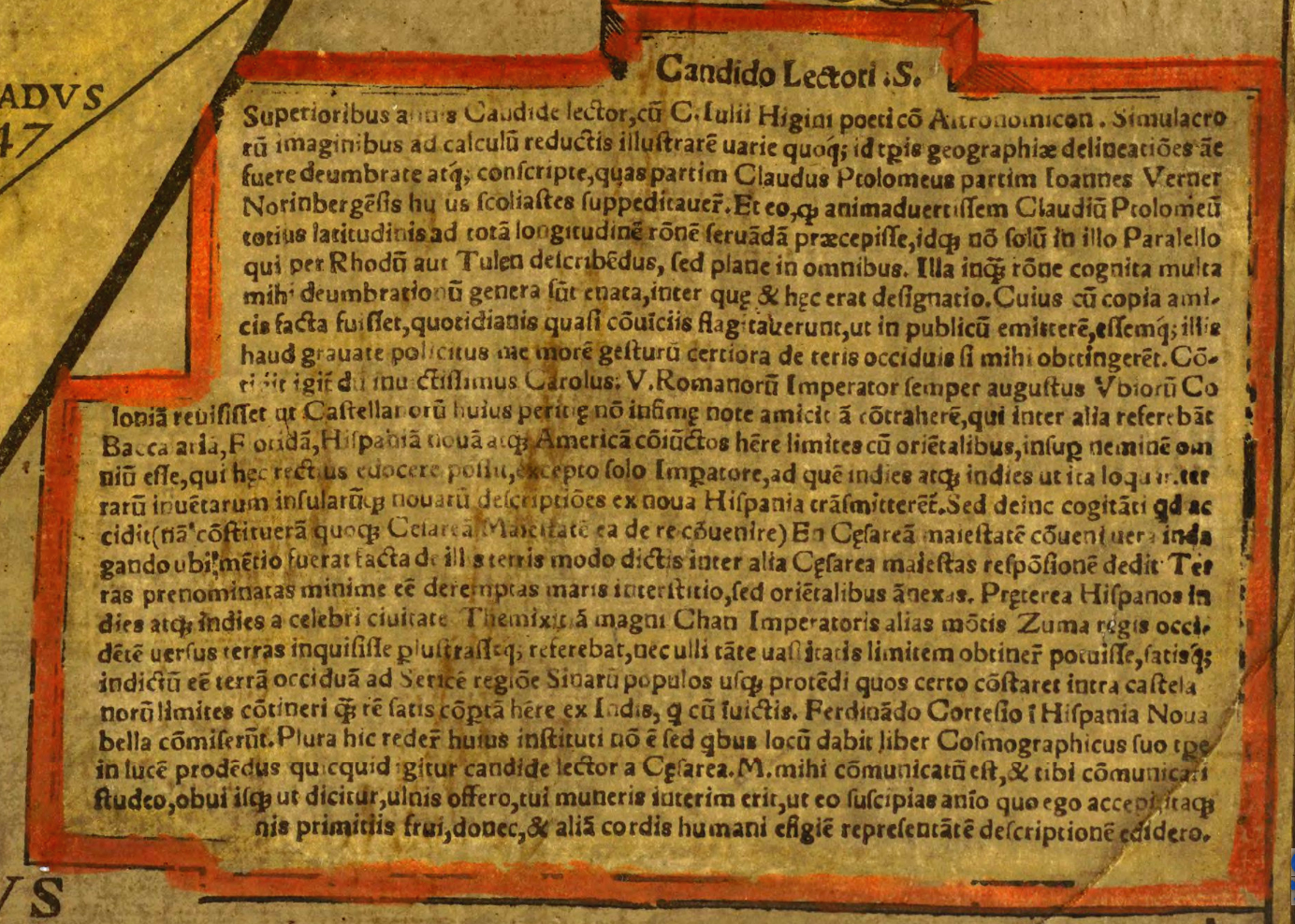
Inscription on Caspar Vopel's world map of 1545 (1558 copy) explaining why he joined New Spain with Asia: Some years ago, Dear Reader, when I was explaining Gaius Julius Hyginus’ Poeticon Astronomicon Simulacrorum by calculated images, I also at that time outlined and wrote out various geographic delineations, to which the scholiasts, in part on Ptolemy, in part on Johann Werner of Nuremberg, contributed. And so, I anticipated that what Claudius Ptolemy had observed of the all the latitudes must be subject to reason for all longitudes, not only in the parallel described through Rhodes or Thule, but plainly for all. That way, I maintain, many kinds of [geographical] outlines were generated by me as known from reason, among which is the one marked out here which, when copies were made by friends it was loudly demanded of me by them, as it were daily, that it be sent to the public, and I had no reluctance to oblige them if they could obtain for me certainty regarding the Western lands. It came to pass then, that when the Divine Invincible Charles V, Emperor of the Romans and forever August, revisited Cologne that, among other things, as to whether the confines of Newfoundland, Florida, New Spain and America adjoined the Oriental lands, was referred to his most distinguished Spanish experts who were gathered together in friendship, but there was none of them who could correctly pronounce on this, with the sole exception of the Emperor, to whom descriptions of the said newly discovered lands and islands were daily sent from New Spain. But then, thinking on what happened (for I intended to agree with Caesar's Majesty on the matter), His Majesty Caesar, upon investigating when mention was made of those lands, among other things gave his response that the aforesaid lands by no means appeared to be cloven apart by the sea, but were joined to the oriental lands. Further, the Spanish had made voyages again and again from Tenochtitlan the famous city of the Great Khan Emperor, otherwise known as King Montezuma, westward in search of the lands referred to, and no limit to such expanses could be found; suffice to say that he declared the land that fell to the region of Serica, which includes the people of China, was certainly found to be contained within the Spanish limits, of which convincing proof came from the Indians with whom the invincible Hernán Cortés had carried on war in New Spain. Furthermore, these arrangements will not be reached here but will be brought to light in their time in whichever place the book of Cosmography gives. Therefore, Dear Reader, what was communicated to me by Caesar's Majesty, and which I studiously communicate to you, clearly as I was told, and offer on my elbow to you as an interim gift, that you will receive with approval what I accepted, for us to enjoy as first fruits until I shall have published another representative description in the shape of a human heart.
