= Emil Büchner =

German conductor and bandmaster

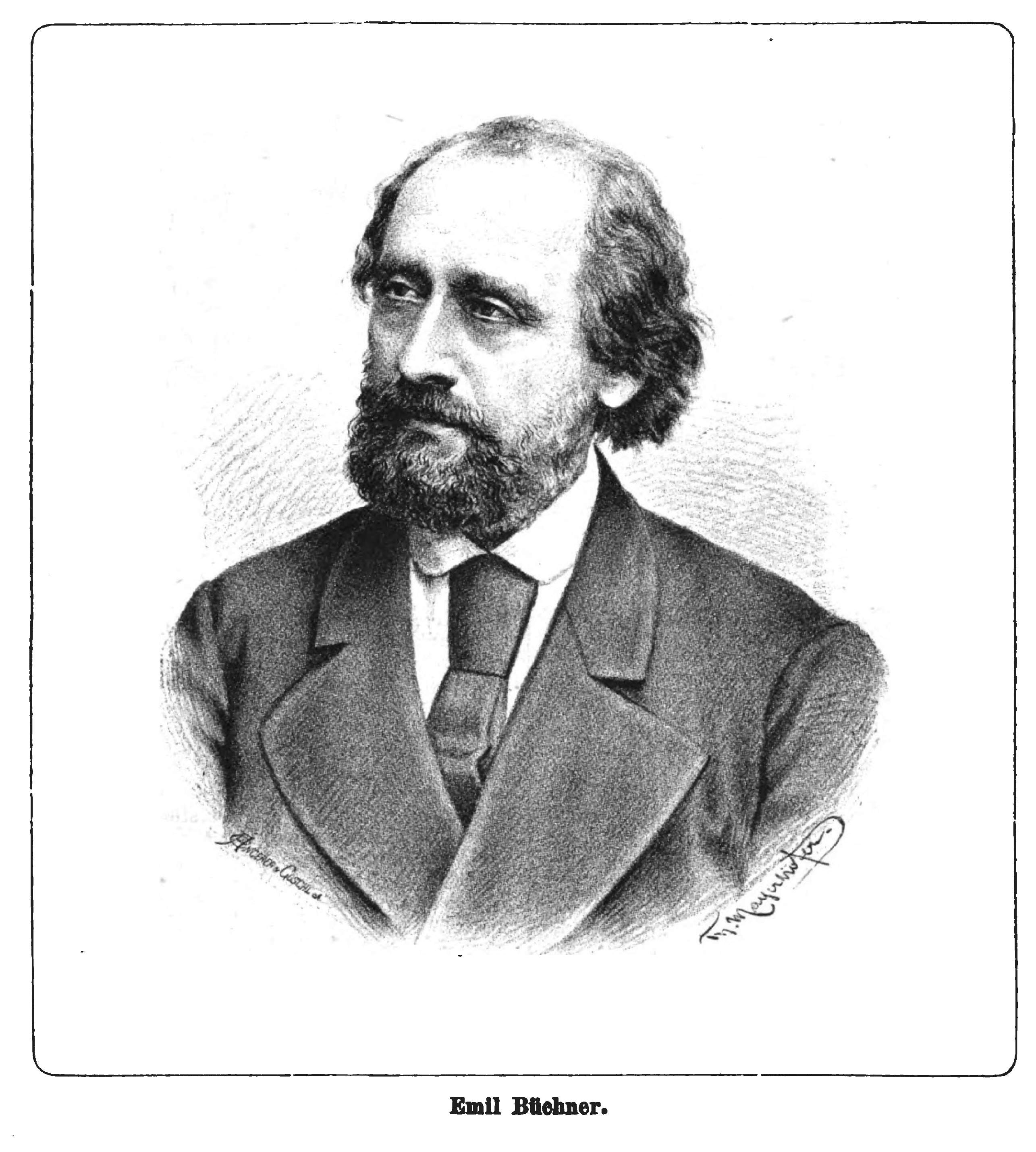
Engraving of Emil Büchner 1882

Adolf Emil Büchner (7 December 1826 in Osterfeld – 9 June 1908 in Erfurt) was a German conductor and bandmaster. He wrote a number of compositions, including operas, chamber music, choral works, and symphonies.

== Life ==
Büchner's parents encouraged his musical interests from a young age. He attended the Leipzig Conservatory between April 1843 and Easter 1846, when he graduated. He was the ninth student to attend the newly formed conservatory, and was exempt from paying tuition. After his studies he worked as a piano teacher in Leipzig until 1856. After numerous engagements as a conductor, he was from 1865 the conductor of the Meiningen Court Orchestra in the city of Meiningen.

Büchner and the court orchestra performed with Franz Liszt in 1867 in Meiningen, at the festival of the "General German Music Society". In 1876, at the request of Richard Wagner, he introduced the main contingent of the festival orchestra at the first Bayreuth Festival, which many years later participated in the Festival. As Kapellmeister, Büchner brought the orchestra a significant increase in quality. In 1880 he gave his successor, Hans von Bülow, the chapel next to a known top European orchestra.

In 1881, Büchner retired and moved to Erfurt where, from 1882 to 1898, he led the "Sollerschen Musikverein". On his 80th birthday, he was granted the title of professor by Georg II, Duke of Saxe-Meiningen.

Büchner was a member of the Leipzig Masonic Lodge, Minerva.

== Works ==
=== Songs ===
- op. 6.
  - no. 1. "Der Gruss"
- op. 18. Fünf Lieder für Mezzo-Sopran (oder Bariton) mit Pianoforte
  - no. 1. "Sehnsucht" (Text: Emanuel von Geibel)
  - no. 2. "An einem lichten Morgen" (Text: Hermann Rollett)
  - no. 3. "Ich sah den Wald sich färben" (Text: Emanuel von Geibel)
  - no. 4. "Nachtgesang" (Text: Robert Reinick)
  - no. 5. "Die stille Wasserrose" (Text: Emanuel von Geibel)
- op. 20. Vier Lieder für Mezzo-Sopran (oder Bariton) mit Pianoforte
  - no. 1. "Ave Maria"
  - no. 2. "Ich bin geliebt"
  - no. 3. "Osterlied" (Text: Adolf Böttger)
  - no. 4. "O wär' ich ein Stern"
- op. 25. Drei Lieder für Sopr. (od. Ten.) mit Pianoforte
  - no. 1. "Frühling" (Text: Friedrich Martin von Bodenstedt after Mirza Shafi Vazeh)
- op. 28. Sechs Lieder für 1 Singstimme mit Pianoforte
  - no. 1. "Ich möchte mich in Rosenduft berauschen"
  - no. 2. "Der Mondstrahl fiel in der Lilie Thau" (Text: Adolf Böttger)
  - no. 3. "Mein Stern" (Text: August Heinrich Hoffmann von Fallersleben)
  - no. 4. "Die Erde liegt so wüst und leer" (Text: Adolf Böttger)
  - no. 5. "O Welt, du bist so wunderschön" (Text: Julius Rodenberg)
  - no. 6. "Huldigung" (Text: Hermann Rollett)
- op. 29. Vier Lieder für 1 Singstimme mit Pianoforte
  - no. 1. "Willst du mein eigen sein"
  - no. 2. "O blick mich an!"
  - no. 3. "Die Haideblume von Tiefensee'
  - no. 4. "Mir träumte von einem Königskind" (Text: Heinrich Heine)

== Notable students ==
- Carl Friedemann (1862–1952)

== Sources ==
- Encyclopedia Erfurt, 99084 Erfurt
- Meininger Museums, 98617 Meiningen
