= Georg Roth =

German writer and conductor

Georg Roth (1 November 1919 – 22 June 2008) was a German conductor and music writer.

== Life ==
Roth studied piano in Weimar from 1935 to 1940 with Alfred Hoehn and later in Kronberg im Taunus, Hoehn's residence. He was unable to pursue a career as a concert pianist due to an injury to his left hand. He studied orchestral conducting in Stuttgart and after the war worked as Kapellmeister at the theatre in Wismar, among others, and later as artistic director at Stralsund Theatre. Even before the political turnaround he left the GDR at the end of the 1980s and settled in Tremsbüttel (Schleswig-Holstein).

After the death of Alfred Hoehn, Roth clearly described his method in every detail, thereby recording for posterity the practice method of one of the most important German pianists of the first half of the 20th century. This is all the more important because Hoehn regarded his technique and the ways to achieve it as a secret that was not intended for the public. Roth enjoyed Hoehn's special trust and was allowed to listen when Hoehn worked on the piano. In this way he was able to observe details that could not be communicated to other students in the classroom with such clarity.

== Work ==
- Methodik des virtuosen Klavierspiels. Die Methode Alfred Hoehns. Breitkopf und Härtel, Leipzig 1949. 2nd edition 1953. A substantially extended version under the same title was published in 1995 by Florian Noetzel, Wilhelmshaven. ISBN 3-7959-0683-0.
- Der Weg zum Belcanto. Handreichungen und Anweisungen für die Praxis. Florian Noetzel, Wilhelmshaven 1993, ISBN 3-7959-0625-3.
