= Enrique Llácer Soler =

Spanish musician (1934–2024)

Enrique Llácer Soler (Alcoy, Alicante Province, 20 June 1934 – Madrid, 11 April 2024), also known as Regolí, was a Spanish jazz and classical percussionist and composer.

== Life and career ==
Llácer Soler started his jazz career in 1952 in Barcelona's Jam Sessions while expanding his Valencia and Madrid conservatories studies under Kenny Clarke in Paris and Philly Joe Jones in New York. In 1966 he wrote a drum set method, La batería: técnica, independencia y ritmo. In 1972 he became the Spanish National Orchestra percussion soloist and he subsequently started teaching percussion in the Madrid Royal Conservatory. From then on he focused in the classical side of his career as both performer and composer, but he still was active in the Spanish jazz scene through the 1980s in bands such as Canal Street Jazz Band.

In 2015 he received the Gold Medal of Merit in the Fine Arts.

Llácer Soler died on 11 April 2024, at the age of 89.

== Compositions ==
- Soloist and Orchestra: Percussion Concerto No. 1 — Percussion Concerto No. 2 — Castanets Concerto op.24 — Coloratura Soprano Concertino op.28 — Violin Concerto op.29 — Drum Set Concerto No. 2
- Orchestra: Welleriana op.25 — Celebration for Robinne op.26 — Fantasía en dos tiempos op.30 — Secuencias rítmicas — Fantasía rítmica
- Chamber: Divertimento for Wind Sextet
- Solo percussion: Polirritmia — Tres tiempos — Fantasy for drum set

== Premieres as performer ==
Date	Venue	Composer	Composition	Orchestra	Conductor
1986–11–07	Madrid	Enrique Llácer Soler	Percussion Concerto No. 2	Spanish National	Jesús López Cobos
