= Josef Bergenthal =

German writer

Josef Bergenthal (November 1, 1900 in Oberschledorn, Province of Westphalia – August 24, 1982) was a German writer and during the period of National Socialism was one of the intellectual supporters of the regime and Nazism.

Bergenthal attended high school in Paderborn. Later he studied law and political sciences and philosophy, history, and drama. After graduation, he spent a year working for a theater magazine in Berlin. He then lived in Munster as a freelance writer and editor. He was often served as editor and also wrote for radio.

In the era of National Socialism, he was active propaganda. He worked in the Reich Propaganda Office and he was chairman for North Rhine-Westphalia and Friesland in the National Union of German Writers. He joined the SA in 1933 and the Nazi Party in 1937.

After the end of World War II, he was more active as an author. He then wrote mainly on Westphalian topics. His most successful book was "Münster is full of oddities." This reached a circulation of 100,000 copies.
