= Aspen Music Festival and School =

Classical music festival in Colorado, U.S.

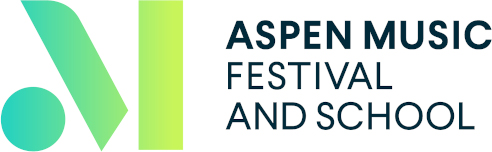

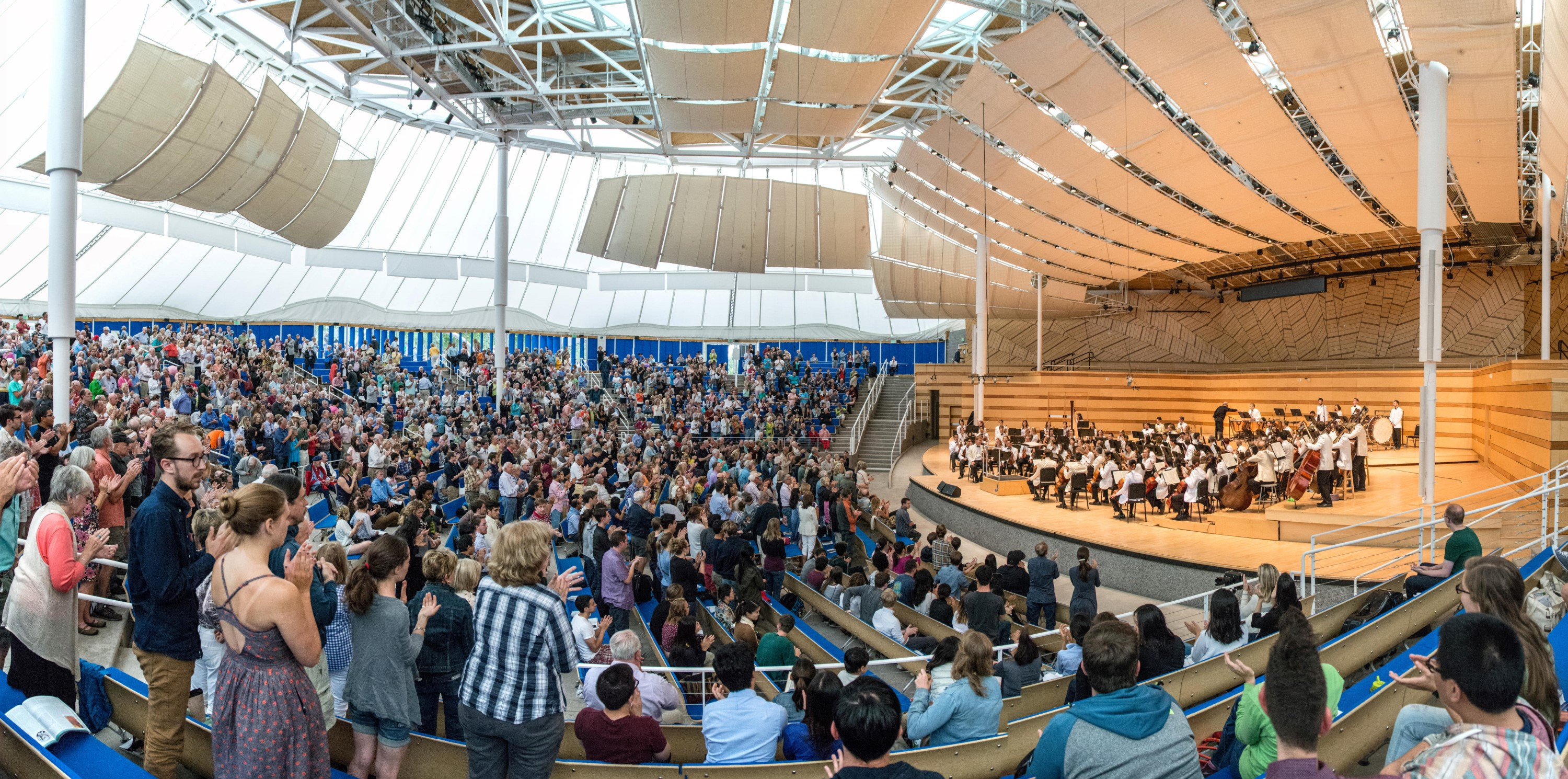
- The Michael Klein Music Tent during the 2015 Aspen Music Festival and School season
- Founded: 1949 (77 years ago)
- Founders: Walter Paepcke and Elizabeth Paepcke
- Type: Classical music festival and education
- Purpose: Annual classical music festival, music education
- Location: Aspen, Colorado, U.S.
- Coordinates: 39°10′38″N 106°50′23″W
- Key people: Meghan Martineau (Munroe President and Chief Executive Officer); Robert Spano (Wall Family Music Director)
- Website: aspenmusicfestival.com

The Aspen Music Festival and School (AMFS) is a classical music festival held annually in Aspen, Colorado, United States.

It is noted both for its concert programming and the musical training it offers to mostly young-adult music students. Founded in 1949, the typical eight-week summer season includes more than 400 classical music events—including concerts by four orchestras, solo and chamber music performances, fully staged opera productions, master classes, lectures, and children's programming—and brings in 70,000 audience members.

In the winter, the AMFS presents a small series of recitals and Metropolitan Opera Live in HD screenings.

As a training ground for young-adult classical musicians, the AMFS draws more than 650 students from 40 states and 34 countries, with an average age of 22. While in Aspen, students participate in lessons, coaching, and public performances in orchestras, operas, and chamber music, often playing side-by-side with AMFS artist-faculty.

The organization is led by Munroe President and CEO Meghan Martineau Umber and Wall Family Music Director Robert Spano.

== History ==
The Aspen Music Festival and School was founded in 1949 by Chicago businessman Walter Paepcke and Elizabeth Paepcke as a two-week bicentennial celebration of the 18th-century German writer Johann Wolfgang von Goethe. The event, which included both intellectual forums and musical performances, was such a success that it led to the formation of both the Aspen Institute and the Aspen Music Festival and School.

In the summers that followed, the participating musicians returned, bringing their music students, and the foundation was set for the AMFS as it is known today. In 1950, Igor Stravinsky became the first conductor to present his own works with the festival. The following year, in 1951, the school enrolled its first official class, with 183 music students.

Early founding musicians included baritone Mack Harrell (father of cellist Lynn Harrell) and violinist Roman Totenberg (father of NPR legal correspondent Nina Totenberg). Early performance highlights include then-student James Levine conducting the Benjamin Britten opera Albert Herring in 1964, coinciding with Britten's visit to Aspen that summer to accept an award from the Aspen Institute. In 1965, Duke Ellington and his orchestra came to the AMFS to perform a benefit concert. In 1971, Dorothy DeLay joined the AMFS strings artist-faculty and attracted more than 200 students each summer to her program. In 1975, Aaron Copland came to Aspen as a composer-in-residence on the occasion of his 75th birthday. In 1980, John Denver performed with the Aspen Festival Orchestra for his TV special Music and the Mountains, which aired the following year on ABC. Multiple artist-faculty members have also recorded albums while in Aspen, including the Emerson String Quartet, which recorded the Shostakovich: The String Quartets 5-disc set from AMFS venue Harris Concert Hall and won the 2000 Grammy Award for Best Classical Album.

=== Music directors ===
- 1954: William Steinberg
- 1955: Hans Schweiger
- 1956–1961: Izler Solomon
- 1962: Walter Susskind
- 1963: Szymon Goldberg
- 1964–1968: Walter Susskind
- 1970–1990: Jorge Mester
- 1991–1997: Lawrence Foster
- 1998–2009: David Zinman
- 2012–Present: Robert Spano

== Educational programs ==
The Aspen Music Festival and School offers young musicians a choice of the following programs of study:

- Orchestra/Instrumental
  - Strings, Winds, Brass, Percussion, Harp
  - Center for Orchestral Leadership
- Chamber Music
  - Center for Advanced Quartet Studies
  - American Brass Quintet Seminar @Aspen
  - Aspen Chamber Music
- Aspen Opera Theater and VocalARTS (Beginning 2020)
  - Voice
  - Opera Coaching
- Solo Piano
- Collaborative Piano
- Aspen Conducting Academy
- Susan and Ford Schumann Center for Composition Studies
- Aspen Contemporary Ensemble
- Classical Guitar

== Facilities ==
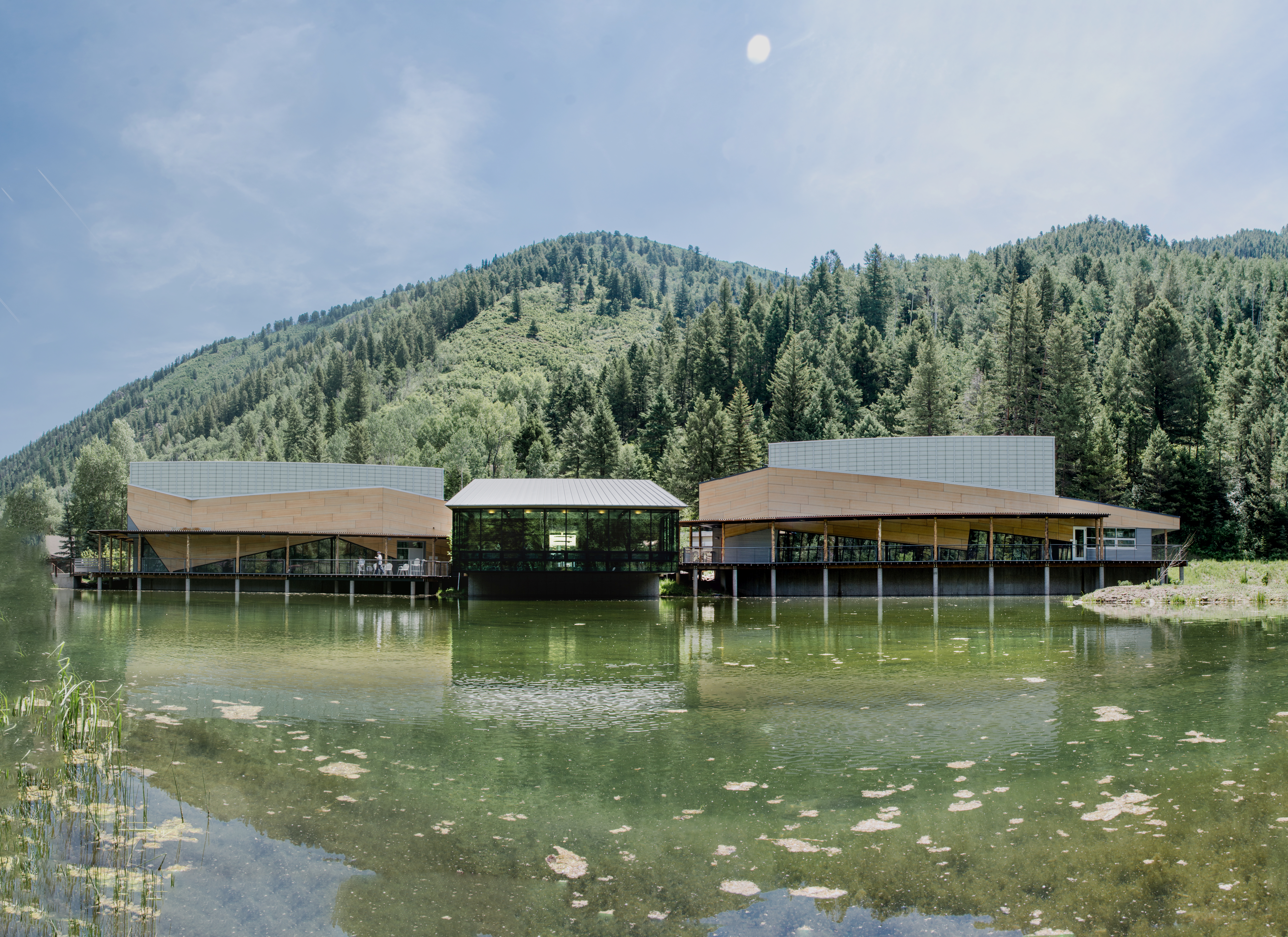
The "Pond Cluster" at the Matthew and Carolyn Bucksbaum Campus

The Michael Klein Music Tent, which opened in 2000, is the festival's primary concert venue and seats 2050. The tent replaced an earlier tent designed by Herbert Bayer, which in 1965 replaced the original smaller tent designed by Eero Saarinen. Concerts are held in the Michael Klein Music Tent on a nearly daily basis during the summer, and seating on the lawn just outside the Tent, where many choose to picnic during events, is always free. The design has open sides; the curving roof is made of Teflon-coated fiberglass, a hard material also used by the Denver International Airport.

The 500-seat Joan and Irving Harris Concert Hall is located next door to the Michael Klein Music Tent, and was opened in 1993 at a cost of $7 million. The Wheeler Opera House—a Victorian-era venue owned by the City of Aspen—is the home to Aspen Opera Center productions in the summer and the AMFS's Metropolitan Opera Live in HD screenings in the winter.

In 2016, the AMFS completed its $75 million, 105,000-square-foot Matthew and Carolyn Bucksbaum Campus, which serves as the center of its teaching activities. The campus, located two miles from downtown Aspen, sits on a 38-acre site that is shared between the AMFS in the summer and Aspen Country Day School during the academic year. Designed by architect Harry Teague, who also designed the AMFS's Harris Concert Hall and the Michael Klein Music Tent, the Bucksbaum Campus includes three expansive rehearsal halls, numerous teaching studios and practice rooms, a percussion building, administrative offices, and a glass-enclosed cafeteria. The campus was designed with Aspen's natural setting in mind: the buildings’ roof lines mirror the shapes of the surrounding mountains and hug the contours of the ponds and creek.

== Notable alumni ==
- Philippe Bach, Swiss conductor
- Winifred Horan, American violinist/fiddler
- Susan Slaughter, American orchestral trumpeter

== See also ==
- Education in Colorado
- List of classical music festivals
- List of opera festivals
- Music of Colorado
