= Jesús López Cobos =

Spanish conductor (1940–2018)

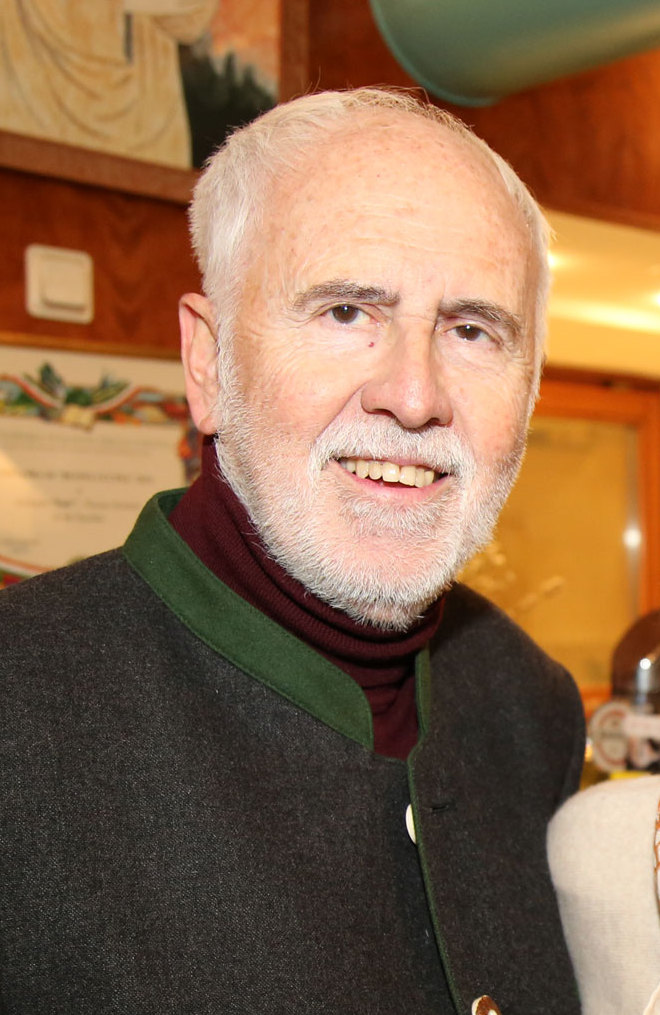
Jesús López Cobos in 2015

Jesús López Cobos (25 February 1940 – 2 March 2018) was a Spanish conductor.

== Early life and career ==
López Cobos was born in Toro, Zamora, Spain. He studied at Complutense University of Madrid and graduated with a degree in philosophy. Later he studied conducting with Franco Ferrara and with Hans Swarowsky at the University of Music and Performing Arts Vienna.

From 1981 to 1990 he was general music director of the Deutsche Oper Berlin and from 1984 to 1988 he was music director of the Orquesta Nacional de España. From 1986 to 2001 he served as music director of the Cincinnati Symphony Orchestra, and from 1990 to 2000 he was principal conductor of the Orchestre de Chambre de Lausanne. From 2003 to 2010 he served as music director of the Teatro Real in Madrid. He was a National Patron of Delta Omicron, an international professional music fraternity, as well as an honorary brother of the Eta-Omicron chapter of Phi Mu Alpha Sinfonia.

== Death ==
López Cobos died in Berlin, Germany, on 2 March 2018, age 78 of cancer-related causes.

== Awards ==
- 1981 Prince of Asturias Award for the Arts.

== Premieres ==
Date	Venue	Composer	Composition	Soloist(s)	Orchestra
1986–11–07	Madrid	Enrique Llácer Soler	Percussion Concerto No. 2	Enrique Llácer Soler	Spanish National
1986–11–07	Madrid	Lalo Schifrin	Guitar Concerto	Ángel Romero	Spanish National

== See also ==
- Lopez Cobos International Opera Conductors Competition

Cultural offices
Preceded by Lawrence Foster	Artistic Director, Orchestre de Chambre de Lausanne; 1990–2000	Succeeded by Christian Zacharias
Preceded by Luis Antonio García Navarro (1997–2001)	Music Director of the Teatro Real; 2003–2010	Succeeded by Gerard Mortier
