= Ingo Harden =

German journalist and author (born 1928)

Ingo Harden (born 26 February 1928) is a German music critic and writer.

== Life ==
Born in Hamburg, Harden studied musicology with Heinrich Husmann and piano with Ilse Fromm-Michaels. From 1954 he worked first as an author and later as an editor for the then Nordwestdeutscher Rundfunk. In 1964 he took over the editorial office of Fono Forum and headed the journal until 1976. From 1964 he was one of the jurors, later until 2000 managing secretary of the Preis der deutschen Schallplattenkritik. From 1977 to 1991 Harden was the German representative of the International Record Critics' Award. After decades of work as a record critic for trade journals and daily newspapers such as Frankfurter Allgemeine Zeitung and Die Welt, Harden is still active today as an author for radio and books.

== Work ==
- Claudio Arrau : e. Interpretenportr..
- Epochen der Musikgeschichte. Entwicklung und Formen der europäischen Musik. Gerstenberg Verlag, Hildesheim 2007. ISBN 978-3-8369-2575-4
- Kurze Geschichte in 5 Kapiteln: Klassische Musik. Jacoby & Stuart, Berlin 2010. ISBN 978-3-941087-96-5.
- (together with Gregor Willmes:) Pianistenprofile: 600 Interpreten. Bärenreiter, Kassel 2008. ISBN 978-3-7618-1616-5.
