= Gregor Willmes =

German mucicologist, music writer and cultural manager

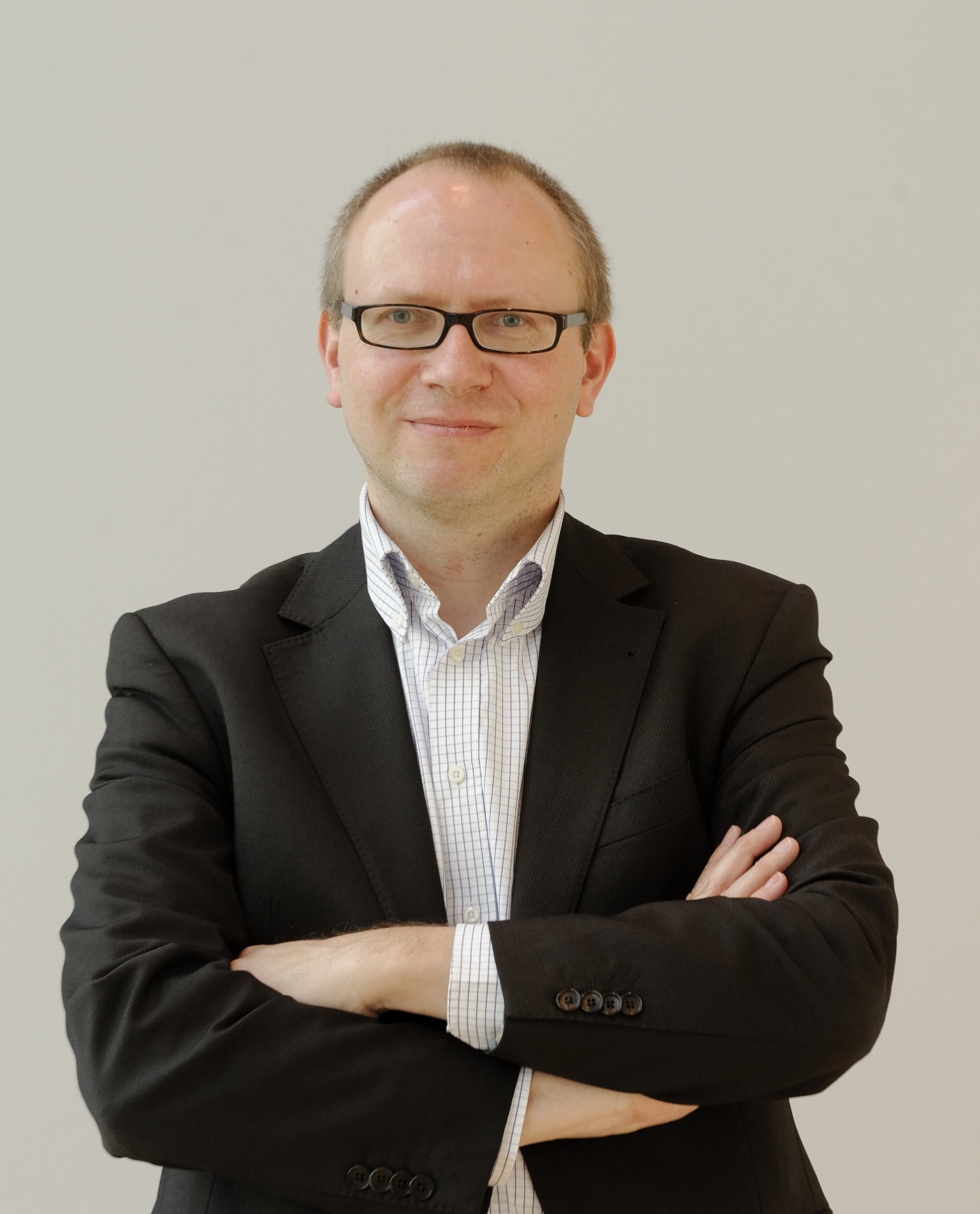
Gregor Willmes

Gregor Willmes (born 30 March 1966) is a German musicologist, music writer and cultural manager.

== Life and career ==
Born in Wanne-Eickel, Willmes took private piano, organ and music theory lessons with Matthias Kreuels. He studied musicology, philosophy and art history at the University of Bochum.

Willmes has been writing about music for daily and music magazines since 1989. In addition, he writes programmed texts for major music festivals, booklet texts for major record labels and musical essays. Willmes was a volunteer at the Westdeutsche Allgemeine Zeitung. Since 1997 he was editor and from 2003 to 2008 chief editor of the music magazine Fono Forum. He is co-author of the work PianistenProfile - 600 performers: their biography, their style, their recordings. Since 2008 Willmes has been working as cultural manager for the Berliner Klavierfabrik C. Bechstein Pianoforte Aktiengesellschaft. Since 2000 he has been a member of the jury for the Preis der deutschen Schallplattenkritik in the piano category. In 2017 he was appointed to the board of the Carl-Bechstein-Stiftung.

Willmes was lecturer for piano music history and literature at the Hochschule für Musik Detmold in Dortmund.

== Work ==
- Ingo Harden, Gregor Willmes (2008). PianistenProfile. 600 Pianisten: Ihre Biografie, ihr Stil, ihre Aufnahmen (1. ed.). Kassel: Bärenreiter. ISBN 978-3-7618-1616-5.

== Sources ==
- Preis der Deutschen Schallplattenkritik. "Gregor Willmes (Kurzbiografie)" (in German). Archived from the original on 4 May 2019.
- Fono Forum. "Gregor Willmes (short biography)" (in German).
