= Wilhelm Berger =

German composer, pianist and conductor (1861–1911)

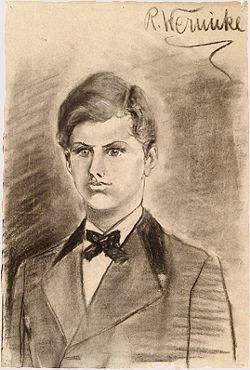
Wilhelm Berger.

Wilhelm Reinhard Berger (9 August 1861 – 16 January 1911) was a German composer, pianist and conductor.

== Life ==
Berger's father, originally a merchant from Bremen, worked in Boston (where Berger was born) as a music shopkeeper and made a name for himself as an author after the family had returned to Bremen in 1862. Early on, his son showed signs of musical interest and aptitude. By the time of his first concert, age fourteen, Wilhelm had already composed a large number of songs and works for the piano. Between 1878 and 1884, Berger studied at the Royal Conservatory in Berlin, under Ernst Rudorff (piano) and Friedrich Kiel (counterpoint). From 1888 to 1903, he was a teacher at the Klindworth-Scharwenka Conservatory, a function that he combined, from 1899, with the chief conductorship of the Berlin Musical Society. In addition, he was very active as a concert pianist. In 1903, Berger was made a member of the German Royal Academy of Arts, and in the same year he was appointed 'Hofkapellmeister' in Meiningen as successor of Fritz Steinbach. In 1911 he died at Jena, aged 49, due to complications after a stomach operation.

== Musical style ==
Like most of the composers from the circle of the 'Berlin Academics', Berger developed a great mastery of music theory. Stylistically, his music is very close to that of Johannes Brahms, even though it almost hints at the later works of Max Reger (who was to become Berger's successor as Meiningen Kapellmeister) through its preference for dissonant harmony and counterpoint techniques.

Berger was a prolific composer - his oeuvre numbers well over a hundred works. The Piano Quintet, Op. 95, the Second Symphony and the late compositions for choir are generally considered to be his masterpieces. Long after his death, his work was rated very highly, particularly among musical conservatives. Wilhelm Altmann wrote very positively about Berger in the third volume of his influential Manual for String Quartet Players (Handbuch für Streichquartettspieler).

== Selected works ==
=== Choral music ===
- Gebet, Op. 22
- Sechs Gesänge for mixed choir, Op. 25
  - Es schleicht um Busch und Halde
  - Im Fliederbusch
  - Leise rauscht des Lebens Welle
  - Ständchen
  - Trost der Nacht
  - Wie nun alles stirbt und endet
- Drei Gesänge for mixed Chorus Op. 44
  - Ach in diesen blauen Tagen
  - Lenzfahrt
  - Niss Puk
- Vier geistliche Lieder und Gesänge, Op. 54
  - Mitten wir im Leben sind
  - Müde, das Lebensboot weiter zu steuern
  - Groß ist der Herr
  - Gebet
- Drei Gesänge für 6- und 8-stimmigen Chor, Op. 103
  - Karfreitag
  - Sturmesmythe
  - Von ferne klingen Glocken

=== Orchestral ===
- Konzertstück for Piano and Orchestra in E minor, Op. 43a (1895)
- Symphony No. 1 in B♭ major, Op. 71 (1896-7)
- Symphony No. 2 in B minor, Op. 80 (1900)
- Variations and Fugue on an original Theme, Op. 97 (1904)
- Serenade for Twelve Wind Players, Op. 102 (1910)

=== Chamber music ===
- Violin Sonata No. 1, Op. 7
- Piano Quartet in A major, Op. 21
- Cello Sonata in D minor, Op. 28
- Violin Sonata No. 2, Op. 29
- String Trio in G minor, Op.69 (1898)
- Violin Sonata No. 3 in G minor, Op. 70
- String Quintet in E minor, Op. 75 (1899)
- Clarinet Trio in G minor, Op. 94 (1903)
- Piano Quintet in F minor, Op. 95 (1904)
- Piano Quartet in C minor, Op. 100

=== Piano music ===
- Sonata in B major, Op. 76
- Four Fugues, Op. 89
- Variations & Fugue on an original theme, Op. 91

RISM Online lists 191 (as of April 2024) manuscript/early print entries of works by Wilhelm Reinhard Berger, including an autograph of a different (fragmentary, or at least missing one page) piano trio in G minor (date unknown, but begins with a slow introduction, so not the same as the clarinet trio - RISM 201010608), a fragmentary cello sonata, 71 kinderlieder, and other works, many of these in the library of the Max-Reger-Archiv, Meiningen.

== Recordings ==
Only a small portion of Berger's oeuvre has been recorded, but interest in his works appears to have been rekindled in recent years. The Verdi Quartet released a recording of the Piano Quintet in F major in 1994, and several choral works were recorded; by the Spektral label in 2006 and by the Landesjugendchor Thüringen, conducted by Nikolaus Müller, in 2017. The pianist Mitsuko Saruwatari released two albums with piano works by Berger, and in 2023 the German label CPO published a CD with recordings of the first symphony and the Konzertstück, performed by Olivier Triendl with the Württembergische Philharmonie Reutlingen, conducted by Clemens Schuldt.
