= Op. 120 =

In music, Op. 120 stands for Opus number 120. Compositions that are assigned this number include:

- Beethoven – Diabelli Variations
- Berio – Op. 120, No. 1
- Brahms – Clarinet Sonatas
- Fauré – Piano Trio
- Ries – Piano Concerto No. 5
- Schumann – Symphony No. 4
