= Piano Sonata No. 3 (Brahms) =

Work by Johannes Brahms, composed 1853

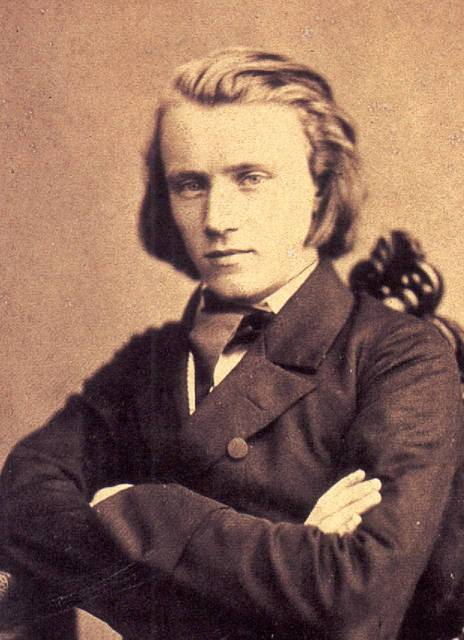
Detail from a photograph of Johannes Brahms in 1853, the year he composed this sonata

The Piano Sonata No. 3 in F minor, Op. 5 of Johannes Brahms was composed in Düsseldorf in 1853, when the composer was just over 20 years old. It was published the following year. The work is dedicated to Countess Ida von Hohenthal of Leipzig.

This sonata is unusually ambitious in scope, consisting of five movements, as opposed to the traditional three or four. When Brahms composed this sonata, the sonata genre was seen by many to have passed its heyday. Brahms, who deeply admired Beethoven and the classical style, composed the sonata with a masterful combination of free Romantic spirit and strict classical architecture. The work is the last of his three piano sonatas, and was presented to Robert Schumann in November of 1853; it was the last work that Brahms submitted for commentary to Schumann, whose final disastrous mental health crisis was about to begin.

== Music ==
The sonata is in five movements:

1. Allegro maestoso (F minor, ending in F major)
2. Andante. Andante espressivo — Andante molto (A♭ major – D♭ major)
3. Scherzo. Allegro energico avec trio (F minor – D♭ major – F minor)
4. Intermezzo (Rückblick / Regard en arrière). Andante molto (B♭ minor)
5. Finale. Allegro moderato ma rubato (F minor, ending in F major)

A performance generally lasts between 30 and 40 minutes, depending on tempo and whether repeats are observed.

=== I. Allegro maestoso ===
The first movement begins with fortissimo chords that span almost the entire range of the piano register. A movement in sonata form, it is essentially composed of two musical subjects. The first of these is in F minor, which is followed by a brief episode that features the "fate motif" from Ludwig van Beethoven's Symphony No. 5 in the same key as the symphony, C minor. After a return of the initial F minor subject, the second subject area begins in the key of the relative major (A♭ major) but ends in D♭ major. Brahms uses these keys in the same way in the second movement of this sonata as well. The exposition is repeated and leads to a complex development section in which the "fate motif" is incorporated. After the beginning of the recapitulation, the piece moves directly to the second subject, by-passing the C minor episode, in the parallel key of F major, and finishes with an extended coda.

=== II. Andante. Andante espressivo – Andante molto ===
Above the first bars Brahms placed a verbal quotation of a poem by Otto Inkermann, writing under the pseudonym C.O. Sternau:

Der Abend dämmert, das Mondlicht scheint, da sind zwei Herzen in Liebe vereint und halten sich selig umfangen	Through evening's shade, the pale moon gleams While rapt in love's ecstatic dreams Two hearts are fondly beating.

Perhaps symbolizing the two beating hearts in this Andante are its two principal themes, one in A♭ major and the other in D♭ major, which alternate throughout the movement. The two themes are quoted below.

Toward the end, the music subsides as if to conclude, but there follows a passage of new music, in slow triple time, starting ppp with soft pedal but ultimately building to a very powerful, ecstatic culmination. The theme employed is as follows.

The movement concludes with one more mention of the first theme. It exemplifies progressive tonality as it ends in D♭ major rather than the key in which it began, A♭ major.

This movement has attracted great admiration from pianists. In an interview, Nelson Goerner commented of the second theme: "This is incredibly beautiful, it’s just divine. It’s like the music floats and doesn’t touch the earth." Jannie Burdeti, in program notes, wrote that the movement "contains some of the most sublime music ever written." Claudio Arrau described the movement as ‘the greatest love music after Tristan, and the most erotic -- if you really let go, without any embarrassment.’

=== III. Scherzo. Allegro energico avec trio ===
The third movement, a scherzo and trio, begins in F minor with a musical quotation of the beginning of the finale of Felix Mendelssohn's Piano Trio No. 2, Op. 66. In contrast to the tumult of the scherzo, the trio in D♭ major is calm and lyrical, and the accompanying bass too refers to Beethoven's "fate motif". Once the trio brings back the movement's opening material at its close, the scherzo is repeated in whole.

=== IV. Intermezzo (Rückblick). Andante molto ===
The fourth movement is marked as an intermezzo and is given the title "Rückblick", literally "Remembrance". It begins with the initial theme of the second movement, but in the key of B♭ minor. Like the opening and third movements, the "fate motif" figures prominently throughout the intermezzo.

=== V. Finale. Allegro moderato ma rubato ===
The fifth and final movement is a rondo in the home key of F minor. It explores several ideas that become intertwined in the virtuosic and triumphant close. Notably, the first diversion from the rondo theme begins with a musical cryptogram that was a personal musical motto of his lifelong friend Joseph Joachim, the F–A–E theme, which stands for Frei aber einsam (free but lonely). The second episode, in D♭ major, uses four pitches, F, E♭, D♭, A♭, as the basis for a great deal of the musical material that follows. Like Brahms's Piano Sonata No. 2, this sonata's finale also ends in the parallel major.

The movement is difficult to perform, an issue on which the pianist Nelson Goerner commented: "The music is extremely difficult, but lots of the difficulties don’t get noticed. It’s not a spectacular virtuosity; the virtuosity is there but it’s not about showing off." Goerner goes on to say: "when we reach the coda, the pianist needs to take risks. It needs to feel as if the music is nearly but not quite coming off the rails, otherwise the meaning is lost."

== See also ==
- Piano Sonata No. 1 (Brahms)
- Piano Sonata No. 2 (Brahms)
- F-A-E Sonata
