= Violin Sonata No. 3 (Brahms) =

Composition by Johannes Brahms

- by Johannes Brahms
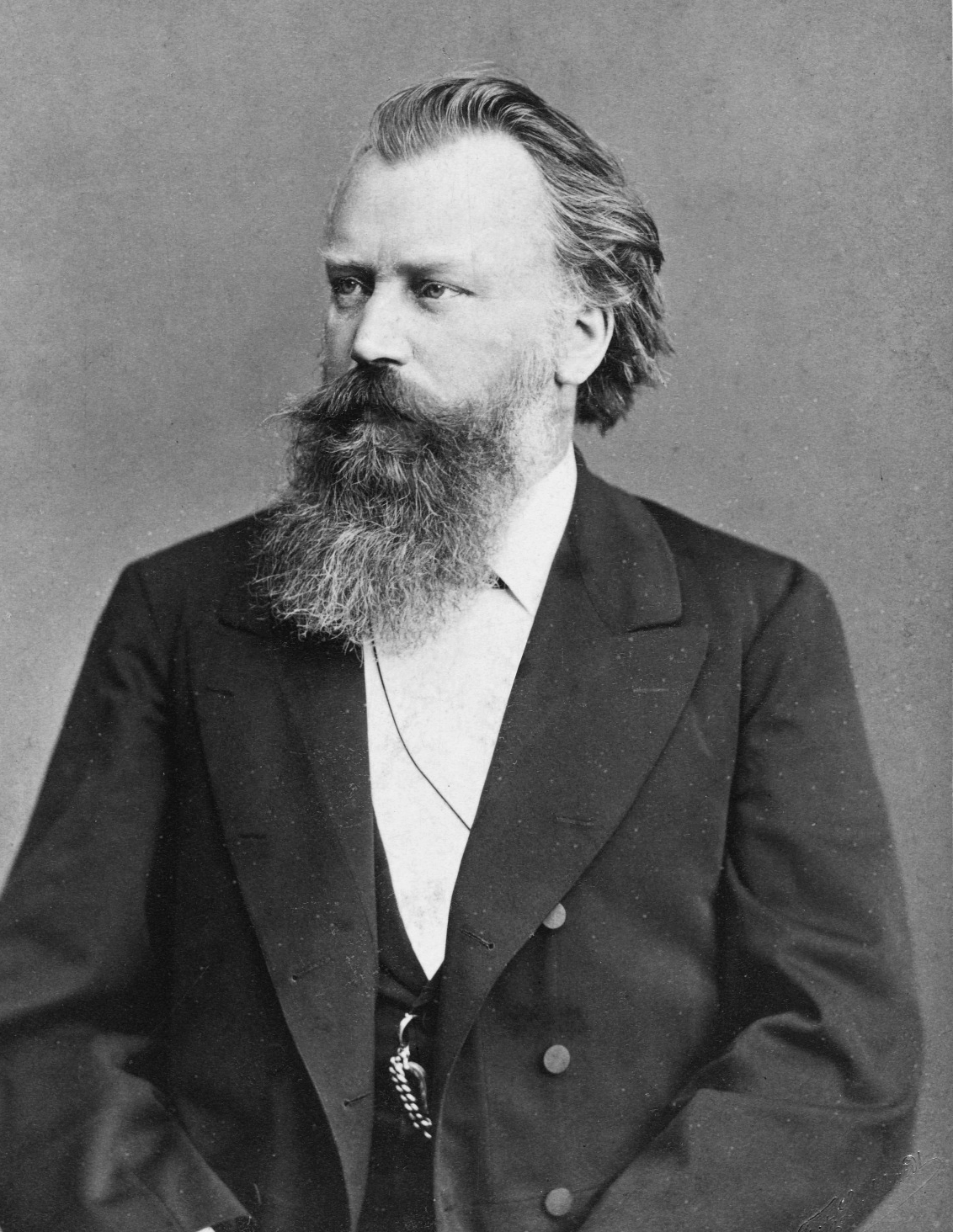
- The composer around 1885
- Key: D minor
- Opus: 108
- Composed: 1886–1888
- Dedication: Hans von Bülow
- Movements: 4
- Scoring: Violin and piano

Premiere
- Date: 1888
- Location: Budapest
- Performers: Jenő Hubay, Johannes Brahms

Johannes Brahms's Violin Sonata No. 3 in D minor, Op. 108 is the third and last of his violin sonatas, composed between 1886 and 1888. Unlike the two previous violin sonatas, it is in four movements (the others are in three movements). The sonata is dedicated to Brahms' friend and colleague Hans von Bülow and was premiered in Budapest in 1888, with Jenő Hubay on violin and the composer at the piano.

== Structure ==
External audio
- Performed by Josef Suk and Julius Katchen
- I. Allegro
- II. Adagio
- III. Un poco presto e con sentimento
- IV. Presto agitato

The sonata consists of four movements:

1. Allegro
2. Adagio
3. Un poco presto e con sentimento
4. Presto agitato

=== I. Allegro ===
The first movement is in traditional sonata-allegro form. The first subject, a long, lyrical cantabile line in D minor, is stated sotto voce by the violin with the piano providing a simple accompaniment; off-beats in the right hand provide a quietly agitated character. Immediately after the violin's closing cadence ends the first statement of the first subject, the subject is taken up by the piano, subito forte and with a virtuosic, heroic character; now it is the violin's turn to provide an accompaniment, again in syncopated rhythm. The second subject, a romantic, expressive melody in F major, is then stated by the piano alone, and repeated by the violin with a simple arpeggiated piano accompaniment.

Next comes the development section: the violin plays a variant of the first subject elaborated with bariolage bowing, while the piano again provides the accompaniment in the right hand. Of particular interest in this section is the pedal point on the dominant (A) which the pianist sustains in the left hand for the entire duration of the development section.

The recapitulation begins with the violin restating the first subject as in the beginning but an octave lower, the piano plays an elaborated version of the original accompanying figure. After the final cadence of the subject, three sudden unison chords announce, subito forte, an unexpected direct modulation into F♯ minor. In the ensuing section, of virtuosic and symphonic character, violin and piano toss back and forth fragments of the original theme. After a direct modulation back to D minor, the recapitulation resumes its course, and then the second subject is restated in D major. Once more back into D minor and the first subject makes one more appearance in the violin, in the original octave, accompanied by the original figure in the piano. There is a brief sotto voce return to the elaborated material of the development section which then passes through a series of modulations. One final sostenuto statement of the first subject across three octaves leads to a cadence in D major, which leads directly into the second movement.

=== II. Adagio ===
The second movement, in D major, is a gentle and lyrical cavatina for the violin, with the piano reduced to the role of accompanist throughout. The character is romantic and nostalgic, with the 3/8 meter creating a slow waltz-like rhythm. The melody is stated espressivo by the violin in the mid-lower register and proceeds in a calm, introspective character until a sudden two-measure modulation and crescendo lead to an impassioned climax, played in double stop thirds by the violin.

Following a brief interlude the melody is stated again an octave higher and with a somewhat less restrained character—it bears the characteristic Brahmsian marking poco forte (literally "a bit loud".) This time the modulation takes a different turn and the climactic theme is stated a fourth higher than before, in C Lydian dominant. As the melodic line descends and arrives back in D major, rather than playing a simple cadence the violin suddenly takes off on a rhapsodic, improvisatory arpeggiation through D major and finally reaches the triumphant third statement of the climactic theme, a third above its previous appearance and this time still in the home key of D major. A brief echo of the opening theme then leads to a final, subdued cadence.

=== III. Un poco presto e con sentimento ===
In contrast to the second movement, in the third movement it is the piano that takes center stage. The piano states the main theme, a stammering, uneasy scherzando in F♯ minor, with the violin providing a simple accompaniment on off-beats, interspersed with brief melodic fragments. The second statement of the theme is taken by the violin, with the melodic fragments from the violin's previous accompanying figures becoming part of the melody itself. The violin then interrupts the proceedings and comes fully into the spotlight with an impassioned, rhapsodic outburst elaborated by virtuosic arpeggios, which ends with a forceful series of chords. The same material is presented again in D minor immediately thereafter. A modulation back to F♯ minor leads into a recapitulation of the original material. The piano again states the main theme, sotto voce, while the violin accompanies with pizzicato thirds. A brief coda leads to an understated ending.

=== IV. Presto agitato ===
The fourth and final movement returns to the sonata's home key of D minor. It is the most virtuosic of all four movements, and the frenzied, passionate character, along with the 6/8 meter, are suggestive of a tarantella. The structure is similar to the first movement, with two contrasting subjects linked together by interludes of melodic fragments and modulations. After a four-measure introduction in which the piano states the beginning of the first subject accompanied by the violin with a virtuosic series of broken chords, the two instruments switch roles and the violin states the first subject in its entirety, a lyrical but stormy, impassioned melody, accompanied in the piano by the same broken-chord figure originally seen in the violin. The second part of the first subject is a nervous, stammering series of melodic fragments, full of sharp dynamic contrasts.

The piano then states, unaccompanied, the second subject in C major. This theme bears some resemblance to the second theme of last movement of his Piano Sonata No. 3. This is an elegant, stately and calm melody, played simply and straightforwardly. The violin then plays the melody and the piano adds some syncopated rhythms to the accompaniment, bringing back an echo of the movement's overall agitated character.

Soon enough, right as the violin finishes playing the melody, the development section begins with tarantella material in the piano, played pianissimo and una corda. The violin echoes the piano, and the piece moves through several modulations. A brief restatement of the first subject then ensues, followed by a remarkable interlude: the piano plays a stripped-bare, simplified version of the first subject pianissimo in the slower tempo of the second subject, accompanied by a chromatic, understated syncopated figure in the violin.

It builds to a climactic restatement of the beginning of the first subject in F minor, which then leads into a virtuosic development of the tarantella-like material of the first subject. After a return to the second part of the first subject, the second subject is restated in F major, again unaccompanied in the piano, and then again taken up by the violin. As in the exposition, it leads directly into a recapitulation of the first subject material. A full-blown return to the first subject leads to a thundering conclusion in D minor.
