= Op. 120, No. 1 (Berio) =

Song composed by Luciano Berio

- by Luciano Berio
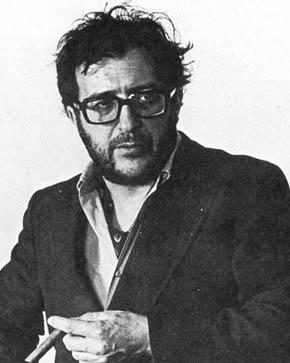
- Luciano Berio.
- Key: F minor
- Genre: Romantic music (arrangement)
- Form: Sonata
- Composed: 1986
- Published: 1986
- Movements: 4
- Scoring: Clarinet (or viola) and orchestra

Op. 120, No. 1 (also entitled Opus 120, No. 1 or in its German form, Opus 120, Nr. 1) is a 1986 arrangement for clarinet and orchestra of Johannes Brahms's Clarinet Sonata Op. 120, No. 1 by Italian composer Luciano Berio. As with the original Sonata, the soloist in this arrangement can either be a clarinet or a viola.

== Composition ==
An avant-garde composer, Luciano Berio was also active as an arranger, an example being his Quattro versioni originali della "Ritirata notturna di Madrid", an arrangement of Luigi Boccherini's Musica notturna delle strade di Madrid. Op. 120, No. 1 is an arrangement for clarinet and orchestra of Johannes Brahms's Clarinet Sonata Op. 120, No. 1, which was commissioned by the Los Angeles Philharmonic in 1986, and was premiered with clarinetist Michele Zukovsky in Los Angeles, on 6 November 1986. The composition was dedicated to Franco Debenedetti and Barbara Debenedetti and was later published by Universal Edition.

Brahms himself stated once in a letter to the dedicatee of the original composition, Richard Mühlfeld, that he had not "been so impulsive as to write a concerto" for him. The arrangement retains the title of 'Sonata' even though, given that it is arranged for soloist and orchestra, it could be considered a concerto.

== Structure ==
Op. 120, No. 1 is in four movements and takes 25 minutes to perform. As in the case of Brahms's original composition, the soloist part of Berio's arrangement can be played by either a clarinet or a viola. Berio paid close attention to the original, only adding an extended introductory section and arranging the rest of the composition for orchestra, leaving the clarinet (or viola) part almost unaltered. The list of movements in this composition are as follows:

1. Allegro appassionato (F minor, ending in F major)
2. Andante un poco adagio (A♭ major)
3. Allegretto grazioso (A♭ major)
4. Vivace (F major)

The composition is scored for clarinet (or viola) and an orchestra consisting of two flutes, two oboes, two clarinets in B♭, two bassoons, one contrabassoon, three French horns in F, two trumpets in C, one trombone, timpani, and a full string section.

== Recordings ==
- The world première recording was made 1992 with clarinetist James Campbell and the London Symphony Orchestra under Geoffrey Simon for Cala Records.
- The Orchestra Sinfonica di Milano Giuseppe Verdi recorded the piece under the baton of Riccardo Chailly with clarinetist Fausto Ghiazza under Decca Records. It was recorded in August 2004 in the Auditorium di Milano.
- Kari Kriikku (clarinet), Helsinki Philharmonic Orchestra, Olari Elts. Ondine 2017.
- Daniel Ottensamer (clarinet), Sinfonieorchester Basel, Ivor Bolton. Sony Music 2019.
