= Clarinet Quintet (Brahms) =

Musical composition by Johannes Brahms

- by Johannes Brahms
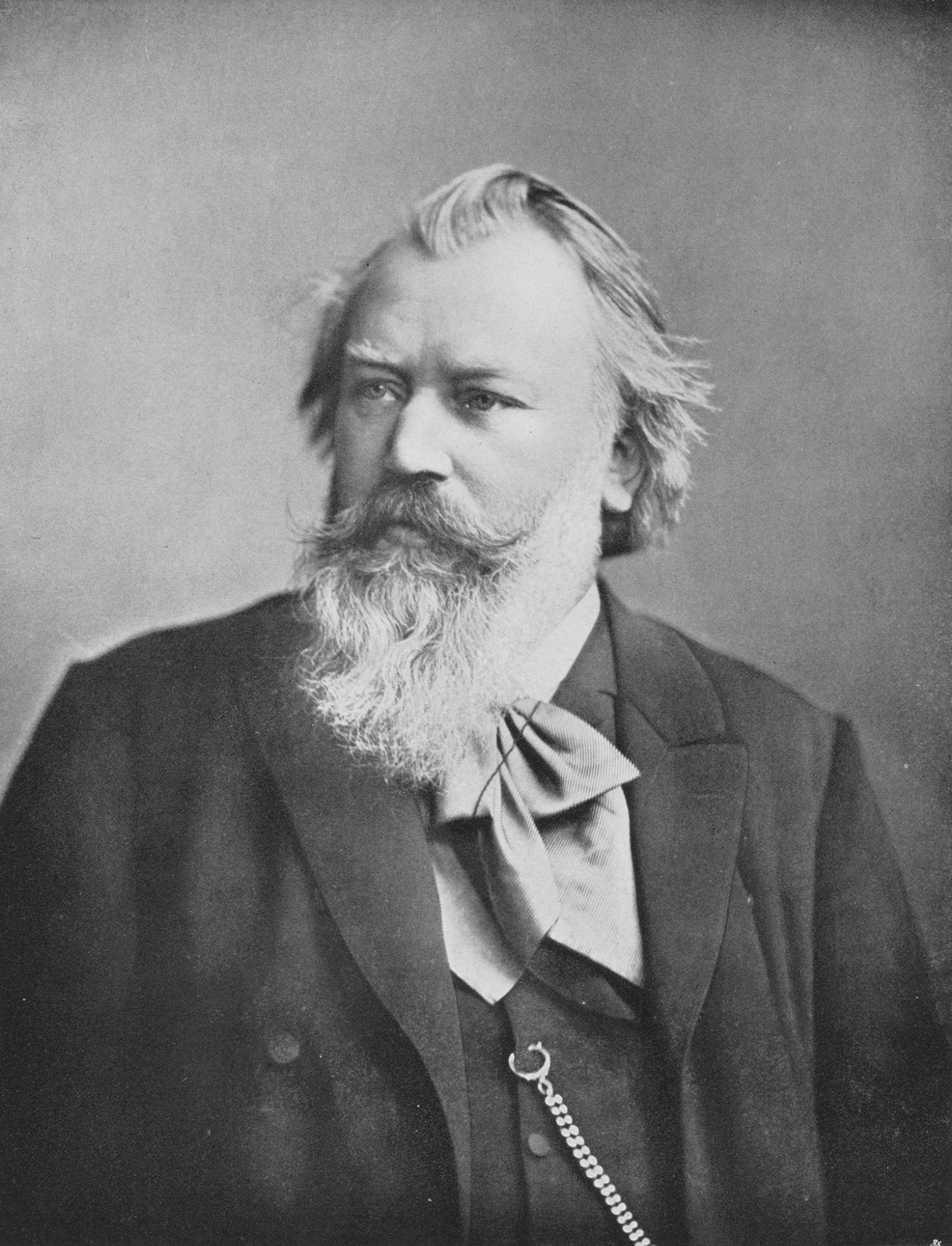
- The composer in 1889
- Key: B minor
- Opus: 115
- Composed: 1891
- Performed: 12 December 1891: Meiningen
- Movements: 4

Johannes Brahms's Clarinet Quintet in B minor, Op. 115, was written in 1891 for the clarinettist Richard Mühlfeld. It is scored for a clarinet in A with a string quartet. It has a duration of approximately thirty-five minutes.

== Background ==
=== Clarinet quintets ===
At the time Brahms started composing his Clarinet Quintet, only a few works had been composed for this type of ensemble. Examples of clarinet quintets include those by Wolfgang Amadeus Mozart, Anton Reicha, Giacomo Meyerbeer, Sigismund von Neukomm, Carl Maria von Weber, Franz Krommer, Alexander Glazunov, Heinrich Baermann, and Thomas Täglichsbeck. The Brahms quintet shows parallels to the Mozart Quintet, especially in form.

=== Brahms and Mühlfeld ===
Brahms had retired from composing prior to listening to Richard Mühlfeld play. Brahms may have met Mühlfeld when Hans von Bülow was directing the Meiningen Court Orchestra. Bülow's successor Fritz Steinbach brought Mühlfeld's playing to Brahms's attention in March 1891. Brahms was very enthusiastic about Mühlfeld. That summer at Bad Ischl, he composed the Clarinet Quintet and his Clarinet Trio Op. 114, both of them for Mühlfeld. He later also composed his two Clarinet Sonatas Op. 120.

== Performances ==
The quintet received its first private performance on 24 November 1891 in Meiningen, with Richard Mühlfeld and the Joachim Quartet, led by Joseph Joachim who often collaborated with Brahms. The public premiere was on 12 December 1891 in Berlin.

It soon received performances across Europe, including London and Vienna both with the original and other ensembles. Though many clarinetists opt not to use vibrato, Richard Mühlfeld famously had a vibrato so large and rich that it was comparable to string players. When speaking about early performances of the quintet, Eric Hoeprich described that "...both the clarinetist and strings [would] make liberal use of vibrato as well as frequent rubato, which may seem excessive to us today."

== Structure ==
I. Allegro

II. Adagio

III. Andantino

IV. Con moto
Performed by William McColl and the Orford String Quartet

The piece consists of four movements.

1. Allegro in B minor, in 6/8 time
2. Adagio in B major, in 3/4 time modulating into B minor and then B♭ minor and back to B major
3. Andantino in D major, in. Evolving into Presto non assai, ma con sentimento in B minor in 2/4 time
4. Con moto in B minor, in 2/4 with a key transition to B major returning to B minor into a meter of 3/8 and then transforming into 6/8 time

=== I. Allegro ===
Like the quintet by Mozart, the strings begin the piece. Only several bars after the clarinet's entry is it finally made clear that the key of the music is B minor rather than D major (the latter being the key in which the exposition ends, leading smoothly into the repeat of the clarinet's opening). This movement sets an autumnal mood for the rest of the composition.

One phrase, towards the middle played by the clarinet, sounds closely related to one in the first movement of Carl Maria von Weber's Clarinet Concerto No. 1 in F minor. This was possibly inserted because when Brahms listened to Richard Mühlfeld at his recital, he was playing this concerto.

=== II. Adagio ===
The bowed strings are played with mutes (con sordino) throughout the movement. Mainly in B major, the reflective melody is first introduced by the clarinet, and is sometimes chromatic with some shifts to B minor. The middle section is in B minor, its mood recalling the gloomy atmosphere of the first movement. Here, the clarinet performs technical runs playing from all ranges. Via an agitated transition with even more modulations, the music calms down and returns to the beginning theme, and then subsides.

=== III. Andantino ===
This movement, the shortest of the four, begins in D major. In measure 23, the clarinet and violin play as if they were talking in a conversation. It modulates back from D major into the darker B minor. This section is highly influenced by the first part and even ends the same except being in a 2/4 meter.

=== IV. Con moto ===
This movement is marked Con moto (with motion) and contains a theme and five variations as do the final movements of Mozart's Clarinet Quintet and Brahms's Clarinet Sonata No. 2. Tempo varies according to the musician. The fourth variation, in B major, has a sweet melody mostly performed by the clarinet, which recalls the mood of the second movement. The fifth (final) variation, beginning with the viola playing the melody over the pizzicato cello, is back in B minor but bears a different metrical sign (6/8) till the end of the movement. The coda brings multiple themes from the first movement, and finally ends with a sudden loud B minor chord which eventually fades away (as opposed to the quiet ending in the first movement).
