= Geistliches Lied =

Choral composition by Johannes Brahms

- Choral composition by Johannes Brahms
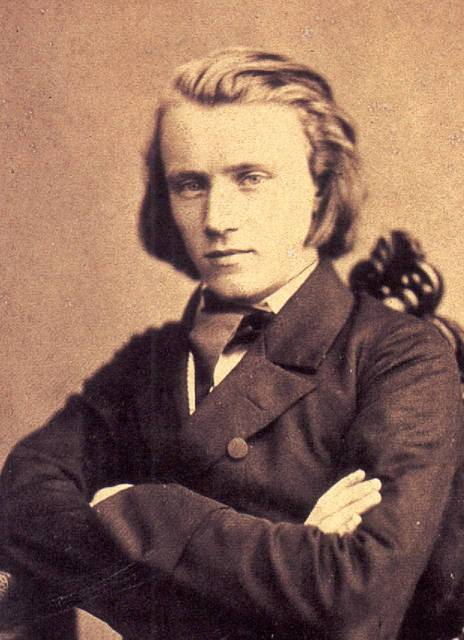
- The composer c. 1855
- Opus: 30
- Text: "Geistliches Lied" by Paul Flemming
- Composed: 1856
- Published: 1864

Geistliches Lied (English: "Sacred Song" or "Spiritual Song"), Op. 30, by Johannes Brahms is an 1856 work for four-part mixed chorus accompanied by organ or piano. The composition is in the form of a double canon set to text by Paul Flemming. It was written as part of an exchange of contrapuntal exercises between Brahms and Joseph Joachim, and it was eventually published in 1864.

== Background ==
Beginning in March 1856, Brahms and the violinist Joseph Joachim engaged in a weekly "back and forth" trade of contrapuntal studies. Among the works Brahms composed during this exchange was Geistliches Lied, which Brahms sent to Joachim on June 5, 1856 (Jan Swafford dated the piece's composition to April 1856). Brahms himself wrote to Joachim: "No doubt the canon [Geistliches Lied] does not especially please you? The interludes are quite terrible? The 'Amen' (I mean the word generally) will do; that part pleases me the most."

Joachim approved of Brahms's work, describing it as "On the whole very beautiful..." However, Joachim criticized the music's lack of harmony: "But there are many harsh places! For example, in the Amen in question, the tenor, which is beautiful in and of itself, clashes all too harshly with the alto and soprano at the place marked!" The violinist proceeded to accuse Brahms of being more concerned over counterpoint than beauty: "Your ear is so used to rough harmonies, of such polyphonic texture, that you rarely consider the voices just in their mutual clashing—because for you the proper and complementary is always associated right away. But you cannot ask that of the listener, even the most musical; and since all art is meant to inspire collective delight, since that is its holiest virtue, I beg you to think about that."

Ultimately, the only one of these contrapuntal exercises Brahms considered for publishing was the Geistliches Lied, which was published by Breitkopf & Härtel in 1864 as Brahms's Op. 30. The work was first performed on July 2, 1865, at St. James's Church, Chemnitz.

== Text ==
The text is the ninth of the 17th-century German writer Paul Flemming's odes ("Geistliche Lieder"). Below is both the original German text and an English translation:

Laß dich nur nichts nicht dauren
mit Trauren,
sei stille!
Wie Gott es fügt,
so sei vergnügt
mein Wille.

Was willst du heute sorgen
auf morgen?
Der Eine
steht allem für,
der gibt auch dir
das Deine.

Sei nur in allem Handel
ohn Wandel,
steh feste!
Was Gott beschleußt,
das ist und heißt
das Beste.

Amen.

Translation:

Let nothing afflict you
with grief;
be calm!
As God ordains,
so may my will
be content.

Why worry today
about tomorrow?
The One
is in charge,
who gives also to you
what is yours.

In all your doings
be steadfast;
stand firm!
What God decrees
is, and is acknowledged,
the best.

== Music ==
The composition is scored for four-part mixed chorus accompanied by organ or piano. Brahms marked the autograph score of Geistliches Lied with "Double canon at the ninth". The first canon consists of the tenor imitating the soprano while the second consists of the bass imitating the alto, with both canons at the interval of a ninth. Karl Geiringer cited the work as an example of "Brahms's astounding mastery of contrapuntal writing".

The organ prelude is based on an inverted anticipation of the first canon, which evolves by the sixth bar into a quotation of the main theme from the finale of Schumann's Fourth Symphony. The three verses of the text, separated by organ interludes, are set to ternary form. The outer two verses are in E♭ major, and Brahms places special emphasis in these verses by having the two canons coincide at the lines "Sei stille" (be calm) and "Steh feste" (be steadfast). The canonic theme is inverted in the middle verse in C minor, beginning with four measures of chorus without organ accompaniment. The final "Amen" is sung over an E♭ pedal point in the organ, and the work concludes on a plagal cadence.

Swafford suggested the music's organ opening references a fantasy of Clara Schumann's (Brahms's close companion and love interest). That fantasy was for Clara to study the organ in secret, only for her husband Robert to unexpectedly find her playing his music on the instrument. However, Swafford described the rest of the music's tone as "lamenting", and the choral text to be "consoling the sorrowful with submission to fate". The musicologist Misha Donat believed that Brahms possibly addressed the work to Clara to console her while she dealt with her husband's illness.
