= Piano Sonata No. 2 (Brahms) =

1852 composition by Johannes Brahms

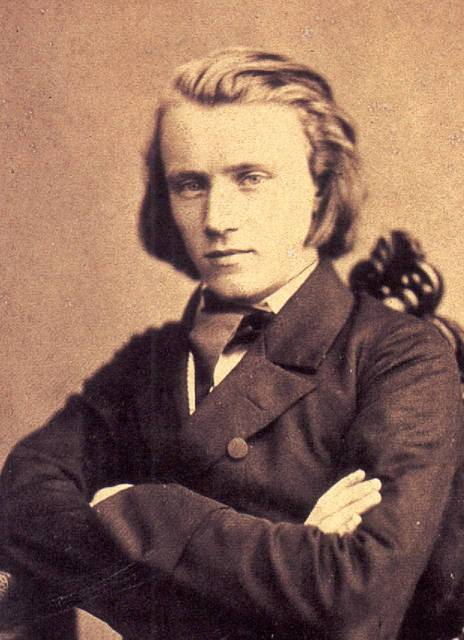
Johannes Brahms in 1853

Johannes Brahms composed the Piano Sonata No. 2 in F♯ minor, Op. 2, in 1852 in Hamburg, Germany, and it was published the year after. Despite being his second published work, it was actually composed before his Piano Sonata No. 1 but published later because Brahms recognized the importance of an inaugural publication and felt that the C major sonata was of higher quality. It was sent along with his first sonata to Breitkopf und Härtel with a letter of recommendation from Robert Schumann. Schumann had already praised Brahms enthusiastically, and the sonata shows signs of an effort to impress with its technical demands and highly dramatic nature. It is dedicated to Clara Schumann.

== Music ==
The sonata is in four movements:

1. Allegro non troppo, ma energico (F♯ minor)
2. Andante con espressione (B minor, ending in B major)
3. Scherzo: Allegro – Poco più moderato (B minor – D major – B minor)
4. Finale: Sostenuto – Allegro non troppo e rubato – Molto sostenuto (F♯ minor, ending in F♯ major)

The first movement is in the conventional sonata-allegro form. The second movement is a theme and variations based on the German Minnesang "Mir ist leide". Like the theme and variations of the Piano Sonata No. 1, the variations move from the minor mode to the parallel major. The third movement is a scherzo and trio whose beginning theme is almost identical to that of the second movement. The finale begins with a brief introduction in A major, the relative major of F♯ minor. The main subject of the introduction serves as the first theme of this movement, which is in sonata form and contains a repeated exposition. The coda of the finale, marked pianissimo and to be played with the soft pedal, returns to and expands upon material from the movement's introduction.
