= Piano Sonata No. 1 (Brahms) =

Piano Sonata written by Johannes Brahms in 1853

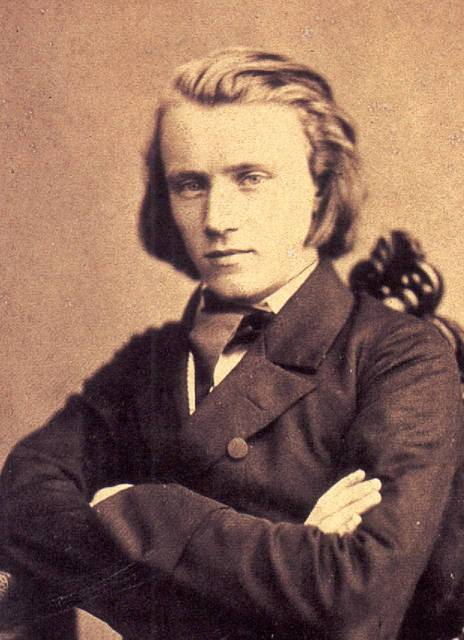
Around the time he composed the sonata.

The Piano Sonata No. 1 in C major, Op. 1, of Johannes Brahms was written in Hamburg in 1853, and published later that year. Despite being his first published work, he had actually composed his Piano Sonata No. 2 first, but chose this work to be his first published opus because he felt that it was of higher quality. The piece was sent along with his second sonata to Breitkopf & Härtel with a letter of recommendation from Robert Schumann. Schumann had already praised Brahms enthusiastically, and the sonata shows signs of an effort to impress in its symphonic grandeur, technical demands, and dramatic character. It was dedicated to Joseph Joachim.

== Music ==
The sonata is in four movements:

1. Allegro (C major)
2. Andante (nach einem altdeutschen Minneliede) (C minor, ending in C major)
3. Allegro molto e con fuoco — Più mosso (E minor – C major – E minor)
4. Allegro con fuoco — Presto non troppo ed agitato (C major)

The first movement is in conventional sonata form with a repeated exposition. The opening of the first theme has been compared to the opening of Beethoven's "Hammerklavier" Sonata. The second movement is a theme and variations inspired by the song Verstohlen geht der Mond auf. Brahms was to rewrite it for female chorus in 1859 (WoO 38/20). The third movement is a scherzo and trio. The fourth is a loose rondo whose theme is noticeably changed at every recurrence. It is highly technically demanding on the performer, with toccata-like intensity and rapid thirds throughout. The form of the rondo is a palindrome ABACACABA.

== Text of the song for the second movement ==
Verstohlen geht der Mond auf. Blau, blau Blümelein! Durch Silberwölkchen führt sein Lauf. Blau, blau Blümelein! Rosen im Tal, Mädel im Saal, O schönste Rosa!	Stealthily rises the moon. Blue, blue flower! Through silver cloudlets makes its way. Blue, blue flower! Roses in the dale, Maiden in the hall, O handsomest Rosa!
