= Piano Concerto No. 4 (Ries) =

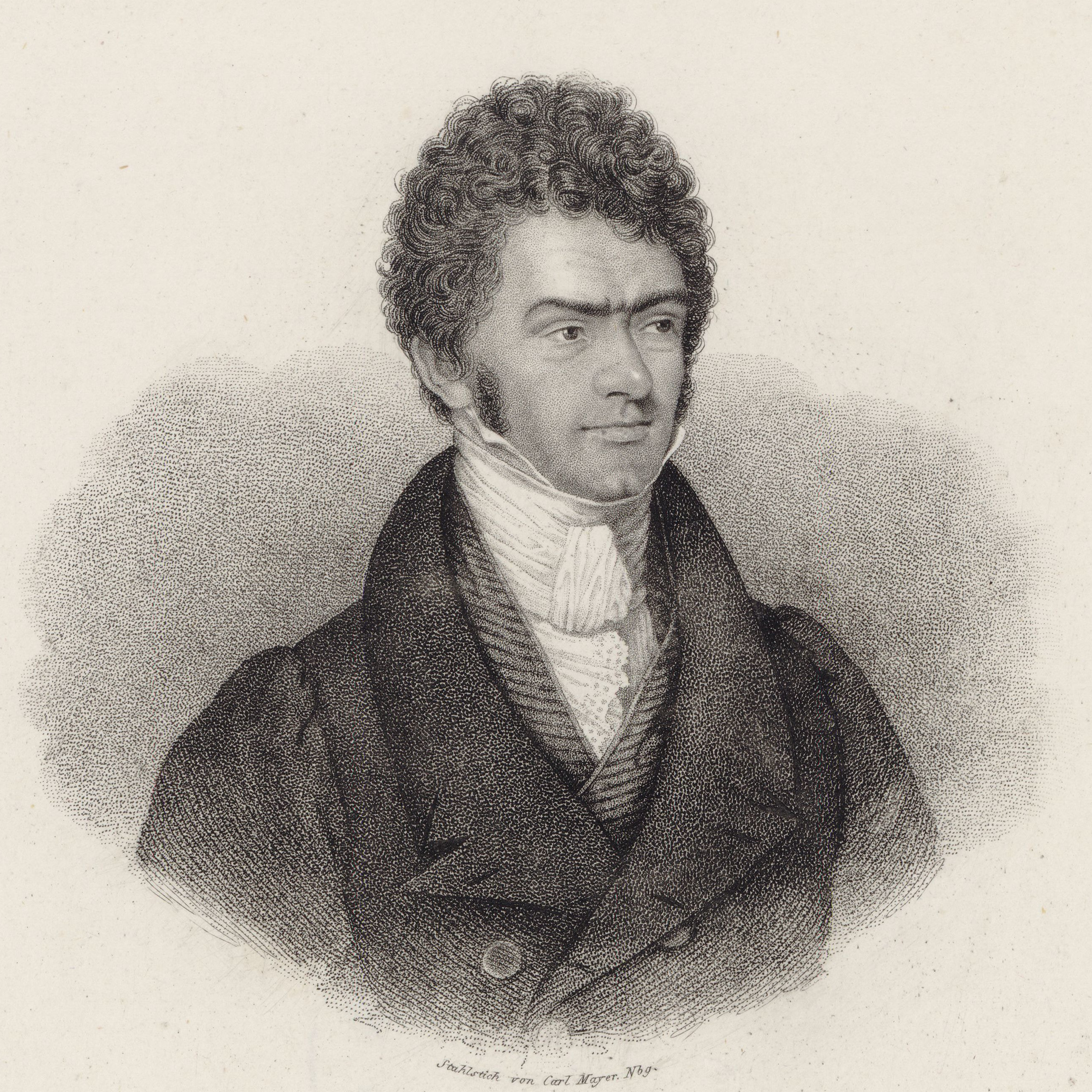
Ferdinand Ries

The Piano Concerto No. 4 in C minor, Op. 115 by Ferdinand Ries was composed in Bonn in 1809 but was not published until 1823 when it was released by both H.A. Probst of Leipzig and Birchall & Cº of London with a dedication to Ignaz Moscheles.

== Composition history ==
According to Allen Badley, Ries completed the concerto around 1809, before embarking on his European tours. This would make the concerto the second of the composers eight piano concertos to be written. (Note: Concerto no. 4 refers to the order of publication, not composition, and likewise for all of Ries's concertos.) Badley further comments that compared with the Piano Concerto in C Major, Op. 126 that this concerto has much more individuality compared with the earlier work which shows the influence of Beethoven's C minor Piano Concerto, Op. 37, the work Ries had performed on his debut. As with the concerti Op. 120, 123 & 132, this concerto was published at a time Ries was retiring from being a touring performer and no longer needed to keep these works, which formed the basis of his performing repertoire secret.

== Structure ==
The concerto follows the traditional three-movement structure:

1. Allegro
2. Molto adagio
3. Rondo: Allegretto

== Recordings ==
To date the concerto has only been recorded once, by Uwe Grodd with the Bournemouth Symphony Orchestra and soloist Christopher Hinterhuber, this was released by Naxos Records (Note: Paired with a recording of the composers Op. 120 concerto.) in conjunction with a publication of the score in a critical edition prepared by Allen Badley.
