= Piano Concerto No. 5 (Ries) =

Composition of Ferdinand Ries

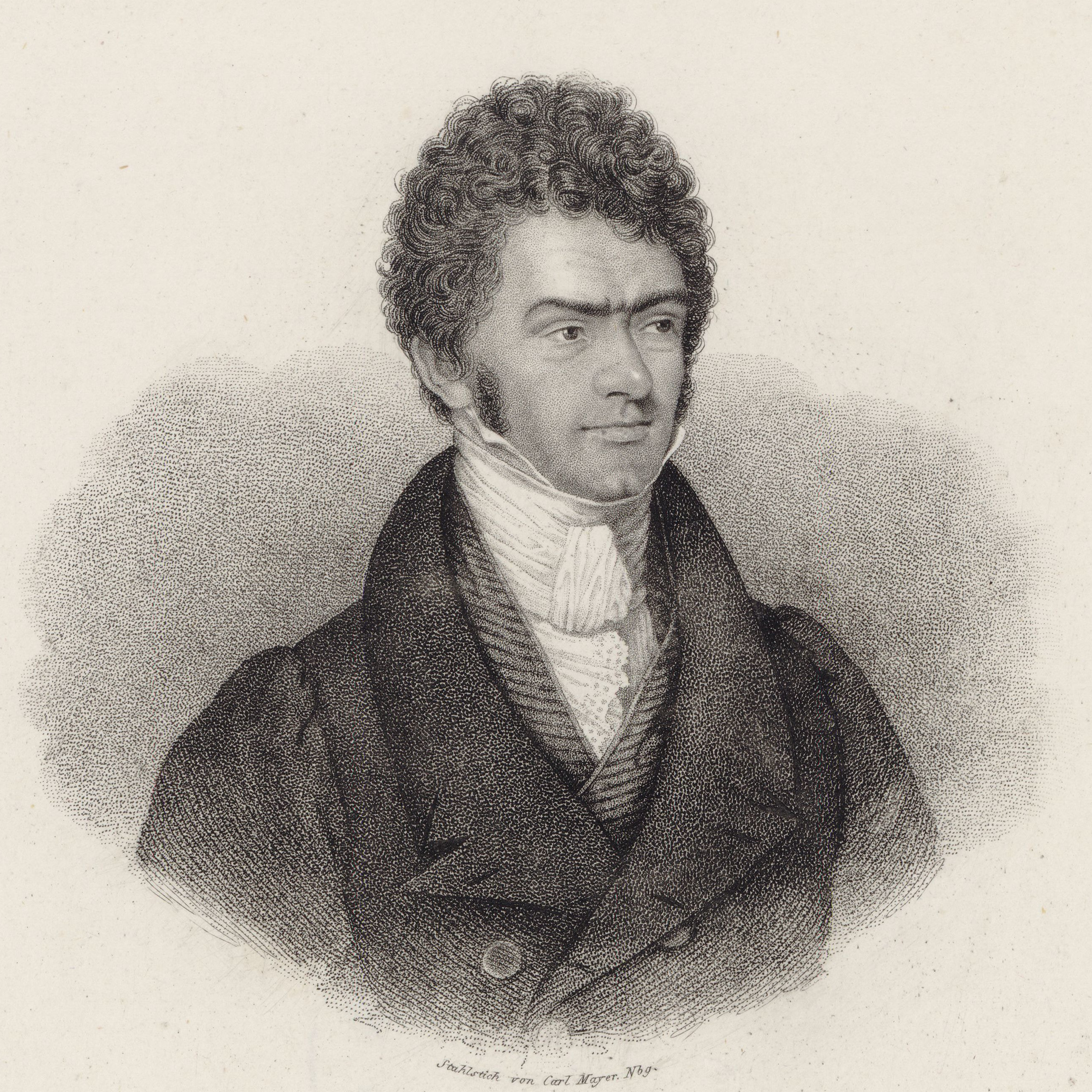
Ferdinand Ries

The Piano Concerto No. 5 in D major, Op. 120 "Concerto Pastorale", by Ferdinand Ries was composed between 1813 and 1816 and published in 1823 by the firm of Sauer & Leidesdorf with a dedication to Prince Oscar of Sweden.

== Composition history ==
According to Allen Bradley in the liner notes to the Naxos recording, the composers manuscript is undated making it difficult to determine exactly at what point the composer started working on this concerto. However the works dedication to Prince Oscar of Sweden, suggests that he started work on the concerto during his time in Sweden and worked intermittently on it, along with revisions to the Piano Concerto Op.55 until around 1815-16. This would make the concerto the sixth of the composers eight piano concertos to be written. (Note: Concerto no. 5 refers to the order of publication, not composition, and likewise for all of Ries's concertos.) The concertos publication in 1823 came at a time when Ries was retiring from active performing and so no longer needed to keep secret the works he relied on in performance.

== Structure ==
The concerto follows the traditional three-movement structure:

1. Allegro
2. Andantino
3. Rondo: Allegro

== Recordings ==
To date the concerto has only been recorded once, by Uwe Grodd with the Bournemouth Symphony Orchestra and soloist Christopher Hinterhuber, this was released by Naxos Records (Note: Paired with a recording of the composers Op. 115 concerto.) in conjunction with a publication of the score in a critical edition prepared by Allen Bradley.
