= Clarinet Trio (Brahms) =

Musical composition by Johannes Brahms

- by Johannes Brahms
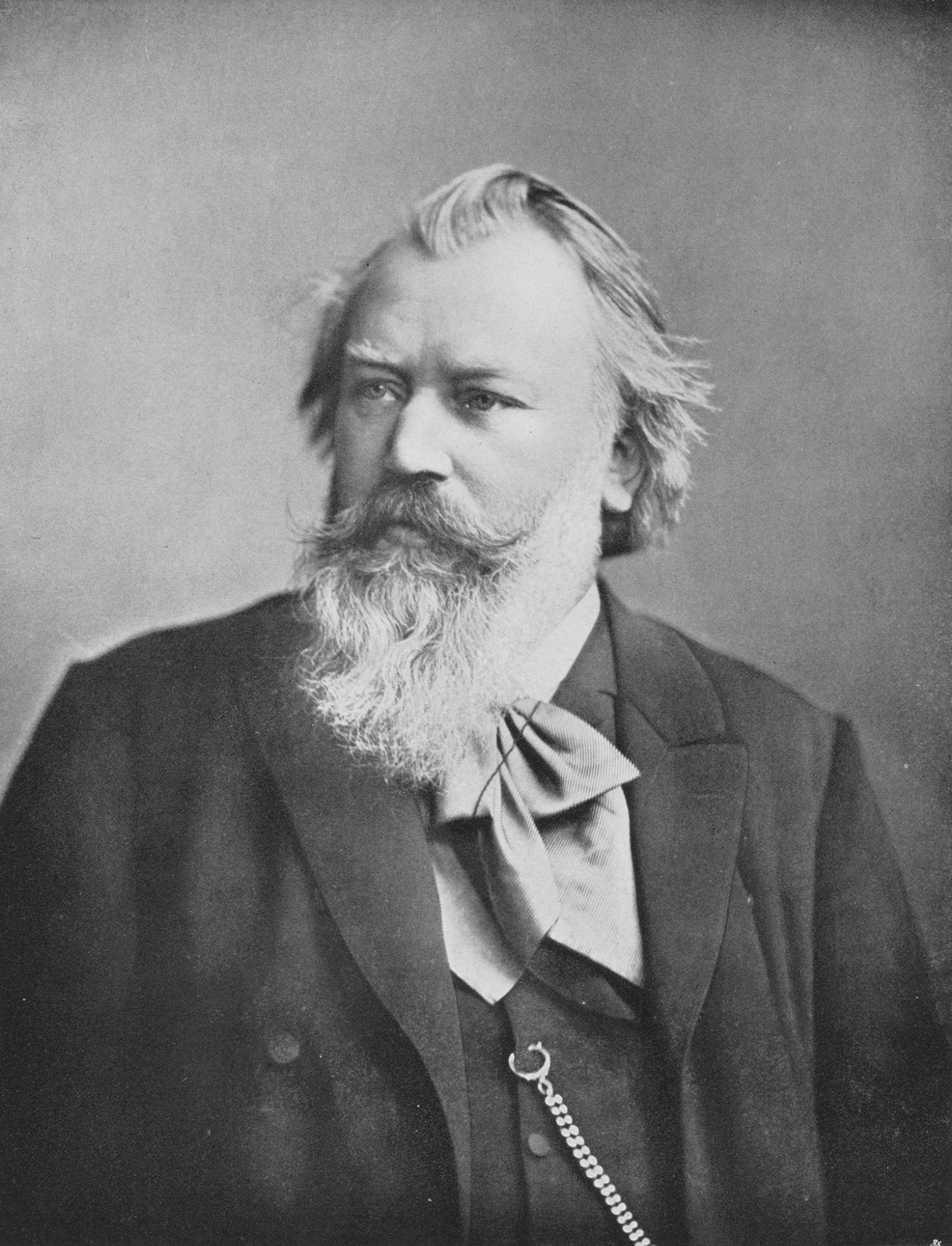
- The composer in 1889
- Key: A minor
- Opus: 114
- Composed: 1891
- Performed: 12 December 1891: Hall of the Sing-Akademie zu Berlin
- Published: 1892
- Movements: 4

The Clarinet Trio in A minor, Op. 114, is one of four chamber works composed by Johannes Brahms featuring the clarinet as a primary instrument. It was written in the summer of 1891 in Bad Ischl for the clarinettist Richard Mühlfeld and first performed privately on 24 November 1891 in Meiningen and publicly in Berlin on 12 December that year.

The work calls for clarinet, piano, and cello, and is one of the very few in that genre to have entered the standard repertoire.

== History ==
Brahms composed the Clarinet Trio in the summer of 1891 while staying in Bad Ischl. The work's composition followed a creative crisis for Brahms, who had grown tired of composing after finishing the difficult revision of his Piano Trio Op. 8. Brahms had even announced to his publisher Fritz Simrock in late 1890 that it was "finally time to quit [composing]".

However, Brahms' closer acquaintance with Richard Mühlfeld, the principal clarinettist of the Meiningen Court Orchestra, inspired him to dedicate himself to three new chamber music combinations featuring the clarinet between 1891 and 1894. Brahms had likely first met Mühlfeld in October 1881 during a visit to the court of Meiningen, but their closer collaboration developed ten years later. In letters to friends, Brahms raved about Mühlfeld's playing, writing to Clara Schumann in March 1891: "One cannot play the clarinet more beautifully than Herr Mühlfeld here".

Brahms carried the impressions of his stay in Meiningen with him to his summer holidays in Ischl, and by the end of June, he had completed the first movement of the Clarinet Trio. The composition was finished soon after, and Brahms sent the manuscript to his friend Eusebius Mandyczewski in Vienna, attaching a self-effacing note saying it was "the twin sister of an even bigger folly," referring to the Clarinet Quintet, Op. 115.

After intensive rehearsals and first performances at the court of Meiningen in November 1891 with Mühlfeld, Joseph Joachim, and cellist Robert Hausmann, the Trio was performed in Berlin and Vienna in December. The painter Adolph Menzel attended the Berlin performance on 12 December 1891, with Hausmann on cello and Brahms on piano. Deeply moved by Mühlfeld's playing, Menzel made a sketch of the clarinetist as a Greek god and told Brahms, "We often think of you here, and often enough, comparing notes, we confess our suspicions that on a certain night the Muse itself appeared in person for the purpose of executing a certain woodwind part. On this page I have tried to capture the sublime vision."

Following these performances, Brahms sent the Trio to Simrock for publication in late December. He insisted that "enough cue notes be added" in the clarinet part and made further corrections after a January 1892 performance in Vienna with Joachim. The Clarinet Trio was ultimately published by Simrock in early March 1892.

Although the published title page allowed for a viola to substitute for the clarinet, and Brahms had tried the piece with Joachim on viola during rehearsals, the clarinet was undoubtedly the composer's first choice. The suggestion of the viola alternative was primarily a marketing decision. The work calls for a clarinet in A to reach the low C♯ prominent in the first movement's main theme. Mühlfeld's own clarinet, which still exists, is known for its unusually dark tone and high pitch, just slightly below modern concert pitch.

== Music ==
The work is in four movements.

1. Allegro (sonata form, A minor, ends in A major)
2. Adagio (modified sonata form without development, D major)
3. Andantino grazioso – Trio (ternary/minuet form, A major)
4. Allegro (sonata form, A minor)

The Clarinet Trio's timbre is more dark than sunny, but Brahms lightens the atmosphere by making full use of the clarinet's wide range and its facility with arpeggios and rapid passagework. The work incorporates a considerable amount of arpeggio patterns in its theme, complemented by conversation-like passages in the upper register of the cello. This creates occasional challenges for the cellist, who is asked to mirror an agility that lies less comfortably on their instrument. As a consolation, the cello introduces most of the main themes, including both pairs of principal subjects in the first and last movements.

The clarinet's subtleties are perhaps most deeply explored in the Adagio, which leads the player through ample opportunities to showcase the instrument's wide range of pitch and dynamics while rendering a free-flowing musical excursion that mixes intimate fantasy with heart-on-sleeve passion.

=== I. Allegro ===
The first movement, Allegro, is in sonata form and features a dark, murmurous timbre. The clarinet introduces the main theme, which prominently features the low C♯ (a note that is not achievable on the standard B♭ clarinet), exploiting the clarinet's wide range. The cello often mirrors the clarinet's agility, creating occasional challenges for the cellist.

Along with this extended range, Brahms also uses long, extended melodies using interplay between the cello and clarinet to support the clarinet's large, sonorous range. Later in the movement, Brahms uses fragmented rhythms, with many arpeggios, and pedal points. One particularly unusual aspect of the movement is that the exposition section, which has modulated to E minor, ends with a plagal half-cadence (I–IV).

=== II. Adagio ===
The second movement, Adagio, is where the clarinet's subtleties are most deeply explored. The clarinet plays in the clarion and chalumeau registers with minimal leaps in the exposition. This movement showcases the instrument's wide range of pitch and dynamics, rendering a free-flowing musical excursion that mixes intimate fantasy with heart-on-sleeve passion.

=== III. Andantino grazioso – Trio ===
In the third movement, Andantino grazioso, Brahms writes for the clarinet in a folk-like, waltz style, giving it an enthusiastic and cheery tune that contrasts with the overall somber mood of the work. The harmonies shift abruptly at times to support the melody, which is shared between the clarinet and cello.

=== IV. Allegro ===
The final movement, Allegro, returns to the serious and grim mood of the first movement. The cello introduces the main themes, including both pairs of principal subjects. Brahms varies his harmonic modulation drastically, yet manages to include his signature F–A–F (Frei aber froh) chord progression. The movement incorporates a considerable amount of arpeggio patterns in its theme, complemented by conversation-like passages in the upper register of the cello. Brahms plays with rhythm in this movement more than the other movements, using syncopation between the clarinet and cello to transfer to the fourth theme of the movement.

== Reception ==
Eusebius Mandyczewski, a scholar and close friend of Brahms, praised the Clarinet Trio, writing that "It is as though the instruments were in love with each other."

Early commentators had mixed opinions about the Clarinet Trio, particularly regarding the Andantino grazioso movement. Near the turn of the twentieth century, English scholar John Alexander Fuller Maitland suggested that this movement "comes very near to the border of the commonplace" and that "Balfe himself might have written something very like it". In his 1933 analytical guide to Brahms' chamber music, Daniel Gregory Mason agreed with Fuller-Maitland, adding that "compared with the exquisite simplicity of so many of the intermezzi, this over-dressed tune is like the pretty peasant maiden who has spoiled herself, for a holiday at the fair, with finery and cosmetics". The harmonies shift abruptly or in a linear motion at times to support the folk-like melody given by the clarinet and cello, which is one reason Edwin Evans considers this movement is structurally unstable. Another reason this piece may be considered weak is that the writing for the clarinet and cello is intertwined in a way that they rely on one another: when the cello is playing may be in a spot where the clarinet has to breathe, or, contrarily, the clarinet may play when the cello must change their bowing or adjust their position. In the second movement, Brahms turns to his favoured leaps and arpeggiation in order to make the transition to a new theme. Some consider this a weak method of composition; however, it has also been noted that Brahms does this to accentuate the capabilities of the clarinet.

Despite the initial mixed reception and some music historians and scholars admitting that the trio is "not among the most interesting of his compositions", most listeners today find more to appreciate in the Andantino grazioso and the work as a whole. It is generally agreed that the Clarinet Trio is a notably serious and even grim work. Mason captured the essence of its mood in his description of the last page of the first movement: "Here sky as well as earth is gray; charm is not offered, it is not even expected or desired. In recompense for its absence we find a high, unyielding sincerity, a grave dignity, a kind of stoic Roman virtue." The Clarinet Trio has secured a place in the chamber music repertoire, showcasing Brahms' skill in writing for the clarinet and his ability to create emotionally rich works in his late career.
