= Richard Mühlfeld =

German clarinettist (1856–1907)

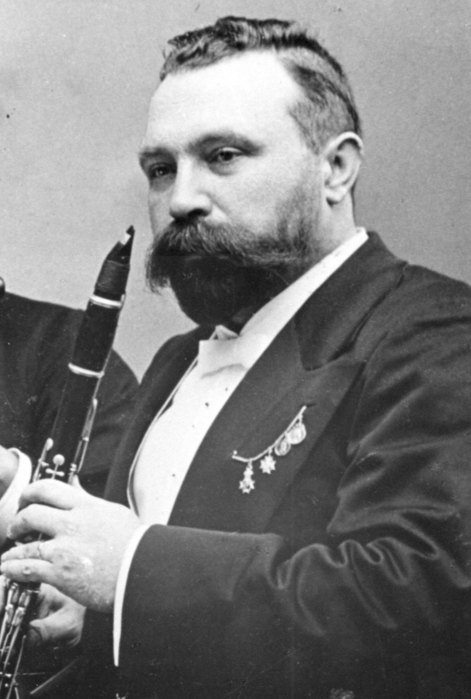
Richard Mühlfeld

Richard Bernhard Herrmann Mühlfeld (February 28, 1856 – June 1, 1907) was a German clarinettist who inspired Johannes Brahms and Gustav Jenner to write chamber works including the instrument. The pieces that Brahms wrote for him are the Clarinet Trio, the Clarinet Quintet, and the Clarinet Sonatas.

Born in Bad Salzungen, where as a youth he played in the spa orchestra, Mühlfeld originally joined the Meiningen Court Orchestra (Hofkapelle) as a violinist and changed to the clarinet three years later. Following the completion of Brahms's String Quintet No. 2 in G Major, Op. 111, the composer decided to end his compositional career. After Brahms listened to Mühlfeld play Weber's Clarinet Concerto No. 1 in F Minor, Mozart's Clarinet Quintet and some of Ludwig Spohr's works, his sound quality and musicianship inspired Brahms to start composing again. Brahms later wrote letters to his old friend Clara Schumann about the skill level he saw in this clarinettist's playing. Mühlfeld and Brahms soon became close friends. In appreciation of Mühlfeld's relationship to him, Brahms gave him a set of fine silver teaspoons with a monogram.

Although Mühlfeld played the Quintet along with the Trio at a concert in London, the debuts for those pieces were held at the Court of Meiningen in November 1891, with the Joachim Quartet playing the Quintet's string parts. Both Sonatas were performed for the Meiningen Circle at the Palace of Berchtesgaden in the summer of 1894, with Johannes Brahms playing piano.
