= Clarinet Sonatas (Brahms) =

Pair of works by Johannes Brahms

- by Johannes Brahms
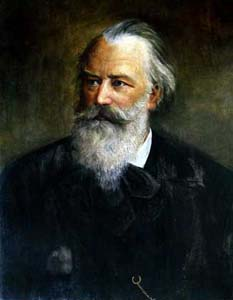
- The composer
- Opus: 120, No. 1 & 2
- Composed: 1894
- Dedication: Richard Mühlfeld
- Performed: 7 January 1895: Vienna
- Movements: four; three

The Clarinet Sonatas, Op. 120, Nos. 1 and 2, are a pair of works written for clarinet and piano by the Romantic composer Johannes Brahms. They were written in 1894 and are dedicated to the clarinetist Richard Mühlfeld.

The sonatas stem from a period late in Brahms's life where he discovered the beauty of the sound and tonal colour of the clarinet. The form of the clarinet sonata was largely undeveloped when Brahms wrote his, after which the combination of clarinet and piano was more readily used in composers’ new works. These were the last chamber pieces Brahms wrote before his death and are considered two of the great masterpieces in the clarinet repertoire. Brahms also produced a frequently performed transcription of these works for viola with alterations to better suit the instrument.

== Background ==
By 1890, Brahms vowed to retire from composing, but his promise was short lived. In January 1891 he made a trip to Meiningen for an arts festival and was captivated by performances of Carl Maria von Weber's Clarinet Concerto No. 1 and the Mozart Clarinet Quintet. The solo clarinetist was Richard Mühlfeld, and Brahms began a fond friendship with the man whom he so admired. The beautiful tone of “Fräulein Klarinette” (as Brahms would nickname Mühlfeld) inspired him to begin composing again less than a year after he retired.

The fruits of their friendship were four remarkable additions to the still modest clarinet repertoire of that time, including the trio in A minor for clarinet, cello and piano Op 114 (1891), the B minor quintet for clarinet and strings, Op. 115 (1891), and two clarinet sonatas. In July 1894, at his Bad Ischl retreat, Brahms completed the sonatas. He wrote to Mühlfeld on August 26, inviting him to Bad Ischl, to perform them, stating cryptically that "it would be splendid if you brought your B♭ clarinet." As Mühlfeld had other commitments that summer, he delayed responding, but went to Vienna in September to meet Brahms and to acquaint himself with the two sonatas. They were first performed (by Brahms and Mühlfeld) privately for Duke Georg and his family in September of that year. Brahms and Mühlfeld then performed them for Clara Schumann in November 1894, before their public premieres on January 7, 1895.

Brahms’ experience in writing his Clarinet Quintet three years earlier led him to compose the sonatas for clarinet and piano because he preferred the sound over that of clarinet with strings. The keys of the sonatas—F minor and E♭ major—correspond to the keys of the two clarinet concertos which Weber composed more than eighty years earlier.

== Sonata No. 1 in F minor ==
=== I. Allegro appassionato ===
F minor, in 3/4 time

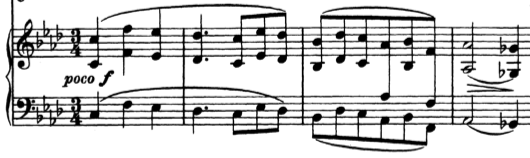
Piano introduction to the first movement.

The first movement is in sonata form. It begins with a solo piano introduction in three parallel octaves, outlining a recurring motif throughout the movement. The clarinet then enters with the slurred first theme. The piano takes over the theme, with the clarinet playing more of an embellishing role. It was normal in clarinet music before the sonatas for the soloist to play mostly, if not always, the melody. Brahms did not reduce the scope of the piano part to accommodate for the clarinet, but created a more equal and harmonious relationship between soloist and pianist. The quiet transition between the two themes is in D♭ major and features staggered entrances between the hands of the piano. The second theme introduces dotted rhythms and is marked marcato, contrasting with the first theme. It passes through many key areas quickly before finally resting on C minor.

The development begins by expanding on ideas heard in the introduction and transition. The piano plays with staggered hand entrances and joins the clarinet in recalling the second bar of the introduction. The music makes a false movement towards A♭ major, instead landing on E major. The introduction material takes over and winds down to pp. A subito forte evokes the second theme combined with staggered entrances from both piano hands and clarinet. The second theme is finally presented and leads to the recapitulation.

The introduction is restated forte in the key of C♯ minor. Brahms brings the key back around to F minor and the first theme, transition, and second theme are heard again. Tonally, this section does not stray far from F although the music goes through major and minor sections. A final statement of the first theme leads into the coda, marked Sostenuto ed espressivo. The coda is slower in tempo and based on material from the introduction. The movement ends quietly in F major.

=== II. Andante un poco adagio ===
A♭ major, in 2/4 time

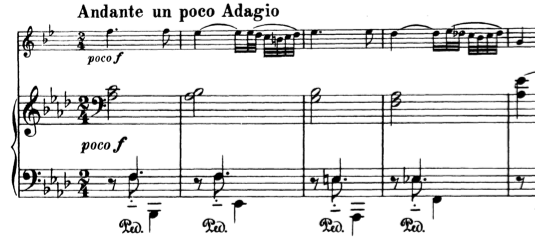
The descending theme in the clarinet at the opening of the second movement.

The second movement is in ternary form. The clarinet introduces a simple descending theme decorated with turns. The piano writing is sparse in the first theme area. This A section is repeated twice, once ending on a half cadence and the other with a perfect authentic cadence on the home key of A♭ major.

The B section is characterized by faster rhythmic and harmonic motion. The piano plays sixteenth notes outlining the harmonies while the clarinet continues playing a slurred melody. The harmony descends in an imitation of the A section melody through the keys D♭ major, C♭ major, and A major. The clarinet gets a chance to play the sixteenth notes that the piano had before the modulation to E major.

The A melody returns in the piano in the “wrong” key of E major, moves to C major, and finally back to the A♭ major. The A section is then restated in its entirety with a more active piano accompaniment. A short interlude of sixteenth notes in the piano alludes to the B section and a final iteration of the melody ends the movement.

=== III. Allegretto grazioso ===
A♭ major, in 3/4 time

The third movement is also in ternary form. The A section consists of an eight bar melody in the "wrong key" of E-flat major played by the clarinet, and then traded off to the piano with the clarinet lending supporting lines. A forte repeated section in the home key inverts the melody and the second ending leads to the B section.

The piano takes up a descending line syncopated between the two hands while the clarinet adds a low supporting line confined within the space of a minor third. Another repeated section lets the clarinet play the descending melody. After the repeat, the melody from the A section returns and ends the movement.

=== IV. Vivace ===
F major, alla breve

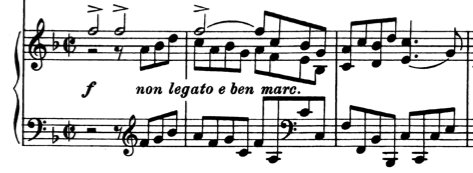
Introduction to the last movement of the sonata.

The fourth movement is in an altered rondo form that can be described as A–B–A′–C–B′–A″. The movement begins with three accented Fs in a piano introduction serving as a sort of call to identify the first theme. The A theme is marked leggero in the clarinet and is mostly eighth notes in stepwise motion. The contrasting B theme is made up of quarter note triplets and is more slurred and leisurely. After a bombastic return to A′, the quiet C theme is played in the piano and then handed off to the clarinet. The clarinet then plays the “call” from the introduction while the piano states the B theme again. Finally, the final A″ section ends with a coda and the sonata is finished in F major.

Luciano Berio is known to have orchestrated and reworked the whole sonata for orchestra in 1986. The resulting composition was entitled Op. 120, No. 1, as a clear reference to the original work's catalogue number.

== Sonata No. 2 in E♭ major ==
=== I. Allegro amabile ===
E♭ major in 4/4 time

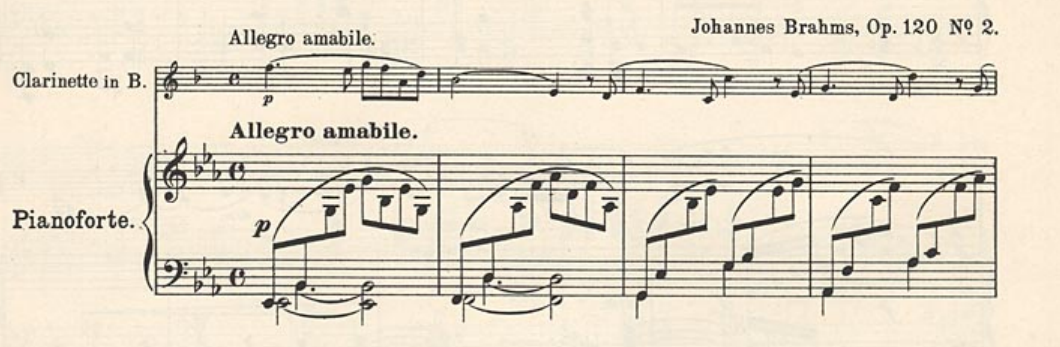
The first four bars of the introductory theme of movement I of Brahms' Sonata No. 2 in E-flat major Op. 120

The first movement of Sonata No. 2 is likewise in sonata form. It begins with a solo clarinet introduction while the piano is accompanying underneath the clarinet. The piano opens with broken chords and helps the clarinet soloist in outlining a recurring motif throughout the movement. The opening clarinet theme is played for twenty-one measures before a secondary theme is introduced by the soloist in measure twenty-two in the key of B ♭ major.

This secondary theme is played in sotto voce manner and is intentionally more intimate than the opening theme. For the secondary theme, Brahms utilizes a Canon-like composition in which the clarinet and piano have the same melodic idea but slightly offset from each other to create a unique interplay between the two instruments.

At measure forty-eight, the development of the movement begins and is uniquely broken up into four major sections. The first part of the development begins with the clarinet playing a series of two notes before finally landing on the opening theme stated at the beginning of the movement. At measure sixty-five, the piano picks up the secondary theme in G minor presented earlier while the clarinet sustains half notes and serves as a bass pedal tone for the piano melody, marking the second of the four sections of the development. The third section of the development is marked by a unique interplay between the clarinet soloist and the piano. The pianist plays the first four notes of the opening theme followed by the clarinet playing the remaining notes of the motif and ending with a triplet-quarter note figure. The fourth and final section of the development begins on the pickups of measure eighty-six with the piano playing triplet figures while the clarinet plays another motif from the opening theme.

Following the development section, the movement picks up with the recapitulation with a restatement of the primary theme in the exposition. The two themes are both presented in E♭ major as opposed to the first time they are played (E♭ and B♭ respectively). After each theme is restated, Brahms continues into another "development" section but fails to fully evolve into a fully-fleshed out development section. Instead, Brahms converts this second development section into a coda and moves towards the end of the first movement. In the coda section starting in measure 158, the clarinet has descending triplet figures while the piano has eighth note supporting rhythms before ending in our home key of E♭ major.

=== II. Allegro appassionato ===
E♭ minor in 3/4 time

=== III. Andante con moto - Allegro ===
E♭ major in 6/8 time
