= Movement (music) =

Self-contained part of a musical composition or form

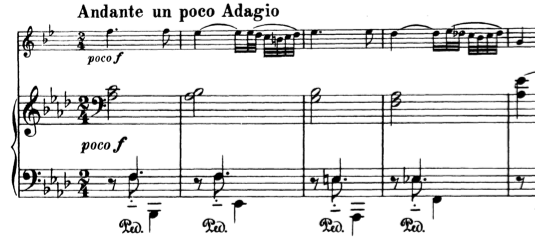
Opening of the second movement to Johannes Brahms’s Clarinet Sonata no. 1 (1894)

A movement is a self-contained part of a musical composition or musical form. While individual or selected movements from a composition are sometimes performed separately as stand-alone pieces, a performance of the complete work requires all the movements to be performed in succession. A movement is a section, "a major structural unit perceived as the result of the coincidence of relatively large numbers of structural phenomena".

A unit of a larger work that may stand by itself as a complete composition. Such divisions are usually self-contained. Most often the sequence of movements is arranged fast-slow-fast or in some other order that provides contrast.

— Benward & Saker (2009), Music in Theory and Practice: Volume II

While the ultimate harmonic goal of a tonal composition is the final tonic triad, there will also be many interior harmonic goals found within the piece, some of them tonic triads and some of them not. ...We use the term cadence to mean a harmonic goal, specifically the chords used at the goal.
