= List of compositions by Johannes Brahms =

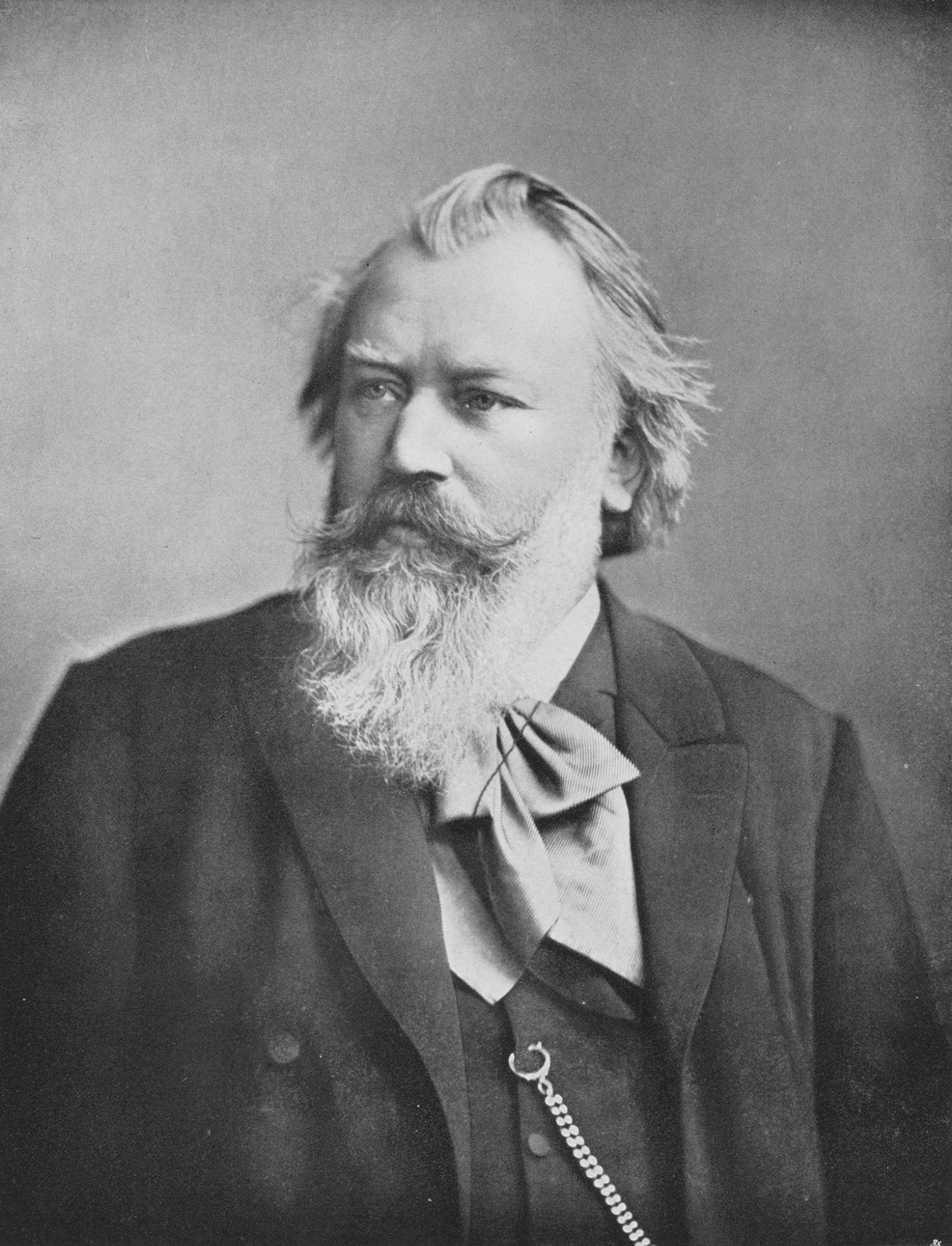
Photograph of Brahms

The following is a list of compositions by Johannes Brahms, classified by genre and type of work.

#	Title	Scoring	Date	Notes
== Orchestral works ==
=== Symphonies ===
Op. 68	Symphony No. 1 in C minor	orchestra	1854–76	arr. for piano 4-hands 1877
Op. 73	Symphony No. 2 in D major	orchestra	1877	arr. for piano 4-hands 1877; arr. for 2 pianos published 1891 (not by Brahms?)
Op. 90	Symphony No. 3 in F major	orchestra	1883	arr. for piano 4-hands 1883; arr. for 2 pianos 1884
Op. 98	Symphony No. 4 in E minor	orchestra	1884–85	arr. for piano 4-hands 1886; arr. for 2 pianos 1887
=== Serenades ===
Op. 11	Serenade No. 1 in D major	orchestra	1857–58	original version for wind/string octet 1857 (discarded), 2nd version for chamber nonet 1857 (lost); revised for chamber orchestra 1858 (lost); revised and adapted for full orchestra 1858–59; arr. for piano 4-hands 1859–60
Op. 16	Serenade No. 2 in A major	orchestra	1858–59	original version for full orchestra 1858 (lost?), 2nd version for chamber orchestra (no violin/trumpet/trombone/percussion) 1859; revised 1875; arr. for piano 4-hands 1875
=== Overtures ===
Op. 80	Academic Festival Overture	orchestra	1880	arr. for piano 4-hands 1880
Op. 81	Tragic Overture	orchestra	1880	arr. for piano 4-hands 1880
=== Other orchestral works ===
Op. 56a	Variations on a Theme by Haydn ("Saint Anthony Variations")	orchestra	1873	orchestration of Op. 56b
W. 1	Ungarische Tänze ("Hungarian Dances"): 1. Hungarian Dance in G minor 2. Hungarian Dance in F major 3. Hungarian Dance in E major	orchestra	1873	orchestration of Nos. 1, 3 and 10 of W. 1
=== Piano concertos ===
Op. 15	Piano Concerto No. 1 in D minor	piano, orchestra	1854–58	original version as Sonata for Two Pianos 1854 (Mvts 2 & 3 are Anh. 2a/2) (discarded), 2nd version as Symphony in D minor in 4 movements (4th mvt never written) 1854–55 (Mvts 2 & 3 are Anh. 2a/2) (discarded), final version (Piano Concerto) in 3 movements (only 1st mvt from previous versions, 2nd & 3rd mvts new) 1855–58; two piano version 1855–56; revised 1859; r. for piano 4-hands 1864
Op. 83	Piano Concerto No. 2 in B♭ major	piano, orchestra	1878–81	4 mvts; middle two mvts (Scherzo & Andante) arr. from the discarded middle two mvts (Anh. 2a/1) of the original version of the Violin Concerto Op. 77; arr. for 2 pianos 1881; cello solo theme of 3rd mvt arr. 1886 as a song Immer leiser wird mein Schlummer Op. 105 No. 2
=== Other concertos ===
Op. 77	Violin Concerto in D major	violin, orchestra	1878	original version in 4 mvts, final version in 3 mvts: the previous middle two mvts (Scherzo & Andante, Anh. 2a/1) were removed and replaced by a single Adagio; original version's two discarded middle mvts incorporated into Piano Concerto No. 2 Op. 83; arr. for violin and piano 1878
Op. 102	Double Concerto in A minor	violin, cello, orchestra	1887	
== Chamber works ==
=== Sonatas ===
==== Violin sonatas ====
W. 2	Scherzo in C minor	violin, piano	1853	written as the 3rd mvt of the F-A-E Sonata, the other 3 mvts written by Robert Schumann and Albert Dietrich; Brahms' Scherzo published 1927 (entire Sonata published 1935)
Op. 78	Violin Sonata No. 1 in G major ("Rain Sonata")	violin, piano	1878–79	the main recurring (cyclic) theme of all 3 mvts is taken from the common theme of two songs: Regenlied ("Rain song") & Nachklang ("Echo") Op. 59 Nos. 3 & 4
Op. 100	Violin Sonata No. 2 in A major	violin, piano	1886	themes from the songs Op. 63 No. 5, Op. 97 No. 5, Op. 105 Nos. 1, 2, and 4 are used throughout the sonata
Op. 108	Violin Sonata No. 3 in D minor	violin, piano	1886–88	4 mvts
==== Cello sonatas ====
Op. 38	Cello Sonata No. 1 in E minor	cello, piano	1862 & 65 I–III: 1862; IV: 1865	originally 4 mvts, the 2nd mvt Adagio (Anh. 2a/9) was discarded, leaving the 3rd mvt Minuet to become the 2nd mvt; 3 mvt version arr. for viola and piano 1887
Op. 99	Cello Sonata No. 2 in F major	cello, piano	1886	
==== Clarinet sonatas ====
Op. 120	2 Clarinet Sonatas: 1. Clarinet Sonata No. 1 in F minor 2. Clarinet Sonata No. 2 in E♭ major	clarinet, piano	1894	alternate version: clarinet part may be played by violin; arr. for viola and piano 1895
=== Piano and strings ===
==== Piano trios ====
A. 4/5	Piano Trio in A major	piano, violin, cello	1853–55	discovered 1924; authorship doubtful, attributed to Brahms as an early composition, possibly written by Albert Dietrich; published 1938
Op. 8	Piano Trio No. 1 in B major/minor	piano, violin, cello	1854, 2nd version 1889;	Brahms wrote several other Piano Trios prior to November 1854 (Anh. 2a/6) when this one was published, including likely another composed concurrent with this one, all destroyed
Op. 87	Piano Trio No. 2 in C major	piano, violin, cello	1880 & 82	Brahms wrote another Piano Trio concurrent to this one, in E♭ major (Anh. 2a/7); in 1880 he had completed the 1st mvt Allegros of each, but they were put aside until 1882, when the E♭ major Trio was destroyed and this Trio's remaining 3 mvts were written
Op. 101	Piano Trio No. 3 in C minor	piano, violin, cello	1886	
==== Piano quartets ====
Op. 25	Piano Quartet No. 1 in G minor	piano, violin, viola, cello	1856–61	arr. for piano 4-hands 1870
Op. 26	Piano Quartet No. 2 in A major	piano, violin, viola, cello	1861	arr. for piano 4-hands 1872
Op. 60	Piano Quartet No. 3 in C minor ("Werther Quartet")	piano, violin, viola, cello	1856–75	
==== Piano quintets ====
Op. 34	Piano Quintet in F minor	piano, 2 violins, viola, cello	1864	original version as String Quintet for 2 violins, viola, 2 cellos written 1862 (destroyed later), 2nd version as Sonata for Two Pianos Op. 34 written 1863
=== Clarinet ===
Op. 114	Clarinet Trio in A minor	clarinet, cello, piano	1891	alternate versions: clarinet part may be played by viola or violin
Op. 115	Clarinet Quintet in B minor	clarinet, 2 violins, viola, cello	1891	
=== Horn ===
Op. 40	Horn Trio in E♭ major	horn (natural, in E♭), violin, piano	1865	theme of Trio section of 2nd mvt Scherzo taken from Albumblatt written 1853; alternate versions: original ms specifies horn part may be played by cello; also later (1884 publication) by viola
A. 4/1	12 Etudes	trumpet or horn		authorship doubtful
=== String ensembles ===
==== String trios ====
A. 3/1	Trio "Hymn in Veneration of the Great Joachim" in A major	2 violins, cello/double bass	1853	
==== String quartets ====
Op. 51	2 String Quartets: 1. String Quartet No. 1 in C minor 2. String Quartet No. 2 in A minor	2 violins, viola, cello	1865–73	Brahms wrote 20 String Quartets prior to these two (Anh. 2a/5), all destroyed; both arr. for piano 4-hands 1873
Op. 67	String Quartet No. 3 in B♭ major	2 violins, viola, cello	1875	arr. for piano 4-hands 1875
==== String quintets ====
Op. 88	String Quintet No. 1 in F major	2 violins, 2 violas, cello	1882	arr. for piano 4-hands 1882
Op. 111	String Quintet No. 2 in G major (Prater)	2 violins, 2 violas, cello	1890	arr. for piano 4-hands 1890
==== String sextets ====
Op. 18	String Sextet No. 1 in B♭ major	2 violins, 2 violas, 2 cellos	1860	2nd mvt arr. for piano solo in 1860 as Theme and Variations in D minor Op. 18b; arr. for piano 4-hands 1860–61
Op. 36	String Sextet No. 2 in G major	2 violins, 2 violas, 2 cellos	1864–65	arr. for piano 4-hands 1865–66
== Keyboard works ==
=== Piano solo ===
==== Piano sonatas ====
Op. 2	Piano Sonata No. 2 in F♯ minor	piano	1852	2nd mvt is a theme and variations on the old German Minnelied Mir ist leide
Op. 1	Piano Sonata No. 1 in C major	piano	1853	2nd mvt is a theme and variations on the old German Minnelied Verstohlen geht der Mond auf, later set for female chorus and piano as Ständchen WoO 38 No. 20; the ms is entitled Sonata No. 4; as Op. 2 was written before this one, Brahms wrote two other Piano Sonatas prior to this (Anh. 2a/15) that he destroyed
Op. 5	Piano Sonata No. 3 in F minor	piano	1853	
==== Variations ====
Op. 9	Variations on a Theme by Robert Schumann in F♯ minor	piano	1854	
Op. 21	2 Sets of Variations: 1. 11 Variations on an Original Theme in D major 2. 13 Variations on a Hungarian Melody in D major	piano	1854 & 57: 1. 1857; 2. 1854	
Op. 18b	Theme and Variations in D minor	piano	1860	transcription of 2nd mvt of String Sextet No. 1 Op. 18; published 1927
Op. 24	Variations and Fugue on a Theme by Handel in B♭ major ("Handel Variations")	piano	1861	
Op. 35	Etudes for Piano: Variations on a Theme of Paganini	piano	1863	
A. 3/6	Variation on a Theme by Schumann in F♯ minor	piano	1868	
==== Character pieces ====
Op. 4	Scherzo in E♭ minor	piano	1851	
Op. 10	4 Ballades: 1. Ballade in D minor 2. Ballade in D major 3. Ballade in B minor 4. Ballade in B major	piano	1854	
A. 1a/7	Robert Schumann: Piano Quintet (Op. 44): Scherzo (arr. by JB)	piano	1854	
W. 3	2 Gavottes: 1. Gavotte in A major 2. Gavotte in A minor	piano	1855	
W. 4	2 Gigues: 1. Gigue in A minor 2. Gigue in B minor	piano	1855	published 1927
W. 5	2 Sarabandes: 1. Sarabande in A minor 2. Sarabande in B minor	piano	1854–55	published 1917
A. 3/3	Kreis Kanon ("Circle Canon")	piano	1856	
A. 3/2	Canon in F minor	piano	1864	
A. 3/5	Canon in D minor, on the theme of Robert Schumann's Waltz from Papillons (Op. 2 No. 7)	piano		
A. 1a/2	Christoph Willibald Gluck: Iphigénie en Aulide, Act II: Gavotte in A major (arr. by JB)	piano	1871	published 1872
Op. 76	8 Pieces for Piano: 1. Capriccio in F♯ minor 2. Capriccio in B minor 3. Intermezzo in A♭ major 4. Intermezzo in B♭ major 5. Capriccio in C♯ minor 6. Intermezzo in A major 7. Intermezzo in A minor 8. Capriccio in C major	piano	1878	
Op. 79	2 Rhapsodies: 1. Rhapsody in B minor 2. Rhapsody in G minor	piano	1879	
Op. 116	7 Fantasies: 1. Capriccio in D minor 2. Intermezzo in A minor 3. Capriccio in G minor 4. Intermezzo in E major 5. Intermezzo in E minor 6. Intermezzo in E major 7. Capriccio in D minor	piano	1892	
Op. 117	3 Intermezzi: 1. Intermezzo in E♭ major 2. Intermezzo in B♭ minor 3. Intermezzo in C♯ minor	piano	1892	
Op. 118	6 Pieces for Piano: 1. Intermezzo in A minor 2. Intermezzo in A major 3. Ballade in G minor 4. Intermezzo in F minor 5. Romance in F major 6. Intermezzo in E♭ minor	piano	1893	
Op. 119	4 Pieces for Piano: 1. Intermezzo in B minor (Adagio); 2. Intermezzo in E minor (Andantino un poco agitato); 3. Intermezzo in C major (Grazioso e giocoso); 4. Rhapsody in E♭ major (Allegro risoluto)	piano	1893	
==== Studies ====
A. 1a/1 Book 1	Studien (2 "Studies") Book 1: 1. Etude after Frédéric Chopin (Etude in F minor, Op. 25: No. 2); 2. Rondo after Carl Maria von Weber (Piano Sonata No. 1 in C major, Op. 24: Finale)	piano	1852 & 62: 1. 1852; 2. 1862	published 1869
A. 1a/1 Book 2	Studien (3 "Studies") Book 2: 3. Presto after J.S. Bach (Violin Sonata No. 1 in G minor, BWV 1001: Finale) (1st Version); 4. Presto after J.S. Bach (Violin Sonata No. 1 in G minor, BWV 1001: Finale) (2nd Version); 5. Chaconne by J.S. Bach (Violin Partita No. 2 in D minor, BWV 1004: Chaconne) (arr. for left hand alone)	piano	1877	published 1878
A. 4/2	Study for the Left Hand, arr. of Franz Schubert's Impromptu in E♭ (Op. 90 No. 2, D. 899 No. 2)	piano		despite the title, this is for two-hands: the "exercise" is for the dexterity of the left hand and basically consists of Schubert's treble (RH) and bass (LH) staves swapped; authorship doubtful, possibly spurious, attributed to Brahms; published 1927
W. 6	51 Übungen ("51 Exercises")	piano	1850–93	published 1893
==== Cadenzas ====
W. 11	Cadenza for J.S. Bach's Concerto No. 1 in D minor (BWV 1052)	harpsichord or piano	1855–61	published 1927
A. 4/7	Cadenza for Ludwig van Beethoven's Piano Concerto No. 3 in C minor (Opus 37): 1st mvt	piano		spurious, misattributed to Brahms, actually composed by Ignaz Moscheles; published 1927
W. 12	2 Cadenzas for Ludwig van Beethoven's Piano Concerto No. 4 in G major (Opus 58): Cadenza for 1st mvt; Cadenza for 3rd mvt	piano	1855–61	published 1927
W. 13	2 Cadenzas for Wolfgang Amadeus Mozart's Piano Concerto No. 17 in G major (K. 453): Cadenza for 1st mvt; Cadenza for 2nd mvt	piano	1855–61	published 1927
A. 4/4	Cadenza for Wolfgang Amadeus Mozart's Piano Concerto No. 20 in D minor (K. 466): 1st mvt	piano		authorship doubtful
W. 14	Cadenza for Wolfgang Amadeus Mozart's Piano Concerto No. 20 in D minor (K. 466)	piano	1855–61	published 1927
W. 15	Cadenza for Wolfgang Amadeus Mozart's Piano Concerto No. 24 in C minor (K. 491)	piano	1855–61	published 1927
==== Other piano works ====
A. deest	Française, on favourite opera themes: 1. La Visite; 2. La Gracieuse; 3. La Pastourelle; 4. La Giraffe; 5. La Prisonnière	piano	1836	spurious, published 1836 by the pseudonymous composer "G. W. Marks", misattributed to Brahms (he was 3 years old at the time this was written and published)
A. 3/10	Rákóczy March	piano	1853	incomplete, fragment
A. deest	Albumblatt ("Album Leaf") in A minor (Allegro con espressioni)	piano	1853	discovered April 2011, premiered by Craig Sheppard April 2011, published January 2012; theme used in Trio section of 2nd mvt Scherzo of Horn Trio Op. 40
A. 2a/14	Suite in A minor	piano	1855	unfinished: Prelude and Aria only; formerly lost
A. 3/4	Piano Piece in B♭ major	piano	1859–62	
=== Piano duo ===
==== Piano four-hands ====
A. 4/6	Souvenir de la Russie: 1. Hymne nationale russe de Lvoff (arr. of the Russian national anthem "God Save the Tsar" by Aleksey Lvov); 2. Chansonette de Titoff (arr. of the song "The Branch" by Nikolai Titov); 3. Romance de Warlamoff (arr. of the song "Don't You Wake Her at Dawn" by Aleksandr Varlamov); 4. Le Rossignol de A. Alabieff (arr. of the song "The Nightingale" by Aleksandr Alyabyev); 5. Chant bohémien (arr. of the Bohemian folksong "There's a Big Village on the Road"); 6. Chant bohémien: "Kosa" (arr. of the Bohemian folksong "The Plait")	piano 4-hands	1852	published as Transcriptions en forme de fantaisies sur des airs russes et bohémiens as "Op. 151" of the pseudonymous composer "G. W. Marks", probably misattributed to Brahms; published 1852
A. 1a/3	Joseph Joachim: Hamlet Overture (Op. 4) (arr. by JB)	piano 4-hands	1853–54	
A. 1a/8	Robert Schumann: Piano Quartet (Op. 47) (arr. by JB)	piano 4-hands	1855	published 1864
A. 2b/5	Robert Schumann: Piano Quintet (Op. 44) (arr. by JB)	piano 4-hands	1857	lost?; a piano duet arrangement of this Quintet exists and has been published (mis?)attributed to Clara Schumann, which is likely this one by Brahms; Brahms is known to have given his manuscript to Clara in 1857, who edited it and made some small revisions; it isn't likely that she would then make a whole completely new version of her own from scratch
Op. 23	Variations on a Theme by Schumann ("Schumann Variations")	piano 4-hands	1861	
Op. 39	16 Waltzes: 1. Waltz in B major 2. Waltz in E major 3. Waltz in G♯ minor 4. Waltz in E minor 5. Waltz in E major 6. Waltz in C♯ major 7. Waltz in C♯ minor 8. Waltz in B♭ major 9. Waltz in D minor 10. Waltz in G major 11. Waltz in B minor 12. Waltz in E major 13. Waltz in C major 14. Waltz in A minor 15. Waltz in A major 16. Waltz in D minor	piano 4-hands	1865	arr. for piano solo 1865 (keys for Nos. 13–16 transposed half-step down); simplified arr. for piano solo 1865 (key for No. 6 transposed half-step down); arr. for 2-pianos (unfinished, only Nos. 1, 2, 11, 14, 15 completed) (keys for Nos. 14 & 15 transposed half-step down)
W. 1 Book 1–2	Ungarische Tänze (10 "Hungarian Dances") Book 1: 1. Hungarian Dance in G minor 2. Hungarian Dance in D minor 3. Hungarian Dance in F major 4. Hungarian Dance in F minor 5. Hungarian Dance in F♯ minor; Book 2: 6. Hungarian Dance in D♭ major 7. Hungarian Dance in A major 8. Hungarian Dance in A minor 9. Hungarian Dance in E minor 10. Hungarian Dance in E major	piano 4-hands	1858–68	published 1869; arr. for piano solo in 1872; Nos. 1, 3, 10 arr. for orchestra in 1873
A. 1a/6	Franz Schubert: 20 Ländler 1–16. 17 Ländler for piano solo (D. 366): Nos. 1–16 (arr. by JB) 17–20. 4 Ländler for piano 4-hands (D. 814) (arr. by JB)	1–16. piano 4-hands 17–20. piano	1869	D. 366 No. 17 for piano solo is the same Ländler as D. 814 No. 1 for piano duet; #17 in Brahms' set is a piano solo arr. of D. 814 No. 1, though markedly different from Schubert's piano solo version D. 366 No. 17; published 1869
A. deest	Christoph Willibald Gluck: Paride ed Elena: Gavotte in A major (arr. by JB)	piano 4-hands		published 1901
Op. 52a	Liebeslieder-Walzer ("Love Song Waltzes")	piano 4-hands	1874	arr. of Op. 52
Op. 65a	Neue Liebeslieder ("New Love Songs")	piano 4-hands	1875	arr. of Op. 65
W. 1 Book 3–4	Ungarische Tänze (11 "Hungarian Dances") Book 3: 11. Hungarian Dance in D minor 12. Hungarian Dance in D minor 13. Hungarian Dance in D major 14. Hungarian Dance in D minor 15. Hungarian Dance in B♭ major 16. Hungarian Dance in F minor; Book 4: 17. Hungarian Dance in F♯ minor 18. Hungarian Dance in D major 19. Hungarian Dance in B minor 20. Hungarian Dance in E minor 21. Hungarian Dance in E minor	piano 4-hands	1879	published 1880
==== Two pianos ====
A. 1a/5	Joseph Joachim: Heinrich IV Overture (Op. 7) (arr. by JB)	2-pianos	1855	published 1902
A. 1a/4	Joseph Joachim: Demetrius Overture (Op. 6) (arr. by JB)	2-pianos	1856	
Op. 34b	Sonata for Two Pianos in F minor	2-pianos	1863	original version as String Quintet for 2 violins, viola, 2 cellos written 1862 (destroyed later), 3rd version as Piano Quintet Op. 34 written 1864
Op. 56b	Variations on a Theme by Haydn ("Saint Anthony Variations")	2-pianos	1873	orchestrated as Op. 56a
=== Organ ===
A. 3/9	Henry Charles Litolff: Le Dernier Jour de la Terreur, symphonic drama (Op. 55) (arr. by JB)	harmonium or piano	1852	fragment; Litolff's composition was later retitled and styled "Maximilien Robespierre, tragic overture"
W. 8	Fugue in A♭ minor	organ	1856	published 1864
W. 9	Prelude and Fugue in A minor	organ	1856	published 1927
W. 10	Prelude and Fugue in G minor	organ	1857	published 1927
W. 7	Chorale Prelude and Fugue on O Traurigkeit, o Herzeleid	organ	Prelude: 1858; Fugue: 1873	published 1882
Op. 122	11 Chorale Preludes: 1. Mein Jesu, der du mich 2. Herzliebster Jesu, was hast du verbrochen 3. O Welt, ich muss dich lassen ("Oh World, I Must Leave You") (1); 4. Herzlich tut mich erfreuen 5. Schmücke dich, o liebe Seele; 6. O wie selig seid ihr doch, ihr Frommen; 7. O Gott, du frommer Gott; 8. Es ist ein Ros entsprungen 9. Herzlich tut mich verlangen ("Heartily Do I Request") (1); 10. Herzlich tut mich verlangen (2); 11. O Welt, ich muss dich lassen (2)	organ	1896	
== Vocal works ==
=== One voice ===
==== Art songs ====
Op. 3	6 Songs: 1. Liebestreu ("Love's Devotion"); 2. Liebe und Frühling ("Love and Spring") (1); 3. Liebe und Frühling ("Love and Spring") (2); 4. Lied ("Song"); 5. In der Fremde ("Away from Home"); 6. Lied ("Song")	voice, piano	1853	
Op. 6	6 Songs: 1. Spanisches Lied ("Spanish Song"); 2. Der Frühling ("The Spring"); 3. Nachwirkung ("Aftermath"); 4. Juchhe! ("Whoop!"); 5. Wie die Wolke nach der Sonne ("Like the Cloud to the Sun"); 6. Nachtigallen schwingen lustig ("Nightingales Swing Happily")	voice, piano	1852–53	
Op. 7	6 Songs: 1. Treue Liebe ("True Love"); 2. Parole ("Word"); 3. Anklänge ("Echoes"); 4. Volkslied ("Folk Song"); 5. Die Trauernde ("The Mourner"); 6. Heimkehr ("Homecoming")	voice, piano	1851–53 1–2,4–5: 1852; 3: 1853; 6: 1851	
W. 21	Mondnacht, song	voice, piano	1853	published 1854
A. 3/11	Franz Schubert: Nachtstück (Op. 36 No. 2, D. 672) (arr. by JB)	voice, piano or harp, orchestra		fragment
A. 3/13	Die Müllerin ("The Miller")	voice, piano	1853	incomplete
W. 27	Spruch, canon	voice, viola	1854–55	published 1927
Op. 14	8 Songs and Romances: 1. Vor dem Fenster ("At the Window"); 2. Vom verwundeten Knaben ("About the Wounded Boy"); 3. Murrays Ermordung ("Murray's Murder"); 4. Ein Sonnett ("A Sonnet"); 5. Trennung ("Separation"); 6. Gang zur Liebsten ("Visit to My Beloved"); 7. Ständchen ("Serenade"); 8. Sehnsucht ("Longing")	voice, piano	1858	No. 8 arr. for female chorus 1859–62 published 1968
Op. 19	5 Poems: 1. Der Kuss ("The Kiss"); 2. Scheiden und meiden ("Separations and Avoidances"); 3. In der Ferne ("At the Distance"); 4. Der Schmied ("The Blacksmith"); 5. An eine Aeolsharfe ("To an Aeolian Harp")	voice, piano	1858–59	
Op. 33; Book 1–2	Romanzen aus L. Tieck's Magelone (Romanzen aus Magelone), song cycle, (Magelone-Lieder or Die Schöne Magelone) (6 "Magelone Romances" or "Magelone Songs") Book 1: 1. Keinen hat es noch gereut ("No One Has Yet Regretted"); 2. Traun! Bogen und Pfeil sind gut für den Feind ("Ho! Bows and Arrows Are Meet for the Foe"); 3. Sind es Schmerzen, sind es Freuden ("Are They Sorrows, Are They Pleasures?"); Book 2: 4. Liebe kam aus fernen Landen ("Love Came from Distant Lands"); 5. So willst du des Armen? ("Will You Graciously Pity?"); 6. Wie soll ich die Freude, die Wonne denn tragen? ("How Am I Then to Bear the Joy, the Rapture?")	voice, piano	1861–62 1–4: 1861; 5–6: 1862	published 1865
A. 1a/12	Franz Schubert: An Schwager Kronos, song (Op. 19 No. 1, D. 369) (arr. by JB)	bass, orchestra	1862	
A. 1a/13	Franz Schubert: Memnon, song (Op. 6 No. 1, D. 541) (arr. by JB)	voice, orchestra	1862	
A. 1a/15	Franz Schubert: Geheimes, song (Op. 14 No. 2, D. 719) (arr. by JB)	voice, horn, strings	1862	
A. 1a/16	Franz Schubert: Greisengesang, song (Op. 60 No. 1, D. 778) (arr. by JB)	bass, orchestra	1862	
A. 1a/18	Franz Schubert: Ellens Gesang II (Op. 52 No. 2, D. 838) (arr. by JB)	soprano, 4 horns, 2 bassoons	1862	1st version
Op. 32	9 Songs: 1. Wie rafft ich mich auf in der Nacht ("How I Sprang Up in the Night"); 2. Nicht mehr zu dir zu gehen ("Nowhere for You to Go"); 3. Ich schleich umher ("I Creep About"); 4. Der Strom, der neben mir verrauschte ("The Current, Which Rustled Next to Me"); 5. Wehe, so willst du mich wieder ("Woe, So You Want Me Again"); 6. Du sprichst, dass ich mich täuschte ("You Say, That I Deceived Myself"); 7. Bitteres zu sagen denkst du ("You Meant to Say Bitterness"); 8. So stehn wir, ich und meine Weide ("So We Stand, I and My Pasture"); 9. Wie bist du, meine Königin ("How Are You, My Queen")	voice, piano	1864	
Op. 43	4 Songs: 1. Von ewiger Liebe ("For Eternal Love"); 2. Die Mainacht ("The May Night"); 3. Ich schwing mein Horn ins Jammerthal ("I Sound My Horn in the Valley of Sorrow"); 4. Das Lied vom Herrn von Falkenstein ("The Song of the Mister from Falconstone")	voice, piano	1860–66	
Op. 46	4 Songs: 1. Die Kränze ("The Wreaths"); 2. Magyarisch ("Hungarian"); 3. Die Schale der Vergessenheit ("The Shell of Oblivion"); 4. An die Nachtigall ("To the Nightingale")	voice, piano	1864–68	
Op. 47	5 Songs: 1. Botschaft ("Message"); 2. Liebesglut ("The Fervor of Love"); 3. Sonntag ("Sunday"); 4. O liebliche Wangen ("O Beloved Cheeks"); 5. Die liebende Schreibt ("The Enamoured Writes")	voice, piano	1858–68 1, 2, 4: 1868; 3: 1859-60; 5: 1858	No. 3 arr. for 3-part female chorus 1859–62 published 1968
Op. 48	7 Songs: 1. Der Gang zum Liebchen ("The Visit to the Beloved"); 2. Der Überläufer ("The Renegade"); 3. Liebesklage des Mädchen ("The Love Laments of the Maiden"); 4. Gold überwiegt die Liebe ("Gold Prevails Over Love"); 5. Trost in Tränen ("Comfort in Tears"); 6. Vergangen ist mir Glück und Heil ("Past Is My Luck and Well-being"); 7. Herbstgefühl ("Autumn Mood")	voice, piano	1853–68 1: 1859–62; 2: 1853; 3 & 6: 1859–60; 4: 1868; 5: 1858; 7: 1867	No. 1 arr. for female chorus 1859–62 published 1968
Op. 49	5 Songs: 1. Am Sonntag Morgen ("On Sunday Morning"); 2. An ein Veilchen ("To a Violet"); 3. Sehnsucht ("Longing"); 4. Wiegenlied ("Cradle Song") (Brahms' Lullaby); 5. Abenddämmerung ("Twilight")	voice, piano	1867–68 1–5: 1868, 6: 1867	
A. deest	Albumblatt für Clara Schumann ("Hoch auf'm Berg, tief im Tal, grüß' ich dich vieltausendmal!") ("High on the mountain, deep in the valley, I greet you many thousands of times!") in C major (Adagio)	voice	1868	consists of 10 bars of a single line melody with no chords, and the text; ms dated Sep. 12, 1868, given to Clara S. on her birthday; melody used in 4th mvt of Symphony No. 1 Op. 68
Op. 33; Book 3–5	Romanzen aus L. Tieck's Magelone (Romanzen aus Magelone), song cycle, (Magelone-Lieder or Die Schöne Magelone) (9 "Magelone Romances" or "Magelone Songs") Book 3: 7. War es dir, dem diese Lippen bebten ("Was It You, for Whom These Lips Trembled?"); 8. Wir müssen uns trennen ("We Must Part (Beloved Lute)"); 9. Ruhe, Süßliebchen ("Rest, Sweet Love"); Book 4: 10. Verzweiflung (So tönet denn, schäumende Wellen) ("Despair (So Resound Then, Foaming Waves)"); 11. Wie schnell verschwindet so Licht als Glanz ("How Quickly Vanish Light and Radiance"); 12. Muß es eine Trennung geben ("Must There Be a Parting?"); Book 5: 13. Sulima (Geliebter, wo zaudert dein irrender Fuß?) ("Sulima (Beloved, Where Do Your Wandering Feet Now Stray?)"); 14. Wie froh und frisch ("How Glad and Strong"); 15. Treue Liebe dauert lange ("True Love Lasts Long")	voice, piano	1862–69 7: 1864; 8: 1865; 9: 1868; 10: 1866; 11,14–15: 1869; 12–13: 1862	published 1869
Op. 57	8 Songs: 1. Von waldbekränzter Höhe ("From Part-Forest Altitudes"); 2. Wenn du nur zuweilen Lächelst ("When You Sometimes Just Smile"); 3. Es träumte mir, ich sei dir teuer ("This I Dreamt, I Was Dear to You"); 4. Ach, wende diesen Blick ("Ah, Turn That Gaze"); 5. In meiner Nächte Sehnen ("In My Nights I Yearn"); 6. Strahlt zuweilen auch ein mildes Licht ("Sometimes Too Radiates a Mild Light"); 7. Die Schnur, die Perl an Perle ("The String, Pearl by Pearl"); 8. Unbewegte laue Luft ("Motionless Light Air")	voice, piano	1871	
Op. 58	8 Songs: 1. Blinde Kuh; 2. Während des Regens; 3. Die Spröde; 4. O komme, holde Sommernacht; 5. Schwermut; 6. In der Gasse; 7. Vorüber; 8. Serenade	voice, piano	1871	
W. 23	Regenlied, song	voice, piano	1872	published 1908
Op. 59	8 Songs: 1. Dämmerung senkte sich von oben 2. Auf dem See; 3. Regenlied ("Rain song"); 4. Nachklang ("Echo"); 5. Agnes; 6. Eine gute, gute Nacht; 7. Mein wundes Herz; 8. Dein blaues Auge	voice, piano	1873	the common theme of Nos. 3 & 4 (depicting the rain and its echo) was used as the main recurring theme of all 3 mvts of the Violin Sonata No. 1 Op. 78, known as the "Rain Sonata"
W. 22	Ophelia-Lieder ("Ophelia's Songs"): 1. Wie erkenn' ich dein Treublieb?; 2. Sein Leichenhemd weiss wie Schnee; 3. Auf morgen ist Sankt Valentins Tag; 4. Sie trugen ihn auf der Bahre bloss 5. Und kommt er nicht mehr zurück?	soprano, piano ad lib	1873	
Op. 63	9 Songs: 1. Frühlingstrost; 2. Erinnerung; 3. An ein Bild; 4. An die Tauben; 5. Junge Lieder I: Meine liebe ist grün wie der Fliederbusch; 6. Junge Lieder II: Wenn um den Holunder der Abendwind kost 7. Heimweh (1); 8. Heimweh (2); 9. Heimweh (3)	voice, piano	1874	
Op. 69	9 Songs: 1. Klage (1); 2. Klage (2); 3. Abschied; 4. Des liebsten Schwur; 5. Tambourliedchen; 6. Vom Strande; 7. Über die See; 8. Salome; 9. Mädchenfluch	voice, piano	1877	
Op. 70	4 Songs: 1. Im Garten am Seegestade; 2. Lerchengesang; 3. Serenade; 4. Abendregen	voice, piano	1875–77	
Op. 71	5 Songs: 1. Es liebt sich so lieblich im Lenze!; 2. An den Mond; 3. Geheimnis; 4. Willst du, dass ich geh?; 5. Minnelied	voice, piano	1877	
Op. 72	5 Songs: 1. Alte Liebe; 2. Sommerfäden; 3. O kühler Wald; 4. Verzagen; 5. Unüberwindlich	voice, piano	1876–77	
A. 1a/9	J. S. Bach: Sie werden euch in den Bann thun, cantata (BWV 44): Chorale Ach Gott, wie manches Herzelied (arr. by JB)	soprano and piano	1877	published 1877
Op. 85	6 Songs: 1. Sommerabend; 2. Mondenschein; 3. Mädchenlied; 4. Ade!; 5. Frühlingslied; 6. In Waldeseinsamkeit	voice, piano	1878–82	
Op. 86	6 Songs: 1. Therese; 2. Feldeinsamkeit; 3. Nachtwandler; 4. Über die Heide; 5. Versunken; 6. Todessehnen	voice, piano	1877–82	
A. 3/8	So bello non, Neapolitan canzonetta	voice, piano	1882	
Op. 91	2 Songs for an Alto Voice with Viola and Piano: 1. Gestillte Sehnsucht ("Longing at Rest"); 2. Geistliches Wiegenlied ("Sacred Lullaby")	alto, viola, piano	1863 & 84 1: 1884; 2: 1863	No. 2 revised in 1884
Op. 94	5 Songs: 1. Mit vierzig Jahren; 2. Steig auf, geliebter Schatten; 3. Mein Herz ist schwer 4. Sapphische Ode; 5. Kein Haus, keine Heimat	voice, piano	1884	
Op. 95	7 Songs: 1. Das Mädchen; 2. Bei dir sind meine Gedanken; 3. Beim Abschied; 4. Der Jäger; 5. Vorschneller Schwur; 6. Mädchenlied; 7. Schön war, das ich dir weihte	voice, piano	1884	
Op. 96	4 Songs: 1. Der Tod, das ist die kühle Nacht; 2. Wir wandelten 3. Es schauen die Blumen; 4. Meerfahrt	voice, piano	1884	
Op. 97	6 Songs: 1. Nachtigall; 2. Auf dem Schiffe; 3. Entführung; 4. Dort in den Weiden; 5. Komm bald ("Come Soon"); 6. Trennung	voice, piano	1884–85	
Op. 106	5 Songs: 1. Ständchen; 2. Auf dem See; 3. Es hing der Reif; 4. Meine Lieder; 5. Ein Wanderer	female voice, piano	1886	
Op. 105	Fünf Lieder ("5 Songs"): 1. Wie Melodien zieht es mir leise durch den Sinn ("Like Melodies It Steals Softly Through My Mind"); 2. Immer leiser wird mein Schlummer ("Ever Gentler Is My Slumber"); 3. Klage ("Lament"); 4. Auf dem Kirchhofe ("At the Graveyard"); 5. Verrat ("Betrayal")	male voice, piano	1886 & 88 1–2, 5: 1886; 3–4: 1888	
Op. 107	5 Songs: 1. An die Stolze; 2. Salamander; 3. Das Mädchen spricht 4. Maienkätzchen; 5. Mädchenlied	voice, piano	1886–88	
A. 3/7	Doch was hör ich?, aphorismus	voice	1891	
Op. 121	Vier ernste Gesänge (4 Serious Songs): 1. Denn es gehet dem Menschen wie dem Vieh ("Because It Is for Man Like the Cattle"); 2. Ich wandte mich und sahe an alle ("I Turned and Looked at All"); 3. O Tod, wie bitter bist du ("Oh Death, How Bitter You Are"); 4. Wenn ich mit Menschen- und mit Engelszungen redete ("If I speak in the tongues of men or of angels")	bass, piano	1896	also arr. for high voice and piano
==== Folksongs ====
W. 31	15 Volkskinderlieder ("15 Children's Folk Songs"): 1. Dornröschen; 2. Die Nachtigall; 3. Die Henne; 4. Sandmännchen (Die Blümelein sie schlafen) ("Sandman" ("The Flowers Are Sleeping")) (Lullaby); 5. Der Mann; 6. Heidenröslein; 7. Das Schlaraffenland; 8. Beim Ritt auf dem Knie (2 versions); 9. Der Jäger im Walde; 10. Das Mädchen und die Hasel; 11. Wiegenlied; 12. Weihnachten; 13. Marienwürmchen; 14. Dem Schutzengel; 15. Sommerlied	voice, piano	1857	published 1858
W. 32	28 Deutsche Volkslieder ("28 German Folk Songs"): 1. Die Schnürbrust; 2. Der Jäger; 3. Drei Vögelein; 4. Auf, gebet uns das Pfingstei; 5. Des Markgrafen Töchterlein; 6. Der Reiter; 7. Die heilige Elisabeth; 8. Der englische Gruß; 9. Ich stund an einem Morgen; 10. Gunhilde; 11. Der tote Gast; 12. Tageweis von einer schönen Frauen; 13. Schifferlied; 14. Nachtgesang; 15. Die beiden Königskinder; 16. Scheiden; 17. Altes Minnelied; 18. Der getreue Eckard (2 versions); 19. Die Versuchung; 20. Der Tochter Wunsch; 21. Schnitter Tod; 22. Marias Wallfahrt; 23. Das Mädchen und der Tod; 24. Es ritt ein Ritter; 25. Liebeslied; 26. Guten Abend; 27. Die Wollust in den Maien; 28. Es reit ein Herr und auch sein Knecht	voice, piano	1858	published 1926
=== Duets ===
Op. 20	3 Duets: 1. Weg der Liebe ("Way of Love") (1); 2. Weg der Liebe ("Way of Love") (2); 3. Die Meere ("The Seas")	soprano, alto, piano	1858–60	
Op. 28	4 Duets: 1. Die Nonne und der Ritter ("The Nun and the Knight"); 2. Vor der Tür ("Behind the Door"); 3. Es rauschet das Wasser ("The Water Rustles"); 4. Der Jäger und sein Liebchen ("The Hunter and his Beloved")	alto, baritone, piano	1860–62	
A. 1a/10	Georg Friedrich Händel: 7 Duets and 2 Trios (arr. by JB)	2 sopranos, alto, bass, piano	1870	published 1870
Op. 61	4 Duets: 1. Die Schwestern; 2. Klosterfräulein; 3. Phänomen; 4. Die Boten der Liebe	soprano, alto, piano	1852–74	
Op. 66	5 Duets: 1. Klänge (1); 2. Klänge (2); 3. Am Strande; 4. Jägerlied; 5. Hüt du dich!	soprano, alto, piano	1873–75	
Op. 75	4 Ballades and Romances: 1. Edward (alto and tenor); 2. Guter Rat (soprano and alto); 3. So lass uns wandern! (soprano and tenor); 4. Walpurgisnacht (2 sopranos)	2 voices, piano	1877–78	
A. 1a/11	Georg Friedrich Händel: 6 Duets (arr. by JB)	2 sopranos, alto, piano	1880	published 1880
Op. 84	5 Romances and Songs: 1. Sommerabend; 2. Der Kranz; 3. In den Beeren; 4. Vergebliches Ständchen; 5. Spannung	1 or 2 voices, piano	1881–82	
=== Quartets ===
Op. 31	3 Quartets: 1. Wechsellied zum Tanze ("Substitution Song at the Dance"); 2. Neckereien ("Banter"); 3. Der Gang zum Liebchen ("The Visit to my Beloved")	mixed voices, piano	1859 & 63 1: 1859; 2: 1863; 3: 1863	
Op. 52	Liebeslieder-Walzer ("Love Song Waltzes"): 1. Rede, Mädchen, allzu liebes 2. Am Gesteine rauscht die Flut; 3. O die Frauen (tenor & bass); 4. Wie des Abends schöne Röte (soprano & alto); 5. Die grüne Hopfenranke; 6. Ein kleiner, hübscher Vogel nahm den Flug; 7. Wohl schön bewandt (alto); 8. Wenn so lind dein Augen mir 9. Am Donaustrande, da steht ein Haus; 10. O wie sanft die Quelle; 11. Nein, est ist nicht auszukommen 12. Schlosser auf, und mache Schlösser; 13. Vöglein durchrauscht die Luft (soprano & alto); 14. Sieh, wie ist die Welle klar (tenor & bass); 15. Nachtigall, sie singt so schön 16. Ein dunkeler Schacht ist Liebe; 17. Nicht wandle, mein Licht dort außen (tenor); 18. Es bebet das Gesträuche	vocal quartet, piano 4-hands	1869	eight of them along with a new one later included in Op. 65 arr. for vocal quartet and small orchestra in 1869–70 (Nos. 1, 2, 4, 6, 5, 9 (Op. 65), 11, 8, 9) (the rest arr. later by Richard Sargeant) published 1938; arr. for piano 4-hands (without voices) in 1874 as Op. 52a; arr. for voices and piano solo in 1875
Op. 64	3 Quartets: 1. An die Heimat; 2. Der Abend; 3. Fragen	mixed voices	1874	
Op. 65	Neue Liebeslieder ("New Love Songs"): 1. Verzicht, o Herz, auf Rettung; 2. Finstere Schatten der Nacht; 3. An jeder Hand die Finger (soprano); 4. Ihr schwarzen Augen (bass); 5. Wahre, wahre deinen Sohn (alto); 6. Rosen steckt mit an die Mutter (soprano); 7. Vom Gebirge, Well' auf Well'; 8. Weiche Gräser im Revier; 9. Nagen am Herzen (soprano); 10. Ich kose süß mit der und der (tenor); 11. Alles, alles in den Wind (soprano); 12. Schwarzer Wald, dein Schatten ist so düster 13. Nein, Geliebter, setze dich (soprano and alto); 14. Flammenauge, dunkles Haar; 15. Zum Schluß: Nun ihr Musen, genug!	vocal quartet, piano 4-hands	1869–74	No. 9 arr. for soprano and small orchestra in 1869–70 (included with orchestrations of Op. 52) (the rest arr. later by Richard Sargeant); arr. for piano 4-hands (without voices) in 1875 as Op. 65a; No. 4 arr. for solo voice and piano solo (lost)
Op. 92	4 Quartets: 1. O schöne Nacht!; 2. Spätherbst; 3. Abendlied; 4. Warum?	mixed voices	1884	
Op. 103	Zigeunerlieder ("Gypsy Songs"), song cycle: 1. He, Zigeuner, greife in die Saiten ein!; 2. Hochgetürmte Rimaflut, wie bist du trüb 3. Wißt ihr, wann mein Kindchen am allerschönsten ist?; 4. Lieber Gott, du weißt, wie oft bereut ich hab 5. Brauner Bursche führt zum Tanze; 6. Röslein dreie in der Reihe blühn so rot 7. Kommt dir manchmal in den Sinn; 8. Horch, der Wind klagt in den Zweigen traurig sacht 9. Weit und breit schaut niemand mich an 10. Mond verhüllt sein Angesicht; 11. Rote Abendwolken ziehn am Firmament	vocal quartet, piano	1887–88	Nos. 1–7 and 11 arr. for solo voice and piano 1888
Op. 112	6 Quartets: 1. Sehnsucht; 2. Nächtens; 3–6. Vier Zigeunerlieder: 1. Himmel strahlt so helle 2. Rote Rosenknospen künden 3. Brennessel steht an Weges Rand; 4. Liebe Schwalbe, kleine Schwalbe	mixed voices, piano	1888 & 91 1–2: 1888; 3–6: 1891	
=== Choral works ===
==== Liturgical works ====
W. 17	Kyrie	4-part mixed chorus, basso continuo	1856	
W. 18	Missa canonica: 1. Kyrie; 2. Sanctus; 3. Benedictus; 4. Agnus Dei	6-part mixed chorus, organ or basso continuo	1856–61	incomplete: missing Gloria and Credo; published 1984
A. 1a/19	Franz Schubert: Große Messe (Mass No. 6), D. 950 (orchestral part transcribed by JB)	SATB chorus, piano	1865	
Op. 45	Ein deutsches Requiem ("A German Requiem")	soprano, baritone, mixed chorus, orchestra, organ ad lib	1865–68	original version with 6 mvts and baritone solos in 3rd & 5th mvts (no soprano solos) written 1865–66, new version with additional mvt with soprano solo in between mvts 4 & 5 (now mvt 5) written 1868; 2nd mvt taken from an abandoned piece written in 1854; original version arr. for piano solo 1866; new version arr. for piano 4-hands 1868; new version arr. for soprano, baritone, mixed chorus, piano 4-hands 1871 (known as the "London Version")
==== Motets ====
Op. 30	Geistliches Lied ("Spiritual Song")	mixed chorus, organ	1856	
Op. 12	Ave Maria	female chorus, wind/string orchestra	1858–59	reduction of orchestra part for organ 1859
Op. 27	Psalm 13	female chorus, organ/piano	1859	1st version 1859, 2nd version for female chorus, organ/piano, strings ad lib published 1927
Op. 29	2 Motets: 1. Es ist das Heil uns kommen her ("It Is the Salvation that Has Come to Us"); 2. Schaffe in mir, Gott, ein rein Herz ("Create in Me, God, a Pure Heart")	mixed chorus	1860	
Op. 37	3 Sacred Choruses: 1. O bone Jesu ("O Good Jesus"); 2. Adoramus ("We Adore"); 3. Regina Coeli ("Queen of Heaven")	female chorus	1859–63	
Op. 74	2 Motets: 1. Warum ist das Licht gegeben dem Mühseligen? ("Why has light been given to the weary of soul?"); 2. O Heiland, reiß die Himmel auf ("O Saviour, tear open the heavens")	mixed chorus	1863 & 77 1: 1877; 2: 1863	
Op. 109	Fest- und Gedenksprüche ("Festive and Commemorative Sayings"), motet cycle: 1. Unsere Väter hofften auf dich ("Our Fathers Trusted In You"); 2. Wenn ein starker Gewappneter ("If a Heavily Armed Man"); 3. Wo ist ein so herrlich Volk ("Where Is There Such a Great People")	mixed double chorus	1889	
Op. 110	3 Motets: 1. Ich aber bin elend, und mir ist wehe 2. Ach, arme Welt, du trügst mich 3. Wenn wir in höchsten Nöten sein	mixed double chorus	1889	
==== Cantatas ====
Op. 50	Rinaldo, cantata	tenor, 4-part male chorus, orchestra	1863 & 68	
W. 16	Kleine Hochzeits-Kantate	4-part mixed chorus, piano	1874	published 1927
==== Canons ====
A. 4/3	Is denn mei Vater ein Leiersmann, canon	3 voices		authorship doubtful
W. 28	Töne, lindernder Klang, canon	4-part female chorus	1861	arr. for mixed chorus 1871; mixed chorus arr. published 1872
W. 24	Grausam erweiset sich Amor, canon	4-part female chorus	1863	published 1927
W. 26	O wie sanft!, canon	4-part female chorus	1870	published 1908
W. 30	Zu Rauch muss werden, canon in E♭ major	4-part mixed chorus	1870	2nd version in D major 1870; 1st version published 1927
W. 25	Mir lächelt kein Frühling, canon	4-part female chorus	1877	published 1881
W. 29	Wann?, canon	soprano, alto	1881	published 1885
Op. 113	13 Canons: 1. Göttlicher Morpheus; 2. Grausam erweiset sich Amor am mir 3. Sitzt a schöns Vögerl aufm Dannabaum; 4. Schlaf, Kindlein, schlaf!; 5. Wille, wille, will 6. So lange Schönheit wird bestehn 7. Wenn die Klänge nahn und fliehen 8. Ein Gems auf dem Stein; 9. Ans Auge des Liebsten; 10. Leise Töne der Brust; 11. Ich weiss nicht was im Hain die Taube girret 12. Wenn Kummer hätte zu töten Macht; 13. Einförmig ist der Liebe Gram	female chorus	1891	
==== Folksongs ====
W. 36	8 Deutsche Volkslieder ("8 German Folk Songs"): 1. Totenklage; 2. Minnelied; 3. Der tote Knabe; 4. Ich hab die Nacht geträumet 5. Altdeutches Minnelied; 6. Es waren zwei Königskinder; 7. Spannung; 8. Drei Vögelein	female chorus, piano ad lib	1859–62	
W. 37	16 Deutsche Volkslieder ("16 German folk songs"): 1. Schwesterlein, wann gehn wir 2. Ich hörte ein Sichlein rauschen 3. Der Ritter und die Feine; 4. Ich stand auf hohem Berge; 5. Gunhilde; 6. Der buckligte Fiedler; 7. Die Versuchung; 8. Altes Minnelied; 9. Die Wollust in den Maien; 10. Trennung; 11. Der Jäger; 12. Scheiden; 13. Zu Strassburg auf der Schanz; 14. Wach auf, mein Hort; 15. Der Ritter; 16. Ständchen	female chorus, piano ad lib	1859–62	
W. 38	20 Deutsche Volkslieder ("20 German folk songs"): 1. Die Entführung; 2. Gang zur Liebsten; 3. Schifferlied; 4. Erlaube mir, feins Mädchen; 5. Schnitter Tod; 6. Die Bernauerin; 7. Das Lied vom eifersüchtigen Knaben; 8. Der Baum im Odenwald; 9. Des Markgrafen Töchterlein; 10. Die stolze Jüdin; 11. Der Zimmergesell; 12. Liebesllied; 13. Heimliche Liebe; 14. Altes Liebeslied; 15. Dauernde Liebe; 16. Während der Trennung; 17. Morgen muss ich fort von hier 18. Scheiden; 19. Vor dem Fenster; 20. Ständchen	female chorus, piano ad lib	1859–62	
W. 34	14 Deutsche Volkslieder ("14 German Folk Songs"): 1. Von edler Art; 2. Mit Lust tät ich ausreiten 3. Bei nächtlicher Weil; 4. Vom heiligen Märtyrer Emmerano; 5. Täublein weiss 6. Ach lieber Herre Jesu Christ; 7. Sankt Raphael; 8. In Stiller Nacht, zur ersten Wacht; 9. Abschiedslied; 10. Der tote Knabe; 11. Die Wollust in den Maien; 12. Morgengesang; 13. Schnitter Tod; 14. Der englische Jäger	4-part mixed chorus	1857 & 64 1–3, 8–11: 13–14: 1857; 4–7, 12: 1864	published 1864
W. 35	12 Deutsche Volkslieder ("12 German Folk Songs"): 1. Scheiden; 2. Wach auf!; 3. Erlaube mir 4. Der Fiedler; 5. Da unten im Tale (female chorus); 6. Des Abends; 7. Wach auf!; 8. Dort in den Weiden; 9. Altes Volkslied; 10. Der Ritter un die Feine; 11. Der Zimmergesell; 12. Altdeustches Kampflied	4-part mixed chorus, piano ad lib	1857–64 1–7: 1857–58; 8–12: 1863–64	published 1927
W. 33	49 Deutsche Volkslieder ("49 German Folk Songs"): 1. Sagt mir, o schönste Schäfrin mein 2. Erlaube mir, feins Mädchen; 3. Gar lieblich hat sich gesellet 4. Guten Abend, mein tausiger Schatz; 5. Die Sonne scheint nicht mehr 6. Da unten im Tale; 7. Gunhilde; 8. Ach, englische Schäferin; 9. Es war eine schöne Jüdin; 10. Es ritt ein Ritter; 11. Jungfräulein, soll ich mit euch gehn 12. Feinsliebchen, du sollst mir nicht barfuss gehn 13. Wach auf, mein Hort; 14. Maria ging aus wandern 15. Schwesterlein, Schwesterlein, wann gehn wir 16. Wach auf, Mein Herzensschöne; 17. Ach Gott, wie weh tut scheiden 18. So wünsch' ich ihr ein gute Nacht; 19. Nur ein Gesicht auf Erden lebt 20. Schönster Schatz, mein Engel; 21. Es ging ein Maidlein zarte 22. Wo gehst du hin, du Stolze?; 23. Der Reiter; 24. Mir ist ein schöns brauns Maidelein; 25. Mein Mädel hat einen Rosenmund; 26. Ach, könnt ich diesen Abend; 27. Ich stand auf hohem Berge; 28. Es reit ein Herr und auch sein Knecht; 29. Es war ein Markgraf überm Rhein; 30. All mein Gedanken; 31. Dort in den Weiden steht ein Haus; 32. Wo will ich frisch und fröhlich sein 33. Och Moder, ich well en Ding han!; 34. Wie komm ich denn zur Tür herein?; 35. Soll sich der Mond nicht heller scheinen 36. Es wohnet ein Fiedler zu Frankfurt am Main; 37. Du mein einzig Licht; 38. Des Abends kann ich nicht schlafen gehn 39. Schöner Augen, schöne Strahlen; 40. Ich weiss mir'n Maidlein hübsch und fein 41. Es steht ein Lind; 42. In stiller Nacht, zur ersten Wacht; 43. Es stunden drei Rosen; 44. Dem Himmel will ich klagen 45. Es sass ein schneeweiss Vögelein; 46. Es war einmal ein Zimmergesell; 47. Es ging sich unsre Fraue; 48. Nachtigall, sag, was für Grüss; 49. Verstohlen geht der Mond auf	1-42. voice, piano 43-49. voice, small chorus ad lib, piano	1893–94	published 1894
==== Other choral works ====
A. 3/12	Brautgesang ("Bridal Song")	soprano, 4-part female chorus, orchestra		fragment
Op. 13	Begräbnisgesang ("Funeral Song")	mixed chorus, winds	1858–59	arr. for mixed chorus and piano 1858–59
Op. 17	Vier Gesänge ("4 Songs"): 1. Es tönt ein voller Harfenklang ("The Full Sound of a Harp Resounds"); 2. Lied von Shakespeare ("Song by Shakespeare"); 3. Der Gärtner ("The Gardener"); 4. Gesang aus Fingal ("Song from Fingal")	female chorus, 2 horns, harp	1860	
Op. 22	Marienlieder ("Songs for Mary"): 1. Der Englische Gruß ("The Angel's Annunciation"); 2. Marias Kirchgang ("Mary's Churchgoing"); 3. Marias Wallfahrt ("Mary's Pilgrimage"); 4. Der Jäger ("The Hunter"); 5. Ruf zur Maria ("Call to Mary"); 6. Magdalena ("Magdalene"); 7. Marias Lob ("Mary's Praise")	mixed chorus	1859–60	Nos. 1, 2, 4–7 arr. for female chorus 1859–62 published 1940
Op. 44	12 Songs and Romances Book 1: 1. Minnelied ("Song of Love"); 2. Der Bräutigam ("The Bridegroom"); 3. Barcarole ("Barcarole"); 4. Fragen ("Asking"); 5. Die Müllerin ("The Miller"); 6. Die Nonne ("The Nun"); Book 2: 7–10. Vier Lieder aus dem Jungbrunnen ("Four Songs from the Fountain of Youth"): 7. Nun stehn die Rosen in Blüte; 8. Die Berge sind spitz 9. Am Wildbach die Weiden; 10. Und gehst du über den Kirchof; 11. Die Braut ("The Bride"); 12. Märznacht ("March Night")	4-part female chorus, piano ad lib	1859–60	Nos. 1 & 9 arr. 3-part female chorus 1862 published 1968 (No. 1) & 1952 (No. 9); Nos. 5 & 6 arr. 4-part mixed chorus 1862 unpublished
W. 19	Dein Herzlein mild	4-part female chorus	1860	
Op. 42	Drei Gesänge ("3 Songs"): 1. Abendständchen ("Evening Serenade"); 2. Vineta ("Vineta"); 3. Darthulas Grabgesang ("Darthula's Grave-Song")	6-part mixed chorus	1859–61 1: 1859; 2: 1860; 3: 1861	reduction for piano of vocal score 1859–61 (for rehearsal only); No. 2 arr. for 4-part female chorus 1862 published 1938
Op. 41	5 Songs: 1. Ich schwing mein Horn ins Jammerthal ("I Blow My Horn in the Valley of Sorrow"); 2. Freiwillige Her! ("Volunteer Here!"); 3. Geleit ("Escort"); 4. Marschieren ("Marching"); 5. Gebt Acht! ("Watch Out!")	male voices	1861–62	Nos. 1 & 2 arr. for female chorus published 1968 (No. 1) & 1938 (No. 2)
Op. 53	Rhapsody ("Alto Rhapsody")	contralto, male chorus, orchestra	1869	
Op. 54	Schicksalslied ("Song of Destiny")	4-part mixed chorus, orchestra	1868–71	
Op. 55	Triumphlied ("Song of Triumph")	baritone, double mixed chorus, organ ad lib, orchestra	1870–71	arr. for piano 4-hands 1873
A. 1a/14	Franz Schubert: Gruppe aus dem Tartarus, song (Op. 24 No. 1, D. 583) (arr. by JB)	male chorus, orchestra	1871	
A. 1a/17	Franz Schubert: Ellens Gesang II, song (Op. 52 No. 2, D. 838) (arr. by JB)	soprano, 3-part female chorus, 4 horns, 2 bassoons	1873	2nd version; published 1906
Op. 62	Sieben Lieder ("7 Songs"): 1. Rosmarin; 2. Von alten Liebesliedern; 3. Waldesnacht; 4. Dein Herzlein mild 5. All meine Herzgedanken; 6. Es geht ein Wehen; 7. Vergangen ist mir Glück und Heil	mixed chorus	1873–74	No. 6 arr. for 4-part female chorus published 1938; No. 7 arr. for soprano, mixed chorus
W. 20	Dem dunklen Schoss der heilgen Erde	mixed chorus	1880	published 1927
Op. 82	Nänie	mixed chorus, orchestra	1880–81	
Op. 89	Gesang der Parzen ("Song of the Fates")	6-part mixed chorus, orchestra	1882	
Op. 93a	6 Songs and Romances: 1. Der bucklichte Fiedler; 2. Das Mädchen; 3. O süßer Mai; 4. Fahr wohl!; 5. Der Falke; 6. Beherzigung	mixed chorus	1883	
Op. 93b	Tafellied (Dank der Damen)	mixed chorus, piano	1884	
Op. 104	Fünf Gesänge ("5 Songs"): 1. Nachtwache ("Night Watch") (1); 2. Nachtwache ("Night Watch") (2); 3. Letztes Glück ("Last Happiness"); 4. Verlorne Jugend ("Lost Youth") (5-part ch); 5. Im Herbst ("In Autumn") (4-part ch)	6-part mixed chorus	1886–88 1–4: 1888; 5: 1886–87	No. 5 revised in 1888
== Miscellaneous ==
A. 1b/1-36	Various performance materials to works by other composers			see for list
A. 2a/1-29	Various lost works			see for list
A. 2b/1-7	Various lost arrangements by Brahms of other composers' works			see for list
A. 3/14-19	Various sketches and sketchbooks			see for list
A. 5a/1-3	Various collections of folk songs, notated by Brahms			see for list
A. 5a/4-21	Various transcripts of other composers' works, notated by Brahms			see for list
A. 5b/1-3	Various autograph text collections			see for list
A. 6/1-19	Various works by other composers, edited by Brahms			see for list
