= Piano Sonata No. 3 =

Piano Sonata No. 3 may refer to:

- Piano Sonata No. 3 (Beethoven)
- Piano Sonata No. 3 (Boulez)
- Piano Sonata No. 3 (Brahms)
- Piano Sonata No. 3 (Chávez)
- Piano Sonata No. 3 (Chopin)
- Piano Sonata No. 3 (Enescu)
- Piano Sonata No. 3 (Hindemith)
- Piano Sonata No. 3 (Krenek), Op. 92, No. 4
- Piano Sonata No. 3 (Mozart)
- Piano Sonata No. 3 (Persichetti), Op. 22
- Piano Sonata No. 3 (Prokofiev)
- Piano Sonata No. 3 (Schubert)
- Piano Sonata No. 3 (Schumann)
- Piano Sonata No. 3 (Scriabin)

== See also ==
- Cello Sonata No. 3 (disambiguation)
- Violin Sonata No. 3 (disambiguation)
