= Zu Bethlehem geboren =

German Christmas carol

- German Christmas carol
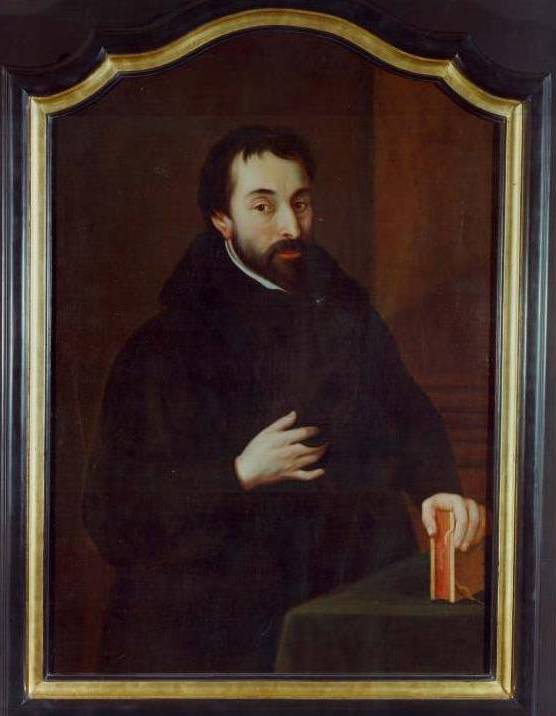
- The lyricist
- English: Born in Bethlehem
- Written: 1637
- Text: by Friedrich Spee
- Language: German
- Melody: French chanson
- Composed: c. 1600
- Published: 1638

"Zu Bethlehem geboren" is a German Christmas carol. The text is attributed to Friedrich Spee and was first printed in the collection Geistlichen Psälterlein (Little sacred psalter) by Johannes Heringsdorf in Cologne in 1637. The author was unknown until the 20th century, but research of style and content arrived at the attribution. The song was printed with a then-popular secular melody in 1638. The song appears in current Catholic and Protestant hymnals.

== Melody and settings ==
The melody was taken from a French chanson that was popular at the time, Une petite feste, with a frivolous text. It is found in a Paris song collection by Pierre Cerveau, Airs mis en musique à quatre parties (1599), and also in Pierre Bonnet's Airs et vilanelles mises en musique à 4 et 5 parties (1600). Spee often wrote sacred texts for secular melodies, intending to fight their "pestilent poison" (pestilenzisch Gift).

The song was printed with the melody in 1638, titled Hertzopffer (The heart's sacrifice) in the Cologne collection Geistlicher Psalter. Probably even sooner, the melody appeared with a text for Kindelwiegen, "Nun wiegen wir das Kindlein" (Now we rock the little child) in a manuscript tablature, which was written by Henricus Beginiker from 1623.

In the 19th century, the hymn became a sacred folksong. Anton Wilhelm von Zuccalmaglio used the same melody, slightly modified, for a lullaby "Die Blümelein, sie schlafen" (The little flowers, they sleep) in 1840. This version was adopted by Johannes Brahms as "Sandmännchen", No. 4 of his 15 Volkskinderlieder, WoO 31 (McCorkle), with a piano accompaniment, first printed in Winterthur by J. Rieter-Biedermann in 1858.

The song is part of current German hymnals, in the Protestant hymnal Evangelisches Gesangbuch as EG 32, and in the Catholic Gotteslob as GL 239.

== Text and melody ==
Zu Bethlehem geboren
ist uns ein Kindelein.
Das hab ich auserkoren,
sein eigen will ich sein.
Eia, eia, sein eigen will ich sein.

In seine Lieb versenken
will ich mich ganz hinab;
mein Herz will ich ihm schenken
und alles, was ich hab.
Eia, eia, und alles, was ich hab.

O Kindelein, von Herzen
dich will ich lieben sehr
in Freuden und in Schmerzen,
je länger mehr und mehr.
Eia, eia, je länger mehr und mehr.

Dich wahren Gott ich finde
in meinem Fleisch und Blut;
darum ich fest mich binde
an dich, mein höchstes Gut.
Eia, eia, an dich, mein höchstes Gut.

Dazu dein Gnad mir gebe,
bitt ich aus Herzensgrund,
dass dir allein ich lebe
jetzt und zu aller Stund.
Eia, eia, jetzt und zu aller Stund.

Lass mich von dir nicht scheiden,
knüpf zu, knüpf zu das Band
der Liebe zwischen beiden,
nimm hin mein Herz zum Pfand.
Eia, eia, nimm hin mein Herz zum Pfand.

== See also ==
- List of Christmas carols
