= Piano Trio No. 4 =

Piano Trio No. 4 may refer to:

- Piano Trio No. 4 (Beethoven)
- Piano Trio in A major (attributed to Johannes Brahms)
- Piano Trio No. 4 (Dvořák)
- Piano Trio No. 4 (Mozart)
