= Schicksalslied =

Composition for chorus and orchestra by Johannes Brahms

- Choral composition by Johannes Brahms
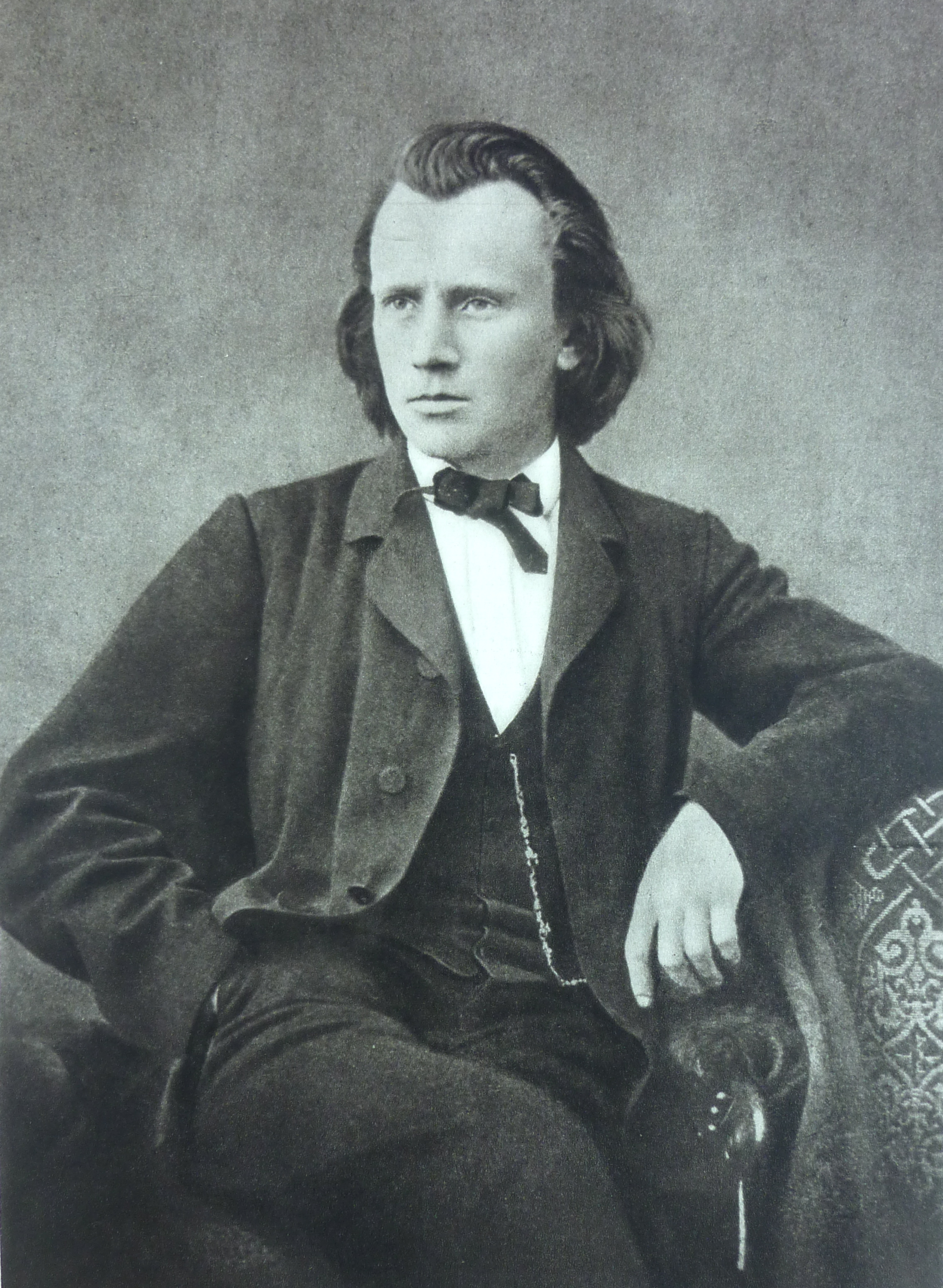
- The composer c. 1866
- English: Song of Destiny
- Opus: 54
- Text: by Friedrich Hölderlin
- Language: German
- Composed: 1868–1871
- Performed: 18 October 1871
- Duration: 15 minutes
- Movements: 3
- Scoring: mixed choir; orchestra

The Schicksalslied (Song of Destiny), Op. 54, is an orchestrally accompanied choral setting of a poem written by Friedrich Hölderlin and is one of several major choral works written by Johannes Brahms.

== History ==
Brahms began the work in the summer of 1868 at Wilhelmshaven, but it was not completed until May 1871. The delay was primarily due to Brahms's hesitation over how the piece should end. Hesitant to make a decision, he began work on the Alto Rhapsody, Op. 53, which was completed in 1869 and first performed in 1870.

Schicksalslied is considered to be one of Brahms's best choral works along with Ein deutsches Requiem. In fact, Josef Sittard argues in his book on Brahms, "Had Brahms never written anything but this one work, it would alone have sufficed to rank him with the best masters." The premiere performance of Schicksalslied was given on 18 October 1871 in Karlsruhe, under the direction of Hermann Levi. One of the shortest of Brahms's major choral works, a typical performance lasts around 15 to 16 minutes.

The autograph manuscript of the work is preserved in the Library of Congress.

== Instrumentation ==
The piece is scored for two flutes, two oboes, two clarinets, two bassoons, two horns, two trumpets, three trombones, timpani, strings, and a four-part chorus.

== Form ==
Schicksalslied
Performed by the M.I.T. Concert Choir, conducted by William Cutter

The work is in three movements, marked as follows:

1. Adagio: Ihr wandelt droben im Licht. (E♭ major)
2. Allegro: Doch uns ist gegeben. (C minor)
3. Adagio: Orchestral postlude (C major)

== Text ==
Ihr wandelt droben im Licht
Auf weichem Boden selige Genien!
Glänzende Götterlüfte
Rühren Euch leicht,
Wie die Finger der Künstlerin
Heilige Saiten.

Schicksallos, wie der Schlafende
Säugling, atmen die Himmlischen;
Keusch bewahrt,
In bescheidener Knospe
Blühet ewig
Ihnen der Geist,
Und die seligen Augen
Blicken in stiller
Ewiger Klarheit.

Doch uns ist gegeben
Auf keiner Stätte zu ruh'n;
Es schwinden, es fallen
Die leidenden Menschen
Blindlings von einer
Stunde zur andern,
Wie Wasser von Klippe
Zu Klippe geworfen
Jahrlang ins Ungewisse hinab.

Ye wander gladly in light
Through goodly mansions, dwellers in Spiritland!
Luminous heaven-breezes
Touching you softly,
Like as fingers when skillfully
Wakening harp-strings.

Fearlessly, like the slumbering
Infant, abide the Beatified;
Pure retained,
Like unopened blossoms,
Flowering ever,
Joyful their soul
And their heavenly vision
Gifted with placid
Never-ceasing clearness.

To us is allotted
No restful haven to find;
They falter, they perish,
Poor suffering mortals
Blindly as moment
Follows to moment,
Like water from mountain
to mountain impelled,
Destined to disappearance below.

== History ==
Brahms began work on the Schicksalslied in the summer of 1868 while visiting his good friend Albert Dietrich in Wilhelmshaven. It was in Dietrich's personal library that Brahms discovered "Hyperions Schicksalslied", from Hölderlin's novel Hyperion, in a book of Hölderlin's poetry. Dietrich recalls in his writing that Brahms first received the inspiration for the piece while watching the sea:

In the summer Brahms again came [to Wilhelmshaven], to make a few excursions in the neighbourhood with us and the Reinthalers. One morning we went together to Wilhelmshaven, for Brahms was interested in seeing the magnificent naval port. On the way there, our friend, who was usually so lively, was quiet and grave. He described how early that morning (he was always an early riser), he had found Hölderlin's poems in the bookcase and had been deeply impressed by the Schicksalslied. Later on, after spending a long time walking round and visiting all the points of interest, we were sitting resting by the sea, when we discovered Brahms a long way off sitting by himself on the shore writing. It was the first sketch for the Schicksalslied, which appeared fairly soon afterwards. A lovely excursion which we had arranged to the Urwald was never carried out. He hurried back to Hamburg, in order to give himself up to his work.

Brahms completed an initial setting of Hölderlin's two verses in ternary form with the third movement being a complete restatement of the first. However, Brahms was dissatisfied with this full restatement of the first movement to close the piece, as he felt that it would nullify the grim reality depicted in the second movement. This conflict remained unresolved, and Schicksalslied unpublished, while Brahms turned his attention to the "Alto Rhapsody" from 1869–70. The piece was not realized in its final form until a solution was suggested to Brahms in 1871 by Hermann Levi (who conducted the premiere of Schicksalslied later that year). Levi proposed that in lieu of a full return of the first movement, a reintroduction of only the orchestral prelude should be used to conclude the piece. Convinced by Levi, Brahms composed the third movement as a copy of the orchestral prelude in the first movement with a richer instrumentation and transposed into C major. While Brahms was hesitant to break the desperation and ultimate futility of the second movement by bringing a blissful return to the first, some see Brahms's return to the orchestral prelude as "a desire on the part of the composer to relieve the gloom of the concluding idea of the text by shedding a ray of light over the whole, and leaving a more hopeful impression".

== Musical elements ==
Schicksalslied, which John Lawrence Erb posits is "perhaps the most widely loved of all of Brahms's compositions and the most perfect of his smaller choral works", is sometimes referred to as the "Little Requiem", as it shares many stylistic and compositional similarities with Brahms's most ambitious choral composition. The Romantic characteristics of Schicksalslied, however, give this piece a closer tie with the "Alto Rhapsody" than the Requiem. Whichever piece it most closely relates to, it is clear that Schicksalsied was the work of a master composer working at the height of his skill. John Alexander Fuller Maitland stated that in Schicksalslied, Brahms "set the pattern of the short choral-ballad, to which, in Nänie, Op. 82, and the Gesang der Parzen, Op. 89, Brahms subsequently returned". Likewise, Hadow praises the piece for "its technical beauties, its rounded symmetry of balance and charm of melody, and its marvelous cadences where chord melts into chord like colour into colour".

The first movement, marked Adagio, is in common time and begins in E♭ major. The piece opens with 28 measures of an orchestral prelude (which Brahms later re-orchestrates in the third movement). At measure 29, the altos enter with the initial statement of the choral melody, which is immediately reiterated by the sopranos while the rest of the chorus adds harmony.

Alto theme

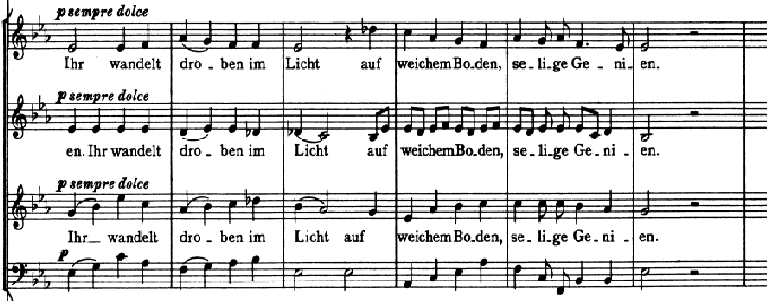
Choral theme

The first example of the text painting in Schicksalslied occurs in measure 41, with the "luminous" harmonies as the choir sings "Glänzende Götterlüfte".

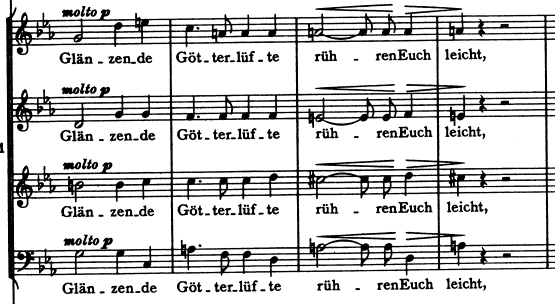
Choral text painting

The orchestra returns to prominence at measure 52 with harplike accompaniment as the chorus presents a new melody to the line Wie die Finger der Künstlerin Heilige Saiten. At measure 64, the orchestra cadences in the dominant key (B♭ major) before repeating the first thematic melody line originally stated by the alto voices.

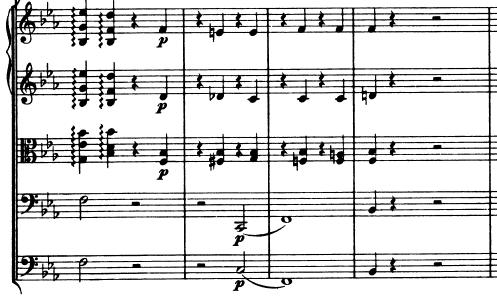
Orchestral cadence in B♭ major

This time, however, the melody is taken initially by the horn with the entire chorus repeating the theme on Schicksallos, wie der Schlafende Säugling.

Theme in horns

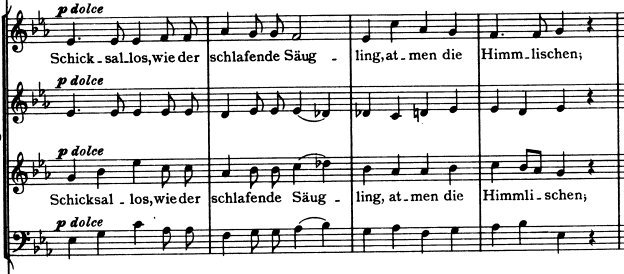
Choral theme 2

While Brahms does return to the initial thematic material in the dominant tonality, the restatement is a mere 12 bars while the initial statement was 23. This section ends with a similar orchestral cadence in measure 81, this time in tonic.

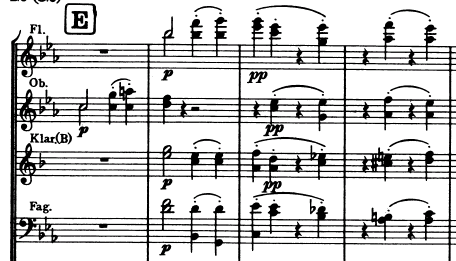
Orchestral cadence in tonic

The melodic theme returns one final time in this first movement at the choral line Und die seligen Augen (measure 84), which cadences in E♭ major (measure 96). The orchestra plays two D diminished triads to conclude the first movement and prepare C minor as the next tonality.

The second movement, in C minor and 3/4 meter, is marked Allegro and opens with eight measures of eighth note motion in the strings. The orchestral eighth notes continue for 20 measures as the chorus enters in unison with Doch uns ist gegeben. The eighth notes intensify and climax at a ff in measure 132 as Brahms sets the lyric blindlings von einer Stunde zur andern to the chorus dividing into a B diminished seventh chord.

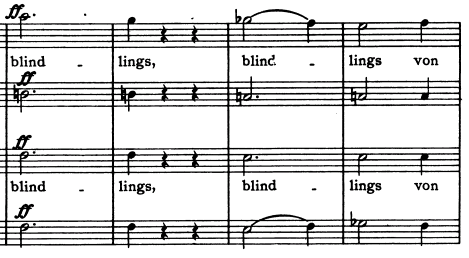
Text painting 2

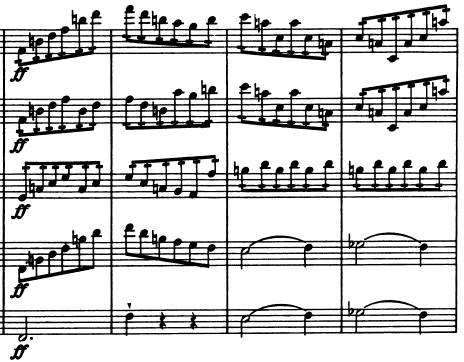
Orchestral quaver

In an effort to elicit an effect of gasping for breath, Brahms inserts a hemiola over the lyric Wasser von Klippe zu Klippe geworfen. By alternating quarter notes with quarter rests, this section feels as though the meter has changed, essentially converting two bars of 3/4 into one of 3/2.

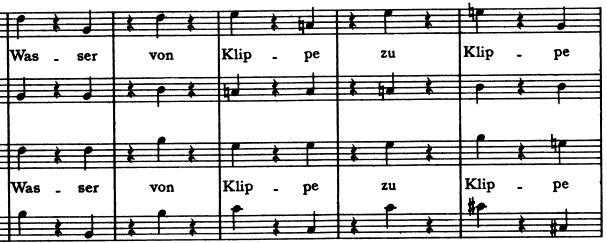
Choral hemiola

Hemiola 1

Hemiola 2

The ordinary rhythm returns in measure 154 with the choir completing the stanza and ultimately cadencing on a D major triad in measure 172.

After a 21-measure orchestral interlude, Brahms restates the last stanza of text with two separate fugal sections in measures 194–222 and 222–273. Following the fugal sections, Brahms repeats the entire second movement (excluding the fugues) in D minor. The chorus replaces their final D major triad of the first statement with a D♯ diminished chord in measure 322.

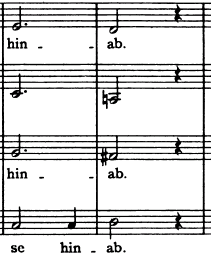
Choral cadence, measure 172

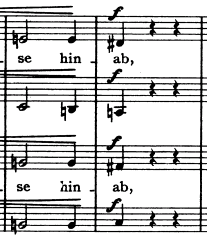
Choral cadence, measure 322

The cadential material then repeats, landing on the tonic C minor in measure 332.

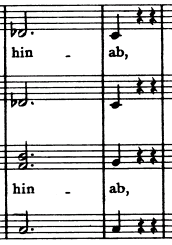
Choral C minor cadence

The second movement closes by way of a 54-measure orchestral section with a C pedal tone and the chorus intermittently repeating the last line of Hölderlin's poem. The addition of E♮s starting in measure 364 predicts the coming modulation to C major for the final movement.

The third movement, marked Adagio, is in C major and returns to common time. This postlude is the same as the orchestral prelude, save for some changes in instrumentation and transposition into C major.
