= Ernst Eduard Taubert =

Pomeranian composer, music critic and professor (1838 - 1934)

Ernst Eduard Taubert (25 September 1838 in Regenwalde – 14 July 1934) was a Pomeranian composer, music critic, and music educator. He began his education in Bonn where he was first a student of theology and later a music pupil of Albert Dietrich. He then studied under Friedrich Kiel in Berlin. He remained in Berlin for the rest of his life where he worked as a music critic for local publications and taught at the Stern Conservatory, first as a lecturer and then as a full professor since 1898. In 1905 he was elected a member of the Prussian Academy of Arts where he taught until his death in Berlin in 1934. He is best remembered today for his Quintet for Piano and Winds, Op. 48 and his String Quartet, Op. 56.
