= Violin Sonata No. 3 (Schumann) =

A sonata in A minor for Violin and Piano by Robert Schumann

- by Robert Schumann
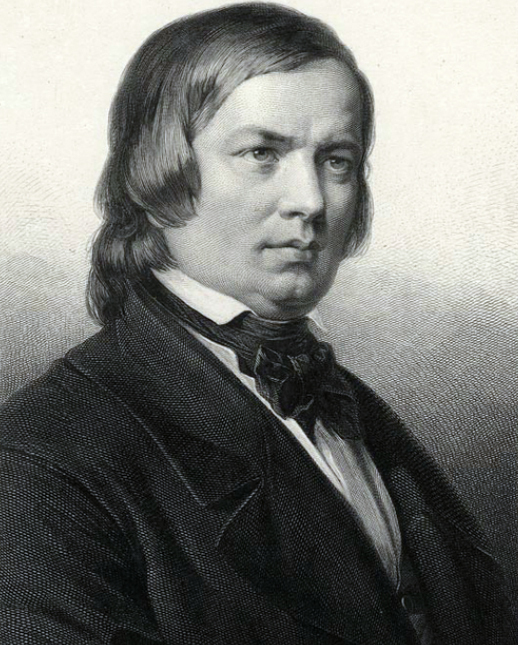
- Key: A minor
- Catalogue: WoO 2
- Period: Romantic
- Genre: Sonata
- Composed: 1853
- Published: 1956
- Duration: 20 minutes
- Movements: 4
- Scoring: Violin and piano

Violin Sonata No. 3 in A minor, WoO 2, is a four-movement work by Robert Schumann for violin and piano. The sonata was composed in 1853 but not fully published until 1956. The work runs for about 20 minutes.

== Composition ==
The Intermezzo and Finale of the sonata were originally written for the F-A-E Sonata which was a joint composition by Schumann, Johannes Brahms, and Albert Dietrich. As a result, these two movements use the notes F, A, and E as a motive throughout. Schumann later added his own first and second movements to make the complete sonata. The work was played privately in 1853 and 1854 but was not published until 1956, a century after the composer's death. The sonata is Schumann's last surviving work.

== Structure ==
The work consists of four movements:

1. Ziemlich langsam – A minor
2. Scherzo – D minor
3. Intermezzo – F major
4. Finale – A minor

== Publication ==
While Schumann's inner circle initially received the work positively, it was kept from publication until well after the composer's death. In 1859 Clara Schumann wrote to publisher Julius Schuberth, "I have decided not to publish the whole Sonata, only the 2nd and 3rd movements ... but I reserve the right to decide the title." After Joseph Joachim reviewed the movements to prepare them for publication, he advised Clara not to publish the work. She subsequently withdrew her offer to the publisher.

The work was eventually published by the Heinrichshofen publishing house, many years after the composer's death.
