= Violin Sonata No. 3 =

Violin Sonata No. 3 may refer to:

- Violin Sonata No. 3 (Bantock) by Granville Bantock
- Violin Sonata No. 3 (Beethoven)
- Violin Sonata No. 3 (Brahms)
- Violin Sonata No. 3 (Enescu)
- Violin Sonata No. 3 (Grieg)
- Violin Sonata No. 3 (Guarnieri) by Camargo Guarnieri
- Violin Sonata No. 3 (Hill)
- Violin Sonata No. 3 (Medtner)
- Violin Sonata No. 3 (Mozart)
- Violin Sonata No. 3 (Schumann)
- Violin Sonata No. 3 (Villa-Lobos) by Heitor Villa-Lobos
- Violin Sonata No. 3 (Ysaÿe)
