= Die Blümelein, sie schlafen =

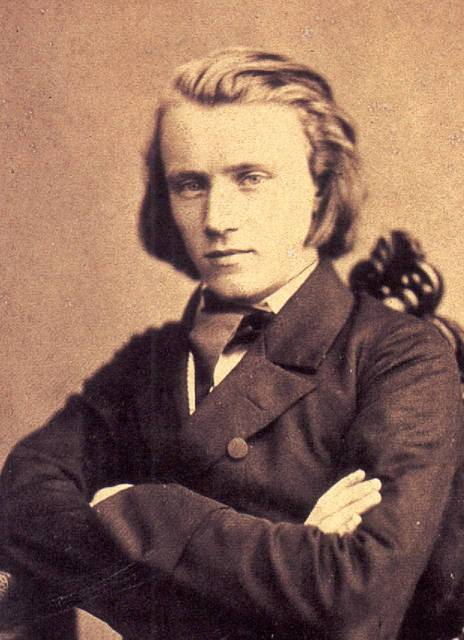
Johannes Brahms (1853)

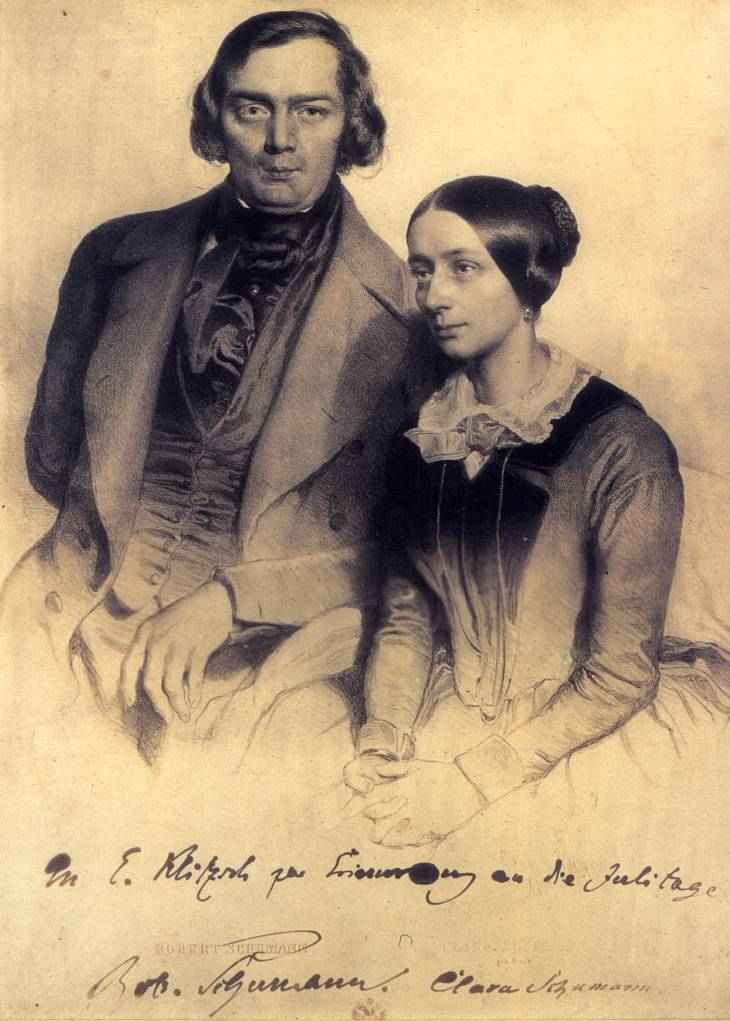
Robert and Clara Schumann (1847)

"Die Blümelein, sie schlafen" is the first line of the German lullaby "Sandmännchen" (Sandman), from Anton Wilhelm von Zuccalmaglio's collection Deutsche Volkslieder (1840). The melody is based on a French song from the late 1500s which was also used for the Christmas carol "Zu Bethlehem geboren" (1638) to a text by Friedrich Spee.

A sandman is a mythical figure in German and other European folk tales who sprinkles sand in the children's eyes at night, making them drowsy and inspiring beautiful dreams.

Johannes Brahms wrote a piano accompaniment for this song in 1858 as no. 4 in his collection 15 Volkskinderlieder (15 Folk Songs for Children), WoO 31. He dedicated this collection to the children of Robert and Clara Schumann.

== Text ==
Die Blümelein, sie schlafen
schon längst im Mondenschein,
sie nicken mit den Köpfen
auf ihren Stengelein.
Es rüttelt sich der Blütenbaum,
er säuselt wie im Traum:
Schlafe, schlafe, schlaf du, mein Kindelein!

Die Vögelein, sie sangen
so süß im Sonnenschein,
sie sind zur Ruh gegangen
in ihre Nestchen klein.
Das Heimchen in dem Ährengrund,
es tut allein sich kund:
Schlafe, schlafe, schlaf du, mein Kindelein!

Sandmännchen kommt geschlichen
und guckt durchs Fensterlein,
ob irgend noch ein Liebchen
nicht mag zu Bette sein.
Und wo er nur ein Kindchen fand,
streut er ihm in die Augen Sand.
Schlafe, schlafe, schlaf du, mein Kindelein!

Sandmännchen aus dem Zimmer,
es schläft mein Herzchen fein,
es ist gar fest verschlossen
schon sein Guckäugelein.
Es leuchtet morgen mir Willkomm
das Äugelein so fromm!
Schlafe, schlafe, schlaf du, mein Kindelein!

The little flowers are sleeping
Already well under the moonlight,
They bow their heads
On their stems.
The flower tree is rustling,
It whispers as in a dream:
Sleep, sleep, you sleep, my little child.

The little birds, they warbled
so sweetly in the sun,
they have gone to slumber
in their little nests.
The cricket on the blade of grass,
Only he coos softly:
Go to sleep, go to sleep, my precious child!

The sandman comes creeping
and peeks through the window,
to see if still a child
might not yet be in bed.
And where he finds even one child,
he scatters the sand in his eyes.
Go to sleep, go to sleep, my precious child!

The sandman exits from the room,
my darling sleeps so well,
his eyes are shuttered firmly,
quite tightly locked the lids.
The welcome dawn illuminates
those little eyes so pure!
Go to sleep, go to sleep, my precious child!
