= F-A-E Sonata =

Collaborative composition for violin and piano

F-A-E
- Sonata for violin and piano by Robert Schumann, Johannes Brahms, and Albert Dietrich
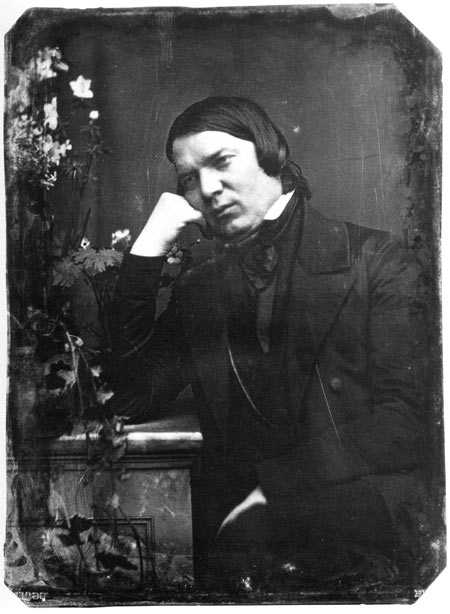
- 1850 daguerreotype of Schumann, the lead composer for the sonata
- Key: A minor
- Period: Romantic era
- Composed: Düsseldorf, October 1853
- Dedication: Joseph Joachim
- Performed: 28 October 1853
- Published: 1935
- Duration: c. 22 minutes
- Movements: 4

The F-A-E Sonata, a four-movement work for violin and piano, is a collaborative musical work by three composers: Robert Schumann, the young Johannes Brahms, and Schumann's pupil Albert Dietrich. It was composed in Düsseldorf in October 1853.

The sonata was Schumann's idea as a gift and tribute to violinist Joseph Joachim, whom the three composers had recently befriended. Joachim had adopted the Romantic German phrase "Frei aber einsam" ("free but lonely") as his personal motto. The composition's movements are all based on the musical notes F-A-E, the motto's initials, as a musical cryptogram.

Schumann assigned each movement to one of the composers. Dietrich wrote the substantial first movement in sonata form. Schumann followed with a short Intermezzo as the second movement. The Scherzo was by Brahms, who had already proven himself a master of this form in his E flat minor Scherzo for piano and the scherzi in his first two piano sonatas. Schumann provided the finale.

Schumann penned the following dedication on the original score: "F.A.E.: In Erwartung der Ankunft des verehrten und geliebten Freundes JOSEPH JOACHIM schrieben diese Sonate R.S., J.B., A.D." ("F.A.E.: In expectation of the arrival of their revered and beloved friend, Joseph Joachim, this sonata was written by R.S., J.B., A.D.").

The composers presented the score to Joachim on 28 October at a soirée in the Schumann household, which Bettina von Arnim and her daughter Gisela also attended. The composers challenged Joachim to determine who composed each movement. Joachim played the work that evening, with Clara Schumann at the piano. Joachim identified each movement's author with ease.

The complete work was not published during the composers' lifetimes. Schumann incorporated his two movements into his Violin Sonata No. 3. Joachim retained the original manuscript, from which he allowed only Brahms's Scherzo to be published in 1906, nearly ten years after Brahms's death. Whether Dietrich made any further use of his sonata-allegro is not known. The complete sonata was first published in 1935.

All three composers also wrote violin concerti for Joachim. Schumann's was completed on 3 October 1853, just before the F-A-E Sonata was begun. Joachim never performed it, unlike the concertos of Brahms and Dietrich.

Steven Isserlis, the English cellist and Schumann aficionado, has transcribed the F-A-E Sonata for cello and piano.

== Recordings ==
Recordings of the sonata on period instruments includes the following ones:

- Isabelle Faust, Alexander Melnikov. Albert Dietrich, Robert Schumann, Johannes Brahms. Violin Sonatas Op. 100 & 108, F.A.E. Sonata. Label: Harmonia Mundi.
- Lisa Marie Landgraf, Tobias Koch. Albert Dietrich, Robert Schumann, Clara Schumann, Johannes Brahms, Joseph Joachim, Ferdinand David. Complete Works for Violin and Pianoforte. Label: Genuin.
- Sergiu Luca, Brian Connelly. Felix Mendelssohn, Clara Schumann, Albert Dietrich, Robert Schumann, Johannes Brahms. Die romantische Violine. Label: Paladino Music.
- Annemarie Astrom, Terhi Dostal. Albert Dietrich, Robert Schumann, Johannes Brahms. F.A.E. Sonata, Two Sonatas Op. 120. Label: NCA.
- Gudrun Schaumann, Wolfgang Brunner. Clara Schumann, Albert Dietrich, Robert Schumann, Johannes Brahms, Carl Reinecke, Theodor Kirchner. Circle of Robert Schumann 2. Label: Capriccio. [Dietrich's Allegro and Brahms's Scherzo only]
- Thomas Albertus Irnberger, Edoardo Torbianelli. Robert Schumann, Johannes Brahms. Werke für Violine und Klavier. Label: Gramola. [Schumann's Intermezzo and Brahms's Scherzo only]
- Helena Dearing, Ilia Korol, Gert Hecher. Johannes Brahms. Die Leiden des jungen Brahms. Label: Schwechtenstein Records. [Brahms's Scherzo only]
