= Pierre Cerveau =

French composer

Pierre Cerveau was a French Baroque composer, born in Anjou and active during the last quarter of the 16th century.

== Biography ==
The name Cerveau first appeared in 1573, as a "passing cantor" in the church's capitularies archives of the Cathedral Sainte-Croix d’Orléans.

Later, the dedication to Charles Miron, the bishop of Angers, of his "Airs" published in 1599 suggests that he could have been in the service of this prelate at that time.

He was quoted in Troyes around 1604, at the time when he was working on putting Lorenza Strozzi's Latin hymns to music at the request of René Breslay, Archdeacon of Angers. (lost works). This last mention suggests that Cerveau remained faithful to the Angevine province throughout his life.

== Works ==
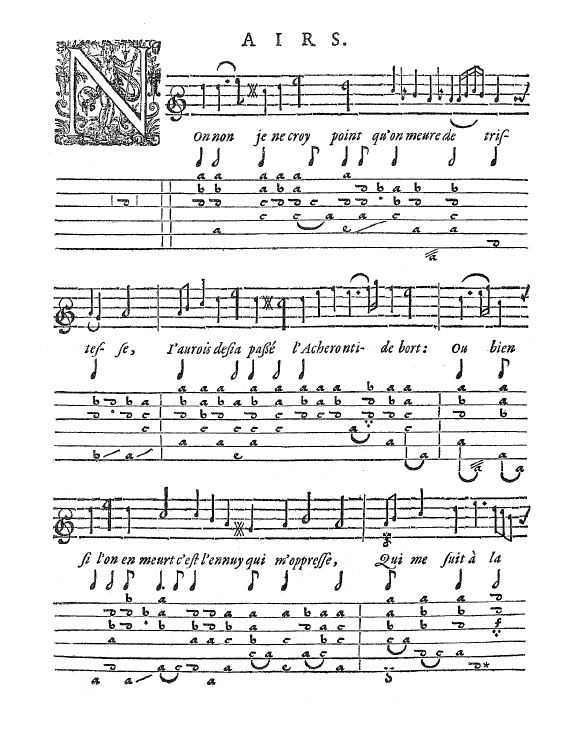
Aria Non je ne crois point for voice and lute (Paris: Pierre I Ballard, 1609).

Cerveau's arias are similar to several styles used at the time, such as ballet arias, old-fashioned tunes or more rhythmic dance arias.

- Airs mis en musique à quatre parties, par Pierre Cerveau Angevin. Paris: Widow Robert I Ballard and her son Pierre I Ballard, 1599. 4 ou 5 vol. in-8° oblong. RISM C 1719, Guillo 2003 n° 1599-B. Only the "Superius" part of this collection is kept. It contains 46 tunes in 4 voices and 6 tunes in 5 voices. Piece 52 is a spiritual aria on the paraphrase of the Libera me, by Philippe Desportes. The texts are taken from Philippe Desportes, Jean-Antoine de Baïf, Jacques Davy Du Perron, Jean Bertaut and Siméon-Guillaume de La Roque. Several of these texts have also been put to music by Pierre Bonnet in his Airs et villanelles mis en musique à 4 et 5 parties, and also by Charles Tessier in his Airs et villanelles françaises, italiennes...

Some of the melodies used by Cerveau can be found in the tunes of Gabriel Bataille and Pierre Guédron - we don't know if they were borrowings or whether both have drawn from a common source. Cerveau explains in the preface of his arias that, "according to the most doctrinal musicians", there are two ways to perform his arias "either with voices simply without an instrument, or with instruments married to the voice." (which, by emphasizing the superior voice, underlines the aria character of these pieces)

Cerveau's arias can still be found in some later collections:

- One aria in Airs nouveaux et chansons à danser... Caen: Jacques Mangeant, 1608. RISM 1608^{9}.
- One aria (Non je ne crois point) in the Airs de différents auteurs, mis en tablature de luth par Gabriel Bataille, second livre. Paris: Pierre I Ballard, 1609. RISM 1609^{13}, Guillo 2003 n° 1609-A.
- Two arias (including Des maux si déplorables), in the Airs de différents auteurs, mis en tablature de luth par Gabriel Bataille, troisième livre. Paris: Pierre I Ballard, 1611. RISM 1611^{10}, Guillo 2003 n° 1611-A.
- One aria (Lorsqu'un amant de cour) in the Airs de différents auteurs, mis en tablature de luth par Gabriel Bataille, sixième livre. Paris: Pierre I Ballard, 1615. RISM 1615^{11}, Guillo 2003 n° 1615-A.
- One aria (Comme nous voyons la rose) in the Amphion sacré, recueilly de quelques excellents musiciens... Lyon: Louis Muguet, 1615. RISM 1615^{7}, Guillo 1991 n° 100. This collection is entirely taken from earlier collections, but the source of Cerveau's aria has not been identified.

In short, the only Cerveau tunes known to be harmonized are those published from 1609.

== Sources ==
RISM : Répertoire international des sources musicales.

- Théodore Gérold, L’art du chant en France au XVIIe siècle Strasbourg: 1921 (BnF 32160423t).
- Laurent Guillo, Pierre I Ballard et Robert III Ballard : imprimeurs du roy pour la musique (1599–1673). Liège: Mardaga et Versailles: CMBV, 2003. 2 vol. ISBN 2-87009-810-3.
- Laurent Guillo. Les Éditions musicales de la Renaissance lyonnaise. Paris: 1991.
- P. Leroy and Henri Herluison, Notes artistiques sur les auteurs dramatiques, les acteurs et les musiciens dans l’Orléanais, "Réunion des sociétés des beaux-arts des départements" 21 (1897), (pp. 766–795).
- Paul-Marie Masson : Jacques Mauduit et les hymnes latines de Laurence Strozzi, Revue de Musicologie 4 (1925), (pp. 6–14), (pp. 59–69).
