= Fest- und Gedenksprüche =

- Motets by Johannes Brahms
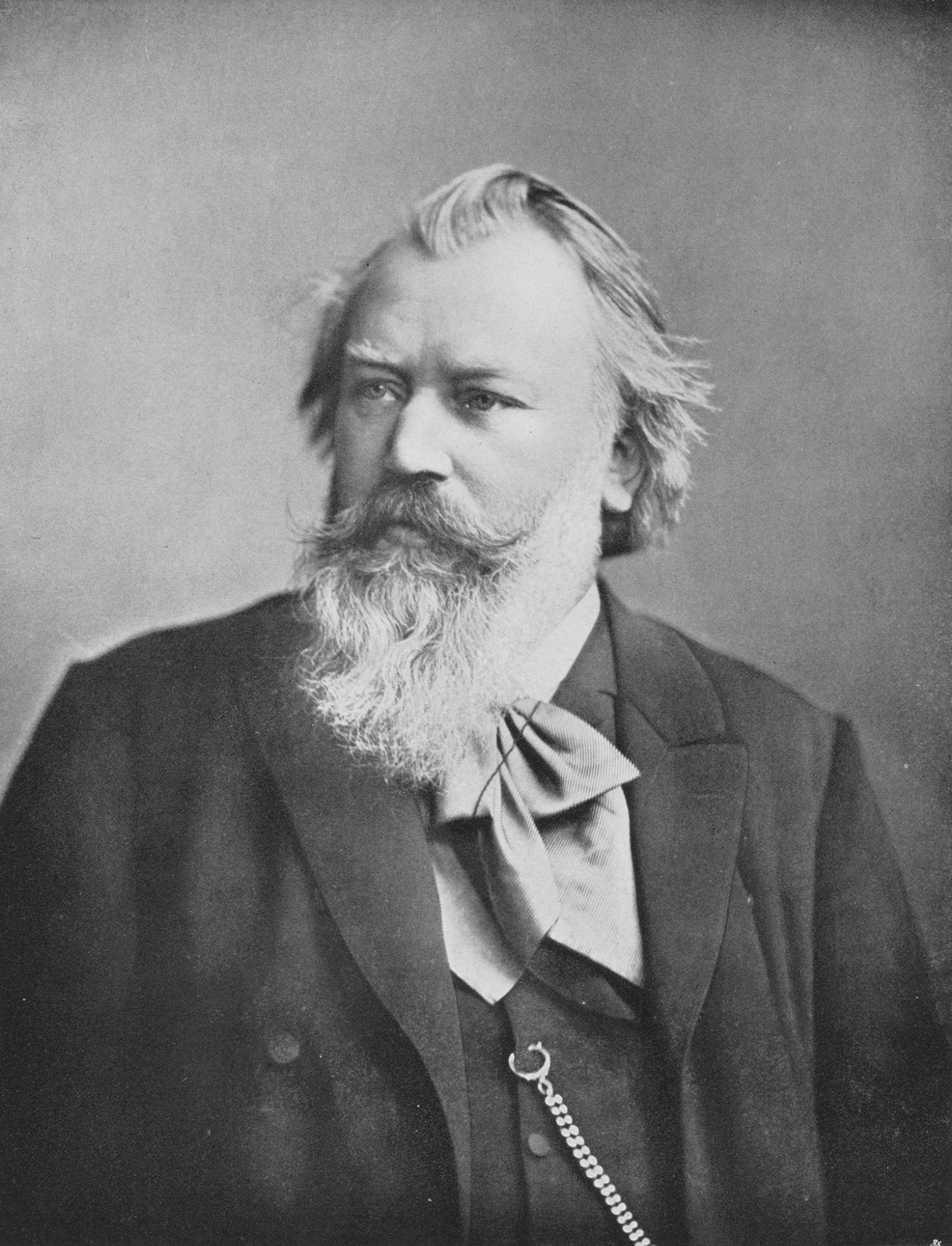
- The composer in 1885
- English: Festival and Commemoration Sentences
- Opus: 109
- Occasion: Honorary citizen of Hamburg ceremony
- Text: Bible
- Language: German
- Composed: 1888
- Dedication: Carl Petersen
- Performed: 9 September 1889: Hamburg
- Movements: three
- Scoring: mixed double choir

Fest- und Gedenksprüche (Festival and Commemoration Sentences), Op. 109, is a cycle of three motets for mixed double choir by Johannes Brahms. He completed the work, setting biblical verses to music, in 1889 and dedicated it to Carl Petersen. It was published in 1890 by Simrock.

Its topic is related to the then-recent unification of Germany in 1871, and the music is suitable for commemorative national festivities.

== History ==
Brahms composed the work in response to his recognition by the city of Hamburg as an honorary citizen. He chose biblical verses in the translation of Martin Luther, and began the composition for a mixed double choir a cappella in 1888. He dedicated the work to Carl Petersen, then the mayor of Hamburg.

The original titles of the three movements are:

1. Unsere Väter hofften auf dich
2. Wenn ein starker Gewappneter
3. Wo ist ein so herrlich Volk

The chosen biblical verses, Sprüche or dicta, are concerned with a people (Volk), its national culture, and tradition passed from fathers to sons. The topics matched the recent unification of Germany to an empire (Kaiserreich) in 1871, which led to festivities in the country. Brahms used a double chorus to illustrate both arguments and unification. His setting has been regarded as "an optimistic bulwark against the centrifugal antagonisms that would soon beset the young German nation".

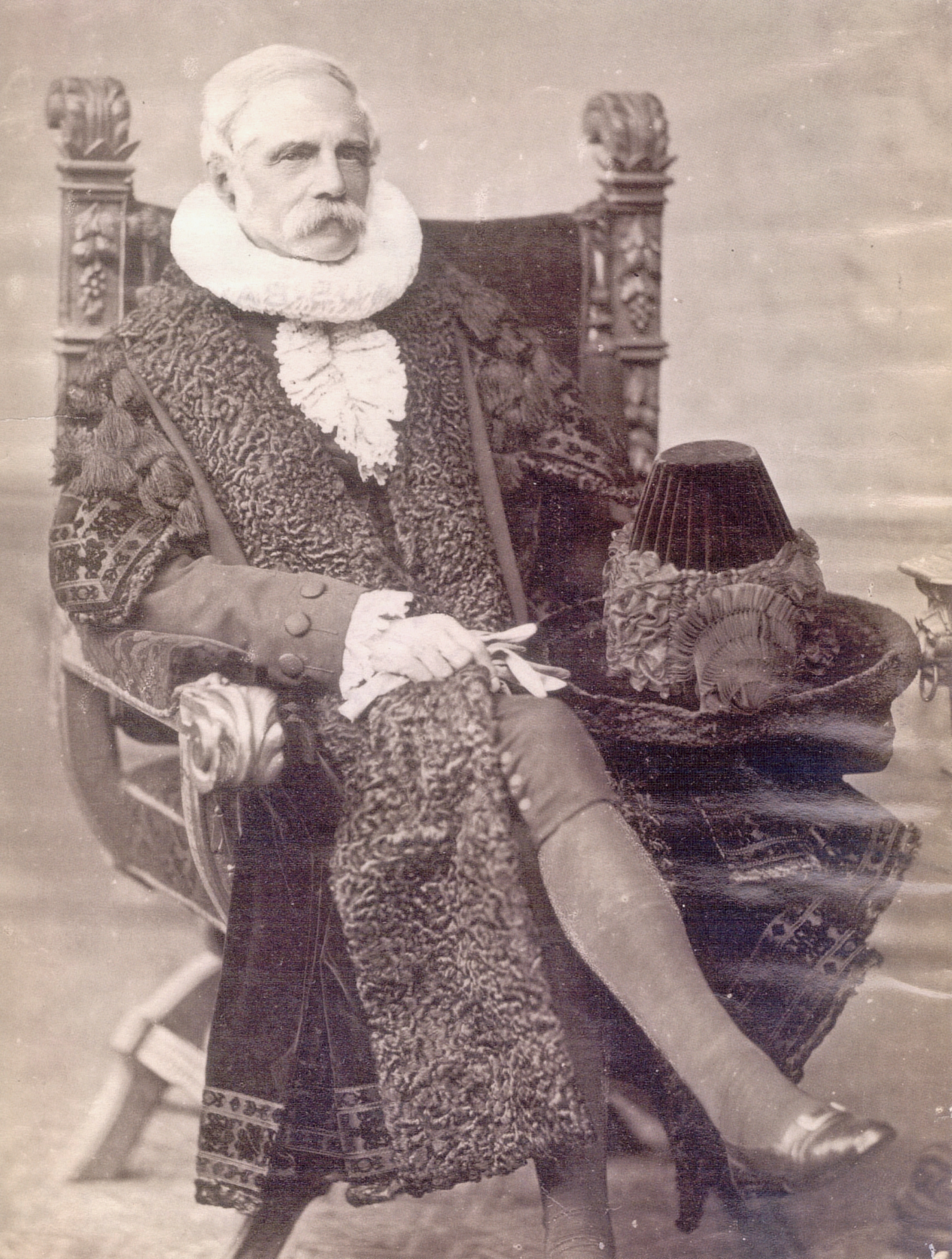
Carl Petersen, to whom the work is dedicated

The work was first performed in Hamburg on 9 September 1889 - with the aid of six brassplayers, three in each chorus (for the support of the alto-, tenor- and bass-singers) - for the ceremony of honorary citizenship by the Cäcilienverein, expanded to around 400 singers, conducted by Julius Spengel. The performance was part of the Musikfest in der Hamburgischen Gewerbe- und Industrieausstellung (Music festival in the Hamburg exposition of trades and industry). It was published by Simrock in February 1890. Performances in Germany followed at festivities commemorating the unified Germany.

== Structure and music ==
The following table shows the incipit, the marking, key and time.

	Beginning of text	Translation	Biblical source	Marking	Key	First Time Signature
I	Unsere Väter hofften auf dich	In you our fathers trusted	Psalms 22:4-5; Psalms 29:11	Feierlich bewegt (Solemnly moving)	F major	3/2
II	Wenn ein starker Gewappneter	When a heavily armed man	Luke 11:21; Luke 11:17; Matthew 12:25	Lebhaft und entschlossen (Lively and determined)	C major	3/4
III	Wo ist ein so herrlich Volk	Where is there such a great nation	Deuteronomy 4:7,9	Froh bewegt (Joyfully moving)	F major	3/4

The first motet, "Unsere Väter hofften auf dich" ("In you our fathers trusted"), is marked Feierlich bewegt (solemnly moving). In triple time, it begins with the choir divided in two four-part groups in the way of Venetian polychoral music. The second choir begins, the first answers a measure later and in an embellished way. It ends in even time, in a passage of free counterpoint for all parts.

The middle motet, "Wenn ein starker Gewappneter" ("When a heavily armed man") is marked Lebhaft und entschlossen (lively and determined). It is a ternary form, with a beginning reminiscent of Handel. The middle section is set in C minor and illustrates dramatically the text "ein Haus fället" (a house falls).

The last motet, "Wo ist ein so herrlich Volk" ("Where is there such a great nation"), is marked Froh bewegt (joyfully moving) . It is set again in Venetian style, with terraced antiphonal singing. It culminates with a recapitulation of its beginning above a pedal point.

== Sources ==
- Fest- und Gedenksprüche, Op.109 (Brahms, Johannes): Scores at the International Music Score Library Project
