= Cello Sonata No. 3 =

Cello Sonata No. 3 may refer to:

- Cello Sonata No. 3 (Beethoven)
- Cello Sonata No. 3 (Ries)
