= Gesang der Parzen =

Choral composition by Johannes Brahms

- Choral composition by Johannes Brahms
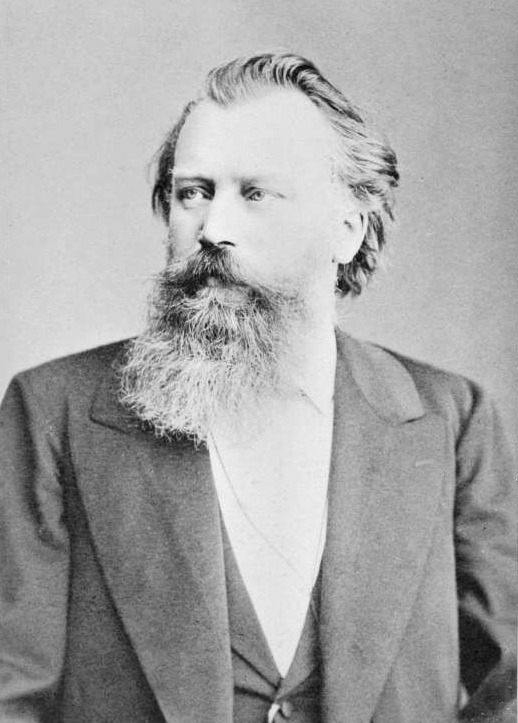
- The composer in 1887
- English: Song of the Fates
- Opus: 89
- Text: from Goethe's Iphigenie auf Tauris
- Language: German
- Composed: 1882
- Performed: 10 December 1882: Basel
- Scoring: six-part choir and orchestra

Gesang der Parzen (Song of the Fates), Op. 89, is a piece for mixed choir and orchestra by Johannes Brahms. The work uses a text from Goethe's Iphigenie auf Tauris (which had earlier been set for four voices by Johann Friedrich Reichardt). Written in one movement, the piece was composed in 1882, premiered in Basel on 10 December of the same year, and published in 1883.

It is written for six-part choir (altos and basses divided into two) and an orchestra comprising two flutes (one doubling piccolo), two oboes, two B♭ clarinets, two bassoons, double bassoon, two French horns in D, two French horns in F, two trumpets, alto, tenor and bass trombones, tuba, timpani and strings.

The piece is not often performed but has been recorded several times and has had its fans: Anton Webern admired a passage in the coda built on a cycle of major thirds and asserted that Brahms's harmonic practice was more advanced than Richard Wagner's.

== Bibliography ==
- Webern, Anton. 1963. The Path to the New Music, ed. Willi Reich, trans. Leo Black. Bryn Mawr, Pennsylvania: Theodore Presser Co., in Association with Universal Edition. Reprinted London: Universal Edition, 1975. Trans. of Der Wege zur neuen Musik, Vienna: Universal Edition, 1960.
