= Piano Trio in A major (attributed to Brahms) =

Musical composition attributed to Johannes Brahms

The Piano Trio in A major, sometimes attributed to Johannes Brahms as Anh. 4/5, is scored for piano, violin and cello. Brahms is reported to have destroyed many of his works that did not meet his own high standards. This piano trio may be one of the exceptions to have survived.

== Background ==
=== Discovery and publication ===
The trio first came to light in 1924 when it was discovered amongst papers musicologist Ernst Bücken had inherited from the Bonn-based musical collector Erich Preiger.

Despite the fact that the manuscript lacked a title page and was in the hand of an unknown copyist rather than Brahms' own handwriting, Bücken believed the work was genuine based both on perceived stylistic similarities between the newly discovered work and the Piano Trio No. 1 in B major, Op. 8 and the fact that it was known from a letter to Schumann that prior to the publication of the B major trio he had composed several others.

The trio was published by Breitkopf & Härtel in 1938, in an edition edited by both Bücken and Karl Hasse. The original manuscript on which it was based disappeared shortly after publication.

=== Authorship ===
Bücken's attribution of the trio to Brahms was challenged a year after publication in an article by Richard Fellinger, who while supporting the attribution brought up the possibility that the trio, which was apparently written in the 1850s, may have been composed by a friend of Brahms, Albert Dietrich.

McClelland notes that while most recent scholarship argues that Brahms did not compose this trio, few alternatives have been offered other than Dietrich. Christiansen, in his article, notes that while some portions of the trio sound like the work of Brahms, especially the opening theme of the trio portion of the second movement, other portions evoke Beethoven, Schubert, Schumann and even Dvořák and concludes that the trio may be the work either of Brahms at an early stage of his development, or by a talented composer, moving in similar circles to Brahms, who never rose to prominence.

Stephen Schafer in his notes to the recording by the Macquarie Trio echoes this latter comment, adding that in his view some portions of the trio have resemblances to the style of Mendelssohn.

== Structure ==
The trio is in four movements:

1. Moderato
2. Vivace — Trio
3. Lento
4. Presto

The first movement, in sonata form, begins with a quiet, broad melody shared between piano and cello, building from the low register in a manner comparable to the opening of Op. 8, which eventually leads to a more extroverted second theme.

The second movement is a rousing scherzo in F♯ minor, similarly building from a quiet, low-register beginning; this contrasts with the gentle trio in B major (major-mode IV in relation to F♯ minor). The return of the scherzo builds as before to a turbulent, galloping climax and finishes abruptly with no added coda.

The D major Lento begins with a chordal passage on piano, which is then turned into a string duo with piano in the middle of the texture; the second thematic idea resembles a funeral march in B minor.

The final movement opens with a rapid, chromatically descending theme with a vigorous drive; these characteristics also inflect the quietly joyful second theme.
