= Albert Dietrich =

German composer and conductor

- Born: Albert Hermann Dietrich; August 28, 1829; Golk, near Meissen, Kingdom of Saxony
- Died: November 20, 1908 (aged 79) Berlin, German Empire
- Occupations: Composer, conductor

Albert Hermann Dietrich (28 August 1829 – 20 November 1908), was a German composer and conductor. In addition to his work, he is remembered for his friendship with Johannes Brahms.

Dietrich was born at Golk, near Meissen. From 1851 he studied composition with Robert Schumann in Düsseldorf, where in October 1853 he first met Brahms and collaborated with Schumann and Brahms on the 'F-A-E' Sonata for Joseph Joachim (Dietrich composed the substantial first movement). From 1861 until 1890 he was the musical director at the court of Oldenburg, where Brahms often visited him and where he introduced many of Brahms's works. It was in Dietrich's library that Brahms discovered the volume of poetry by Hölderlin that furnished him with the text for his Schicksalslied, which he began composing while visiting Wilhelmshaven dockyard in Dietrich's company. Dietrich was also instrumental in arranging for the premiere of Brahms's German Requiem at Bremen in 1868. Dietrich's own works include an opera Robin Hood, a Symphony in D minor (1869, dedicated to Brahms), a Violin Concerto in the same key (composed for Joseph Joachim but premiered in 1874 by Johann Lauterbach), a Cello Concerto, Horn Concerto, choral works and several chamber compositions including two piano trios.

Dietrich's Recollections of Brahms, published in Leipzig in 1898, was translated into English the following year and remains an important biographical source. The Brahms scholar David Brodbeck has theorized (The Cambridge Companion to Brahms, 1999) that Dietrich is the most likely author of the anonymous Piano Trio in A major, discovered in 1924, which some scholars have attributed to Brahms; but Malcolm MacDonald (Brahms, 2nd ed, 2001) has maintained that, if any specific composer is to be sought for this work, Dietrich remains the more likely candidate on balance of stylistic probabilities.

Albert Dietrich died in Berlin. One of his students was Ernst Eduard Taubert.
