= Wolfgang Marschner =

German classical violinist and conductor (1926–2020)

- Born: 23 May 1926; Dresden, Saxony, Germany
- Died: 24 March 2020 (aged 93); Freiburg im Breisgau, Germany
- Occupations: Violinist; Conductor; Composer; Academic techer; Festival director
- Organizations: WDR Sinfonieorchester Köln; Folkwang-Hochschule; Musikhochschule Köln; Tokyo University of Fine Arts and Music; Hochschule für Musik Freiburg

Wolfgang Marschner (23 May 1926 – 24 March 2020) was a German violinist, teacher of violin, composer and conductor. He was concertmaster of the WDR Sinfonieorchester Köln, and instrumental in world premieres of contemporary music. He was professor at the Folkwang-Hochschule Essen, the Musikhochschule Köln, the Tokyo University of Fine Arts and Music and, for more than three decades, at the Hochschule für Musik Freiburg. He also taught at the Darmstädter Ferienkurse.

== Life ==
Marschner was born in Dresden in 1926. He came from an old musical family, whose most famous representative was the opera composer Heinrich Marschner. At the age of four he became the youngest member of the orchestra school of the Staatskapelle Dresden. He made his debut playing Tartini's Devil's Trill Sonata at age nine. He studied from age 14 at the Mozarteum in Salzburg, where, inspired by Váša Příhoda, Clemens Krauss and Ermanno Wolf-Ferrari, he composed his 1. Divertimento for String Quartet under the direction of the First Concertmaster of the Mozarteum Orchestra Salzburg. At the age of barely seventeen, Marschner was drafted into military service. After the end of World War II, he studied in Hamburg with Erich Röhn, concertmaster of the Berlin Philharmonic. At the same time, he became soloist, concertmaster and second conductor of the Staatsoper Hannover and played Brahms's Violin Concerto with Franz Konwitschny, who engaged him for further concerts with the Dresden Staatskapelle and the Leipzig Gewandhaus Orchestra. In 1947 he became concertmaster of the WDR Sinfonieorchester Köln, where he played the German premiere of William Walton's Violin Concerto. As a conductor, he led a production of the operetta Ein Walzertraum by Oscar Straus, with the Viennese singer Gretl Schörg.

Marschner died in March 2020 at the age of 93.

=== Teaching ===
At the age of twenty-six, Marschner became a professor at the Folkwang-Hochschule Essen and then taught at the Musikhochschule Köln from 1958 to 1963. As primarius of the Cologne String Quartet with Maurits Frank, the cellist of the Amar Quartet, he combined the quartet's worldwide engagements with his tasks as soloist, conductor, composer and pedagogue. He represented the German violin school also as a professor at the Tokyo University of Fine Arts and Music. He was professor of violin at the Hochschule für Musik Freiburg from 1963 to 1997. Marschner gave master classes in Ankara, Beijing, London, St. Petersburg, Warsaw, Weimar, and in Łańcut Castle in Poland. He was a juror of international competitions, and founded the International Violin Competition "Ludwig Spohr" in Freiburg im Breisgau in 1976. He founded his own chamber orchestra, the Kammerorchester Wolfgang Marschner, in the 1970s. Marschner founded the Deutsche Spohr Akademie, an international academy for violin, viola and cello, and the Marschner Festival Hinterzarten in 1976, to promote young artists who played chamber music for strings. It included from 1992 a triennial International Marschner Competition for Violin and Viola as well as the International Violin Making and Violin Sound Competition "Jacobus Stainer" initiated by Marschner. Marschner became also director of the Pflüger Foundation which maintains a school for string players until age 16 with a focus on chamber music.

Marschner focused on the study of the Second Viennese School around Arnold Schönberg which had been banned in Germany before 1945. He took part in the Darmstädter Ferienkurse from 1954.

=== Performing career ===
Marschner's recording of Schoenberg's Violin Concerto with Michael Gielen and the SWR Sinfonieorchester Baden-Baden und Freiburg was critically acclaimed. Other examples of Marschner's involvement with the Second Viennese School include the concerto with the Vienna Symphony Orchestra and Gielen, with the Royal Philharmonic Orchestra under Pierre Boulez in London, with the Tonhalle-Orchester Zürich conducted by Hans Rosbaud, with the Dresden Staatskapelle under Otmar Suitner, with the MDR Sinfonieorchester conducted by Herbert Kegel, with Stockholmers conducted by Herbert Blomstedt, both with the Scottish National Orchestra at the 1959 Edinburgh Festival, which meant the British premiere. He also played it with the London Symphony Orchestra conducted by Alexander Gibson, with the BBC Symphony Orchestra and Norman Del Mar, and with the Philharmonic Orchestra of the City of Freiburg, which he also conducted himself.

Marschner performed Alban Berg's Violin Concerto with the BBC Symphony Orchestra and Bruno Maderna, with the Wiesbaden Symphony Orchestra conducted by Gielen, with the Royal Liverpool Philharmonic Orchestra conducted by Charles Groves, with the hr-Sinfonieorchester under Mario Rossi, with the Radio-Sinfonieorchester Stuttgart conducted by Hans Müller-Kray, and with the RSO Helsinki and Nils-Eric Fougstedt.

He performed in Alban Berg's Chamber Concerto for Piano, Violin with 13 Wind Instruments with the Bavarian Radio Symphony Orchestra and soloists Marschner and pianist Carl Seemann, conducted by Paul Hindemith, the Dresden Staatskapelle with Edouard Steuermann and Scherchen, with the Berlin Philharmonic also with Carl Seemann conducted by Werner Egk, with the Paris Symphony conducted by Pierre Boulez, with the Liverpool Philharmonic and Wilfred Parry conducted by John Pritchard and with the Hallé Orchestra Manchester conducted by John Barbirolli.

==== Premieres ====
Marschner played world premieres such as Luigi Nono's Il Varianti in Palermo, violin concertos by Winfried Zillig with Hans Schmidt-Isserstedt in Hamburg, by Bernd Alois Zimmermann in Cologne, by Igor Stravinsky in Cairo, and other works. As a premiere, Marschner performed the revised version of Karl Amadeus Hartmann's Concerto funebre in Braunschweig in 1959 with the local Staatstheaterkapelle conducted by Heinz Zeebe. He first performed works by Karlheinz Stockhausen, beginning with the Sonatine for violin and piano, with the composer as the pianist, in a broadcast as the first public performance of a work by Stockhausen. He also played first performances of works by Pierre Boulez, by Schoenberg's student Eduard Steuermann, by Australian Don Banks whose work was written for him for a Proms performance in 1968, and by Raphaël Cendo. At the Darmstädter Ferienkurse, he played the premiere of Franco Evangelisti's "4!", Due piccoli pezzi per pianoforte e violino in 1954, and Giacomo Manzoni's Seconda piccola suite per violino e pianoforte with Aloys Kontarsky in 1957.

== Compositions ==
=== Concertante ===
Marschner's concertos for string instruments occupy a central position in his oeuvre.

At the premiere of his First Violin Concerto with the Staatskapelle Dresden and Thomas Egel as soloist, which Marschner conducted, the Dresden press described the concerto as an "important contemporary work". In performances with the Rostov-on-Don Philharmonic and the Voronezh Symphony Orchestra, also with the composer as conductor and the Russian violinist Olga Pogorelova, it was described as one of the best instrumental concerts of the twentieth century. It enjoyed particular success in Odessa, with the New Polish Philharmonic, with the Max Bruch Philharmonic in Sondershausen and with the Beethoven Festival Orchestra in Rome and the German soloist Ariane Mathäus, as well as in Zagreb with the Philharmonic Orchestra there.

The high-ranking performances of his Second Violin Concerto with Rainer Kussmaul and the American violinist Oleg Kryssa in Weimar as well as his own interpretations found great resonance among Japanese experts, at the Kirishima Festival, in Tokyo and Osaka, among others.

Marschner's Viola Concerto with himself as soloist was also premiered in Tokyo. Since then, many violists have included it in their repertoire as a symphonic enrichment, and it was performed with overwhelming audience response at the International Master Classes Sondershausen by Loh-Orchester Sondershausen "Max-Bruch-Philharmonie", conducted by the Japanese conductor Hiroaki Masuda, as well as in Saint Petersburg.

His Cello Concerto is dedicated to the Italian solo cellist of La Scala in Milan, Alfredo Persichilli, who also played the premiere in Rome and was soloist in the German premiere with the Baden-Baden Philharmonic.

=== Orchestral ===
- Symphony No. 1 "Don Sinfonie", Sinf.Orch.Voronezh 1998, conducted by Marschner
- Symphony No. 2 for string orchestra, Spohr Philharmonie
- Symphony No. 3 "nach Bildern von Hans Thoma", Festival Hinterzarten
- Violin Concerto No. 1, Dresdner Staatskapelle
- Violin Concerto No. 2 for violin and string orchestra, Weimar – Kryssa. Tokyo – Marschner 2003
- Violin Concerto No. 3 for violin, organ, choir and orchestra
- Liguria Fantasie, WDR Cologne
- Clarinet Concerto, 1949
- Andante Lirico for string orchestra, Osaka Kammerorchester
- Viola Concerto, Geida Orchester Tokyo 2004
- Cello Concerto, Philharmonie Rom, Persichilli
- Paganini-Variationen for violin and orchestra, Kirishima Festival Japan
- Concertante for violin, cello and orchestra, Lancut Festival Poland 2002
- Trittico for violin, viola and cello, New Polish Philharmonie 2004
- Fantasie Espagnole for violin and orchestra, WDR Cologne 1951

=== Chamber music ===
- Epilog for piano quartet, Lenzerheide Schweizer Musikwochen
- Piano Trio, Reger Trio Rom
- Liguria for two pianos, Pogorelov Duo Russland
- Streichquartett-Sonett, Beethoven Festival Sutri Skiba Quartett
- Canto notturno for violin and organ
- Rondo brillant for violin and piano
- Deutsche Epigramme for two violas
- Sonata for violin solo
- Rhapsodie for viola solo

=== Cadences ===
Marschner wrote cadences to violin concertos, Mozart's concertos No. 1 in B-flat major and No. 2 in D major, Beethoven's Violin Concerto, Schumann's Violin Concerto, the Violin Concerto, by Wolf-Ferrari, and Spohr's Violinkonzert Nr. 8 in A minor "in Form einer Gesangsszene".

== Honours ==
- 1986: Verdienstorden der Bundesrepublik Deutschland
- Honorary Award of the City of Sondershausen 11 June 2006.
- Honorary member of the Max-Bruch-Gesellschaft
- 2011: Honorary Plate (Ehrenteller) of Hinterzarten.
