= Gesangsszene =

Composition by Karl Amadeus Hartmann

Gesangsszene (Song Scene) is the final composition of German composer Karl Amadeus Hartmann. It sets in translation part of Jean Giraudoux's drama Sodome et Gomorrhe (Sodom and Gomorrah) for baritone and orchestra, with some of the text spoken; the final strophe, left uncomposed at Hartmann's death in 1963, is entirely spoken and unaccompanied. A performance lasts around 25 minutes.

Begun in 1962, in the early stages of the Cold War, in the apocalyptic vision of Giraudoux's setting, it reflects Hartmann's ongoing concerns with the folly of empire-building. Hartmann had resisted the Nazi regime in the 1930s and 1940s and had witnessed the development of other, violent successors, so his use of Giraudoux's text suggests an ongoing folly, that the constructors of empire never learn.

Gesangsszene was premiered in Frankfurt on 12 November 1964 by Dietrich Fischer-Dieskau, for whom it had been written, and the orchestra of the Hessischer Rundfunk under Dean Dixon. Neglected for several years thereafter, the work has recently become more established in the repertoire, with baritones such as Matthias Goerne and Christian Gerhaher championing its cause.
