= Sophie Pacini =

German-Italian pianist

Sophie Pacini (born December 12, 1991, in Munich) is a German-Italian pianist.

== Life and professional career ==
Sophie Pacini born of a German mother and an Italian father, passed her concert exam with honors at the Mozarteum University Salzburg aged 19. She studied there from the age 10 at the Institute for Highly Gifted Leopold Mozart of the local university under Karl-Heinz Kämmerling and Pavel Gililov, while she continued to join master classes of Dmitri Bashkirov and Fou Ts'ong.

Since her concert debut at the age of 8 in 2000, Sophie Pacini has appeared in many renowned concert halls across the world including Tokyo Suntory Hall, Philharmonie Berlin, Konzerthaus Berlin, Konzerthaus Vienna, Wigmore Hall London, Philharmonie am Gasteig Munich, Herkulessaal Munich, Gewandhaus Leipzig, Elbphilharmonie and Laeiszhalle Hamburg, Tonhalle Zürich, Lucerne Culture and Congress Centre, La Seine Musicale Paris, Centre for Fine Arts, Brussels / BOZAR, Hong Kong City Hall, Cape Town City Hall.

In recital, she has performed at international festivals such as Salzburger Festspiele, Piano Lucerne Festival, Klavier-Festival Ruhr, Piano Festival aux Jacobins Toulouse, Kammermusikfest Lockenhaus with Gidon Kremer, Rheingau Musik Festival, Schwetzinger Festspiele, Festspiele Mecklenburg-Vorpommern, Progetto Martha Argerich Lugano and Martha Argerich Festival Hamburg.

As soloist, Sophie Pacini has appeared with orchestras such as Gewandhaus Orchester Leipzig, Tokyo Philharmonic Orchestra, Tonhalle-Orchester Zürich, Luzerner Sinfonieorchester, Bournemouth Symphony Orchestra, Wiener Kammerorchester, Dresdner Philharmonie, Camerata Salzburg, Munich Radio Orchestra, Württemberg Chamber Orchestra Heilbronn, Mozarteum Orchestra Salzburg, Bern Symphony Orchestra and Orchestra del Maggio Musicale Fiorentino.

Sophie Pacini has designed and moderated a new broadcast format for Deutschlandfunk and Südwestrundfunk.

Simce 2023 Sophie Pacini has curated her own festival "Nuancen" in her hometown of Aying

Since 2023 Sophie is full member of the European Academy of Sciences and Arts.

== Discography ==
- 2012 Schumann Piano Concerto A Minor op.54 and Mozart Piano Concerto E Flat Major K.271, Staatsphilharmonie Rheinland-Pfalz, conductor Radoslaw Szulc (Onyx Classics)
- 2012 Schumann and Liszt (Avi Music)
- 2014 "Chopin" (Avi Music)
- 2016 "Solo Piano" - Beethoven and Liszt (Warner Classics)
- 2018 "In Between" - Robert Schumann and Clara Schumann - Mendelssohn Bartholdy and Fanny Hensel (Warner Classics)
- 2020 "Rimembranza" - Mozart, Schubert, Schubert-Liszt, Love Theme by Andrea Morricone (from the film "Cinema paradiso")( Avenir)
- 2022 "Boundless" - Poulenc, Bernstein, Weinberg, Prokofiev - Duo: Sophie Pacini (Piano) - Pablo Barragán (Clarinet) (Aparté - Label)
- 2022 "(DVD) "Sophie Pacini & Martha Argerich - New Year’s Impression from Vienna" (Arthaus)
- 2023 "Puzzle" Chopin and Scriabin, Outhere / Fuga libera
- 2025 "bittersweet"- Handel, Mozart,Chopin, Debussy, Brahms, Schumann (Deutsche Grammophon - Avenir

== Awards ==
- 2011 "Prix Groupe Edmond de Rothschild-Thierry Scherz" at Sommets musicaux de Gstaad
- 2011 Förderpreis Deutschlandfunk at Bremer Musikfest-Preis
- 2011 Fellowship Holder - Mozart-Gesellschaft Dortmund
- 2015 ECHO Klassik as "Newcomer of the Year"
- 2017 International Classical Music Award (ICMA)] as "Young Artist of the Year"
- 2023 Member of the European Academy of Sciences and Arts.
