= Otto Frickhoeffer =

German composer and conductor

Otto Frickhoeffer (29 March 1892 – 9 April 1968) was a German composer and conductor.

== Life ==
Born in Bad Schwalbach as the son of a medical officer, Frickhoeffer wanted to become a musician. Since the father insisted on studying medicine, Frickhoeffer enrolled at the Ludwig-Maximilians-Universität München. In the summer semester of 1911 he became active in the Corps Brunsviga Munich. As Inaktiver he changed to the Ruprecht-Karls-Universität Heidelberg. Only when he had passed the Physikum there did his parents agree to a career as a pianist. The First World War interrupted the hopeful beginning. Not fully fit for service at the Western Front, he was used during his medical training to take care of wounded transports. When the war ended, his hands were no longer suitable for playing the piano. One way out was to study musical composition and conducting. From 1918 Frickhoeffer lived in Berlin as a singing teacher and composer.

Richard Wagner: "Titurel, der fromme Held" from Parsifal, excerpt from a 1942 recording with the Frankfurt Radio Symphony (role of Gurnemanz sung by Hellmut Schwebs, bass)

Ernst Klee quotes from the Nazi reference work Das Deutsche Führerlexikon as having been involved in Frickhoeffer's political activities with the Alldeutscher Verband and the Citizens' Defense after the First World War and was later a member of the Nazi Party. In addition, he was head of the Kampfbund für deutsche Kultur (KfdK). In 1933 he took part in the festival Young Germany in Music, which was organised by the Kampfbund für deutsche Kultur in Bad Pyrmont. From 1934 to 1936 he worked as conductor for the Reichs-Rundfunk-Gesellschaft. The NSDAP sent him to the Reichssender Frankfurt as musical special representative. After Gleichschaltung, he was to support the political course by means of radio music. Works by German/Austrian composers – Bach, Beethoven, Brahms, Bruckner und Wagner were requested. At the end of 1937 he became first Kapellmeister of the Frankfurter Rundfunk-Symphonie-Orchester (later hr-Sinfonieorchester). Then he followed Hans Rosbaud as chief conductor and head of the music department of the radio station from which the Hessischer Rundfunk emerged in 1945. In the post-war period in Germany, marginalized and not robustly inclined from the outset, Frickhoeffer had to endure difficult years. Paralysed by a stroke, he was bedridden from 1960 onwards. He died shortly after his 76th birthday in a Schwalbach nursing home.

== Literature ==
- Ernst Klee: Das Kulturlexikon zum Dritten Reich. Wer war was vor und nach 1945. S. Fischer, Frankfurt, 2007, ISBN 978-3-10-039326-5.
