= Kammerkonzert =

Kammerkonzert is the German translation of chamber concerto. Other uses include:

- "Kammerkonzert" (Berg), 1927 double concerto by Alban Berg
- Kammerkonzert (Hartmann), concerto by Karl Amadeus Hartmann
- "Kammerkonzert 05", a 2005 version of Hans Werner Henze's "Symphony No. 1"
- Kammerkonzert (album), 2026 album by Squarepusher
