= Dietrich Fischer-Dieskau =

German baritone (1925–2012)

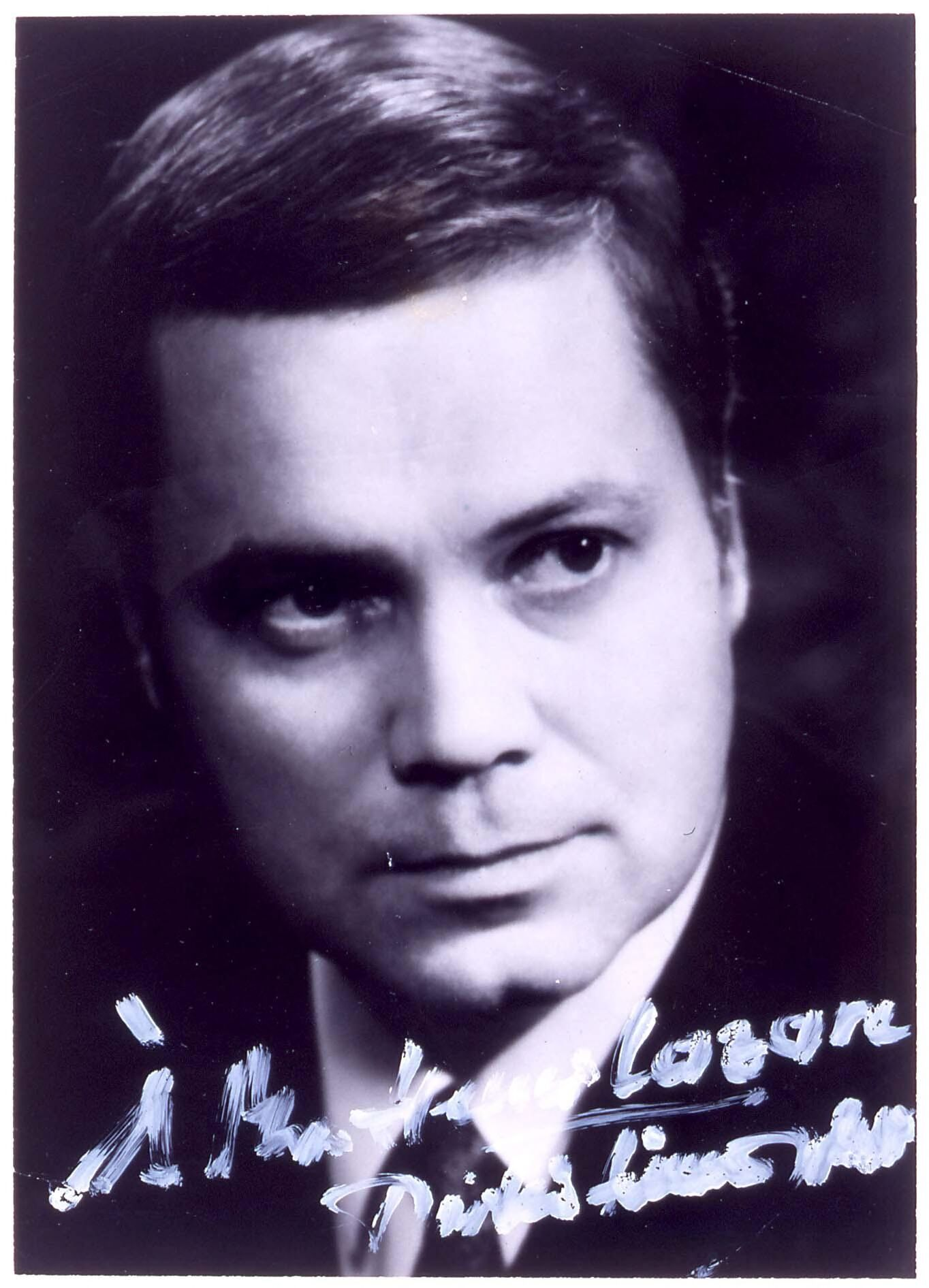
- Born: Albert Dietrich Fischer; 28 May 1925; Berlin, Germany
- Died: 18 May 2012 (aged 86); Berg, Upper Bavaria, Germany
- Education: Berlin Conservatory
- Occupations: Opera/lieder singer (baritone); conductor; singing teacher
- Years active: 1947–2012
- Spouses: Irmgard Poppen (m. 1949; died 1963) Ruth Leuwerik (m. 1965; div. 1967) Kristina Pugell (m. 1968; div. 1975) Júlia Várady (m. 1977)
- Children: 3 including Martin Fischer-Dieskau

Dietrich Fischer-Dieskau (German: [ˌdiːtʁɪç ˌfɪʃɐ ˈdiːskaʊ̯]; 28 May 1925 – 18 May 2012) was a German lyric baritone and conductor of classical music. One of the most famous Lieder (art song) performers of the post-war period, he is best known as a singer of Franz Schubert's Lieder, particularly "Winterreise" of which his recordings with accompanists Gerald Moore and Jörg Demus are still critically acclaimed half a century after their release.

Because he recorded an array of repertoire (spanning centuries), musicologist Alan Blyth asserted, "No singer in our time, or probably any other has managed the range and versatility of repertory achieved by Dietrich Fischer-Dieskau. Opera, Lieder and oratorio in German, Italian or English came alike to him, yet he brought to each a precision and individuality that bespoke his perceptive insights into the idiom at hand." In addition, he recorded in French, Russian, Hebrew, Latin and Hungarian. He was described as "one of the supreme vocal artists of the 20th century" and "the most influential singer of the 20th Century".

Fischer-Dieskau was ranked the second greatest singer of the century (after Jussi Björling) by Classic CD (United Kingdom) "Top Singers of the Century" Critics' Poll (June 1999). The French dubbed him "Le miracle Fischer-Dieskau" and Dame Elisabeth Schwarzkopf called him "a born god who has it all." At his peak, he was greatly admired for his interpretive insights and exceptional control of his soft, beautiful voice. He dominated both the opera and concert platforms for over thirty years.

== Life and career ==
Albert Dietrich Fischer was born in 1925 in Berlin to Albert Fischer, a school principal, and Theodora (née Klingelhoffer) Fischer, a teacher. In 1934, his father added the hyphenated "Dieskau" to the family name (through his mother, he was descended from the Kammerherr von Dieskau, for whom Johann Sebastian Bach wrote the "Peasant Cantata"). He started singing as a child and began formal voice lessons at the age of 16. When he was drafted into the Wehrmacht during World War II in 1943, tending horses on the Russian Front, Fischer-Dieskau had just completed his secondary school studies and one semester at the Berlin Conservatory. He served in Grenadier Regiment 146 of the 65th Infantry Division south of Bologna in the winter of 1944–45 and entertained his comrades at soldiers' evenings behind the lines.

He was captured in Italy in 1945 and spent two years as an American prisoner of war. During that time, he sang Lieder in POW camps to homesick German soldiers. He had a physically and intellectually impaired brother, Martin, who was sent to an institution by the Nazi regime and starved to death. Their family home was destroyed during the war.

=== Singing career ===
In 1947, Fischer-Dieskau returned to Germany, where he launched his professional career as a singer in Badenweiler, singing in Brahms's Ein Deutsches Requiem without any rehearsal. (He was a last-minute substitute for an indisposed singer.) He gave his first Lieder recital in Leipzig in late 1947 and followed it soon afterwards with a highly successful first concert at Berlin's Titania-Palast.

From early in his career he collaborated with famous lyric sopranos Elisabeth Schwarzkopf and Irmgard Seefried, and the recording producer Walter Legge, issuing instantly successful albums of Lieder by Schubert and Hugo Wolf.

In late 1948, Fischer-Dieskau was engaged as principal lyric baritone at the Städtische Oper Berlin (Municipal Opera, West Berlin), making his debut as Posa in Verdi's Don Carlos under Ferenc Fricsay. This company, known after 1961 as the Deutsche Oper, would remain his artistic home until his retirement from the operatic stage, in 1978.

Subsequently, Fischer-Dieskau made guest appearances at the Vienna State Opera and the Bavarian State Opera. After 1949 he made concert tours in the Netherlands, Switzerland, France and Italy. In 1951, he made his Salzburg Festival concert debut with Mahler's Lieder eines fahrenden Gesellen conducted by Wilhelm Furtwängler. The same year he also made his British debut, at the Royal Albert Hall in London during the Festival of Britain. He appeared in Frederick Delius's A Mass of Life, conducted by Sir Thomas Beecham. He made regular opera appearances at the Bayreuth Festival between 1954 and 1961 and at the Salzburg Festival from 1956 until the early 1970s.

As an opera singer, Fischer-Dieskau performed mainly in Berlin and at the Bavarian State Opera in Munich. He also made guest appearances at the Vienna State Opera, at the Royal Opera House in London, at the Hamburg State Opera, in Japan, and at the King's Theatre in Edinburgh during the Edinburgh Festival. His first tour in the United States took place in 1955, when he was 29, with his concert debut in Cincinnati on 15 April (Bach's cantata Ich will den Kreuzstab gerne tragen), BWV 56, and 16 April (Brahms: Ein Deutsches Requiem). His American Lieder debut, singing Franz Schubert songs, took place in Saint Paul, Minnesota, on 19 April. His New York City debut occurred on 2 May at The Town Hall, where he sang Schubert's song cycle Winterreise without an interval. Both American recitals were accompanied by Gerald Moore.

In 1951, Fischer-Dieskau made his first of many recordings of Lieder with Gerald Moore at Abbey Road Studios in London, including a complete Die schöne Müllerin, and they performed the work on 31 January 1952 at the Kingsway Hall, London, in the Mysore Concerts of the Philharmonia Concert Society. They gave recitals together until Moore retired from public performance in 1967. They continued to record together until 1972, in which year they completed their massive project of recording all of the Schubert lieder appropriate for the male voice. Moore retired completely in 1972, and died in 1987, aged 87. Their recordings of Die schöne Müllerin and Winterreise are highly prized as examples of their artistic partnership.

Fischer-Dieskau also performed many works of contemporary music, including Benjamin Britten (who chose Fischer-Dieskau as the baritone soloist when writing War Requiem), Samuel Barber, Hans Werner Henze, Karl Amadeus Hartmann (who wrote his Gesangsszene for him), Charles Ives, Ernst Krenek, Witold Lutosławski, Siegfried Matthus, Othmar Schoeck, Winfried Zillig, Gottfried von Einem and Aribert Reimann. He participated in the 1975 premiere and 1993 recording of Gottfried von Einem's cantata An die Nachgeborenen, written in 1973 as a commission of the UN, both with Julia Hamari and the Wiener Symphoniker conducted by Carlo Maria Giulini.

Beyond his recordings of Lieder and the German opera repertoire, Fischer-Dieskau also recorded performances in the Italian operatic field. His recordings of Verdi's Rigoletto (alongside Renata Scotto and Carlo Bergonzi) and Rodrigo in Verdi's Don Carlos are probably the most respected of these ventures. (Others, such as the title role in Verdi's Macbeth (with Elena Souliotis), Giorgio Germont in Verdi's La traviata, and Scarpia in Puccini's Tosca (with Birgit Nilsson), are not delivered by him with the same degree of effectiveness.) As conductor Ferenc Fricsay put it, "I never dreamed I'd find an Italian baritone in Berlin."

=== Retirement ===
Fischer-Dieskau retired from opera in 1978, the year he recorded his final opera, Reimann's Lear, which the composer had written at his suggestion. He retired from the concert hall as of New Year's Day, 1993, at age 67, and dedicated himself to conducting, teaching, (especially the interpretation of Lieder), painting and writing books. He still performed as a reciter, reading for example the letters of Strauss to Hugo von Hofmannsthal (whose part was read by Gert Westphal), for the Rheingau Musik Festival in 1994; and both performing and recording Strauss's melodrama Enoch Arden. He also became an honorary member of the Robert Schumann Society.

=== Personal life ===
In 1949, Fischer-Dieskau married the cellist Irmgard Poppen; they had three sons: Mathias (a stage designer), Martin (a conductor), and Manuel (a cellist with the Cherubini Quartet). Irmgard died in 1963 of complications following childbirth. Fischer-Dieskau was later married to the actress Ruth Leuwerik, from 1965 to 1967, and Kristina Pugell, from 1968 to 1975. In 1977 he married the soprano Júlia Várady.

His older brother Klaus Fischer-Dieskau was a Berlin choral director who conducted for Fischer-Dieskau several times, including in his only recording of a passion by Heinrich Schütz in 1961.

Fischer-Dieskau smoked during a large part of his career. In an interview with B.Z.-News aus Berlin in 2002 he said, "I quit smoking 20 years ago. I smoked for 35 years, and then stopped in a single day."

On 18 May 2012, Fischer-Dieskau died in his sleep at his home in Berg, Upper Bavaria, 10 days before his 87th birthday.

== Recognition ==
Throughout his career, his musicianship and technique were frequently described as flawless by critics. As Greg Sandow of Opera News put it, "Overall, his technique is breath-taking; someone should build a monument to it."

As "the world's greatest Lieder singer" (Time magazine), he regularly sold out concert halls all over the world until his retirement at the end of 1992. The precisely articulated accuracy of his performances, in which text and music were presented as equal partners, established standards that endure today. The current widespread interest in German Romantic art song is mainly due to his efforts. Perhaps most admired as a singer of Schubert Lieder, Fischer-Dieskau had, according to critic Joachim Kaiser, only one really serious competitor – himself, as over the decades he set new standards, explored new territories and expressed unanticipated feelings and emotions.

Few artists achieve the level of recognition, admiration and influence of Fischer-Dieskau, and even fewer live to see that influence realised during their own lifetime. Ushering in the modern recording era, he challenged our perception and processes of how recordings could be made, explored the possibilities of modern recording and exploited the potential for the popularity of classical music – and all this while setting standards of artistic achievement, integrity, risk-taking, and of the aesthetic ideal that became our new norm. Whenever we bask in the beauty of his tone, revere the probing, questioning power of his intellect, or simply wonder at the astonishing physical abilities throughout all that he has achieved in his long recording career, we must also pause and say THANK YOU to this great artist, whose legacy, like a great and bright star lighting the way for those who follow in his passion for singing, is exemplary in every way.—Thomas Hampson, May 2012, Hall of Fame, Gramophone Magazine.

After Fischer-Dieskau's death, Le Monde, France's most internationally known newspaper, wrote that Fischer-Dieskau's vocal artistry bordered on a miracle ("cela tenait du miracle"): "As soon as he opened his mouth, they believed every word he sang. Not a single word, not an intention, not a nuance did he pass over in his diction" ("dès qu'il ouvrait la bouche, on y croyait. Pas un mot, pas une intention, pas une nuance n'échappait à sa diction"). In an obituary in The Guardian, pianist and conductor Daniel Barenboim, Fischer-Dieskau's longtime accompanist in lieder, called the baritone a "revolutionary performer" because he was the first singer ever to succeed as a single person in delivering equally extraordinary performances in all three genres: opera, oratorio and lieder:

In his interpretations, he [Fischer-Dieskau] created a unity between text and music unlike few before or after him. He set the benchmark in enunciation, and he emphasised key words through changing the sound of the note on which the word was sung. Thus, he not only clarified the sense of the word, but he let every syllable and every note sound together and thereby created a unity of harmony and colours unlike anyone else. [...] He created a new dimension of the comprehensibility and understandability of the text.

In an interview on the occasion of the centenary of his birth, Christian Gerhaher noted his encyclopedic recording of Lieder, in an intellectual approach that served as a way of positive and strong authenticity after World War II. He described Fischer-Dieskau's voice, especially in early recordings, as relatively dark and velvety, which a natural richness of colours and sound".

== Awards ==
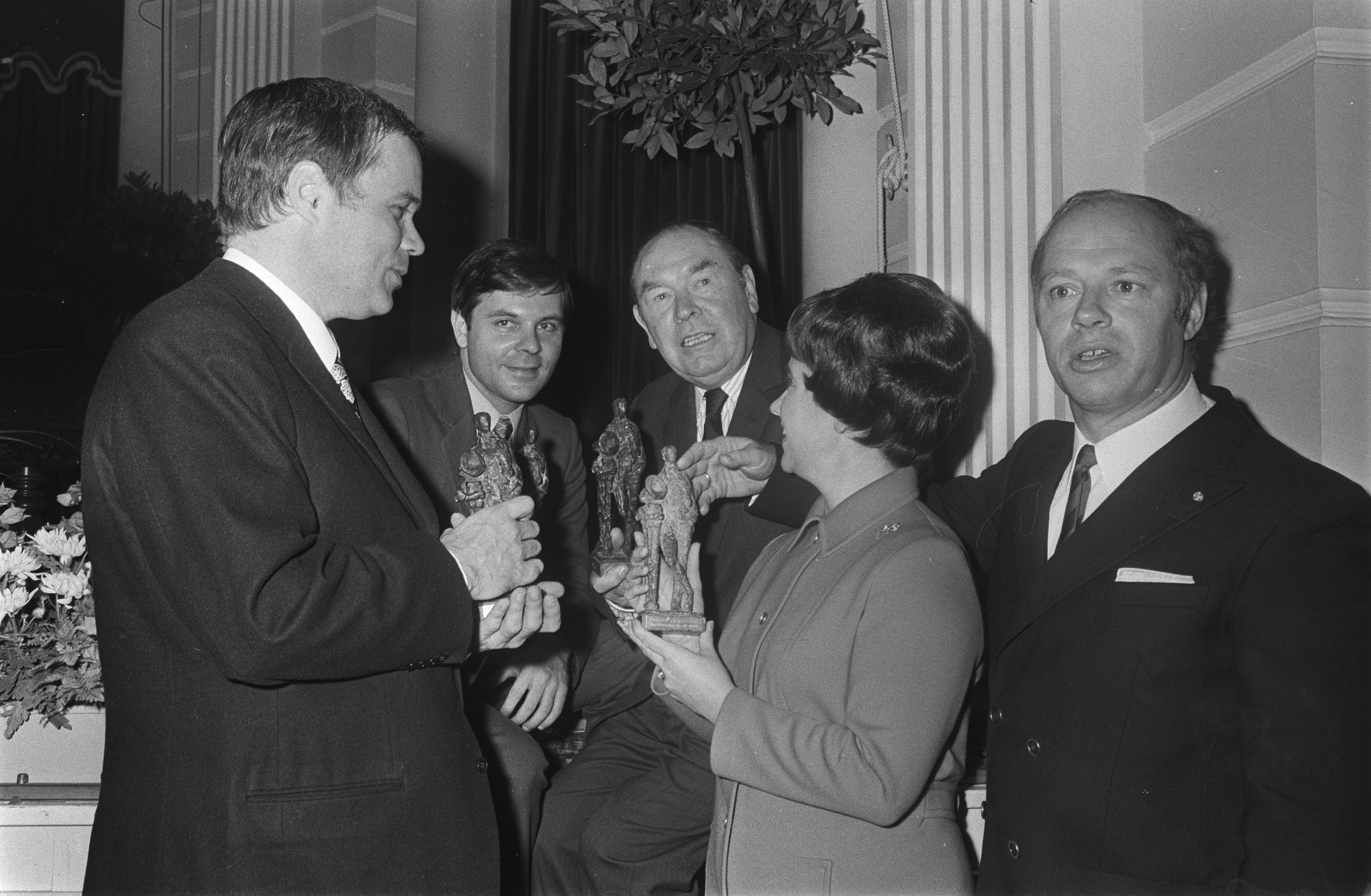
Edisons klassiek, 1970, Amsterdam (l.)

- Léonie Sonning Music Prize 1975
- Ernst von Siemens Music Prize 1980
- Praemium Imperiale 2002
- Polar Music Prize 2005
- Gramophone Hall of Fame entrant 2012
- Chevalier de la Légion d'honneur 1990.
- Won five Grammy Awards: in 1970, 1972, 1977, 1988, and 2000.

== Recordings ==
=== As singer ===
Fischer-Dieskau recorded mainly for the EMI, Deutsche Grammophon, and Orfeo labels.

- J. S. Bach
  - 75 Cantatas with Karl Richter on the Polygram label
  - as Jesus and bass soloists in the Passions with conductors including Herbert von Karajan, Otto Klemperer, Wilhelm Furtwängler, and Fritz Lehmann
  - Christmas Oratorio, with Sir Philip Ledger
- Bartók
  - Bluebeard's Castle, with Ferenc Fricsay
  - Bluebeard's Castle, with his fourth wife Júlia Várady as Judith, conducted by Wolfgang Sawallisch
- Beethoven
  - Fidelio, with Fricsay
  - Fidelio, with Leonard Bernstein
  - Choral Symphony, with Fricsay
- Alban Berg
  - Vier Lieder, Op. 2, with pianist Aribert Reimann
  - Wozzeck, with Karl Böhm
  - Lulu, with Böhm
- Brahms
  - Ein Deutsches Requiem, with Rudolf Kempe
  - Ein Deutsches Requiem, with Klemperer and Elisabeth Schwarzkopf (EMI)
  - Liebeslieder Walzer
  - Vier ernste Gesänge, with pianist Jörg Demus
  - Die schöne Magelone
- Britten, War Requiem, world premiere with Britten conducting, with Galina Vishnevskaya and Peter Pears
- Busoni, Doktor Faust, with Ferdinand Leitner
- Cimarosa, The Secret Marriage, with Daniel Barenboim
- Debussy, Mélodies, with pianist Hartmut Höll
- Fauré, Requiem, with André Cluytens
- Gluck
  - Orfeo ed Euridice, with Richter
  - Orfeo ed Euridice with Fricsay
  - Iphigenie in Aulis, with Artur Rother
  - Iphigenie in Aulis with Kurt Eichhorn and Anna Moffo
  - Iphigénie en Tauride with Lamberto Gardelli
- Haydn
  - Die Schöpfung, with Karajan
  - Die Schöpfung, with Sir Neville Marriner
- Henze, Elegie für junge Liebende, world premiere with the composer conducting
- Hindemith
  - Cardillac, with Joseph Keilberth
  - Mathis der Maler, with Rafael Kubelík
  - When lilacs last in the dooryard bloom'd, with Sawallisch
- Franz Liszt, 44 Lieder, with Barenboim
- Carl Loewe
  - Carl Loewe Ballads and Lieder, with Demus
  - Loewe: Balladen & Lieder, with Höll
- Mahler
  - Das Lied von der Erde with Paul Kletzki and the Philharmonia Orchestra (EMI) (The first recorded version of this work to employ two male singers, as Mahler suggested as an alternative. The tenor was Murray Dickie)
  - Das Lied von der Erde, with Leonard Bernstein and the Vienna Philharmonic (Decca)
  - Lieder, with pianist Barenboim
  - Lieder eines fahrenden Gesellen, Des Knaben Wunderhorn, with Barenboim
  - Lieder eines fahrenden Gesellen, Kindertotenlieder, with Furtwängler and Kempe
  - Kindertotenlieder, with Böhm
  - Rückert-Lieder
- Mendelssohn
  - Lieder, with Höll
  - Paulus Oratorio, with Rafael Frühbeck de Burgos
  - Elijah, with Gwyneth Jones, Janet Baker, Nicolai Gedda and Simon Woolf (The Youth) New Philharmonia Chorus, New Philharmonia Orchestra (1968)
- Mozart
  - Coronation Mass, Vesperae solennes de confessore, with Eugen Jochum

External audio
- Fischer-Dieskau as Papageno with the RIAS Symphony Orchestra conducted by Ferenc Fricsay in 1955 on archive.org

  - Le nozze di Figaro, with Böhm
  - Don Giovanni, with Fricsay (in German)
  - Don Giovanni, with Karl Böhm
  - Così fan tutte, with Böhm
  - Le nozze di Figaro, with Fricsay
  - Die Zauberflöte, with Fricsay
  - Die Zauberflöte, with Karl Böhm
  - Die Zauberflöte, with Georg Solti (as the Sprecher)
  - Requiem, with Barenboim
- Offenbach, Les contes d'Hoffmann
- Orff, Carmina Burana, with Jochum
- Hans Pfitzner
  - Lieder, with Höll
  - Palestrina (as Carlo Borromeo), with Kubelik
- Puccini
  - Tosca
  - Gianni Schicchi, Westdeutscher Rundfunk
- Reger, Hebbel Requiem, with Gerd Albrecht
- Reimann, Lear
- Rossini, Gugliemo Tell, with Mario Rossi
- Othmar Schoeck
  - Lebendig begraben, with Radio-Symphonie-Orchester Berlin
  - Notturno
  - Lieder, with pianists Margrit Weber and Karl Engel
- Schoenberg, selected songs from Opp. 1, 2, 3, 6, 12, 14, and 48, with Aribert Reimann, piano, on the Deutsche Grammophon label
- Schubert
  - Winterreise, with pianist Gerald Moore
  - Winterreise, with Barenboim
  - Winterreise, with Demus
  - Die schöne Müllerin, with Moore
  - Lieder, with Moore
  - Lieder, with Sviatoslav Richter
  - Schwanengesang, with Moore
  - Schwanengesang, a recital from 1948 with pianist Klaus Billing
  - Lieder, with Höll
  - Deutsche Messe, with Wolfgang Sawallisch
  - Missa Solemnis, Mass in C major, Mass in E flat major, with Sawallisch
- Schumann
  - Dichterliebe, Liederkreis, Op, 24, Liederkreis, Op, 39,, and the complete lieder for male voice, with Christoph Eschenbach
  - Liederkreise, with Moore
- Schütz, Matthäuspassion, SWV 479, with Hugo-Distler-Chor conducted by Klaus Fischer-Dieskau
- Shostakovich
  - Suite on Verses of Michelangelo Buonarroti, Four Verses of Captain Lebyadkin, with Vladimir Ashkenazy and the Radio Symphony Orchestra Berlin
  - Symphony No. 14, with Bernard Haitink, Várady and the Concertgebouw Orchestra
- Johann Strauss
  - Der Zigeunerbaron, with Willi Boskovsky
  - Die Fledermaus, with Boskovsky
- Richard Strauss
  - Lieder, with Moore
  - Elektra, with Böhm
  - Salome, with Böhm
  - Arabella, with Sawallisch
  - Die Frau ohne Schatten, with Keilberth
  - Der Rosenkavalier, with Böhm
  - Ariadne auf Naxos, with Kurt Masur
  - Capriccio, with Sawallisch
- Verdi
  - Un ballo in maschera (in German), with Fritz Busch
  - La traviata, with Lorin Maazel
  - Otello with Sir John Barbirolli
  - Falstaff, with Leonard Bernstein
  - Macbeth, with Elena Souliotis
  - Aida, with Barenboim
  - Rigoletto, with Kubelík
  - Don Carlos (in German), with Fricsay (1948, operatic debut)
  - Don Carlos, with Solti
- Wagner
  - Die Meistersinger von Nürnberg, as Hans Sachs, with Jochum
  - Die Meistersinger von Nürnberg, as Fritz Kothner, with André Cluytens
  - Lohengrin, with Rudolf Kempe
  - Der fliegende Holländer, with Franz Konwitschny
  - Tannhäuser, with Otto Gerdes
  - Tannhäuser, with Sawallisch
  - Tannhäuser, with Konwitschny
  - Das Rheingold, with Karajan
  - Götterdämmerung, with Solti
  - Tristan und Isolde, with Furtwängler
  - Tristan und Isolde, with Carlos Kleiber
  - Parsifal, with Hans Knappertsbusch (live at Bayreuth Festival, 1956
  - Parsifal, with Solti
- Weber, Lieder, with Höll
- Webern, selected early Lieder, with Reimann
- Hugo Wolf, Frühe Lieder, with Höll
- Zemlinsky, Lyric Symphony, with Maazel

=== As reciter ===
- Strauss, Enoch Arden, with Burkhard Kehring, piano

=== As conductor ===
- Berlioz: Harold in Italy with violist Josef Suk and the Czech Philharmonic Orchestra on the Supraphon label
- Brahms: Symphony No. 4, with the Czech Philharmonic Orchestra on the Supraphon label
- Mahler: Das Lied von der Erde with the Radio-Sinfonieorchester Stuttgart on the Orfeo label
- Schubert: Symphonies No. 5 and 8 "Unfinished" with the New Philharmonia Orchestra on the EMI label
- Strauss, Arias from Salome, Ariadne auf Naxos, Die Liebe der Danae, and Capriccio, with Várady and the Bamberg Symphony Orchestra on the Orfeo label
- Wagner: Wesendonck Lieder with Várady, Deutschland-Sinfonie-Orchester, Orfeo

=== On video ===
- Schubert, Winterreise, recorded July 1990, with Murray Perahia (piano), from Sony Classical.
- Schubert, Winterreise, recorded January 1979, with Alfred Brendel (piano), Sender Freies Berlin (SFB), from TDK 2005.
- Mozart, Don Giovanni, Deutsche Oper Berlin, with Ferenc Fricsay, live performance in German, recorded 24 September 1961. Cast includes Pilar Lorengar, Elisabeth Grümmer, Walter Berry, Erika Köth, Donald Grobe, and Josef Greindl.
- R. Strauss, Mahler, and Schubert: "Schwarzkopf, Seefried, and Fischer-Dieskau", a DVD from EMI Classics. Includes Schwarzkopf playing the Marschallin and Fischer-Dieskau singing "Erlkönig".
- Mozart, Le nozze di Figaro Vienna Philharmonic Orchestra conducted by Lorin Maazel, from the Salzburg Festival, 1963. A DVD from VAI.
- Mozart, Die Zauberflöte (1971) Hamburg Philharmonic State Orchestra and Chorus of Hamburg State Opera, conducted by Horst Stein, directed by Sir Peter Ustinov. Fischer-Dieskau as the Speaker, with Hans Sotin as Sarastro, Nicolai Gedda as Tamino, Cristina Deutekom as Queen of the Night, Edith Mathis as Pamina, William Workman as Papageno. A DVD from Arthaus Musik GmbH, Leipzig.
- Verdi, Don Carlos, a live performance in German, with Pilar Lorengar, James King, Josef Greindl, and Martti Talvela, conducted by Wolfgang Sawallisch, from the Deutsche Oper, 1965.

== Books ==
- Texte deutscher Lieder. Deutscher Taschenbuchverlag, Munich, 1968.
- Auf den Spuren der Schubert-Lieder. Werden – Wesen – Wirkung. F.A. Brockhaus, Wiesbaden, 1971. (ISBN 3-7653-0248-1) Translated by Kenneth S Whitton as Schubert's Songs: A Biographical Study. Alfred A. Knopf, 1977. (ISBN 0-394-48048-1)
- Wagner und Nietzsche: der Mystagoge und sein Abtrünniger. Deutsche Verlags-Anstalt, Stuttgart, 1974. translated by Joachim Neugroschel as Wagner and Nietzsche. Continuum International, 1976.
- The Fischer-Dieskau Book of Lieder: The Original Texts of over 750 Songs, translated by Richard Stokes and George Bird. Random House, 1977. (ISBN 0-394-49435-0)
- Robert Schumann. Wort und Musik. Das Vokalwerk. Deutsche Verlags-Anstalt, Stuttgart, 1981. translated by Reinhard G. Pauly as Robert Schumann Words and Music: The Vocal Compositions. Hal Leonard, 1992. (ISBN 0-931340-06-3)
- Töne sprechen, Worte klingen: Zur Geschichte und Interpretation des Gesangs. Deutsche Verlags-Anstalt, Stuttgart/Munich, 1985.
- Nachklang. Deutsche Verlags-Anstalt, Stuttgart, 1988. translated by Ruth Hein as Echoes of a Lifetime, Macmillan, London, 1989, and as Reverberations: The Memoirs of Dietrich Fischer-Dieskau. Fromm International, New York, 1989. (ISBN 0-88064-137-1)
- Wenn Musik der Liebe Nahrung ist: Kunstlerschicksale im 19. Jahrhundert. Deutsche Verlags-Anstalt, Stuttgart, 1990.
- Weil nicht alle Blütenträume reifen: Johann Friedrich Reichardt: Hofkapellmeister dreier Preussenkönig. Deutsche Verlags-Anstalt, Stuttgart, 1993.
- Fern die Klage des Fauns. Claude Debussy und seine Welt. Deutsche Verlags-Anstalt, Stuttgart, 1993.
- [Paintings and drawings 1962–1994, a selection]. Nicolaische Verlagsbuchhandlung Beuermann, Berlin, 1994.
- Schubert und seine Lieder. Deutsche Verlags-Anstalt, Stuttgart, 1996.
- Carl Friedrich Zelter und das Berliner Musikleben seiner Zeit. Nicolai Verlag Berlin, 1997.
- Die Welt des Gesangs. J.B. Metzler Verlag, Stuttgart, 1999.
- Zeit eines Lebens – auf Fährtensuche. Deutsche Verlags-Anstalt, Stuttgart, 2000.
- Hugo Wolf. Leben und Werk. Henschel Verlag, Kassel, 2003.
- Musik im Gespräch: Streifzüge durch die Klassik mit Eleonore Büning. List Taschenbuch Verlag, Berlin, 2005.
- Goethe als Intendant: Theaterleidenschaften im klassischen Weimar. Deutscher Taschenbuch Verlag, Stuttgart, 2006.
- Johannes Brahms: Leben und Lieder. List Taschenbuch Verlag, Berlin, 2008.
- Jupiter und ich: Begegnungen mit Furtwängler. Berlin University Press, 2009.
