= Kammerkonzert (Hartmann) =

1935 composition by Karl Amadeus Hartmann

- by Karl Amadeus Hartmann
- Composed: 1930, 1935
- Dedication: Zoltán Kodály
- Movements: 3
- Scoring: clarinet; string quartet; string orchestra

Premiere
- Date: 17 June 1969
- Location: Tonhalle Zürich; Zurich, Switzerland
- Performers: Hans Rudolf Stalder (clarinet); Tonhalle-Orchester Zürich; Rudolf Kempe (conductor)

Kammerkonzert is a chamber concerto for clarinet, string quartet and string orchestra by Karl Amadeus Hartmann, composed in 1930 and 1935.

== History ==
Hartmann studied trombone and composition in Munich from 1924 to 1929 at the Staatliche Akademie der Tonkunst in Munich with Joseph Haas. Beginning in 1928 his works were performed at the opera studio of the Bavarian State Opera and in concerts of the "Juryfreie". Hartmann was inspired by Zoltán Kodály and wrote Kammerkonzert to honour him. He composed in 1930 the movements that would become the second and third. The Nazis banned performances of his works in the beginning 1930s. He withdrew to Kempfenhausen on Lake Starnberg in "inner emigration". He composed the first movement in 1935.

The world premiere was given by clarinetist Hans Rudolf Stalder and the Tonhalle-Orchester Zürich, conducted by Rudolf Kempe, at the Tonhalle Zürich on 17 June 1969. It was first recorded by clarinetist Paul Meyer with the Münchener Kammerorchester conducted by Christoph Poppen.

The autograph score is held by the Bavarian State Library in Munich.

== Music ==
Hartmann scored the work for clarinet, string quartet and string orchestra. Kammerkonzert is structured in three movements.

1. Introduction (Introduktion)
2. Dance-Variation (Tanz-Variation)
3. Fantasia (Fantasie)

Hungarian elements feature in the work, such as lively dance variations in the second movement and free passages reminiscent of "gypsy music" in the third movement. Sound textures in the Introduction are finely woven.

== Recordings ==
Kammerkonzert was first recorded in 1999 and released in 2000, along with the composer's Concerto funebre and Symphony No. 4, by clarinetist Paul Meyer, Conrad Muck and Gernot Süssmuth (violin), Friedemann Weigle (viola), Hans-Jakob Eschenburg (cello), and the Münchener Kammerorchester conducted by Christoph Poppen. A recording was performed by clarinetist Pablo Barragán with the Franz Liszt Chamber Orchestra conducted by István Várdai, together with other works by Hungarian folk music. In a 2019 recording, clarinetist Jean-Luc Votano combined the work with two clarinet works of the 21st century, playing with the Quatuor Danel and the Orchestre Philharmonique de Liège conducted by Christian Arming.
