= Miserae =

Miserae is a symphonic poem by the German composer Karl Amadeus Hartmann.

Composed in 1933–34, it was written in response to the plight of (and dedicated to) those who died in the first Nazi internment camps. As the title suggests (miserae is Latin for 'wretched' or 'miserable') the work reflects not only Hartmann's humanist credentials but his early awareness of what was starting to happen in Germany at the time.

The dedication on the autograph manuscript reads

My friends, who had to die a thousand times over, who sleep for all eternity – we shall not forget you.

The work lasts around fourteen minutes. Cast in four brief sections, the two outer sections are quiet, lyrical passages. The two interior sections are quasi-march pastiches, almost parodying goose-stepping.

It was premiered at the 1935 festival of the International Society for New Music in Prague, where it was chosen as the opening work. The conductor was Hartmann's mentor and champion Hermann Scherchen.

Until 1950, Hartmann used several titles for Miserae, including 'Symphonische Dichtung', Symphony No. 1 and Symphonie Miserae, until he withdrew it. Before then, it had rarely been performed owing to Hartmann's ambivalent attitude towards the relevance of his pre-war works. What had been an earlier Cantata for alto and orchestra ultimately became his First Symphony in 1955.
