= Concerto funebre =

Concerto funebre (Funereal Concerto) is a musical composition for violin soloist and string orchestra by the German composer Karl Amadeus Hartmann. Written in 1939 and substantially revised in 1959, it is by far Hartmann's best known work, especially noted for its lyrical final movement. The title is Italian.

Unlike many of his works, which the composer did not consider completed before they had been substantially reworked as part of an ongoing process after the end of World War II, he completed the Concerto funebre in a relatively short timespan, principally in autumn of 1939. Originally entitled Musik der Trauer (Music of Mourning), he retitled it after only minor revisions in 1959. It is cast in four movements:

1. Introduktion. Largo
2. Adagio
3. Allegro di molto
4. Choral. Langsamer Marsch

The final chorale is based on a popular Russian song Immortal Victims (de:Unsterbliche Opfer) which Hartmann almost certainly learned from his mentor, the conductor Hermann Scherchen, who had heard it while interned in Russia during World War I. Scherchen had published his own translation and arrangement of it in Berlin, for use by the choirs he was then conducting. In Russian it appears to have originated as a song of mourning for the victims of the 1905 Revolution, which explains its appearance in Shostakovich's 11th Symphony, op. 103 (1957), whose subject is the same traumatic episode. It is also likely that Hartmann knew a well-known 78 rpm recording of Unsterbliche Opfer made by the violinist Eduard Sõrmus.

Hartmann said in a letter to Scherchen that the structure of Concerto funebre was designed to reflect:

The intellectual and spiritual hopelessness of the period ... are contrasted with an expression of hope in the two chorales in the beginning and at the end. The opening Chorale is sustained for the most part by the solo voice ...

It was premiered in the Grosser Saal of the Tonhalle at St. Gallen, Switzerland, on 29 February 1940 by the St. Gallen Chamber Orchestra under the direction of Ernst Klug; the soloist was the violinist Karl Neracher. Despite the difficulties of wartime travel, the composer obtained permission to travel from Munich to attend.

Hartmann's revision was first performed at Braunschweig on 12 November 1959, conducted by Heinz Zeebe. The soloist at that performance was Wolfgang Schneiderhan, one of the work's strongest advocates. A later performance survives on record (Orfeo label). The first recording was made by the Swiss violinist Ulrich Lehmann with the Zurich Chamber Orchestra conducted by Edmond de Stoutz (Amadeo label).

The piece bears a dedication, added in 1959, to Hartmann's son, Richard P. Hartmann.
