= Claudia Mahnke =

German operatic mezzo-soprano

- Born: 1967 (age 57–58); Meerane, Saxony, East Germany
- Education: Hochschule für Musik Dresden
- Occupation: Operatic mezzo-soprano
- Organizations: Theater Chemnitz; Staatsoper Stuttgart; Oper Frankfurt
- Awards: Bundeswettbewerb Gesang; Kammersängerin

Claudia Mahnke is a German operatic mezzo-soprano, a member of the Oper Frankfurt, with guest appearances at leading opera houses and the Bayreuth Festival.

== Career ==
Mahnke was born in Meerane in Saxony, Germany. While she attended school she was already taking voice lessons. After the Abitur, she studied voice at the Hochschule für Musik Carl Maria von Weber in Dresden. She made her stage debut in 1991, still during her studies. She was a member of the ensemble of the Theater Chemnitz from 1992 to 1995.

In 1994, Mahnke gained the prize of the Bundeswettbewerb Gesang Berlin in the category opera/operetta/concert. She joined the Staatsoper Stuttgart in 1996. She performed the title role in Karl Amadeus Hartmann's Simplicius Simplicissimus, in a production shown also at the Munich Opera Festival of 2005. The performance earned her several nominations for Singer of the Year of the journal Opernwelt. She was awarded the title Kammersängerin in August 2006.

From the 2006/07 season, she has been a member of the Oper Frankfurt. She appeared as a guest at leading opera houses such as the Komische Oper Berlin, the San Francisco Opera and Opéra National de Lyon. She toured with the ensemble of the Deutsche Oper Berlin to Seoul.

Mahnke made her debut at the Bayreuth Festival in 2013 as Fricka, Waltraute and Second Norne in Wagner's Der Ring des Nibelungen. After repeating these parts the two following years, she appeared as Brangäne in Tristan und Isolde in 2016.

In 2017, she appeared in Frankfurt as Dido in Les Troyens, convincingly interpreting in the final scene of 25 minutes the heroine's progression from hurt vulnerability to furious despair ("alle Stufen der schmerzlichen Verletztheit und der wütenden Verzweiflung").

== Bibliography ==
- Wilhelm Kosch (ed.): Deutsches Theater-Lexikon. Nachtragsband M–Pa. De Gruyter, Berlin. November 2015. p. 16. ISBN 978-3-11-036175-9
