= Klaus Fischer-Dieskau =

Klaus Fischer-Dieskau (Berlin, 2 January 1921 – 19 December 1994) was a German church musician and director of the Berlin Hugo-Distler Choir 1953-1989. He was the older brother of Dietrich Fischer-Dieskau.

The Hugo-Distler Chor Berlin was founded by Klaus Fischer-Dieskau in 1953 and is to be distinguished from the Hugo Distler-Chor Wien, directed by Alois Glassner, and Hugo Distler-Chor Hannover founded by Müller-Scheffsky (1952). He also worked as a recordings producer for Deutsche Grammophon in Berlin.

== Discography ==
- Schutz St Matthew Passion DG Archiv 1961
