= Symphony No. 1 (Hartmann) =

Symphony by Karl Amadeus Hartmann

The First Symphony of the German composer Karl Amadeus Hartmann was completed in 1955.

Subtitled Versuch eines Requiems (Essay Towards a Requiem), the piece began life in 1936 as a cantata for alto solo and orchestra, setting translations of poetry by Walt Whitman. Hartmann appended the title Unser Leben: Symphonisches Fragment (Our Life: Symphonic Fragment) in 1938, intending the piece as a comment on conditions under the Nazi regime. Unsurprisingly it went unperformed during these years, as did the majority of Hartmann's output, and it was not until 1948 that the piece was performed in Frankfurt am Main.

Hartmann revisited the piece in the early 1950s. At this point, his designated First Symphony had been Miserae. However Hartmann withdrew that work, and in 1954-55 after further revision, re-designated this piece as his First Symphony, with its new title Versuch eines Requiem. It was first performed in its final version in Vienna on 22 June 1957 by the Vienna Symphony Orchestra under Nino Sanzogno with soloist Hilde Rössel-Majdan. It is his only numbered symphony to include a vocal part.

== Settings ==
Hartmann did not set complete poems by Whitman, instead opting for extracts. The third movement is purely orchestral.

1. Introduktion: Elend (Introduction: Misery) Text from I Sit and Look Out
2. Frühling (Spring) Text from When Lilacs Last in the Dooryard Bloom'd
3. Thema mit vier Variationen (Theme with four variations)
4. Tränen (Tears) Text from Tears
5. Epilog: Bitte (Epilogue: Supplication) Text from Pensive on her Dead Gazing
