= Simplicius Simplicissimus (opera) =

1935 opera by Karl Amadeus Hartmann and Hermann Scherchen

Des Simplicius Simplicissimus Jugend is a German-language opera by Karl Amadeus Hartmann to a libretto by Hermann Scherchen, Wolfgang Petzet and the composer after Jakob von Grimmelhausen's picaresque novel Simplicius Simplicissimus. Written between 1934 and 1935, it is divided into three acts and more scenes. Hartmann's overture, written to add in 1939, is an homage to composer Sergei Prokofiev. After its 1948 premiere, Hartmann extensively revised it as Simplicius Simplicissimus in 1957.

Like much of Hartmann's work, the opera is a personal protest against Nazi rule. Jewish song motifs fill the overture. Throughout the work, Hartmann alludes to composers of "degenerate music" like Prokofiev, Alban Berg, and Igor Stravinsky by musical quotation. Proclaimed narration echoes Bertolt Brecht's epic theatre. A soprano sings the title role of the Simplicius, a naive shepherd boy. A baritone sings the Einsiedler (Hermit) role.

== Recordings ==
- 1935 original version, Claudia Mahnke, Frank van Aken, Heinz Göhrig, Staatsorchester Stuttgart, conducted by Kwamé Ryan ArtHaus DVD 2008.
- 1948 version, Camilla Nylund, Christian Gerhaher, Will Hartmann, Michael Volle, Die Singphoniker, RO München, Ulf Schirmer BR-Klassik 2008
- 1957 revised version, Helen Donath, Eberhard Büchner, König, Brinkmann, Scholze, Symphonieorchester des Bayerischen Rundfunks, Heinz Fricke 1985 Wergo
- 1957 revised version, Juliane Banse, Peter Marsch, Will Hartmann, Netherlands Radio Choir, Netherlands Philharmonic Orchestra, Markus Stenz Challenge Classics 2013
