= Symphony No. 4 (Hartmann) =

The Fourth Symphony of the German composer Karl Amadeus Hartmann is a work for string orchestra. It was completed in 1946-7.

It was derived in part from an earlier Concerto for strings and soprano written in 1938. Hartmann revised the work to include a new purely instrumental third and closing movement, marked Adagio appassionato. The second movement, Adagio di molto, risoluto, contains several references to Hartmann's own First String Quartet of 1933. A typical performance lasts around 33 minutes.

The work was premiered in this form by the Bavarian Radio Symphony Orchestra under Hans Rosbaud in Munich on 2 April 1948, chronologically before the premiere of his Third Symphony.
