= Hans Rosbaud =

Austrian conductor (1895–1962)

Rosbaud

Hans Rosbaud (22 July 1895 – 29 December 1962) was an Austrian conductor, particularly associated with the music of the twentieth century.

== Biography ==
Hans Rosbaud conducting (photo with dedication from 1959)

Rosbaud was born in Graz. As children, he and his brother Paul Rosbaud performed with their mother, who taught piano. Hans continued studying music at the Hoch Conservatory in Frankfurt, under the tutelage of Bernhard Sekles in composition and Alfred Hoehn in piano.

Rosbaud's first professional post was in Mainz, starting in 1921, as the music director of the city's new School of Music, which included conducting the municipal symphony concerts. He became the first chief conductor of the Hessischer Rundfunk Symphony Orchestra (later the hr-Sinfonieorchester or Frankfurt Radio Symphony) of Frankfurt in 1928. During the 1920s and 1930s, he presented premieres of works by Arnold Schoenberg and Béla Bartók. During the Nazi era, his freedom to present new music was restricted. In 1937, he became the general music director of the city of Münster. In 1941, Rosbaud took the same position in Strasbourg, heading the Orchestre philharmonique. During the war years Rosbaud deliberately kept a low profile, avoiding making any political statements. This was with good reason: his brother Paul was a spy for the Allies, helping them stay informed, amongst other things, about the Nazi progress towards developing an atomic bomb.

In 1945 he was named music director of the Munich Philharmonic by United States occupation authorities. In 1948, Rosbaud's contract with the Munich orchestra was allowed to lapse because the city authorities wanted to move the orchestra's repertoire in a conservative direction. That year Rosbaud became the first chief conductor of the South West German Radio Orchestra in Baden-Baden, where he remained for the rest of his life. In 1954, he conducted the first performance of Schoenberg's opera Moses und Aron at 8 days' notice; this performance was issued on a 1957 commercial recording for Philips. He regularly took the SWR Symphony Orchestra to festivals of contemporary music, such as at Donaueschingen. On 6–8 December 1962, he concluded a six-week residency with the Chicago Symphony Orchestra, leading Schumann's Piano Concerto with Eugene Istomin and Mahler's Ninth Symphony. He died less than a month later in Lugano, Switzerland on 29 December.

== Acclaim ==
Gramophone recently remarked that Rosbaud "was one of the unsung heroes of mid-20th-century music, who ... gave thoroughly rehearsed and assimilated performances and premieres of the widest possible range of music". In Fanfare, Peter J. Rabinowitz pointed to range of his sympathies, claiming it was "greater than that of just about any of his contemporaries except perhaps Bernstein, Scherchen, and Stokowski. Rosbaud is best remembered, probably, for his Mahler, his Bruckner, his work with the Second Vienna School ... and especially his commitment to the post-war avant-garde. But he was a world-class Mozartian, too (his Aix-en-Provence Mozart operas from the 1950s hold up far better today than the better-known Busch recordings from Glyndebourne)—and he championed earlier music as well (he recorded Gluck’s Orfeo ed Euridice and Rameau’s Platée). What’s more striking is that he was able to give his performances of each of these composers an entirely different signature." Rosbaud was a highly cultured man, widely read and varied in his intellectual interests. Putting himself at the service of music he chose to perform, he commanded the respect of numerous notable composers of the 20th century. Prominent in his legacy are recordings of the music of Bruckner, Mahler, Stravinsky and Boulez. A tireless advocate of new music, he was closely associated with Karl Amadeus Hartmann, conducting premiere performances of Hartmann's opera Simplicius Simplicissimus and his Second and Fourth Symphonies, amongst others.

Rosbaud mastered five different musical instruments, from various sections of the orchestra. His favorite pastimes consisted of reading world literature in its original languages (ancient and modern), and studying scientific journals.

Cultural offices
Preceded by none	Chief Conductor, Southwest German Radio Symphony Orchestra; 1948–1962	Succeeded by Ernest Bour
