= Pablo Barragán =

Spanish clarinetist (born 1987)

- Born: 1987 (age 38–39); Marchena, Andalusia, Spain
- Education: Conservatorio de Sevilla; Basel Music Academy
- Occupation: Clarinetist
- Website: www.pablobarragan.es

Pablo Barragán (born 1987) is a Spanish clarinetist. He began his career as a member of the West–Eastern Divan Orchestra, and then made an international career as a soloist, especially as a chamber musician. His recordings include the clarinet sonatas and Clarinet Trio by Johannes Brahms, and chamber music of the 20th century including Karl Amadeus Hartmann's Kammerkonzert for clarinet, string quartet and string orchestra.

== Life and career ==
Barragán was born in Marchena. As a child, he wanted to be a jazz saxophonist, but was more attracted to the timbre of the clarinet because he thought it resembled the human voice. At an early age, he was exposed to the swing music of clarinetist Benny Goodman and a jazz festival that visited his home town in Andalusia in the 1990s. Barragán went on to study clarinet at the Conservatorio Superior de Música Manuel Castillo in Sevilla with Antonio Salguero and at the Barenboim-Said Foundation's Seville Academy with Matthias Glander. He studied further at the Basel Music Academy from 2009, with François Benda. He took master classes with Dimitri Ashkenazy, Martin Fröst and Charles Neidich. Barragán has taught as professor at the Barenboim-Said Academy in Seville from 2020; he has held master classes including at the Reina Sofía School of Music in Madrid.

Barragán was a member of the Barenboim-Said Foundation's West–Eastern Divan Orchestra from 2007. He has played as a soloist with orchestras including the Bratislava Sinfonietta, the Málaga Philharmonic, RTVE Symphony Orchestra in Madrid and the Slovak Philharmonic. He has worked with conductors including Zsolt Hamar. He has played at European festivals including Davos Festival, Menuhin Festival Gstaad, Kronberg Festival, Festspiele Mecklenburg-Vorpommern, Rheingau Musik Festival, Schleswig-Holstein Musik Festival and Young Euro Classic in Berlin and at venues including the Casals Forum, Laeiszhalle in Hamburg, and the Tonhalle Zurich. He played Carl Nielsen's Clarinet Concerto with the Barcelona Symphony Orchestra conducted by Anja Bihlmaier in 2021. He performed the concerto again with the Bruckner Orchestra Linz, conducted by Thomas Dausgaard, in 2023.

Barragán's chamber music partners have included violinist Liza Ferschtman, cellist Kian Soltani, pianists Elena Bashkirova and Beatrice Rana, flutist Emmanuel Pahud and the Modigliani Quartet. He made his debut at the Lucerne Festival in 2013, playing Prokofiev's Violin Sonata No. 2 in an arrangement for clarinet, Debussy's Rhapsodie in a clarinet version, and Jörg Widmann's Fantasie for solo clarinet. After playing the Brahms Clarinet Quintet in a 2023 concert with the Schumann Quartet at London's Wigmore Hall, a reviewer noted that they began playing "poised and searching", with the clarinet as "first among equals", then expressed "sweet melancholy and resurgent passion" in the slow movement and "all the complexity of a human being's warring passions" in the final movement, in a "fully involving performance". Barragán played Messiaen's Quatuor pour la fin du temps with the Sitkovetsky Trio at the Kölner Philharmonie in 2023.

== Recordings ==
Barragán recorded the Clarinet Sonatas and the Clarinet Trio by Johannes Brahms in 2018 with pianist Juan Pérez Floristán and cellist Andrei Ioniță. He recorded chamber music of the 20th century in 2024 with violinist Noa Wildschut and pianist Frank Dupree, including Paul Schoenfield's trio Refractions and Claude Vivier's Pièce for violin and clarinet.Barragán was the clarinet soloist for a CD entitled Szinergia, playing with the Franz Liszt Chamber Orchestra and the Sárközy Trio music related to Hungarian folk music, including Karl Amadeus Hartmann's Kammerkonzert for clarinet, string quartet and string orchestra, and Bartók's Romanian Folk Dances in an arrangement for clarinet, cimbalom and strings, written by Jonas Dominique for Fröst. A reviewer from the Online Merker noted that Barragán traced the secrets and ruptures of Hartmann's work with "incredibly differentiated clarinet playing".

== Awards ==
- 2011: Special prize of the European Music Competitions for Youth (EMCY)
- 2011: First prize of Juventudes Musicales de España
- 2012: Special prize of ARD International Music Competition
- 2013: Prix Credit Suisse Jeunes Solistes
