= Frankfurt Radio Symphony =

German symphony orchestra

hr-Sinfonieorchester
- Radio orchestra
- Former name: Frankfurter Rundfunk-Symphonie-Orchester; Sinfonie-Orchester des Hessischen Rundfunks; Radio-Sinfonie-Orchester Frankfurt
- Founded: 1929; 97 years ago
- Location: Frankfurt am Main
- Concert hall: Alte Oper and hr-Sendesaal
- Concertmaster: Ulrich Edelmann
- Music director: Alain Altinoglu
- Website: www.hr-sinfonieorchester.de

YouTube information
- Channel: hr-Sinfonieorchester – Frankfurt Radio Symphony
- Years active: 2011–present
- Genre: Classical music
- Subscribers: 661 thousand
- Views: 296 million
- Last updated: 23 August 2026

The Frankfurt Radio Symphony (German: hr-Sinfonieorchester) is the radio orchestra of Hessischer Rundfunk, the public broadcasting network of the German state of Hesse. Venues are Alte Oper and hr-Sendesaal. The music director is the French conductor Alain Altinoglu. Chief conductors have brought in Russian, Nordic and French influences. The orchestra has been one of the leading Mahler and Bruckner orchestras internationally. The hr-Sinfonieorchester with 108 musicians is the third oldest in the ARD.

== History ==
=== Names ===
From 1929 to 1950 the orchestra was named Frankfurter Rundfunk-Symphonie-Orchester. From 1950 to 1971 the orchestra was named Sinfonie-Orchester des Hessischen Rundfunks, from then to 2005 Radio-Sinfonie-Orchester Frankfurt. Frankfurt Radio Symphony is used for international tours (First tour: United States 1980, Japan 1987, China 2003).

=== Founding and early years ===
Richard Wagner: "Titurel, der fromme Held" from Parsifal, excerpt from a 1942 recording under the direction of Otto Frickhoeffer (Hellmut Schwebs as Gurnemanz)

The orchestra was founded in 1929. Hans Rosbaud, its first conductor, put his stamp on the orchestra's orientation up to the year 1937 by focusing not only on traditional music but also contemporary compositions. Alban Berg, Arnold Schoenberg, Béla Bartók, Igor Stravinsky, Anton Webern and Paul Hindemith participated in the Radio Frankfurt concerts. Schoenberg wrote radio lectures for Radio Frankfurt.

In 1937, Otto Frickhoeffer was sent by the NSDAP. He performed only German music.

Georges Bizet: L'Arlesienne, suite No. 1, first movement, excerpt from a 1948 recording under the direction of Kurt Schröder

Johannes Brahms: Tragic Overture, excerpt from a 1968 recording under the direction of Dean Dixon

After World War II, Kurt Schröder and Winfried Zillig committed themselves to rebuilding the orchestra and a broad musical repertoire. The venue hr-Sendesaal was ready for use in 1954. In the opening ceremony, Karl Böhm conducted Beethoven's Symphony No. 9.

=== Dean Dixon and Eliahu Inbal ===
Gustav Mahler: Symphony No. 1, second movement excerpt from a 1995 recording under the direction of Eliahu Inbal

Dean Dixon and Eliahu Inbal turned the ensemble into an internationally acclaimed orchestra in the three decades from 1961 to 1990. Dixon's repertoire included Hans Werner Henze, Karl Amadeus Hartmann, Carl Nielsen, Franz Berwald and Charles Ives. The status of the orchestra has been repeatedly confirmed, especially during the "Inbal Era", with guest appearances around the world and major editions of recorded music, such as the very first recordings of the original versions of Anton Bruckner symphonies (Symphony 3/4/8, Deutscher Schallplattenpreis, 1983) and the first digital recording of all of Gustav Mahler's symphonies (Deutscher Schallplattenpreis, 1988). Inbal, who was chief conductor from 1974 to 1990, has been elected its conductor laureate since 1996. The venue Alte Oper was reopened in 1981.

=== Dmitri Kitajenko and Hugh Wolff ===
Richard Strauss: Don Juan, excerpt from a 1992 recording under the direction of Dmitri Kitajenko

From 1990 to 1996, Dmitri Kitajenko was chief conductor of the Frankfurt Radio Symphony. His work focused on the German and Russian traditions, as well as modern styles. His recordings include orchestral works by Scriabin and the piano concertos by Prokofiev.

Hector Berlioz: Symphonie fantastique, second movement excerpt from a 2000 recording under the direction of Hugh Wolff

The American conductor Hugh Wolff was chief conductor of the Frankfurt Radio Symphony Orchestra from 1997 to 2006. He experimented with historical performance practice.

=== Paavo Järvi ===
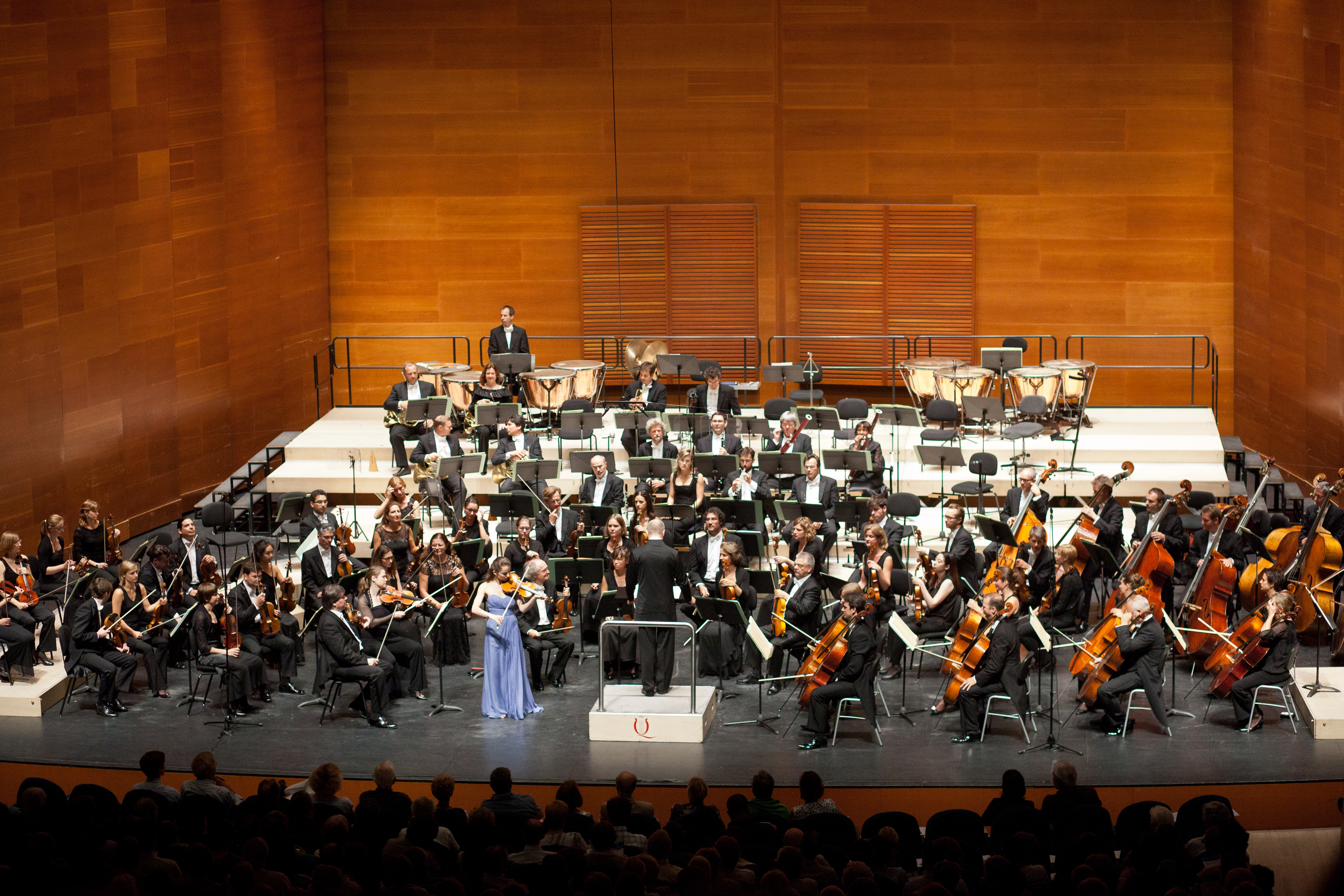
Performance under the direction of Paavo Järvi with Alina Pogostkina in the San Sebastián Kursaal 2013

Anton Bruckner: Symphony No. 3, third movement, excerpt from a 2006 recording under the direction of Paavo Järvi

The Estonian Paavo Järvi held the position of music director for the Frankfurt Radio Symphony from 2006 to 2013 and assumed the position of conductor laureate at the beginning of the 2013–2014 season. Järvi enriched the orchestra with new musical aspects through his commitment to Nordic repertoire. For example, the music of Jean Sibelius, Eduard Tubin, Arvo Pärt and Erkki-Sven Tüür. He made complete recordings of Bruckner's and Nielsen's symphonies. In 2012, an own YouTube channel was established.

=== Andrés Orozco-Estrada ===
Antonín Dvořák: Symphony No. 9, first movement, excerpt from a 2018 recording under the direction of Andrés Orozco-Estrada

Colombian conductor Andrés Orozco-Estrada became the orchestra's music director in 2014. Orozco-Estrada made a number of recordings for the Pentatone label. A key focus of Orozco-Estrada's tenure was on Viennese Classicism and Romanticism.

=== Alain Altinoglu ===
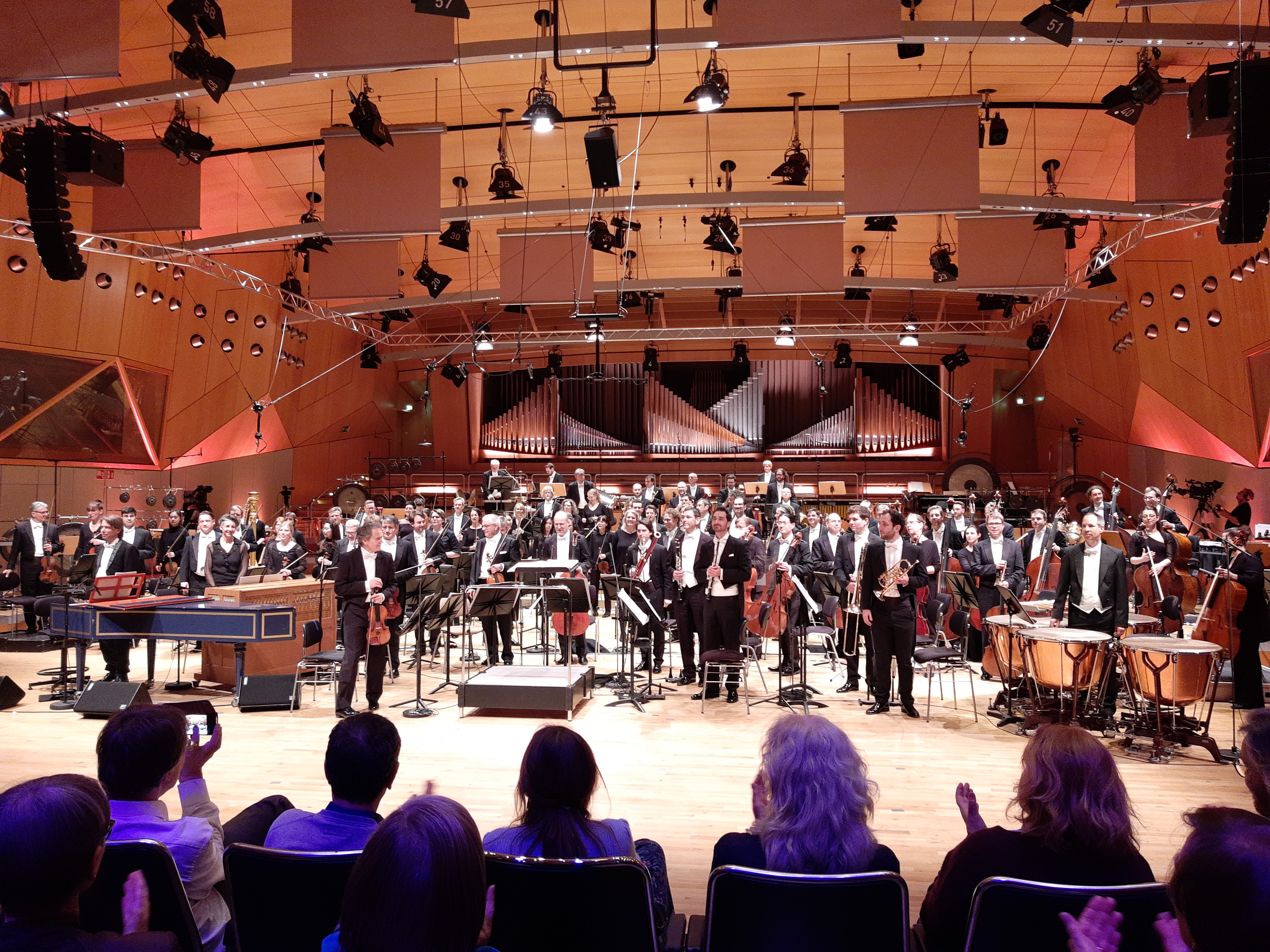
Frankfurt Radio Symphony at hr-Sendesaal 2023

In December 2019, the orchestra announced the appointment of Alain Altinoglu as its next chief conductor, effective with the 2021–2022 season, with an initial contract of three years. In May 2023, the Hessischer Rundfunk announced an extension of Altinoglu's contract as the orchestra's chief conductor through the 2027–2028 season. Altinoglu's first years were accentuated by his commitment for French repertoire. Program focus of the 2023–2024 season was Nature & Earth. As of 2024, a Shostakovich cycle is ongoing. In November 2024, the orchestra's YouTube channel reached 500,000 subscribers.

== Engagements ==
=== Europa Open Air ===
In August, the traditional season opening of the hr-Sinfonieorchester together with the European Central Bank is the Europa Open Air concert at the riverbank of the Main. The 2023 concert with 16,500 visitors was the fifth Europa Open Air. ARD was the broadcaster of the concert.

=== Rheingau Musik Festival ===
The Rheingau Musik Festival is traditionally opened in Eberbach Abbey by a concert of the hr-Sinfonieorchester, radio broadcast live.

== Repertoire ==
The orchestra's range of musical styles includes the classical-romantic repertoire and premieres of contemporary classical music ("Große Reihe", formerly hr-Sinfoniekonzerte), Baroque ("Barock+") and contemporary, experimental music ("Forum N").

Once a year the Music Discovery Project, the encounter between different musical worlds classical, pop and electronics, takes place.

== Venues ==
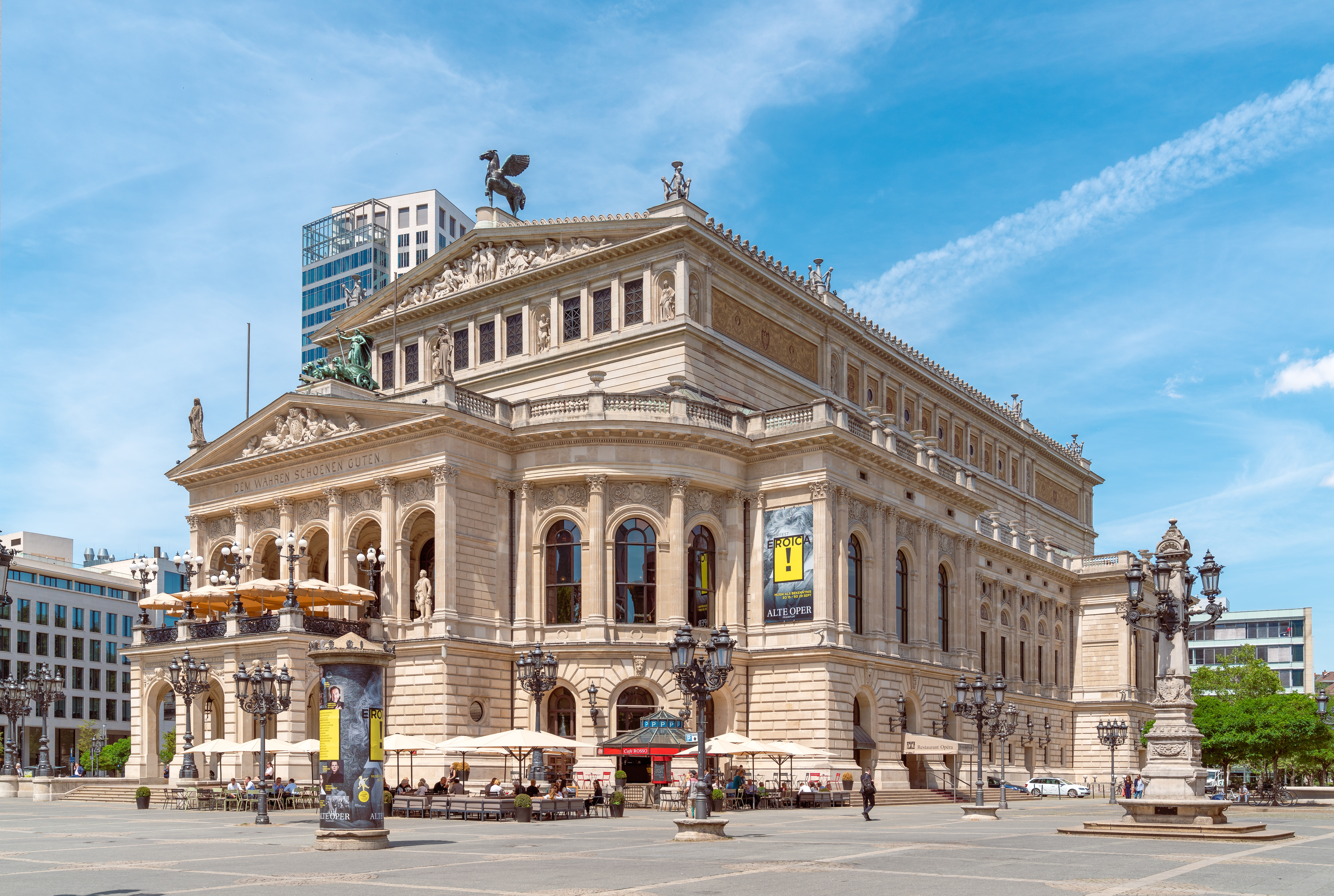
Alte Oper

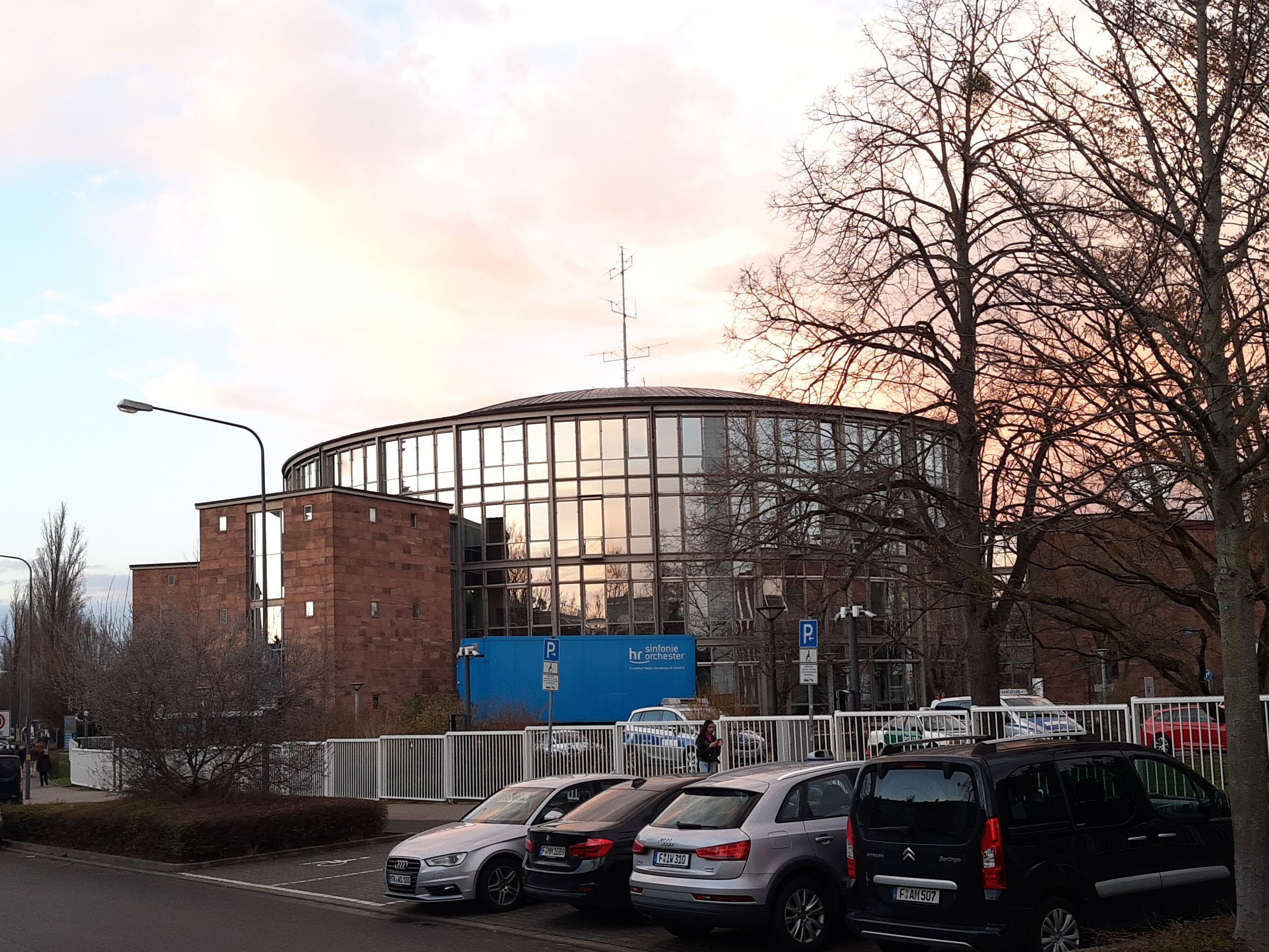
hr-Sendesaal

== Principal conductors ==
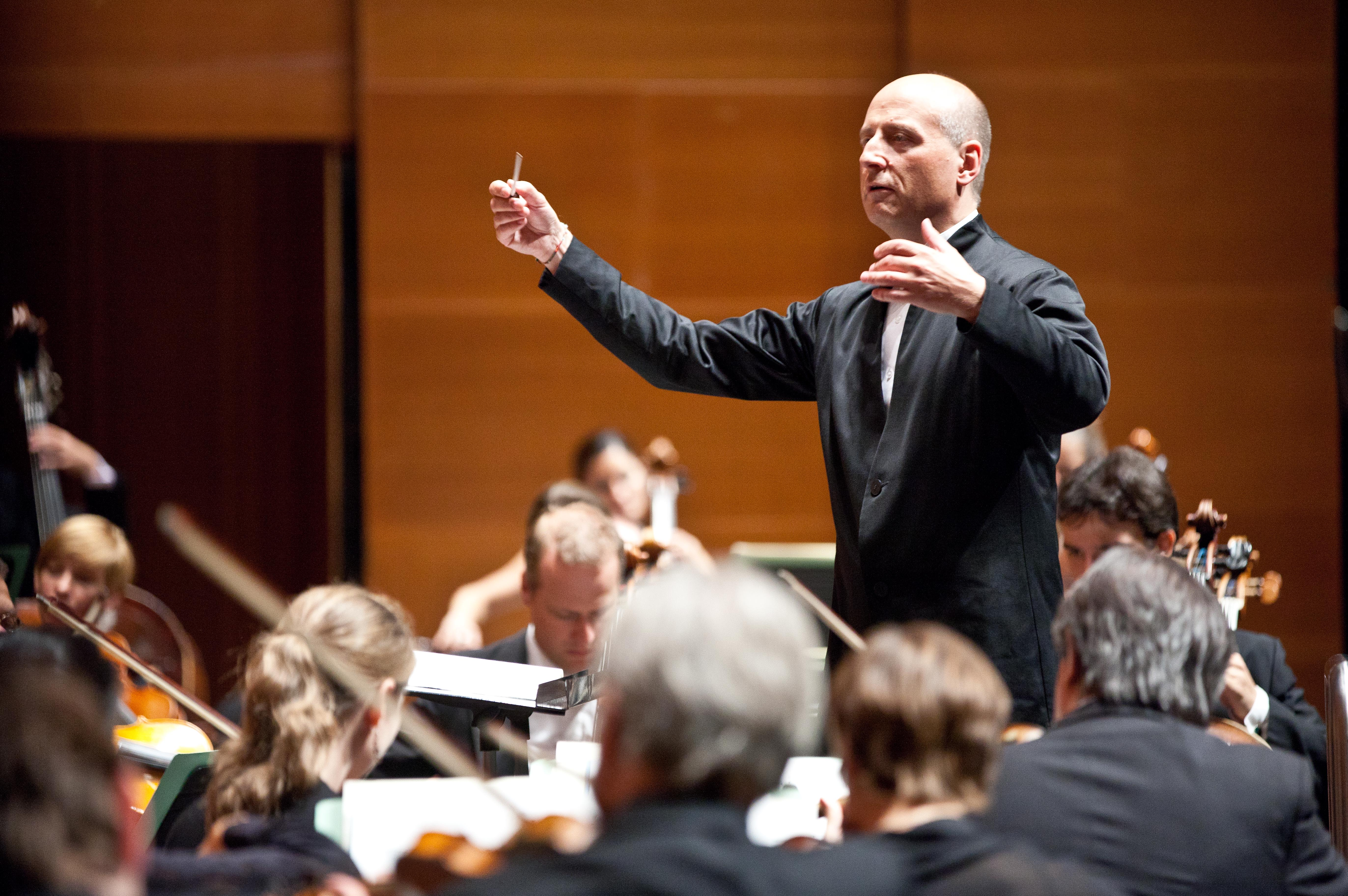
Paavo Järvi with hr-Sinfonieorchester 2013

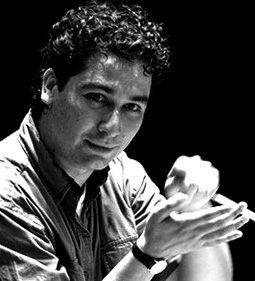
Andres Orozco Estrada

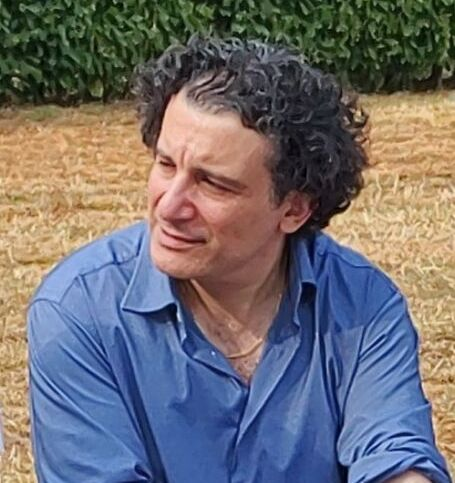
Alain Altinoglu

- 1929–1937 Hans Rosbaud
- 1937–1945 Otto Frickhoeffer
- 1946–1953 Kurt Schröder
- 1955–1961 Otto Matzerath
- 1961–1974 Dean Dixon
- 1974–1990 Eliahu Inbal
- 1990–1997 Dmitri Kitajenko
- 1997–2006 Hugh Wolff
- 2006–2013 Paavo Järvi
- 2014–2021 Andrés Orozco-Estrada
- 2021–present Alain Altinoglu

=== Conductors laureate ===
- Eliahu Inbal
- Paavo Järvi

== Notable guest conductors ==
- Hermann Scherchen (1950–1960)
- Paul Hindemith (1960)
- Pierre Boulez (1964)
- Michael Gielen (1968)
- Karlheinz Stockhausen (1993)
- Luciano Berio (1996–1997)

== Artists in Residence ==
- 1994 Pinchas Zukerman
- 2007/08 Christine Schäfer
- 2008/09 Christian Tetzlaff
- 2009/10 Matthias Goerne
- 2010/11 Janine Jansen
- 2011/12 Alisa Weilerstein
- 2012/13 Fazıl Say
- 2013/14 Christiane Karg
- 2014/15 Patricia Kopatchinskaja
- 2015/16 Martin Grubinger
- 2016/17 François Leleux
- 2017/18 Antoine Tamestit
- 2018/19 Martin Fröst
- 2019/20 Iveta Apkalna
- 2020/21 Pekka Kuusisto
- 2020/21 Bryce Dessner, Composer in Residence
- 2021/22 Víkingur Ólafsson
- 2022/23 Emmanuel Tjeknavorian
- 2023/24 Trumpet in Residence
- 2024/25 Thierry Escaich, Composer in Residence (Te Deum for Notre-Dame de Paris)
- 2025/26 Lucas and Arthur Jussen
- 2026/27 Kirill Gerstein

== Notable musicians ==
- Jean Kurt Forest
- Reinhold Friedrich
- Ingo Goritzki
- Volker David Kirchner
- Fumiaki Miyamoto
- Marie-Luise Neunecker
- Abel Pereira
- Alfred Sous
- Helmut Winschermann

== Notable premieres ==
In 1928, before the official foundation of the orchestra, Hindemith's Kammermusik Nr. 7 Op. 46, No. 2 was premiered, followed by Schoenberg's Four Orchestral Songs, Op. 22 in 1932. In 1933, Bartók's Piano Concerto No. 2 premiered, with the composer as soloist.

== Awards ==
- 2025 Hessian Cultural Prize

== Discography ==
- Strauss, Richard; Orozco-Estrada, Andrés; Magee, Emily; Bronder, Peter; Schuster, Michaela; Koch, Wolfgang; Bruns, Benjamin; Eichenberger, Claude; hr-Sinfonieorchester (2017), Salome : musical drama in one act (in German), [Baarn]: Pentatone, OCLC 1312711943
- Strauss, Richard; Naxos Digital Services US (2016), Strauss, R.: Heldenleben (Ein) / Macbeth (Frankfurt Radio Symphony, Orozco-Estrada), Hong Kong: Naxos Digital Services US Inc, OCLC 8051046524
- Stravinsky, Igor; Naxos Digital Services US (2016), Stravinsky, I.: Rite Of Spring (The)/ The Firebird Suite (1919 Version)(Frankfurt Radio Symphony, Orozco-Estrada), Hong Kong: Naxos Digital Services US Inc, OCLC 950998238
- Saint-Saëns, Camille; Inbal, Eliahu; Radio-Sinfonie-Orchester Frankfurt (2005), Symphony no. 1 in E-flat, op. 2; Symphony no. 2 in A minor, op. 55 (in no linguistic content), [Netherlands]: PentaTone, OCLC 62586658
- Holliger, Heinz; Nicolet, Aurèle; Inbal, Eliahu; Bellini, Vincenzo; Molique, Bernhard; Moscheles, Ignaz; Rietz, Julius; Vivaldi, Antonio; Radio-Sinfonie-Orchester Frankfurt; I Musici (2004), Works for oboe and flute (in no linguistic content), [Baarn, Netherlands]: PentaTone Classics, OCLC 76814383
- Rachmaninoff, Sergei; Haas, Werner; Inbal, Eliahu; Paganini, Nicolò; Radio-Sinfonie-Orchester Frankfurt (2003), Piano concerto no. 2; Rhapsody on a theme by Paganini (in no linguistic content), [Netherlands]: PentaTone, OCLC 54111448
- Petersen, Wilhelm; Trinks, Constantin; hr-Sinfonieorchester (2022), Symphony no. 3 op. 30 (in no linguistic content), Neuhausen: Profil, OCLC 1378515873 (Opus Klassik 2023)
- Franck, César; Altinoglu, Alain; hr-Sinfonieorchester (2022), Symphony in D minor; Rédemption; Le chasseur maudit (in no linguistic content), France: Alpha, OCLC 1365622520
- Schmitt, Florent; Braid, Ambur; Staemmler, Philipp; Altinoglu, Alain; hr-Sinfonieorchester (2024), La tragédie de Salomé (in undetermined language), [France]: Alpha classics. Outhere music France, OCLC 1454702431

== See also ==
- Radio orchestra
- Category:Music commissioned by the Frankfurt Radio Symphony (2)
- hr-Bigband
