= Heinz Zeebe =

German conductor

Heinz Zeebe (27 November 1915 – 17 April 1983) was a German conductor. The Paul Hindemith student was First Kapellmeister at the Staatstheater Braunschweig from 1946 to 1981.

== Life ==
Born in Berflin, Zeebe studied at the Staatliche Akademische Musikhochschule Berlin-Charlottenburg from 1935. His teacher in composition was Paul Hindemith. Through the mediation of the conductor Carl Schuricht, Zeebe obtained a position as répétiteur and conductor at the Saarländisches Staatstheater in Saarbrücken in 1939.

=== Activity in Braunschweig ===
Zeebe came to Braunschweig during the war, became a soldier in 1941 and was taken prisoner. In 1946, under general music director Albert Bittner he was appointed First Kapellmeister at the State Theatre. In 1949, with the support of the city of Braunschweig, he initiated the Festive Days of New Chamber Music, which he directed until 1982. Together with his father-in-law, the chief city director Erich Walter Lotz, Zeebe was co-initiator of the Louis Spohr Musikpreis Braunschweig awarded by the city of Braunschweig. In 1973, he himself received this prize. Zeebe died on 17 April 1983 in Braunschweig at the age of 67.
