= Karl Amadeus Hartmann =

German composer

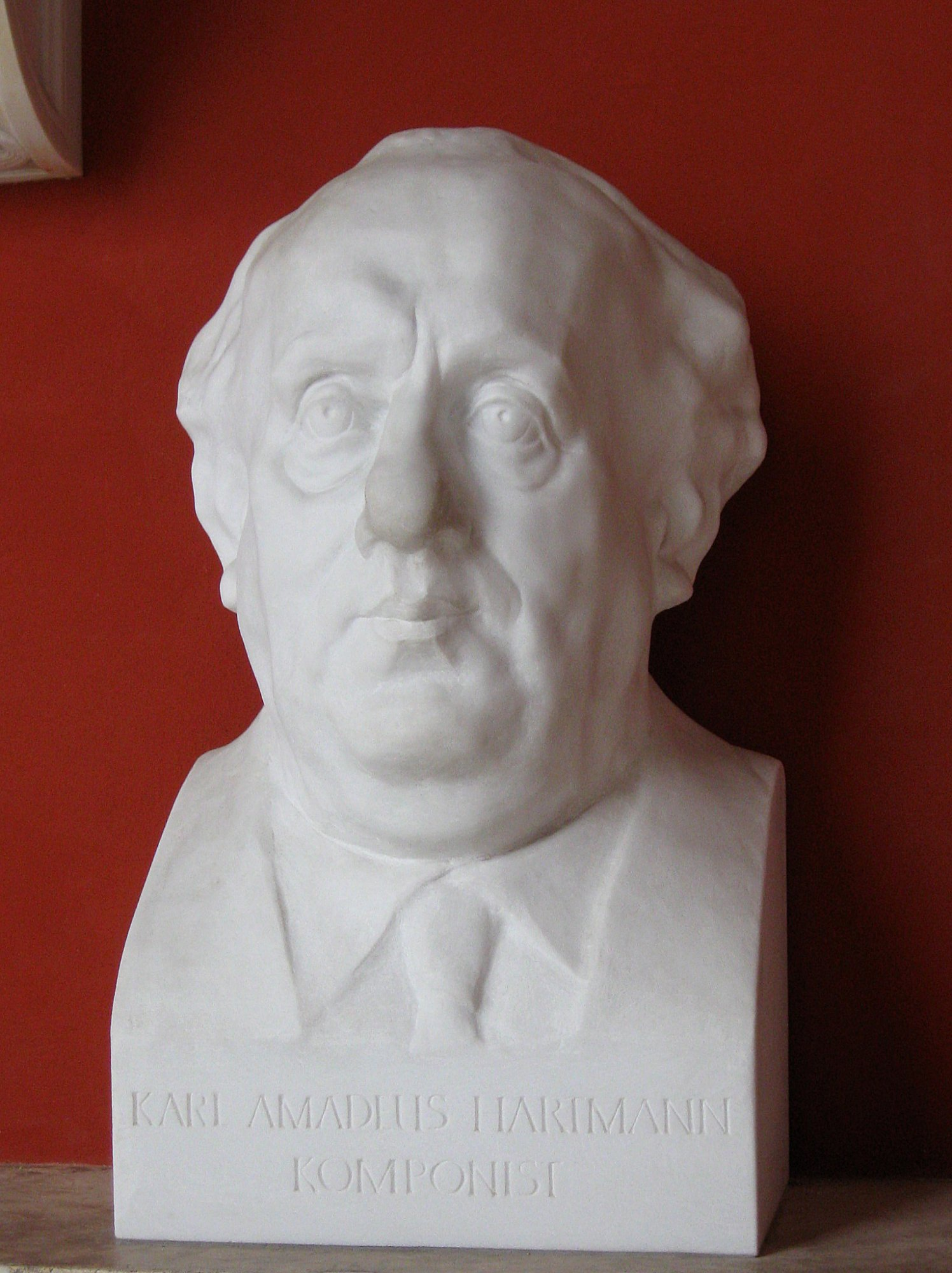
- Bust of Hartmann in Munich
- Born: 2 August 1905; Munich, Kingdom of Bavaria, German Empire
- Died: 5 December 1963 (aged 58); Munich, Bavaria, Germany
- Education: Munich Academy
- Occupation: Classical composer

Karl Amadeus Hartmann (2 August 1905 – 5 December 1963) was a German composer. A major figure of the musical life of post-war Germany, he has been described as the greatest German symphonist of the 20th century.

== Life ==
Born in Munich, the son of Friedrich Richard Hartmann, and the youngest of four brothers of whom the elder three became painters, Hartmann was himself torn, early in his career, between music and the visual arts. He was much affected in his early political development by the events of the unsuccessful Workers’ Revolution in Bavaria that followed the collapse of the German empire at the end of World War I (see Bavarian Soviet Republic). He remained an idealistic socialist for the rest of his life.

At the Munich Academy in the 1920s, Hartmann studied with Joseph Haas, a pupil of Max Reger, and later received intellectual stimulus and encouragement from the conductor Hermann Scherchen, an ally of the Schoenberg school, with whom he had a nearly lifelong mentor-protégé relationship. He voluntarily withdrew completely from musical life in Germany during the Nazi era, while remaining in Germany, and refused to allow his works to be played there. An early symphonic poem, Miserae (1933–1934, first performed in Prague, 1935) was condemned by the Nazi regime but his work continued to be performed, and his fame grew, abroad. A number of Hartmann's compositions show the profound effect of the political climate. His Miserae (1933–34) was dedicated to his 'friends...who sleep for all eternity; we do not forget you (Dachau, 1933–34)', referring to Dachau Concentration Camp, and was condemned by the Nazis. His piano sonata 27 April 1945 portrays 20,000 prisoners from Dachau whom Hartmann witnessed being led away from Allied forces at the end of the war.

During World War II, though already an experienced composer, Hartmann submitted to a course of private tuition in Vienna by Schoenberg’s pupil Anton Webern (with whom he often disagreed on a personal and political level). Although stylistically their music had little in common, he clearly felt that he needed, and benefited from, Webern's acute perfectionism.

After the fall of Adolf Hitler, Hartmann was one of the few prominent surviving anti-fascists in Bavaria whom the postwar Allied administration could appoint to a position of responsibility. In 1945, he became a dramaturge at the Bavarian State Opera and there, as one of the few internationally recognized figures who had survived untainted by any collaboration with the Nazi regime, he became a vital figure in the rebuilding of (West) German musical life. Perhaps his most notable achievement was the Musica Viva concert series, which he founded and ran for the rest of his life in Munich. Beginning in November 1945, the concerts reintroduced the German public to 20th-century repertoire, which had been banned since 1933 under National Socialist aesthetic policy. Hartmann also provided a platform for the music of young composers in the late 1940s and early 1950s, helping to establish such figures as Hans Werner Henze, Luigi Nono, Luigi Dallapiccola, Carl Orff, Iannis Xenakis, Olivier Messiaen, Luciano Berio, Bernd Alois Zimmermann and many others. Hartmann also involved sculptors and artists such as Jean Cocteau, Le Corbusier, and Joan Miró in exhibitions at Musica Viva.

He was accorded numerous honours after the war, including the Musikpreis of the city of Munich in March 1949. This was followed by the Kunstpreis of the Bayerische Akademie der Schönen Künste (1950), the Arnold Schönberg Medal of the IGNM (1954), the Große Kunstpreis of the Land Nordrhein-Westfalen (1957), as well as the Ludwig Spohr Award of the city of Braunschweig, the Schwabing Kunstpreis (1961) and the Bavarian Medal of Merit (1959). Hartmann became a member of the Academy of Arts in Munich (1952) and Berlin (1955) and received an honorary doctorate from Spokane Conservatory, Washington (1962). His socialist sympathies did not extend to the Soviet Union's variety of communism, and in the 1950s, he refused an offer to move to East Germany.

Hartmann continued to base his activities in Munich for the remainder of his life, and his administrative duties came to absorb much of his time and energy. This reduced his time for composition, and his last years were dogged by serious illness. In 1963, he died of stomach cancer at the age of 58, leaving his last work – an extended symphonic Gesangsszene for voice and orchestra on words from Jean Giraudoux’s apocalyptic drama Sodom and Gomorrah – unfinished.

== Output and style ==
Hartmann completed a number of works, most notably eight symphonies. The first of these, and perhaps emblematic of the difficult genesis of many of his works, is Symphony No. 1, Essay for a Requiem (Versuch eines Requiems). It began in 1936 as a cantata for alto solo and orchestra loosely based on a few poems by Walt Whitman. It soon became known as Our Life: Symphonic Fragment (Unser Leben: Symphonisches Fragment) and was intended as a comment on the generally miserable conditions for artists and liberal-minded people under the early Nazi regime. After the defeat of the Third Reich in World War II, the regime's real victims had become clear, and the cantata's title was changed to Symphonic Fragment: Attempt at a Requiem to honor the millions killed in the Holocaust. Hartmann revised the work in 1954–55 as his Symphony No. 1, and published it in 1956. As this example indicates, he was a highly self-critical composer and many of his works went through successive stages of revision. He also suppressed most of his substantial orchestral works of the late 1930s and the war years, either allowing them to remain unpublished or, in several cases, reworking them – or portions of them – into the series of numbered symphonies that he produced in the late 1940s and early 1950s. Perhaps the most frequently performed of his symphonies are No. 4, for strings, and No. 6; probably his most widely known work, through performances and recordings, is his Concerto funebre for violin and strings, composed at the beginning of World War II and making use of a Hussite chorale and a Russian revolutionary song of 1905.

Hartmann attempted a synthesis of many different idioms, including musical expressionism and jazz stylization, into organic symphonic forms in the tradition of Bruckner and Mahler. His early works are both satirical and politically engaged. But he admired the polyphonic mastery of J.S. Bach, the profound expressive irony of Mahler, and the neoclassicism of Igor Stravinsky and Paul Hindemith. In the 1930s he developed close ties with Béla Bartók and Zoltán Kodály in Hungary, and this is reflected in his music to some extent. In the 1940s, he began to take an interest in Schoenbergian twelve-tone technique; though he studied with Webern his own idiom was closer to Alban Berg. In the 1950s, Hartmann started to explore the metrical techniques pioneered by Boris Blacher and Elliott Carter. Among his most-used forms are three-part adagio slow movements, fugues, variations and toccatas.

== Reputation and legacy ==
Significantly, no major West German conductor championed his music following his death: Scherchen, his most noted advocate, died in 1966. Some have suggested that this accelerated the disappearance of Hartmann's music from public view in the years following his death. Conductors who regularly performed Hartmann's music include Rafael Kubelik and Ferdinand Leitner, who recorded the third and sixth symphonies. More recent champions of works by Hartmann include Ingo Metzmacher and Mariss Jansons.

Hans Werner Henze said of Hartmann's music:

Symphonic architecture was essential for him... as a suitable medium for reflecting the world as he experienced and understood it – as an agonizingly dramatic battle, as contradiction and conflict – in order to be able to achieve self-realization in its dialectic and to portray himself as a man among men, a man of this world, and not out of this world.

The English composer John McCabe wrote his Variations on a Theme of Karl Amadeus Hartmann (1964) in tribute. It uses the opening of Hartmann's Fourth Symphony as its theme. Henze made a version of Hartmann's Piano Sonata No. 2 for full orchestra.

== List of works ==
=== Operas ===
- Wachsfigurenkabinett, five short operas (1929–30; three not completed), libretti by Erich Bormann
  - Das Leben und Sterben des heiligen Teufels
  - Der Mann, der vom Tode auferstand (unfinished; completed by Günter Bialas and Hans Werner Henze)
  - Chaplin-Ford-Trott, 'scenic jazz cantata' (unfinished; completed by Wilfried Hiller)
  - Fürwahr? (unfinished; completed by Henze)
  - Die Witwe von Ephesus
- Des Simplicius Simplicissimus Jugend (1934–35; revised 1956–57 as Simplicius Simplicissimus), libretto by Hermann Scherchen, Wolfgang Petzer and Hartmann after Jakob von Grimmelhausen

=== Symphonic works ===
(i) Up to 1945 – mostly later suppressed

- Miserae, Symphonic Poem (1933–34)
- Symphony L'Oeuvre (1937–38; material re-used in Symphony No. 6)
- Symphonic Concerto for string orchestra and soprano (1938; later partly used in Symphony No. 4)
- Sinfonia Tragica (1940, rev. 1943; first movement re-used in Symphony No. 3)
- Sinfoniae Dramaticae (1941–43), consisting of:
  - Overture China kampft (1942, rev. 1962 as Symphonische Ouvertüre)
  - Symphonische Hymnen (1941–43)
  - Symphonic Suite Vita Nova for reciter and orchestra (1941–42, unfinished)
- Adagio for large orchestra (1940–44, revised as Symphony No. 2)
- Symphony Klagegesang (1944; portions re-used in Symphony No. 3)

(ii) After 1945

- Symphony No. 1, Versuch eines Requiems for alto and orchestra (1955) – revised version of Symphonisches Fragment (on texts by Walt Whitman)
- Symphony No. 2 (1946) – revised version of Adagio
- Symphony No. 3 (1948–49) – adapted from portions of Symphony Klagegesang and Sinfonia Tragica
- Symphony No. 4 for string orchestra (1947–48) – adapted from Symphonic Concerto for strings
- Symphony No. 5, Symphonie concertante (1950) – adapted from Concerto for wind and double basses
- Symphony No. 6 (1951–53) – adapted from Symphony L'Oeuvre
- Symphony No. 7 (1957–58)
- Symphony No. 8 (1960–62)

=== Concertos ===
- Lied for trumpet and wind instruments (1932)
- Concerto for wind instruments and solo trumpet (1933); recomposed as Concerto for wind instruments and double basses (1948–49), whence Symphony No.5
- Cello Concerto (1933, lost, probably unfinished)
- Symphonie-Divertissement for bassoon, tenor trombone, double bass and chamber orchestra (c. 1934, unfinished)
- Kammerkonzert for clarinet, string quartet and string orchestra (1930–35)
- Concerto funebre for violin and string orchestra (1939, rev. 1959) (originally entitled Musik der Trauer)
- Concerto for piano, wind instruments and percussion (1953)
- Concerto for viola, piano, wind instruments and percussion (1954–56)

=== Vocal works ===
- Cantata (1929) for 6-part a cappella choir on texts by Johannes R. Becher and Karl Marx
- Profane Messe (1929) for a cappella chorus on a text by Max See
- Kantate for soprano and orchestra on texts by Walt Whitman (1936); later retitled Lamento and in 1938 revised as Symphonisches Fragment, whence Symphony No.1
- Friede Anno '48 (1936–37) for soprano solo, mixed chorus and piano; revised 1955 as Lamento for soprano and piano
- Gesangsszene (1962–63) for baritone and orchestra on a text from Sodom and Gomorrah by Jean Giraudoux

=== Chamber and instrumental ===
- 2 Kleine Suiten for piano (c. 1924–6)
- 2 Sonatas for unaccompanied violin (1927)
- 2 Suites for Unaccompanied violin (1927)
- Jazz Toccata and Fugue for piano (1927–28)
- Tanzsuite for clarinet, bassoon, horn, trumpet and trombone (1931)
- Kleines Konzert for string quartet and percussion (1932)
- Burleske Musik for wind instruments, percussion and piano (1931)
- Sonatina for piano (1931)
- Toccata variata for wind instruments, piano and percussion (1931–32)
- Piano Sonata No.1 (1932)
- String Quartet No.1, Carillon (1933)
- Piano Sonata No.2, 27.IV.45 (1945)
- String Quartet No.2 (1945–46)

== Sources ==
- The Lebrecht Weekly
